= List of highest mountains of the Czech Republic =

This is a list of the highest mountains of the Czech Republic.

Most of them are located in the Giant Mountains, Hrubý Jeseník and Bohemian Forest mountain ranges. Other mountain ranges with mountains over 1000m that are not included in this general list are shown in additional tables. All Czech mountain ranges are located along the borders to neighbouring Austria, Slovakia, Poland and Germany.

The information was obtained from "Mountains in Czech Republic over one thousand meters above sea" and "Peakclimber".

== Location of mountain ranges with summits above 1000 m ==
Giant Mountains	Hrubý Jeseník	Bohemian Forest	Králický Sněžník Mountains	Orlické Mountains

Bohemian Forest Foothills	Ore Mountains	Gratzen Mountains	Hanušovice Highlands	Hostýn-Vsetín Mountains

Jizera Mountains	Ještěd–Kozákov Ridge	Moravian-Silesian Beskids	Upper Palatine Forest	Golden Mountains

== Highest mountains of the Czech Republic ==
Name	Height in m	Mountain Range	Picture
Sněžka	1603 m	Giant Mountains	
Luční hora	1555 m	Giant Mountains	
Studniční hora	1555 m	Giant Mountains	
Vysoké kolo	1509 m	Giant Mountains	
Praděd	1491 m	Hrubý Jeseník	
Stříbrný hřbet	1490 m	Giant Mountains	
Vysoká pláň	1490 m	Giant Mountains	
Violik	1472 m	Giant Mountains	
Vysoká hole	1465 m	Hrubý Jeseník	
Petrovy kameny	1446 m	Hrubý Jeseník	
Malý Šišák	1440 m	Giant Mountains	
Kotel	1435 m	Giant Mountains	
Stříbrné návrší	1433 m	Giant Mountains	
Keprník	1423 m	Hrubý Jeseník	
Králický Sněžník	1423 m	Králický Sněžník Mountains	
Zadní Planina	1423 m	Giant Mountains	
Harrachovy kameny	1421 m	Giant Mountains	
Mužské kameny	1417 m	Giant Mountains	
Vrbatovo návrší	1416 m	Giant Mountains	
Dívčí kameny	1413 m	Giant Mountains	
Svorová hora	1411 m	Giant Mountains	
Zlaté návrší	1411 m	Giant Mountains	
Růžová hora	1396 m	Giant Mountains	
Kozí hřbety	1387 m	Giant Mountains	
Velký Máj	1386 m	Hrubý Jeseník	
Plechý	1378 m	Bohemian Forest	
Vozka	1377 m	Hrubý Jeseník	
Blatný vrch	1376 m	Bohemian Forest	
Nad Rakouskou loukou	1373 m	Bohemian Forest	
Velká Mokrůvka	1376 m	Bohemian Forest	
Malý Děd	1368 m	Hrubý Jeseník	
Jelení hřbet	1367 m	Hrubý Jeseník	
Liščí hora	1363 m	Giant Mountains	
Boubín	1362 m	Bohemian Forest	
Trojmezná	1362 m	Bohemian Forest	
Břidličná hora	1358 m	Hrubý Jeseník	
Dlouhé stráně	1353 m	Hrubý Jeseník	
Žalostná	1352 m	Hrubý Jeseník	
Šerák	1351 m	Hrubý Jeseník	
Špičník	1351 m	Bohemian Forest	
Lysá hora	1344 m	Giant Mountains	
Mravenečník	1343 m	Hrubý Jeseník	
Jezerní hora	1343 m	Bohemian Forest	
Vřesník	1342 m	Hrubý Jeseník	
Vysoký hřeben	1341 m	Bohemian Forest	
Plesná	1337 m	Bohemian Forest	
Červená hora	1337 m	Hrubý Jeseník	
Svaroh	1333 m	Bohemian Forest	

== Further mountain ranges with mountains above 1000 m ==
=== Orlické Mountains ===
Name	Height in m	Mountain range	Picture
Velká Deštná	1116 m	Orlické Mountains	
Koruna	1101 m	Orlické Mountains	

=== Bohemian Forest Foothills ===
Name	Height in m	Mountain range	Picture
Libín	1093 m	Bohemian Forest Foothills	
Kleť	1084 m	Bohemian Forest Foothills	

=== Ore Mountains ===
Name	Height in m	Mountain range	Picture
Klínovec	1244 m	Ore Mountains	
Božídarský Špičák	1115 m	Ore Mountains	

=== Gratzen Mountains ===
Name	Height in m	Mountain range	Picture
Kamenec	1072 m	Gratzen Mountains	
Myslivna	1040 m	Gratzen Mountains	

=== Hanušovice Highlands ===
Name	Height in m	Mountain range	Picture
Jeřáb	1003 m	Hanušovice Highlands	

=== Hostýn-Vsetín Mountains ===
Name	Height in m	Mountain range	Picture
Vysoká	1024 m	Hostýn-Vsetín Mountains	

=== Jizera Mountains ===
Name	Height in m	Mountain range	Picture
Smrk	1124 m	Jizera Mountains	
Jizera	1122 m	Jizera Mountains	

=== Ještěd–Kozákov Ridge ===
Name	Height in m	Mountain range	Picture
Ještěd	1012 m	Ještěd–Kozákov Ridge	

=== Moravian-Silesian Beskids ===
Name	Height in m	Mountain range	Picture
Lysá hora	1323 m	Moravian-Silesian Beskids	
Smrk	1276 m	Moravian-Silesian Beskids	
Radhošť	1129 m	Moravian-Silesian Beskids	

=== Upper Palatine Forest ===
Name	Height in m	Mountain range	Picture
Čerchov	1042 m	Upper Palatine Forest	
Skalka	1005 m	Upper Palatine Forest	

=== Golden Mountains ===
Name	Height in m	Mountain range	Picture
Smrk	1126 m	Golden Mountains	
Travná hora	1125 m	Golden Mountains	
