= Mały Staw =

Lake in Karkonosze National Park, Poland

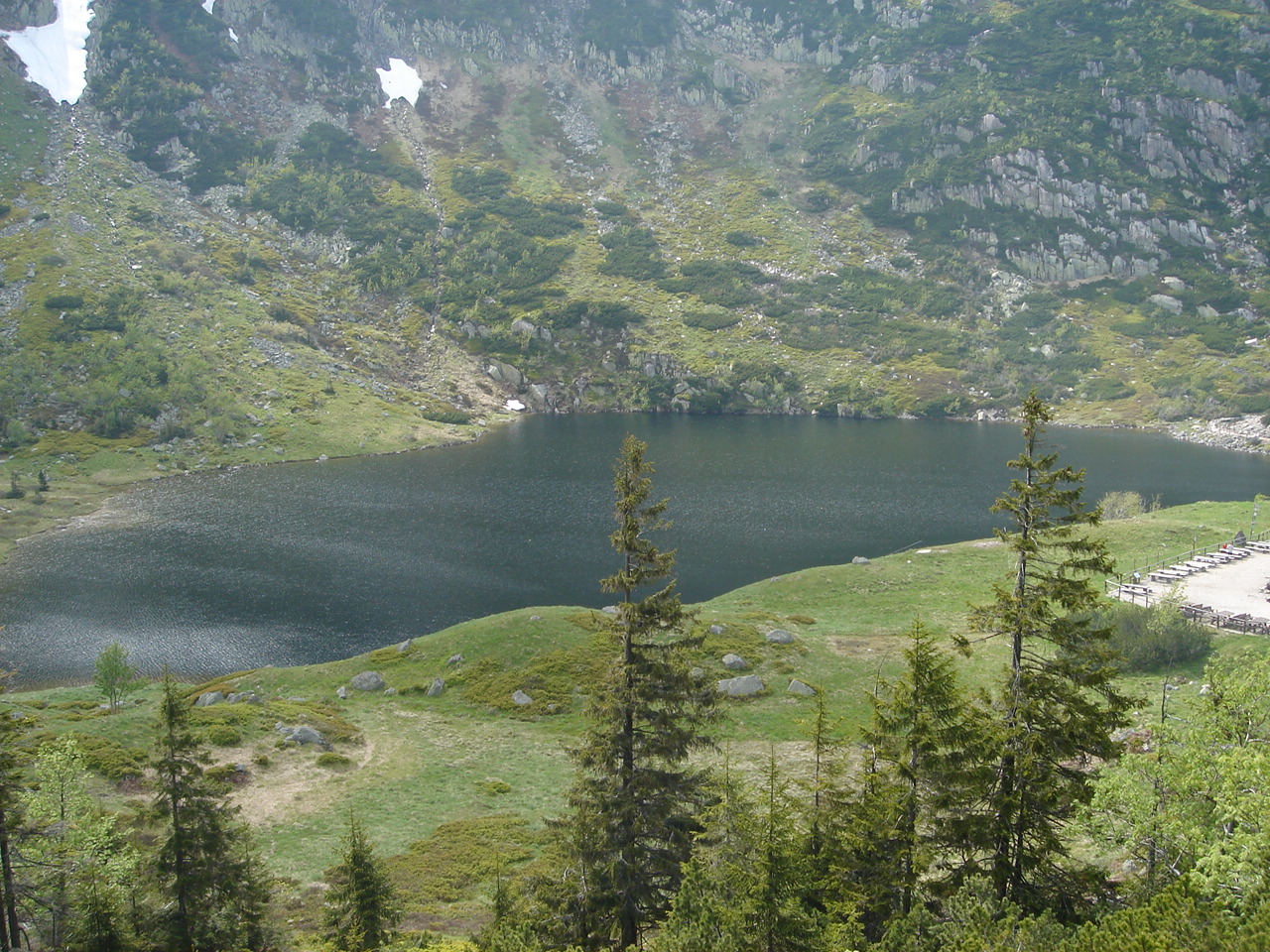

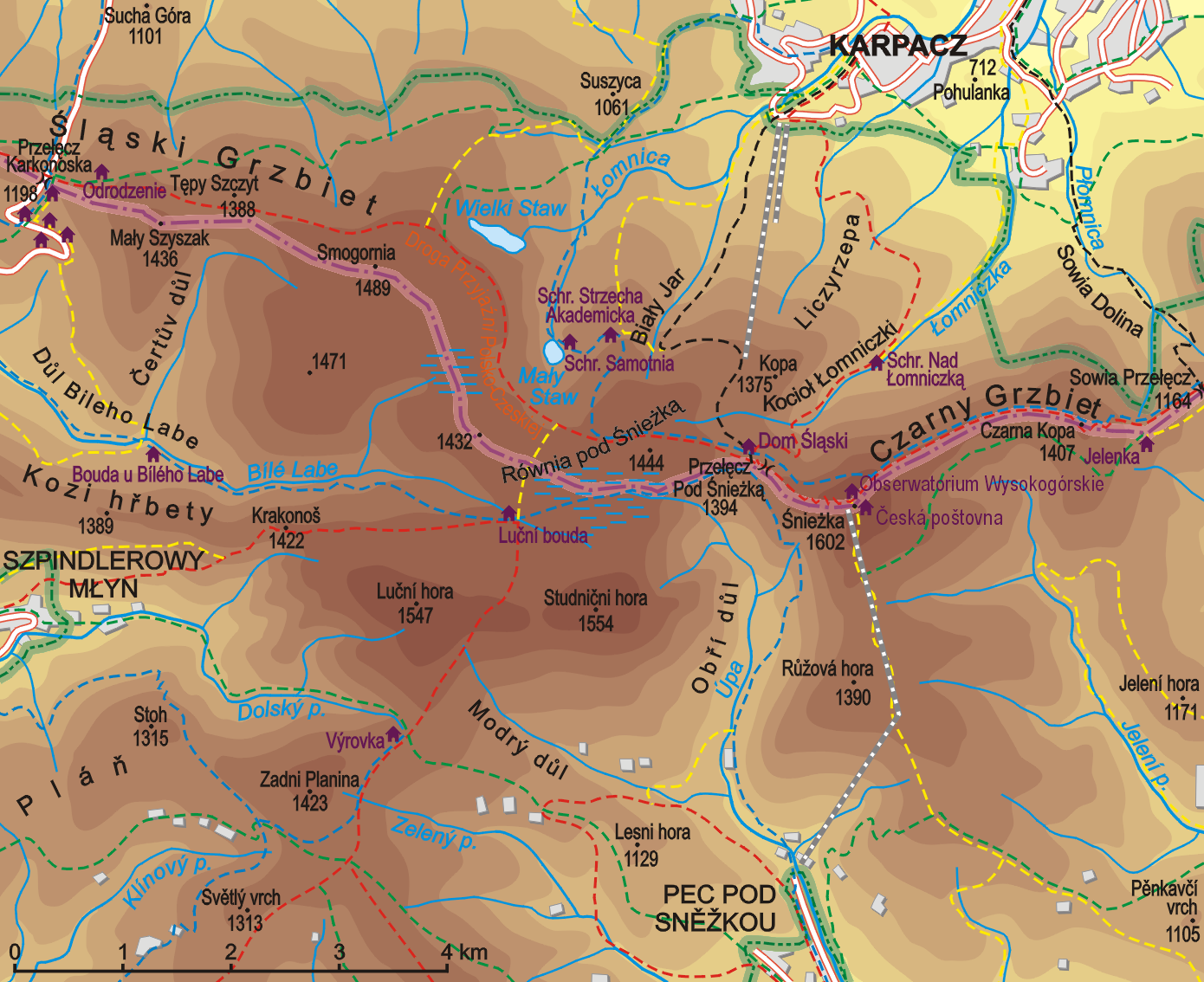
- Location of Mały Staw within the Central Krkonoše
- Location: Lower Silesian Voivodeship, Poland
- Coordinates: 50°44′54.22″N 15°42′3.72″E
- Type: Lake
- Surface area: 2.8 ha (6.9 acres)
- Average depth: 7 m (23 ft)
- Surface elevation: 1,183 m (3,881 ft)

Mały Staw (1,183 m (3,881 ft), Polish for The Small Pond, Kleiner Teich in german) is a natural lake of glacial origin in the Krkonoše mountains in western Poland. It is situated in the Polish Karkonosze National Park at the bottom of the cirque, on the southern slope of the Smogornia mountain, 1 km south of Wielki Staw.

With its area of 2.8 hectares, it is the second biggest glacial lake in the whole range. Its depth reaches 7 m. The place is accessible from the Polish-Czech Friendship Trail (red marks) and a blue marked short distance trail from Równia pod Śnieżką. A mountain hut Samotnia is situated on the north shore.
