= Polish–Czech Friendship Trail =

Public walking path in the Giant Mountains

Coordinates: 50.7372°N 15.7319°E

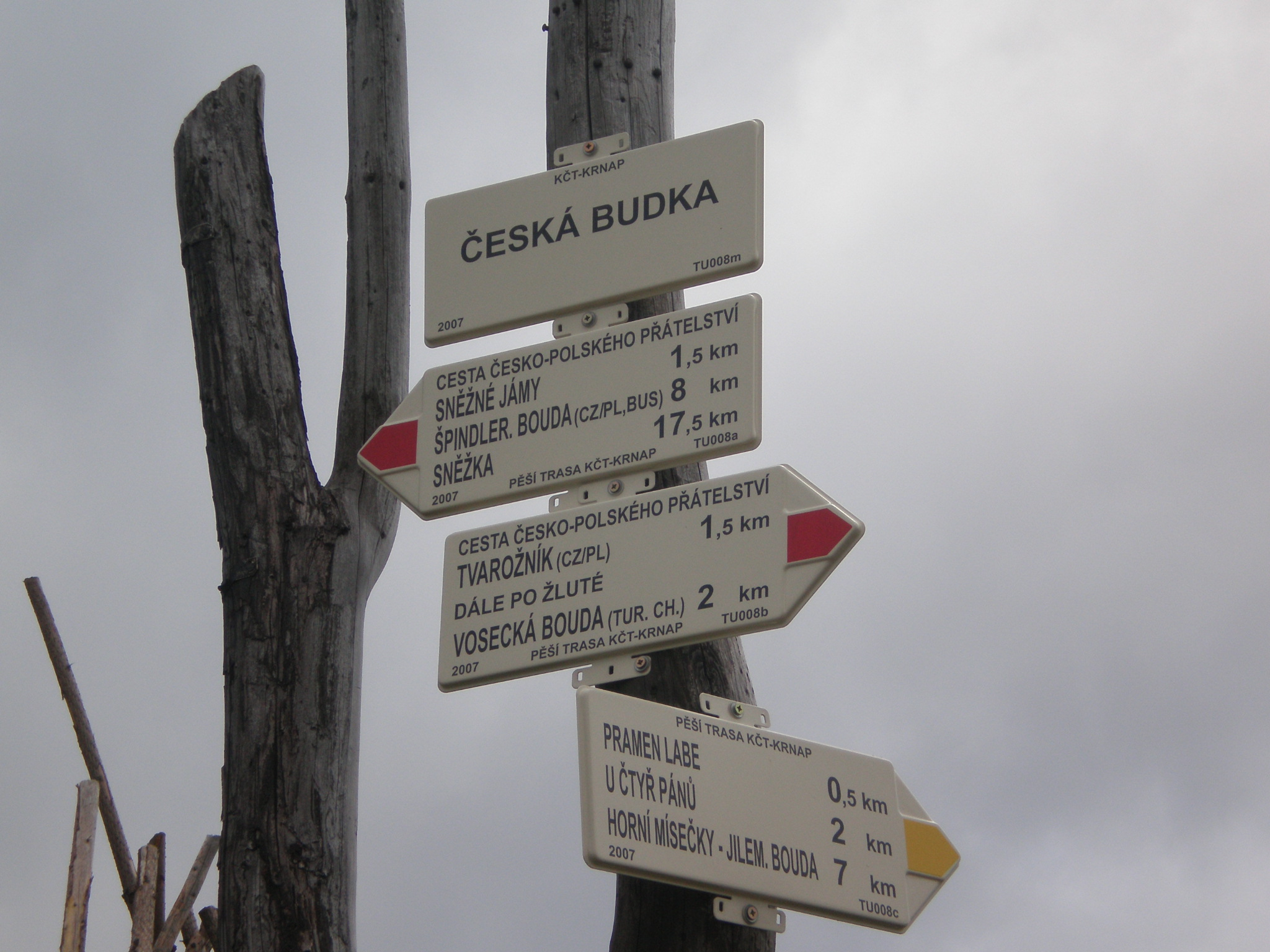
Typical Czech labels on the route

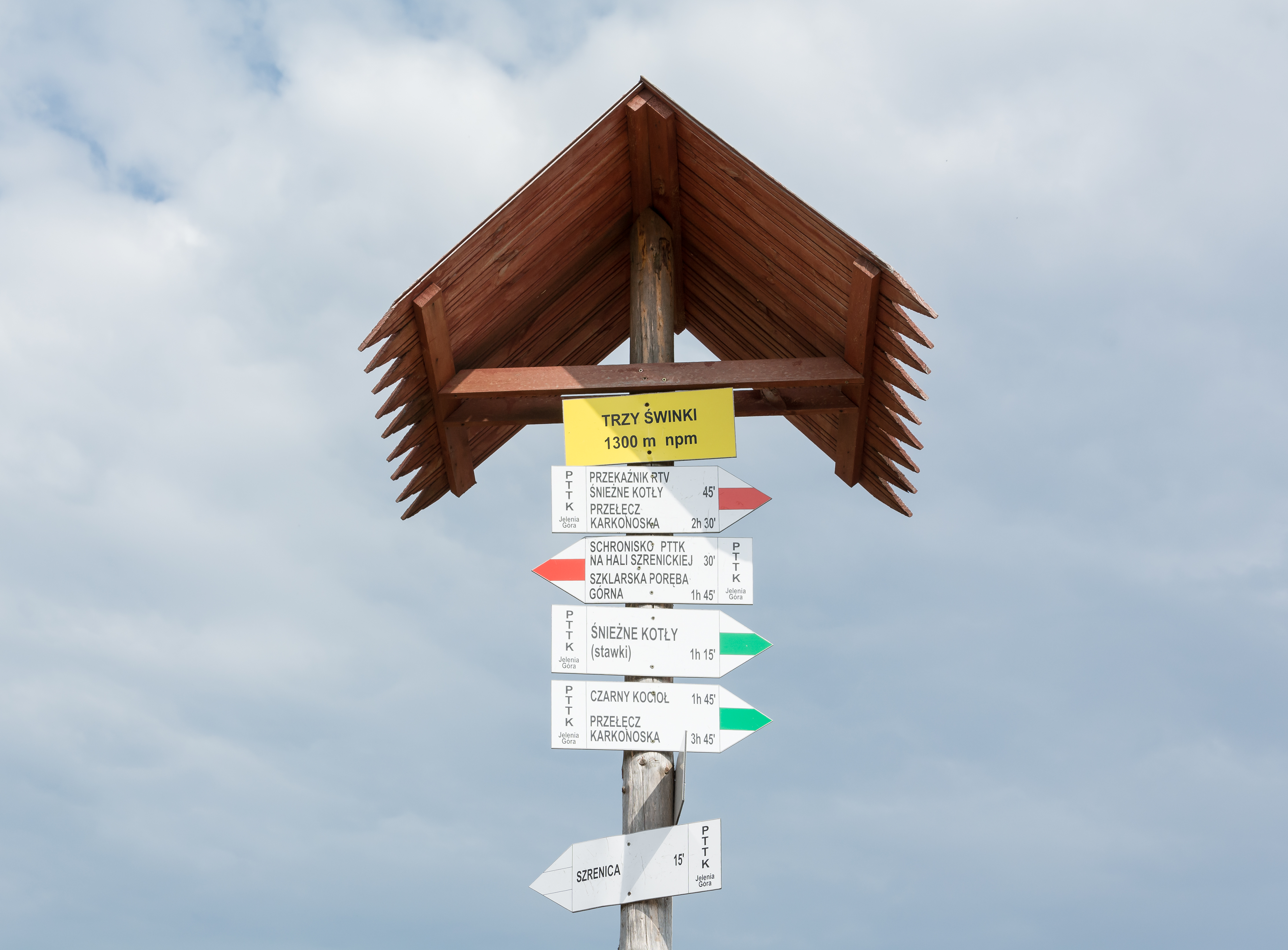
Typical Polish fingerpost

The Polish–Czech Friendship Trail (Czech: Cesta česko-polského přátelství, Polish: Droga Przyjaźni Polsko-Czeskiej) is a public walking path in the Giant Mountains. The path runs on both sides of the Czech–Polish border, along the main ridge and crosses or traverses all its summits. The maintenance of the trail is performed by the staff of both adjacent national parks: the Polish Karkonosze National Park and the Czech Krkonoše National Park. The start point is located on Szrenica and the end in the Okraj pass / Pomezní boudy; the length of the trail is approx. 30 km; the level of difficulty is moderate. The trail partially overlaps with ski trails. The trail is marked with red stripe signs. Many places at the trail are equipped with two signposts parallelly: with Polish one in Polish language according to Polish standards, with distances in hours, and with Czech one in Czech language according to Czech standards, with distances in kilometers.

== History ==
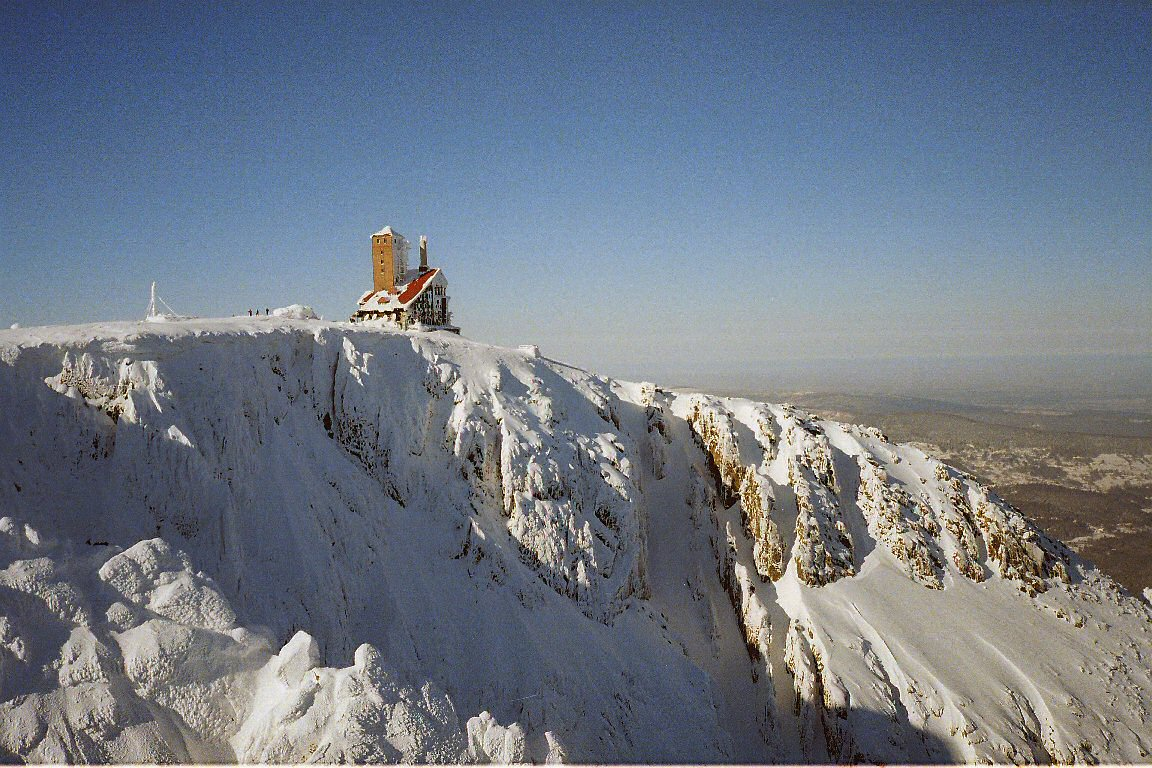
The broadcast mast on the top of the Śnieżne Kotły cirque

=== Background ===
Until the Middle Ages, the peak area of Karkonosze remained untouched; the first people to explore it were treasure hunters looking for gold, and shepherds. Already in the 18th century ascents to the Sněžka/Śnieżka were fairly common, albeit the forms of organised tourism appeared in the second half of 19th century, along with railway access to Jelenia Góra, Szklarska Poręba and Karpacz. Before the rush time for Karkonosze, Śnieżka/Schneekoppe was climbed amongst others by Johann Wolfgang von Goethe. In that period many shepherd's huts were built, called in German Baude and bouda in Czech. Some of them were developed later in mountain huts, which exist even now, e.g. Lucni Bouda. Due to the industrial revolution and the period of prosperity tourism and hiking became popular. This was about the time, when the whole network of roads and trails, altogether ca 300 km, was constructed in both Silesian and Bohemian parts of the mountains. The whole idea was conceived, implemented and managed by two mountain clubs, Austrian Riesengebirgenverein and German Riesengebirgenverein. All the main paths and trails, including these in the alpine area, had been constructed before World War I. The trail, later dubbed Polish-Czech Friendship Trail, was completed before the end of the 19th century. At the beginning of the 20th century, both the Silesian and now Polish part as well as the Bohemian and now Czech part of the region were inhabited by Germans, and the upper zones of the range were a busy tourist region with numerous huts and other facilities.

=== History of the trail ===
The trail was opened on 16 June 1961, as a result of the Polish–Czechoslovak treaty concerned with tourism and mutual relations. It was made possible to hike along the border, but it still involved some formalities (e.g. identity card and check-in to a hotel) and the trail was not accessible to tourists outside these two countries. In the 1970s and 1980s Polish and Czech dissidents met on the trail, including Jacek Kuroń and Václav Havel. With the implementation of martial law in Poland on 13 December 1981 the trail was closed. It was reinstated in 1984. Paradoxically, despite the declared friendship, the trail route was the subject to some formal issues: Czech authorities claimed that the route infringed the Czech territory by 2 metres. Trips to the peak of Sněžka were possible only if accompanied by a guide approved by local authorities (including the army and militia). After the dissolution of Czechoslovakia in 1993, the name changed to Polish-Czech Friendship Trail and the regulations were reduced considerably: the check-points were often left unstaffed and only random inspections on the border were performed. On the introduction of the Schengen rules in 2007, all border controls were eliminated. Nonetheless, any persons crossing the border must have a valid identity document (ID card, passport) with them.

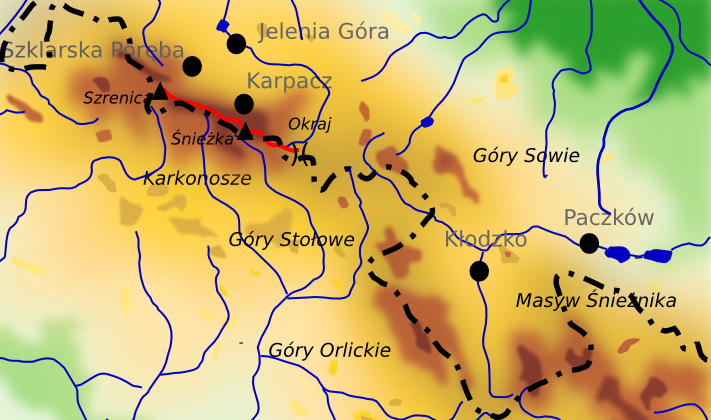
The trail as shown on a map of the Czech-Polish border

== Weather and climate ==
Being situated in the upper part of the Karkonosze range, the trail's climate is generally more varied and less favourable than in the lower levels. Both major peaks on the trail, Sněžka and Szrenica are shrouded in fog or cloud for more than half of the year: for 296 days and 264 days respectively. The annual average temperature on Mount Sniezka reaches approx +0.2 °C, for Szrenica +1.9 °C. Snow covers the ground until at least April; in the snow pits melts even in summer. Also, Śnieżka is one of the windiest place in Poland; only about three days a year are calm.

== Nature ==
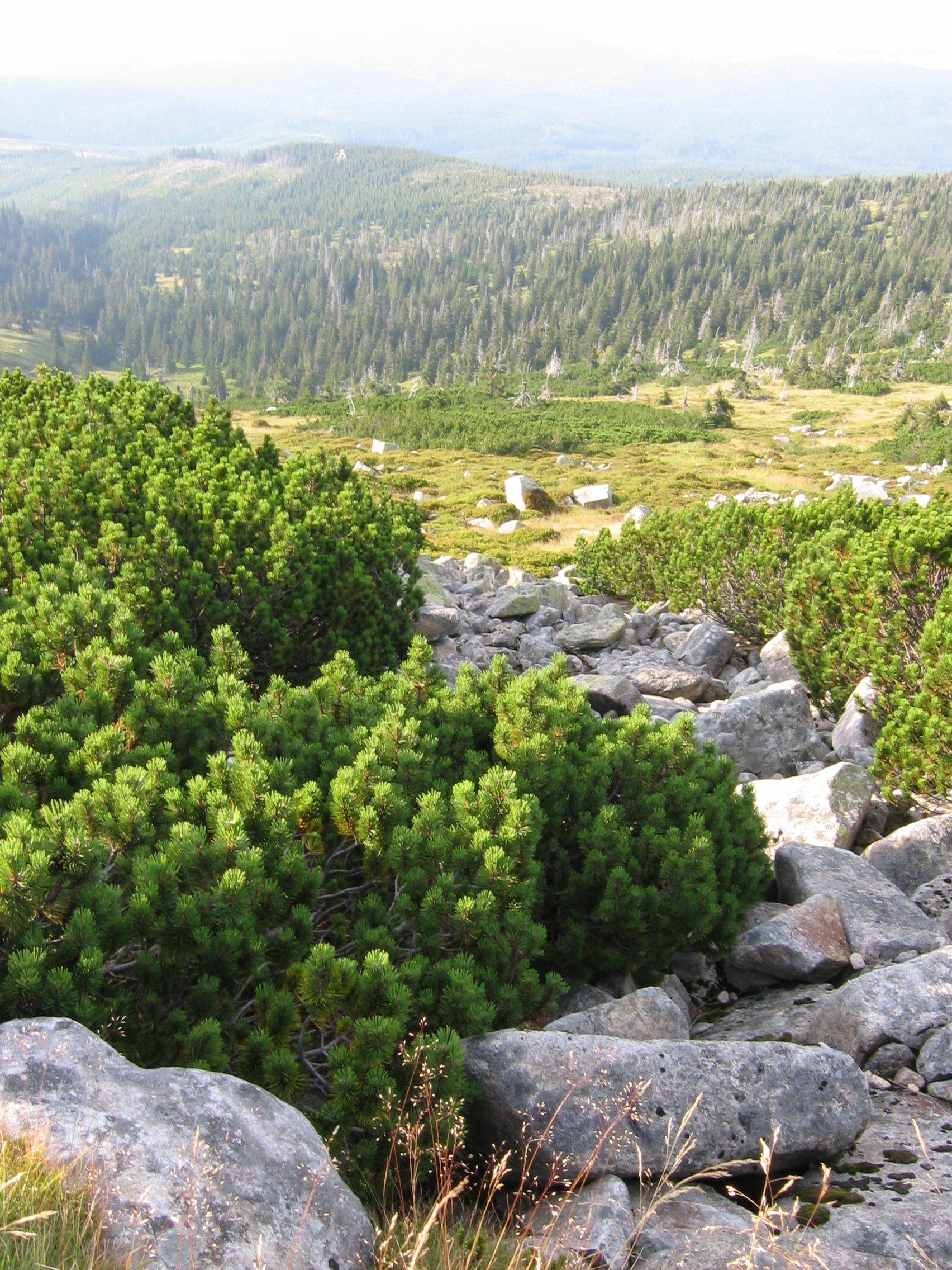
Mountain pine - the most frequent tree on the trail

The path on its whole course stays away from the hardwood forest; with the predominant montane and subalpine vegetation zone; spruce monoculture prevails. Acid rains, frequent in years 1980 and 1990 affected the area, though their destructive effect was not as powerful as in the lower zones. In some parts, especially around Mały Szyszak mountain meadows cover the large areas, used in 19th and in the first half of the 20th centuries as mountain pasture areas. This has come to a standstill, although some traces of those activities, as old shepherd huts, can still be found; some of them have been converted into mountain huts.

The subalpine vegetation zone, prevailing along the track, consists of subarctic highmoors and mountain pine. Many species coexist here, as cloudberry and lichen. The alpine vegetation zone appears only at the slopes of Śnieżka which is a rocky desert covered in granite rubble.

The fauna to be met on the trail is relatively poor due to the fact that the region was long ago penetrated by human beings. Bears, volves, once numerous, especially in the pass areas, are extinct. Badgers, mouflons occur relatively rarely, especially in the topmost regions along the trail. One representative of alpine fauna is the mountain shrew. The world of birds is much richer, comprising among others black grouse, Tengmalm's owl, alpine accentor, water pipit, common redpoll, Western Capercaillie. Numerous nonvertebrates also occur in the alpine zone.

== Route description ==
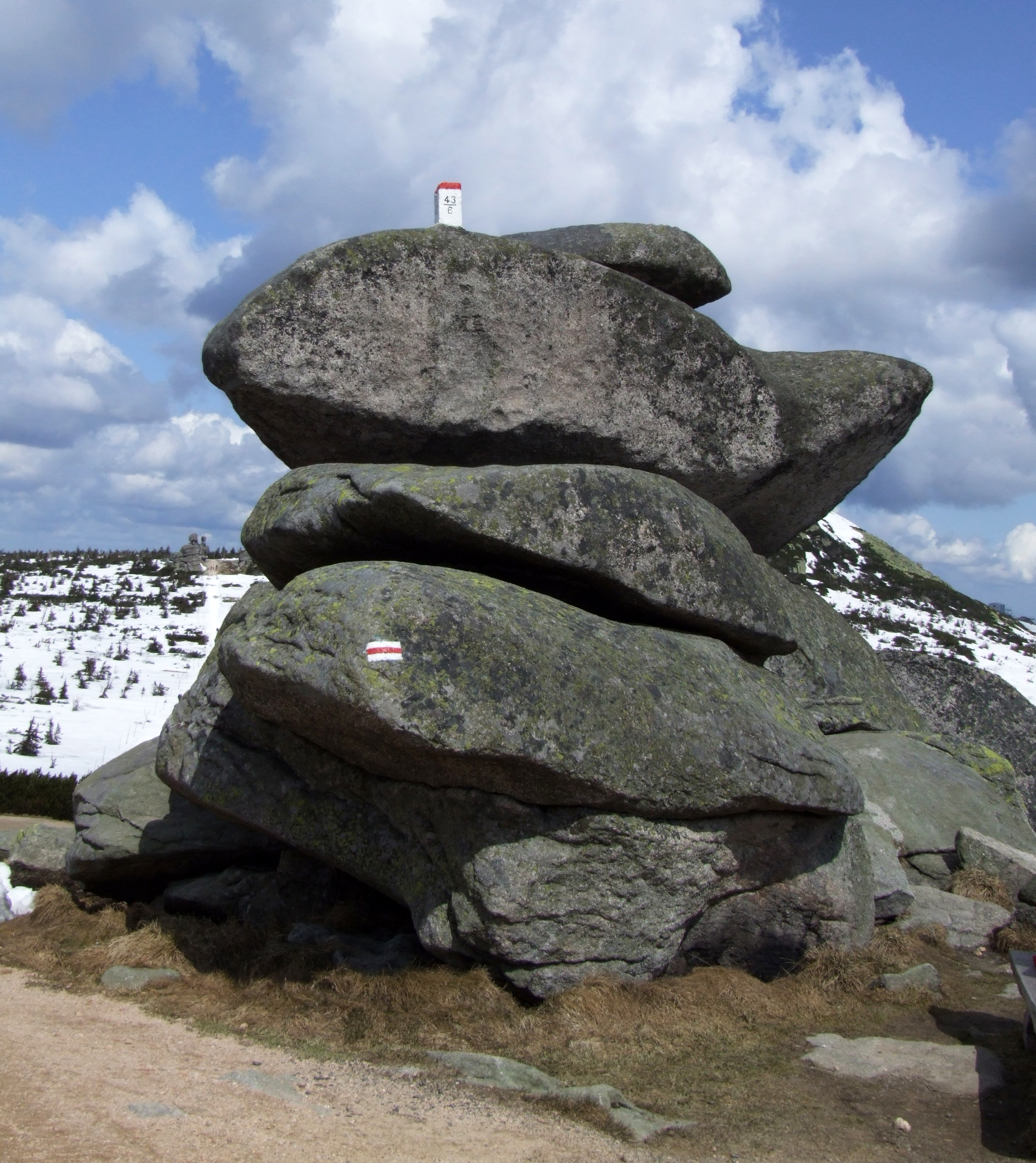
Rock formation Twarożnik. Border post on the top of the rock

=== From Szrenica to Przełęcz Karkonoska ===
The trail starts at Szrenica joining the Main Sudeten Trail, which starts in Świeradów-Zdrój in the Jizera Mountains (ending in Prudnik in the Opawskie Mountains), subsequent mountain range and runs eastwards along the main ridge to Śnieżka, the highest summit of the range.

After a mild descent amongst the vast mountain pine shrub, it traverses the second highest peak of the range, Wielki Szyszak, the helmet shaped peak, which it derives its Polish name from. Covered in granite rocks, it elevates distinctly over other peaks of this part of the range, being the steepest and with the most alpine features. Then the trail touches the upper border of Śnieżne Kotły, two glacial cirques, the nature reserve. The radio tower above has been the distinctive landmark since the moment it was built. Sniezne Kotly offer landscapes over the whole Lower Silesia region. The trail traverses Łabski szczyt hosting the sources of the Elbe River on the Czech side, then runs along the top of another post-glacial cirque, Wielki Kocioł Jagniątkowski, which precedes two mild peaks with the prominent rock formations, Czeskie Kamienie and Śląskie Kamienie (Silesian Rocks and Czech Rocks). These names are entirely Polish, as in Czech and German they are dubbed "Male Rocks" and "Female Rocks". Finally, the trail falls mildly to reach the Przełęcz Karkonoska, dividing Karkonosze into western and eastern part.

=== From Przełęcz Karkonoska to Okraj Pass ===
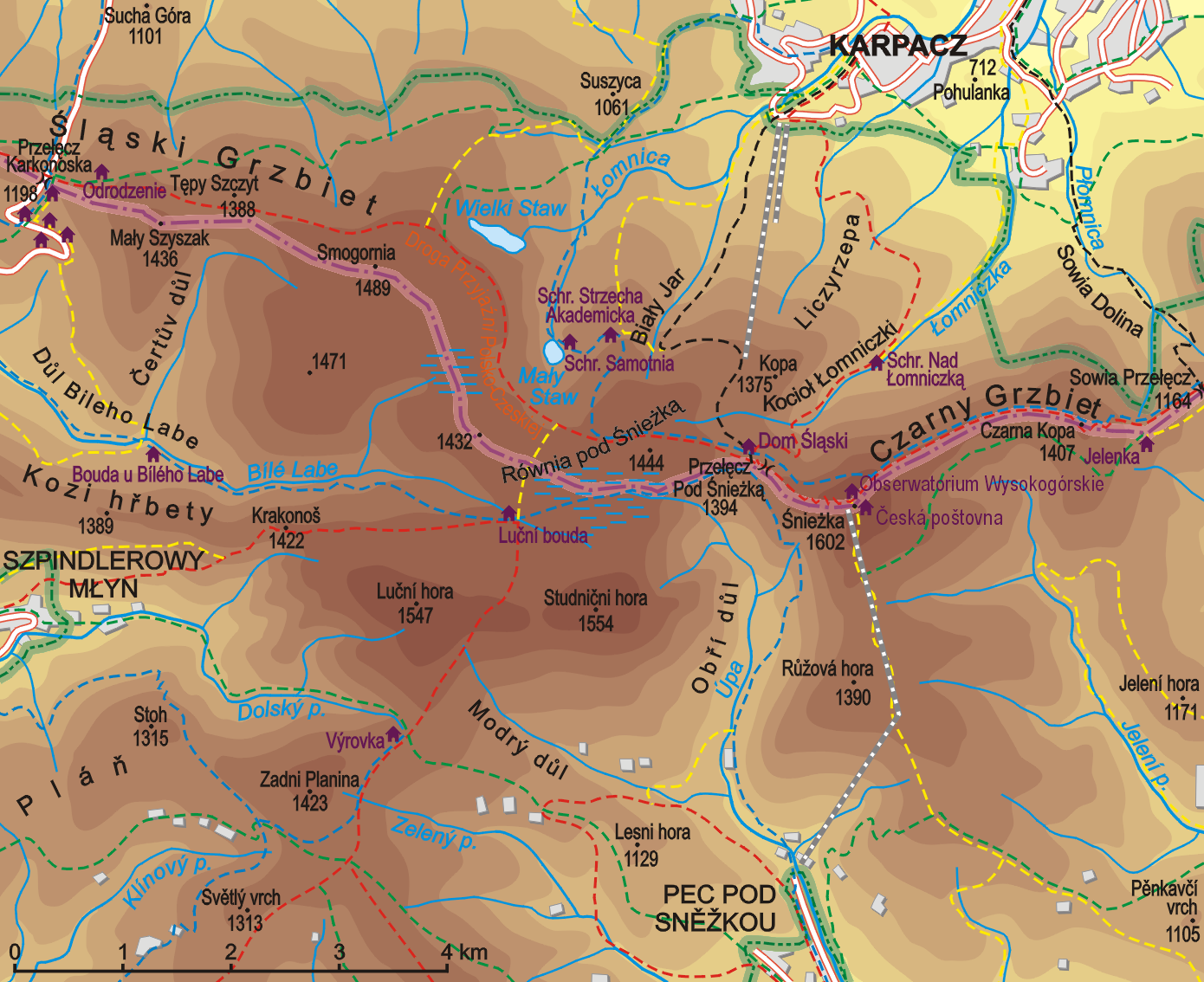
Eastern part of the trail

The pass is a junction of short-distance trails as well as ski trails; the tarmac road, crossing the pass is one of the steepest in Poland. Albeit the quality of tarmac on Polish side is relatively poor, the pass is the goal of mountain bikers. There are two mountain huts on the pass: Czech Spindlerova Bouda and Polish Odrodzenie. In 1936, The latter, as being the property of a Jew, was confiscated by Nazis and converted into a boarding house for members of Hitlerjugend, later changed into a hotel for Nazi officers. The pass is accessible by car and bus from the Czech side.

From there on the way to Śnieżka, the trail traverses the mild peak Smogornia and, leading through the exposed grassy slope with common mountain pine shrubs slowly descends to the standalone rock Słonecznik. On the left, suddenly a deep cirque appears with Wielki Staw and Maly Staw at the bottom, two postglacial lakes, accessible by means of a path downhill, marked blue. Near the lakes, there are two mountain huts: Samotnia and Strzecha Akademicka. Then the trail crosses the plateau Równia pod Śnieżką with cirques on both sides. The Friendship trail intersects here with several important paths to remarkable towns: Špindlerův Mlýn and Karpacz. At the mountain hut Śląski Dom, once the border checkpoint, the trail ascends the peak of Śnieżka; the only fragment which involves climbing up the steep slope. There is a possibility of avoiding this effort, by choosing Droga Jubileuszowa, (Jubilee Road), mild cobblestone road able to carry car and small truck traffic. Although shortcuts are forbidden along the whole trail, this place is extremely dangerous due to marshy ground. Having passed the peak, the pass runs parallel to the border on the Czech side, that is the place when the trail does not stick directly to the borderline.

The trail finishes at the grassy Okraj Pass.

Trail map online: link

== Landmarks on the trail ==
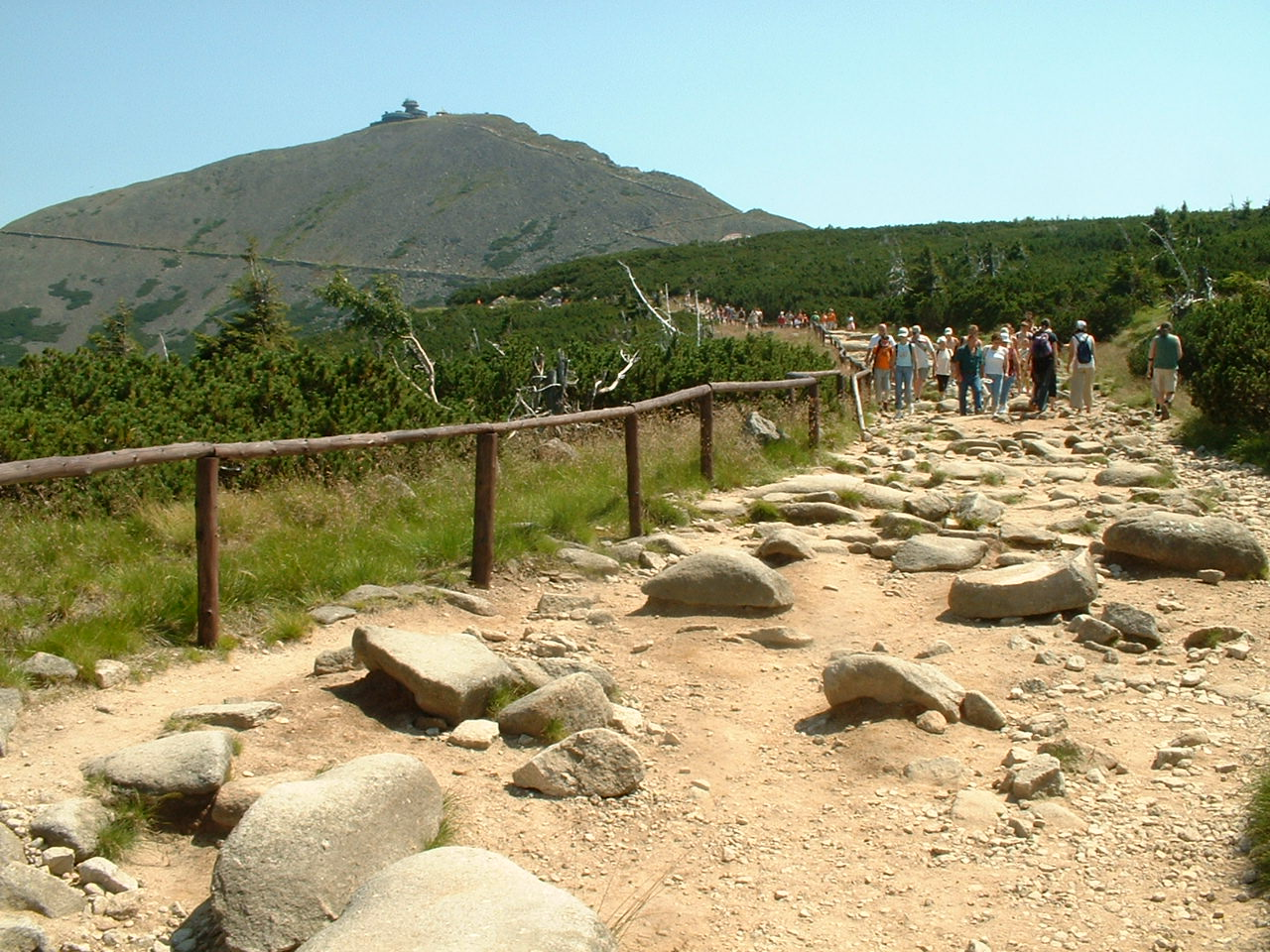
The plateau Równia pod Śnieżką

The trail runs through or traverses the following peaks:

- Szrenica, 1,362 metres (4,469 ft), summit station of chair lift from Szklarska Poręba
- Łabski Szczyt 1,476 metres (4,843 ft) (traverses)
- Wielki Szyszak (Czech: Vysoké kolo),
- Śmielec (Czech: Velký Šišák), 1,424 metres (4,672 ft)
- Czeskie Kamienie (Czech: Mužské kameny), 1,416 metres (4,646 ft)
- Śląskie Kamienie (Czech: Dívčí kameny), 1,414 metres (4,639 ft)
- Przełęcz Karkonoska, 1,198 metres (3,930 ft), separating two parts of the mountain range
- Mały Szyszak (Czech: Malý Šišák),
- Smogornia, 1,489 metres (4,885 ft) (traverses)
- Sněžka (Polish: Śnieżka), 1,603 metres (5,259 ft), highest peak, summit station of chair lift from Pec pod Sněžkou
- Czarna Kopa (Czech: Svorová hora)
- Okraj, 1,046 metres (3,432 ft) – completion

== Access ==
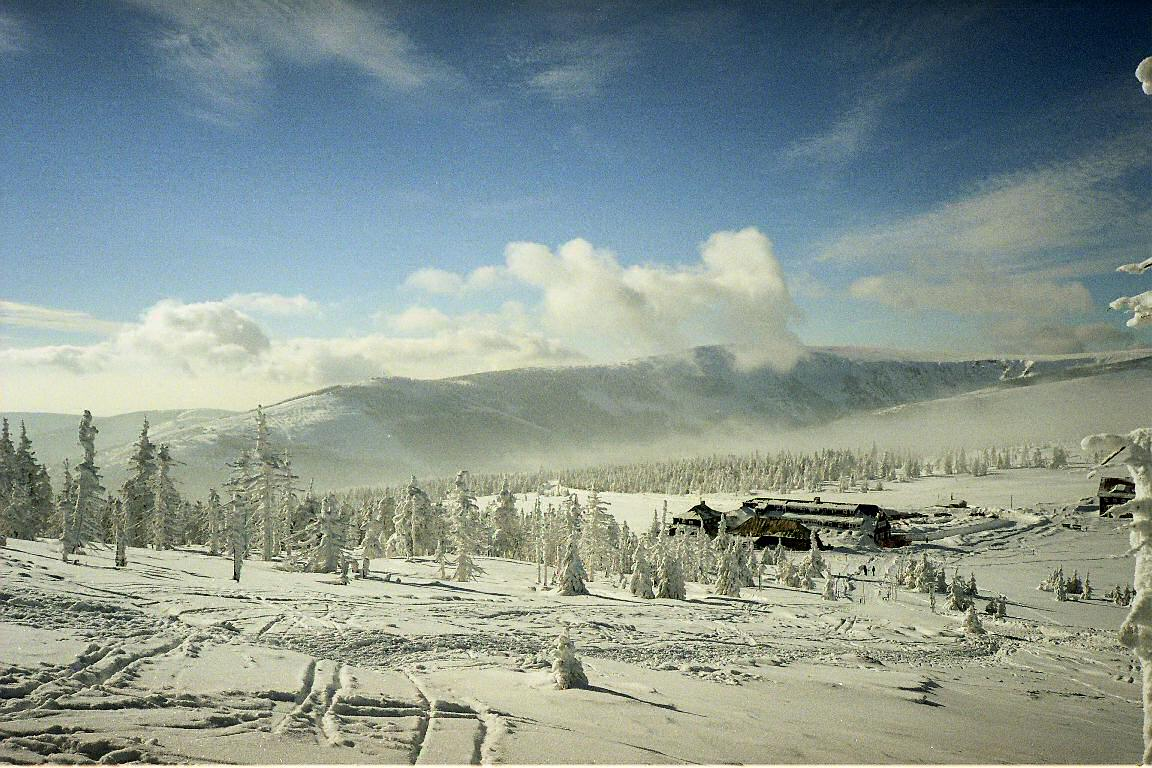
The Špindler's Hut in winter

The path is accessible by chair lifts from Szklarska Poręba, Karpacz and Špindlerův Mlýn. It is open the whole year, although some parts as well as linking routes may be closed in winter due to avalanches. Along the trail there are over 10 junctions with other trails, leading to towns, bus and railway stations in both countries respectively. Mountain huts are available on the trail or in the vicinity, mostly with refreshments and some offering catering for organised groups. The route is secured with fences along abysses (Śnieżne Kotły, Mały Staw and Wielki Staw), other climbing aids, mostly chains, are available in the most difficult parts. The route falls under the Karkonosze National Park ordinance, according to which, among others, hiking out of the marked trails, shortcuts and rough camping are forbidden and are subjects to fines. The path is clearly and visibly marked, although Polish signs show distances in hours, Czech ones - in kilometres.

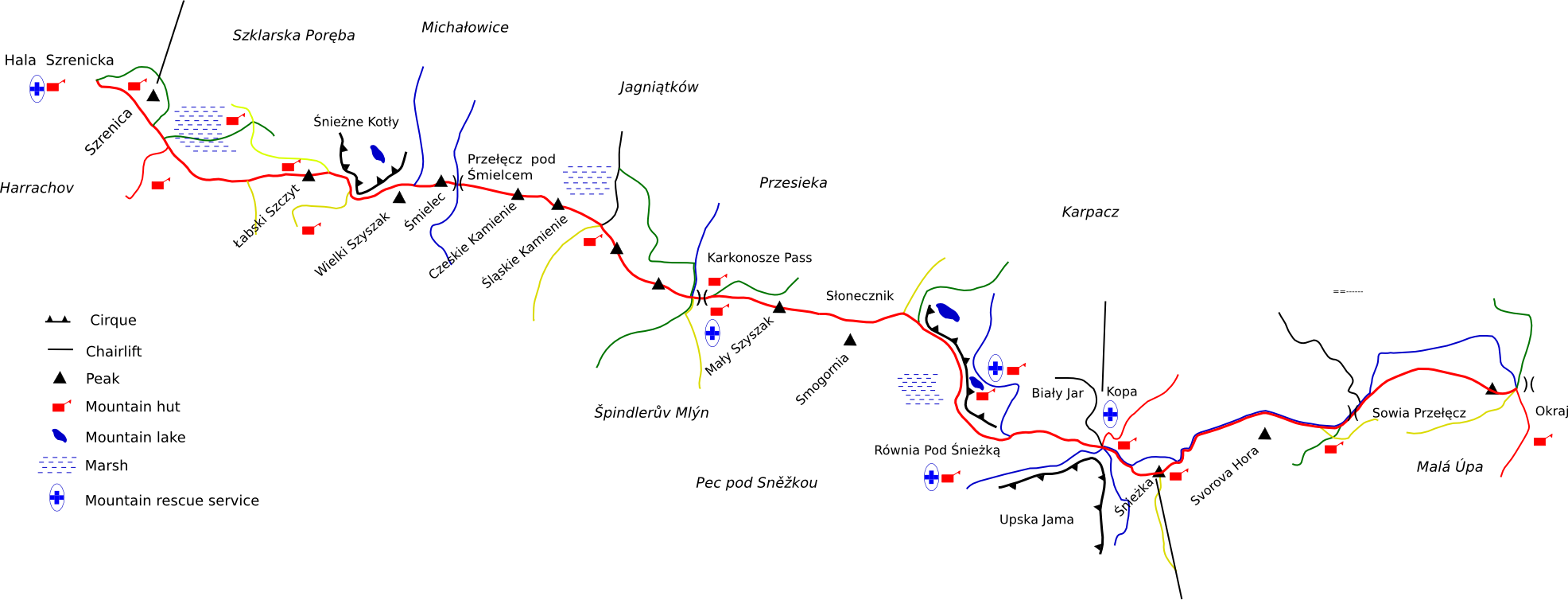
The detailed sketch of the trail, showing junctions, other trails, peaks and other formations

== Maintenance and rescue service ==
The trail is maintained by the staff of the national parks of two countries: Polish Karkonosze National Park and Czech Krkonoše National Park. They are in charge of the current maintenance, road repair and other current and long-term plans, which is regulated by an act issued by the parliaments of both countries and there are government financed and supported institutions. In all emergencies and accidents, the operations are conducted by the mountain rescue services of two countries: Górskie Ochotnicze Pogotowie Ratunkowe (Polish Mountain Voluntary Emergency Corps) – Karkonosze Group, which operates 3 permanent and 6 winter stations in the vicinity of the trail and the Czech corpse Mountain Rescue Service – respectively 5 permanent and 9 winter stations.
