= Wielki Staw =

Lake in Lower Silesian Voivodeship, Poland

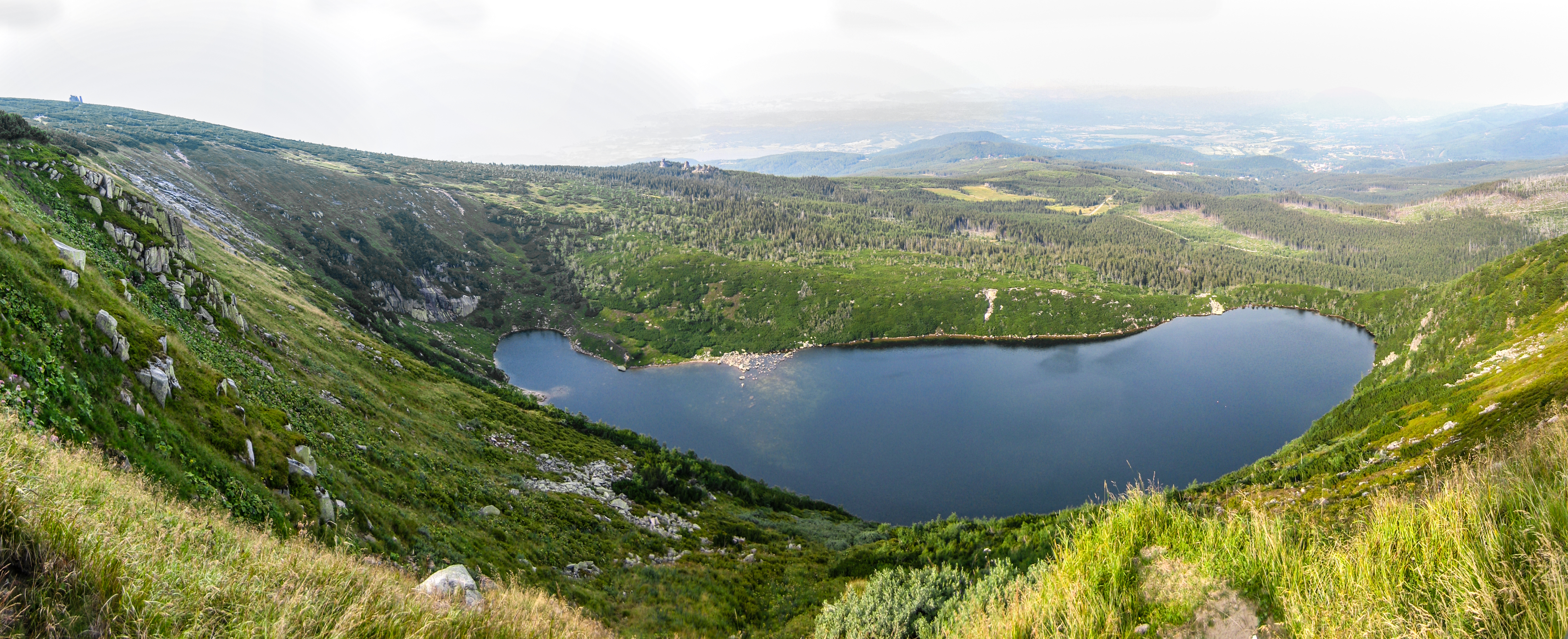

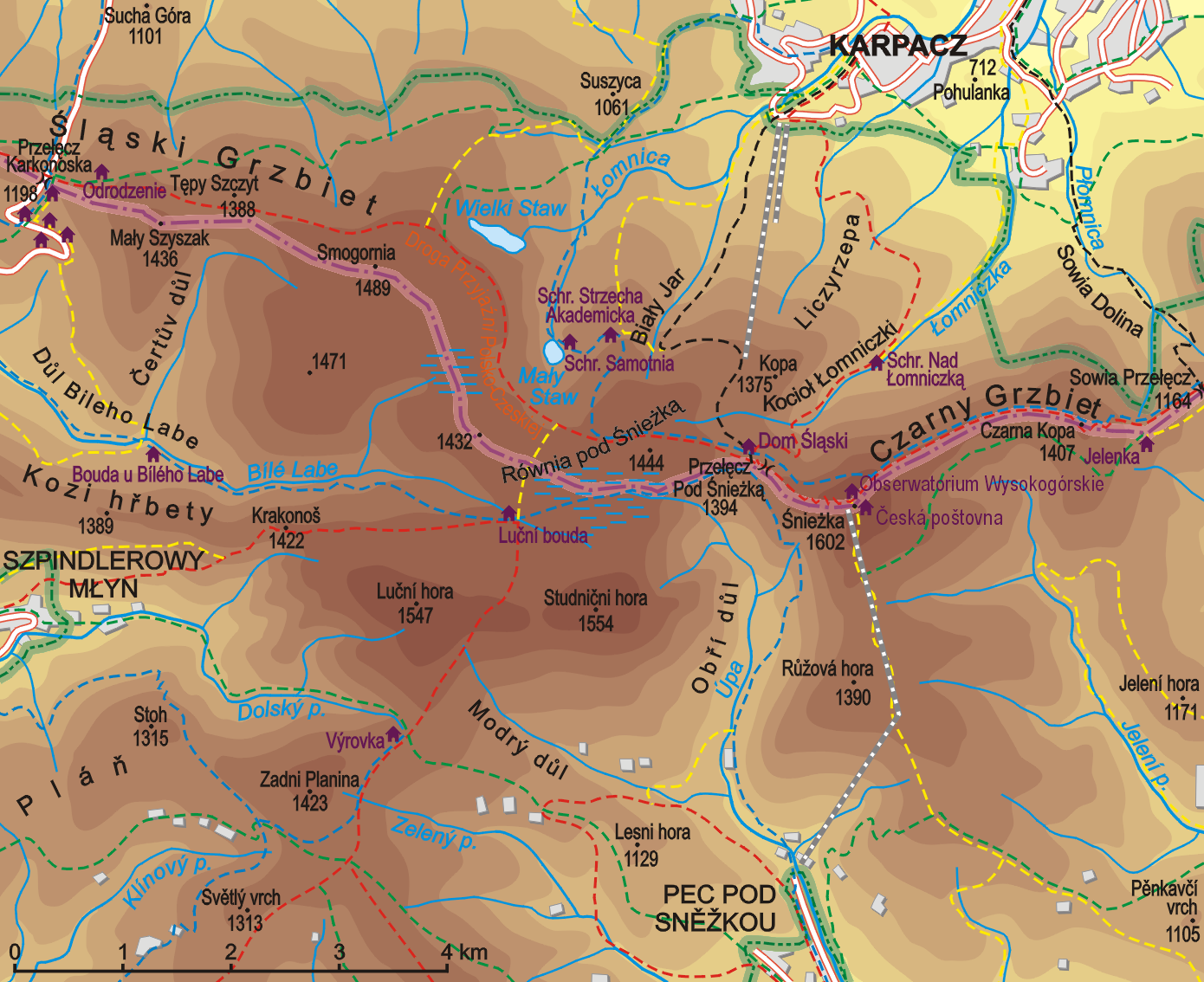
- Location of Wielki Staw within the Central Krkonoše
- Location: Poland
- Coordinates: 50°45′30″N 15°41′37″E
- Surface area: 8.3 ha (21 acres)
- Surface elevation: 1,225 m (4,019 ft)

Wielki Staw (1,225 metres (4,019 ft), Polish for The Big Pond, Grosser Teich in German) - post glacial natural lake in the Krkonoše mountains, in western Poland. It is situated in the Karkonosze National Park at the bottom of the cirque, on the southern slope of the Smogornia mountain.

With its area of 8.3 hectares, it is the biggest glacial lake in the whole range. Its depth reaches 25 m, the shores are covered in subalpine species. Waters of the lake host rare species, some of them even extinct like Isoetes lacustris. Due to the regulations of a nature reserve, the object is closed and can be watched only from the top of the cirque. The place is accessible from the Polish–Czech Friendship Trail (red marks).

== See also ==
- Mały Staw
