= Czeskie Kamienie =

Peak in Giant Mountains, Czech Republic-Poland

Czeskie Kamienie / Mužské kameny Śląskie Kamienie / Dívčí kameny
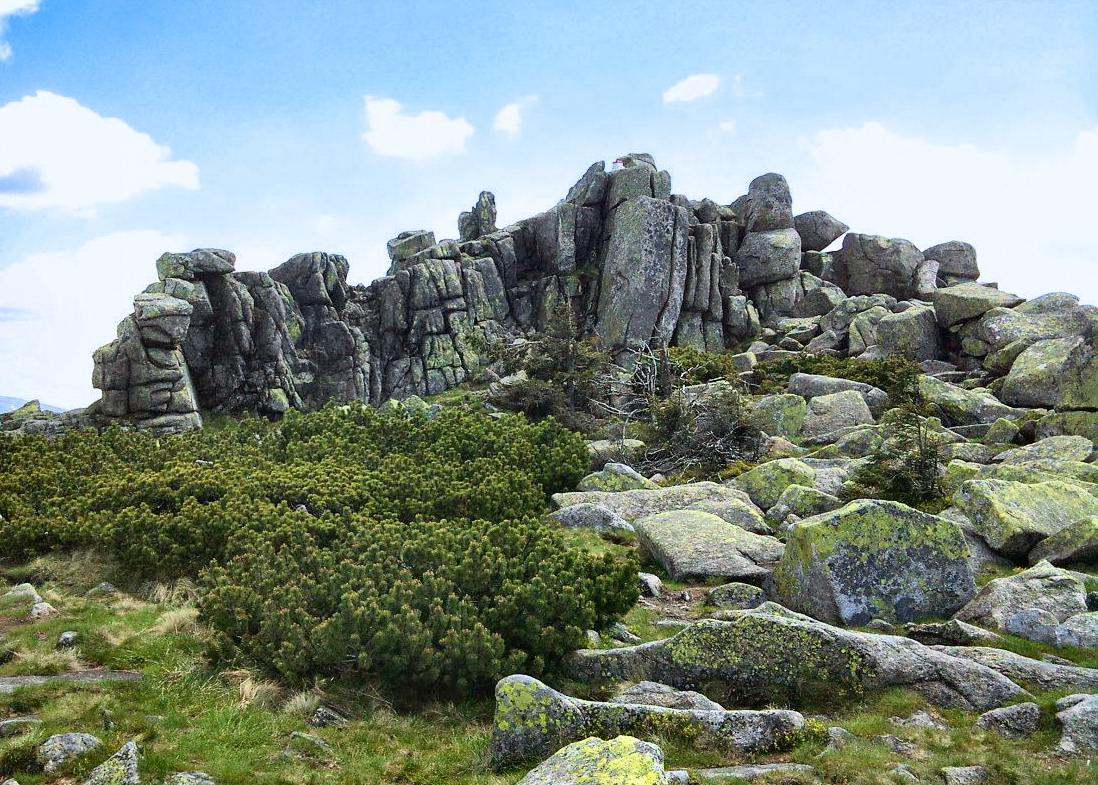
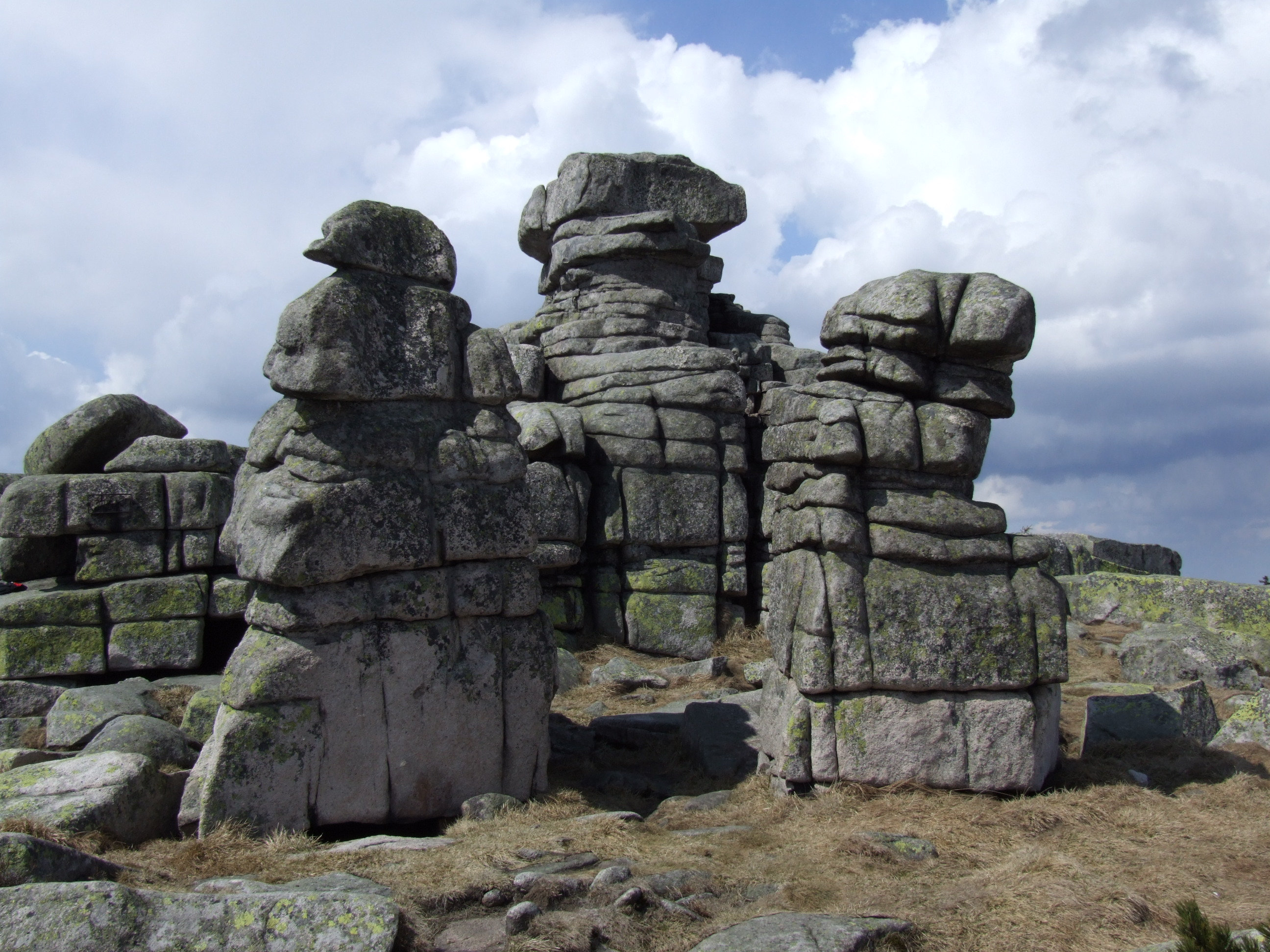
- Czeskie Kamienie Śląskie Kamienie

Highest point
- Elevation: 1,416 m (4,646 ft)
- Coordinates: 50°46′36″N 15°35′30″E

Geography
- Location within Czech Republic Location within Poland
- Location: Czech Republic / Poland
- Parent range: Giant Mountains

Climbing
- Easiest route: public path marked red from Okraj

Czeskie Kamienie or Mužské kameny (lit. 'Bohemian Rocks' or 'Man Rocks' in Polish and Czech respectively), 1,416 metres (4,646 ft) and Śląskie Kamienie or Dívčí kameny (lit. 'Silesian Rocks' or 'Maiden Rocks'), 1,413 metres (4,636 ft) is a twin peak and a rock formation in the Giant Mountains, on the Czech–Polish border.

== Location and description ==
The twin peak is located in the western part of the Giant Mountains, on the Czech–Polish border between Śmielec and the Przełęcz Karkonoska. The twin peak is within the Krkonoše and Karkonosze national parks, on the Polish–Czech Friendship Trail.

Czeskie Kamienie is located west of Śląskie Kamienie. Czeskie Kamienie is up to 11 m (36 ft) high and forms a 50 m-long (160 ft) granite wall. West of it is a small blockfield.

== Monuments ==
A stone monument reminds the tragedy of the Czech journalist Richard Kalman, who died here during a snow storm on 14 January 1929.
