= Czarna Kopa =

Mountain in Poland and the Czech Republic

- Svorová hora
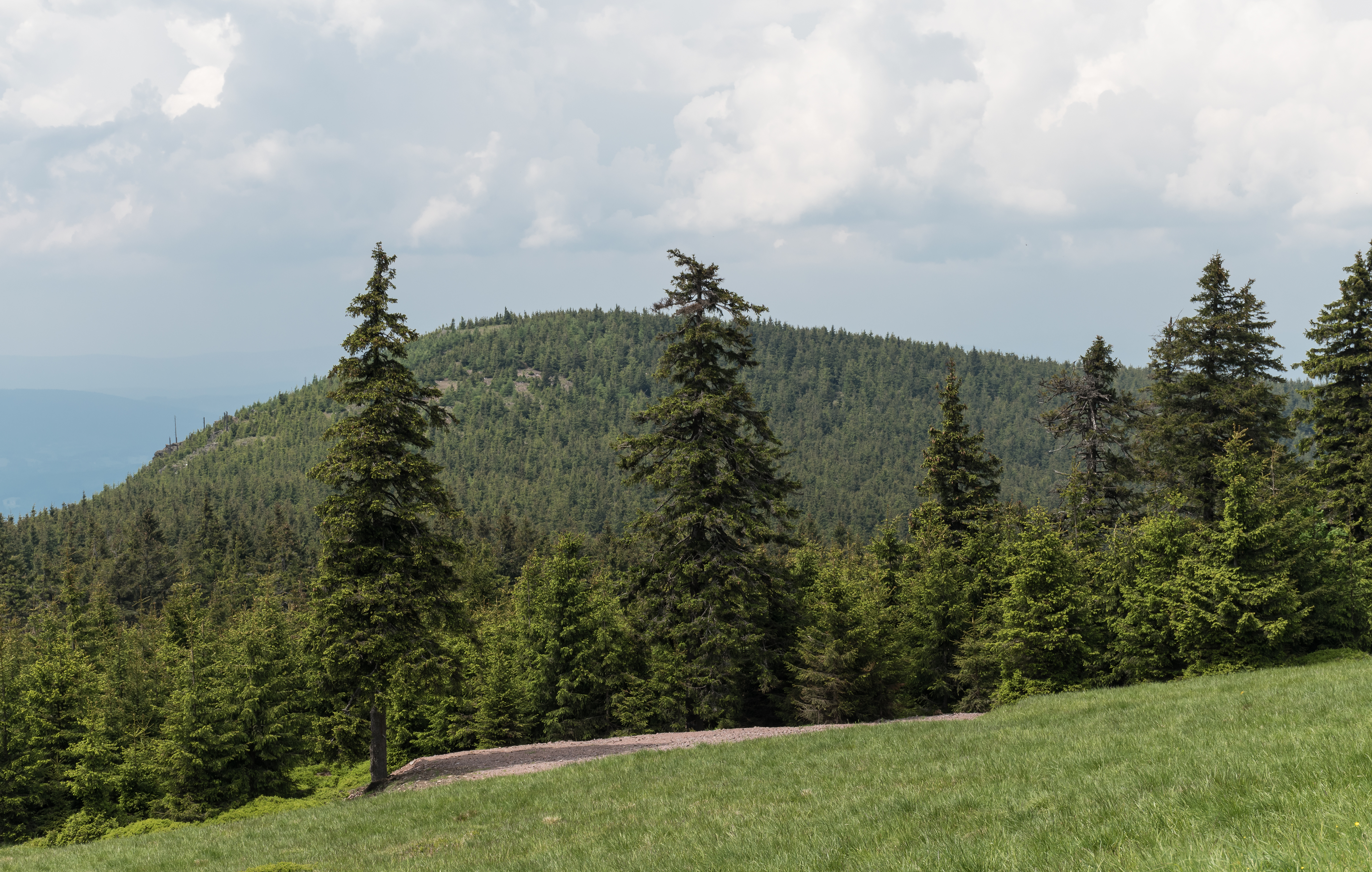

Highest point
- Elevation: 1,407 m (4,616 ft)
- Prominence: 60 m (200 ft)from the range
- Coordinates: 50°44′36″N 15°46′07″E

Geography
- Location within Czech Republic
- Location: Czech Republic / Poland
- Parent range: Giant Mountains

Climbing
- Easiest route: public path marked red from Okraj

Czarna Kopa (Czech Svorová hora, 1,407 m (4,616 ft) a.s.l., German: Schwarze Koppe) is a mountain peak situated in the eastern part of Karkonosze on Polish and Czech border within the Karkonosze National Park on the Polish–Czech Friendship Trail. The peak area is exposed and windy.

== Situation ==
In the main range the very distinct peak is situated between Śnieżka and Okraj. The summit is entirely on the Czech side.
