= Równia pod Śnieżką =

Plateau in Poland and the Czech Republic

- Czech: Rovina pod Sněžkou
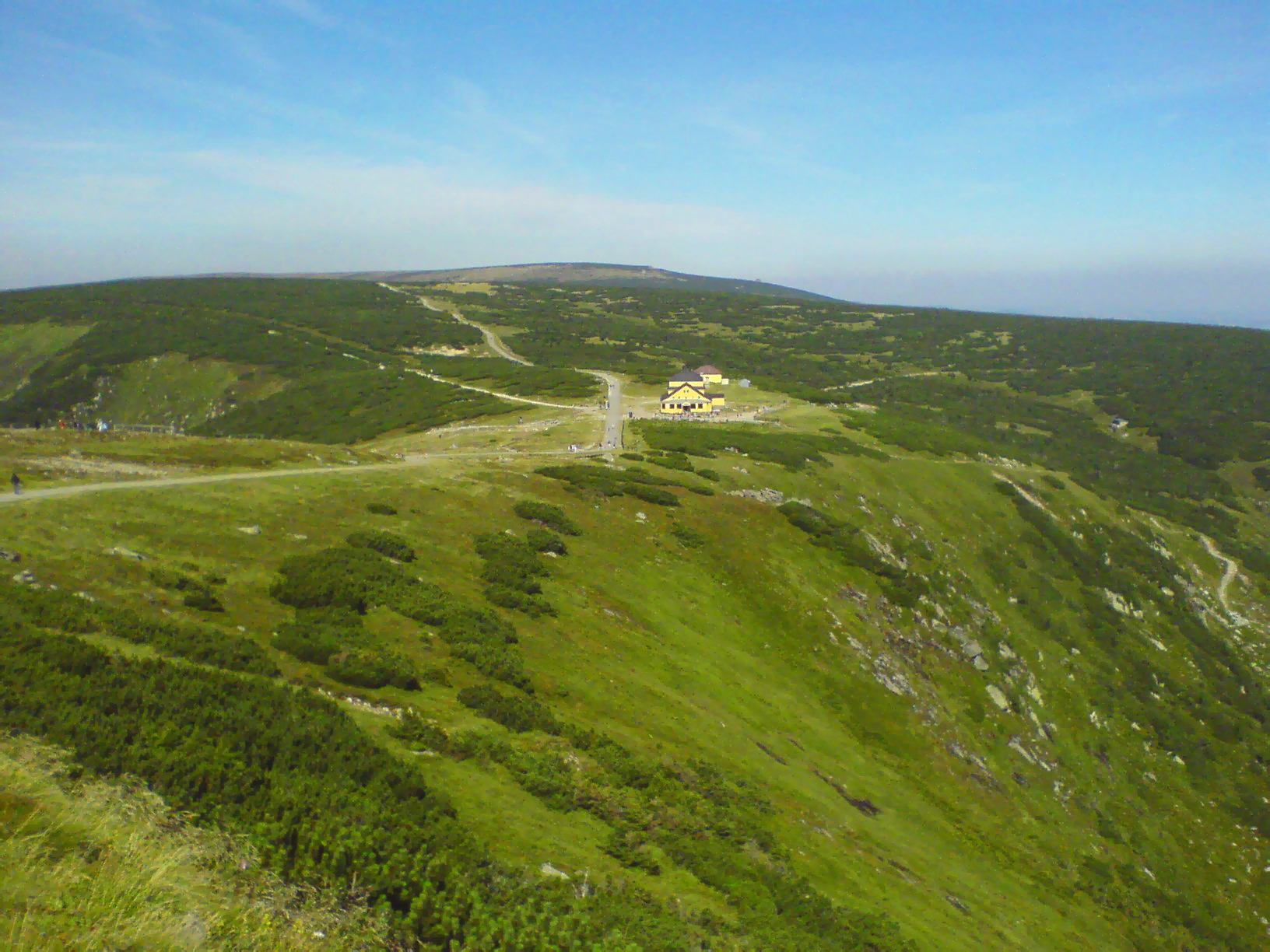
- View from Sněžka to the Równia pod Śnieżką

Highest point
- Elevation: 1,446 m (4,744 ft)
- Coordinates: 50°44′29″N 15°43′01″E

Dimensions
- Area: 9 km^{2} (3.5 mi^{2})

Geography
- Location within Poland Location within Czech Republic
- Countries: Poland and Czech Republic
- Parent range: Giant Mountains

The Równia pod Śnieżką ([ˈruvɲa pɔt ˈɕɲɛʂkɔw̃], Czech: Rovina pod Sněžkou, [ˈrovɪna pot ˈsɲɛʃkou]; lit. 'Sněžka Plateau') is a subalpine plateau in the Giant Mountains of Poland and the Czech Republic.

The plateau is situated west from the peak of Sněžka, between the mountains of Smogornia and Sněžka at 1,390–1,446 m above sea level. Its area is approximately 9 km^{2}, mostly covered in bogs, marshes and clumps of mountain pine. From both the Polish and Czech sides, the plateau is limited by glacial cirques.

== Tourism and hiking ==
At the eastern side of the plateau there is an important junction for the main path Polish–Czech Friendship Trail. Four mountain huts in the proximity are Dom Śląski, Samotnia, Strzecha Akademicka in Poland and Luční Bouda in the Czech Republic.
