= Łabski Szczyt =

Mountain in Poland and the Czech Republic

- Violík
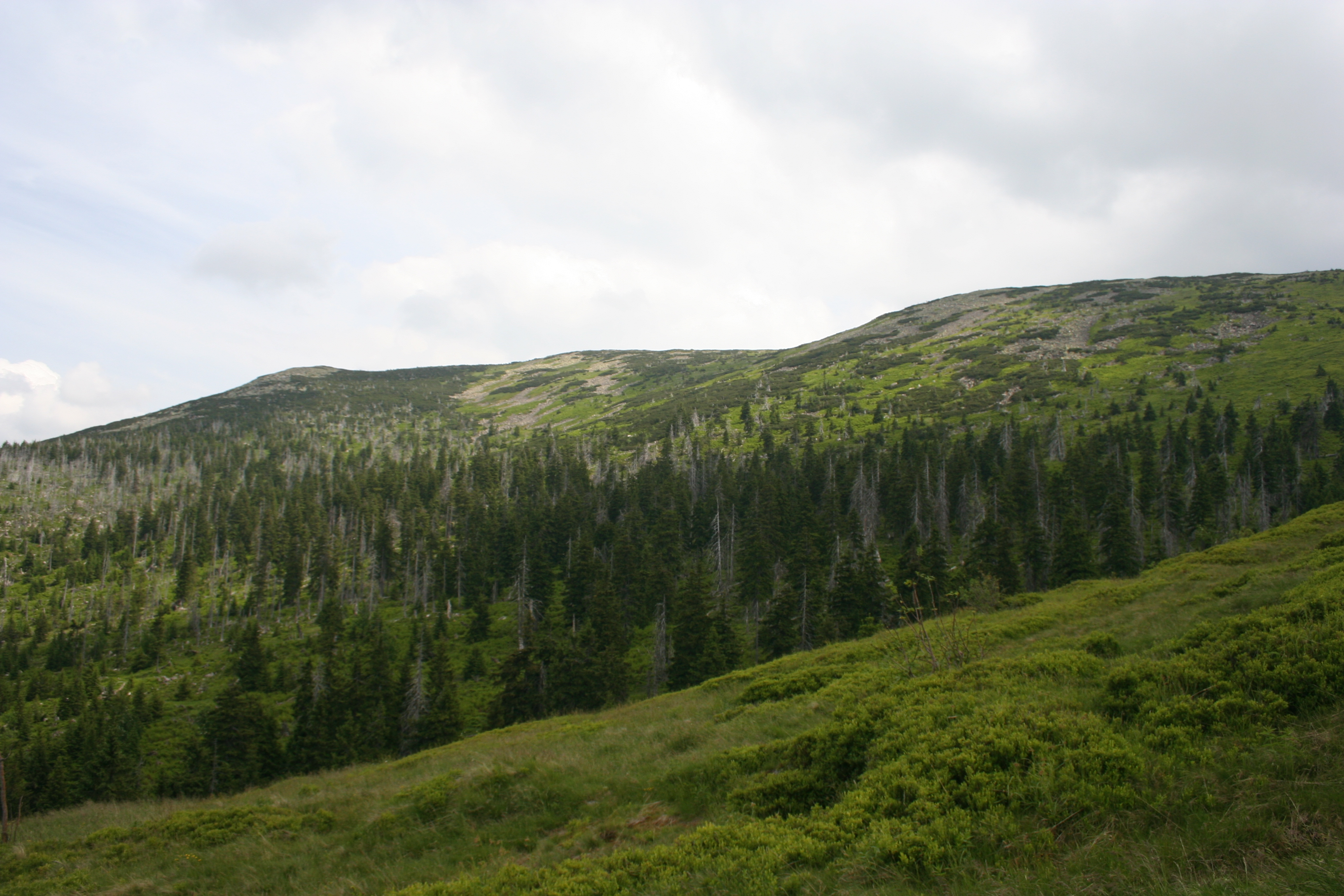
- The summit as seen from the mountain hut

Highest point
- Elevation: 1,471 m (4,826 ft)
- Prominence: < 166 m (545 ft)
- Listing: Slezský hřbet
- Coordinates: 50°46′50″N 15°32′44″E

Geography
- Location within Czech Republic Location within Poland
- Location: Czech Republic / Poland
- Parent range: Giant Mountains

Climbing
- Easiest route: public path marked red from Szklarska Poręba

Łabski Szczyt or Violík (in Polish and Czech; German: Veilchenstein) is a mountain peak located in the western Giant Mountains on the Czech–Polish border. The source of the Elbe River, one of Europe's major rivers, is situated on the southern, Czech slopes of the mountain.

== Situation ==
In the main range this very distinct peak is situated between Szrenica (separated from it by Mokra Pass) and Śnieżne Kotły, the next peak eastwards being Wielki Szyszak. The summit is entirely on the Polish side.

== Tourism ==
The Polish–Czech Friendship Trail crosses the summit. Two mountain huts in the vicinity: Polish Schronisko pod Łabskim Szczytem and Czech Labská bouda – a modern concrete eight floor block, completed in 1975, a representative of brutalist architecture.
