= Szrenica =

Peak in the Giant Mountains, Poland

- Jínonoš, Reifträger
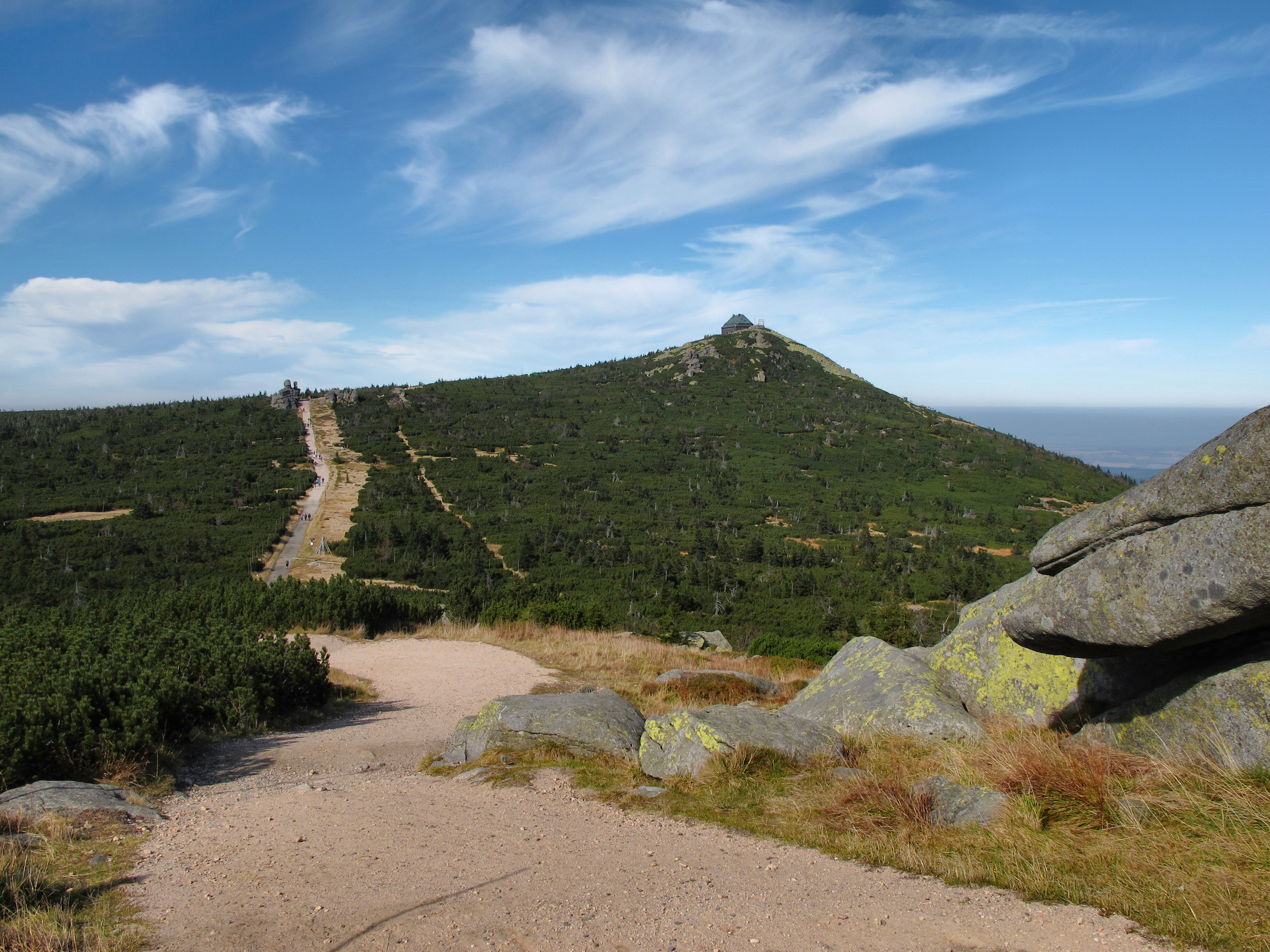
- The summit

Highest point
- Elevation: 1,362 m (4,469 ft)
- Coordinates: 50°47′34.53″N 15°30′46.32″E

Geography
- Location within Poland
- Location: Location on the Polish-Czech border
- Parent range: Giant Mountains

Climbing
- Easiest route: public path marked red from Szklarska Poręba

Szrenica (1,362 m a.s.l.; Czech: Jínonoš, German: Reifträger) is a mountain peak situated in the western part of Giant Mountains in Poland, very close to the Polish-Czech border, within the Karkonosze National Park. Its name originates from the Polish word szron (frost). There is a weather station situated close to the summit. The peak is deforested, both the southern and the northern parts are used intensively for skiing. The elevation gain compared to the main range is approximately 60 m (200 ft).

== Geology and geography ==
The mountain is built of finegrained granite which, due to weathering shaped standalone rocks and vaste granite fields covered in moss, covering eastern part of the slope.

== Tourism ==
There is a private mountain hut on the peak and a PTTK mountain shelter on the slope. The peak is accessible by chair lift (two part, with the transfer station). The slope has skiing facilities, including ski lifts and poles marking skiing trails in exposed and deforested areas. There are three routes for downhill skiing: Lolobrigida (4,444 m (14,580 ft)), Śnieżynka and FIS-approved Trasa Zjazdowa; all constitute the system, which is about 13 km-long (8.1 mi). Two tourist trails cross the summit: Główny Szlak Sudecki and Polish–Czech Friendship Trail which merge here.

== Weather ==
There is a mountain weather station at 1,331 m (4,367 ft), the property of the University of Wrocław. It was founded and consequently built in years 1950.

Average year measures obtained by the station:

- Average temperature of 12 subsequent months: −1.9 °C (28.6 °F)
- Average temperature of January (minimal of the year): −6.8 °C (19.8 °F)
- Average temperature of July (maximal of the year): 10 °C (50 °F)
- Maximal rainfall (maximal of the year): June 177 mm (7.0 in)
- Minimal rainfall (minimal of the year): January 72 mm (2.8 in)
- Relative humidity: 80%
- Fog: 264 days a year
- Sunny: 29 days
