= Śnieżne Kotły =

Coordinates: 50°47′00″N 15°34′00″E

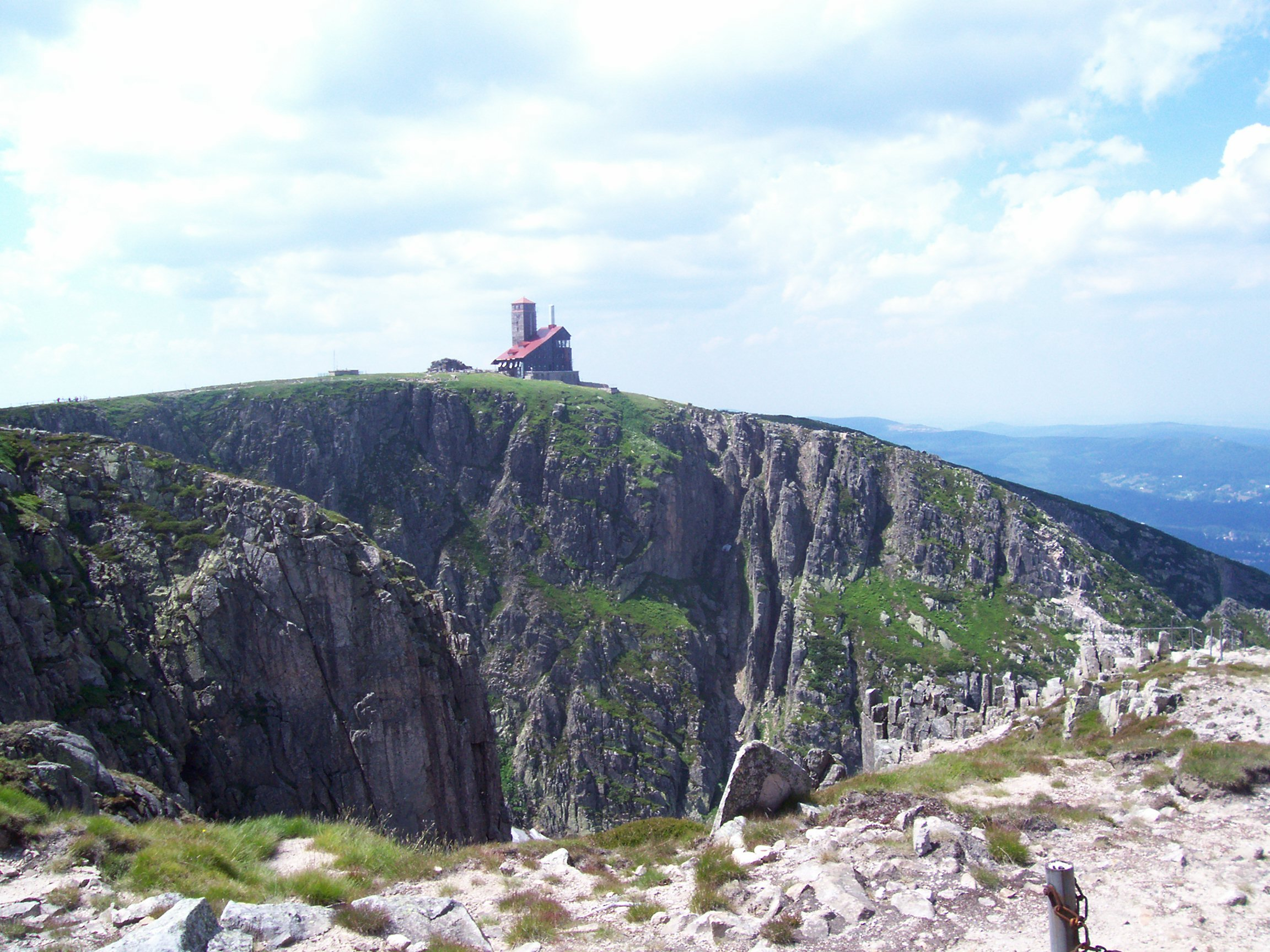
Śnieżne Kotły

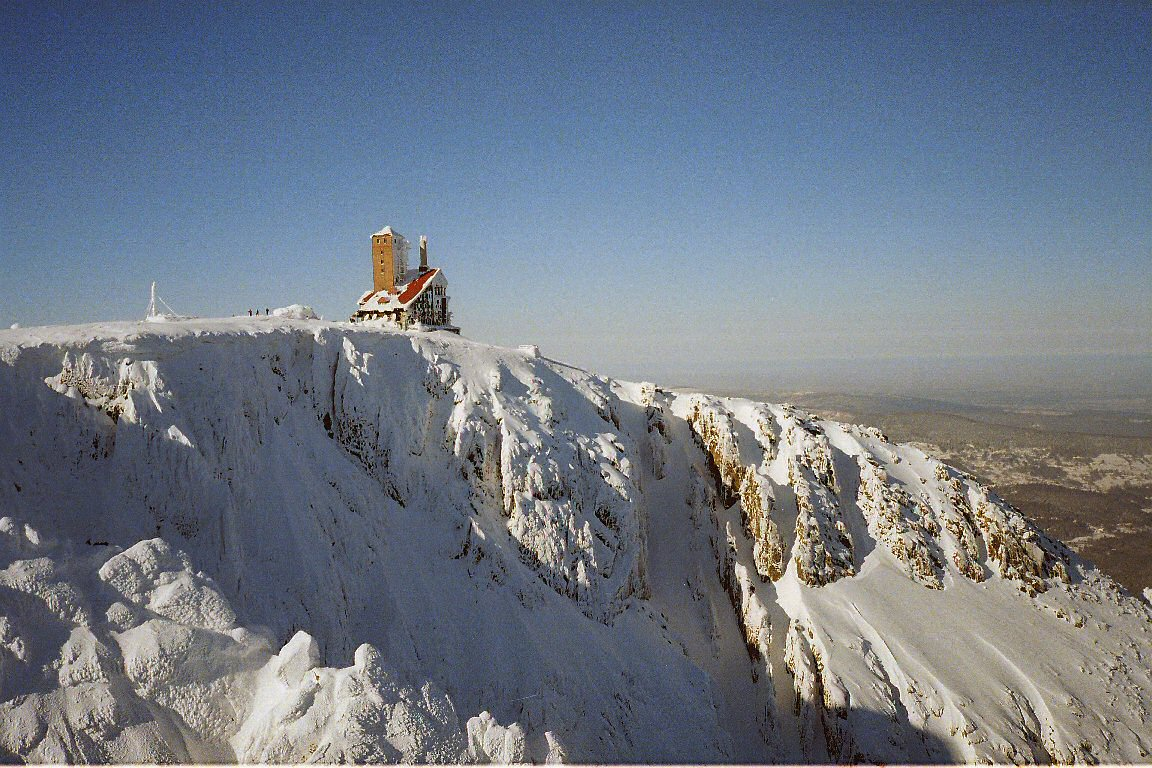
Winter landscape of Śnieżne Kotły; radio mast being a landmark

Śnieżne Kotły (1,175 m (3,855 ft), Czech: Sněžné jámy, German: Schneegruben, literally Snowy Pits, Snowy Cirque, Snowy Cwm) are two glacial cirques situated in Poland in the Sudetes in the Karkonosze National Park. They are a unique example of the alpine landscape in the area and have been a nature reserve since 1933.

== Description ==
The walls of both cirques are about 100 metres (330 ft) high and contain small tarn lakes. They were formed during the last phase of the glacial period and consist predominantly of granite. However, in two exposed places basalt is found. Some rare species of arctic and alpine plants appear in the cold and dark parts of the cirques: Pulsatilla alpina, Gentiana asclepiadea, Aconitum napellus, and this is the only place in the Sudetes where Micranthes nivalis appears. At the top of the larger cirque, at the Łabski Szczyt, there is a radio and television tower disguised as a building.

== Hiking and climbing ==
It is possible to climb the cirque walls, though climbing is permitted only in January and February and dangerous; since World War II there have been ten fatal accidents.

Hiking is possible: the Polish - Czech Friendship Trail, part of the Main Sudeten Trail, runs along the upper ridge of the cirques, close to the abyss. Also, a yellow trail from the mountain hut under the Łabski Peak (Polish: Schronisko pod Łabskim Szczytem) leads to the top of the cirques. The green trail leads through the bottom of the cirques.
