= Przełęcz Karkonoska =

Mountain pass in the Czech Republic and Poland

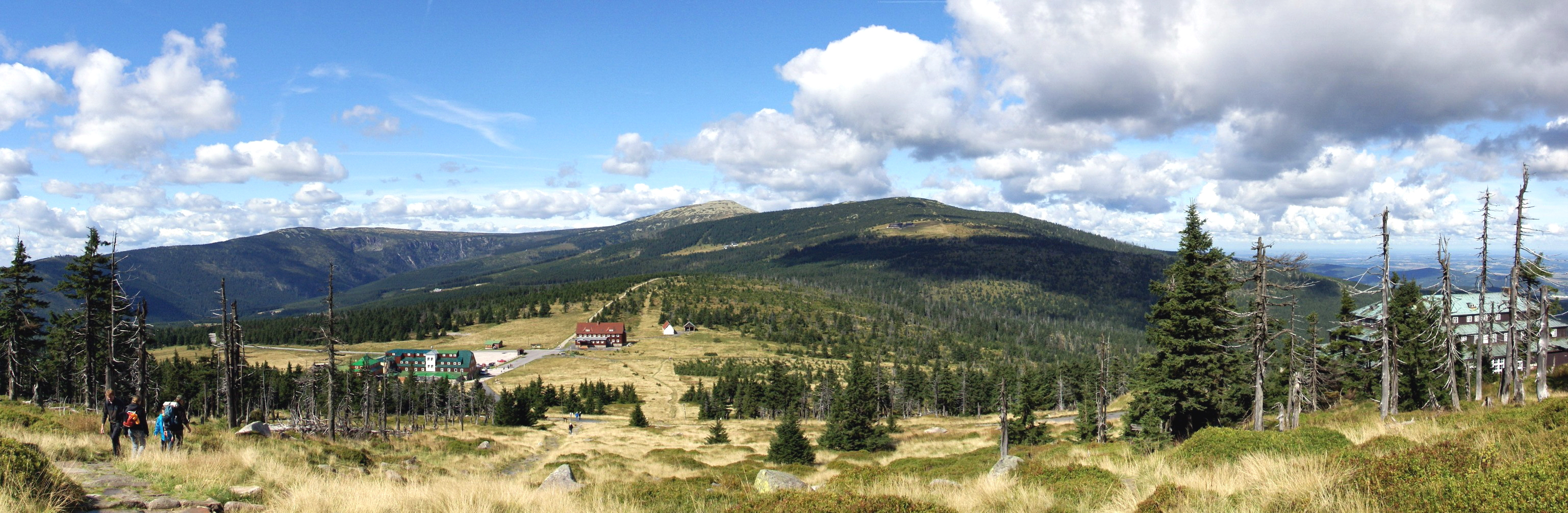
- Przełęcz Karkonoska in summer

- Location within Czech Republic Location within Poland
- Elevation: 1,197 m (3,927 ft)
- Traversed by: Road

Location
- Location: Poland, Czech Republic
- Range: Giant Mountains
- Coordinates: 50°45′46″N 15°38′2″E

Przełęcz Karkonoska or Karkonosze Pass (Czech: Slezské sedlo, lit. 'Silesian Pass') is a mountain pass in the central Giant Mountains on the Czech–Polish border. At 1,197 m (3,927 ft), it is the lowest point of the main ridge of the Giant Mountains.

In the Czech Republic, the area is also referred to as Špindlerova bouda ("Špindler's Hut"), after a mountain hut located there. Another chalet, situated on the Polish side of the border, is called Odrodzenie.

== Tourism ==
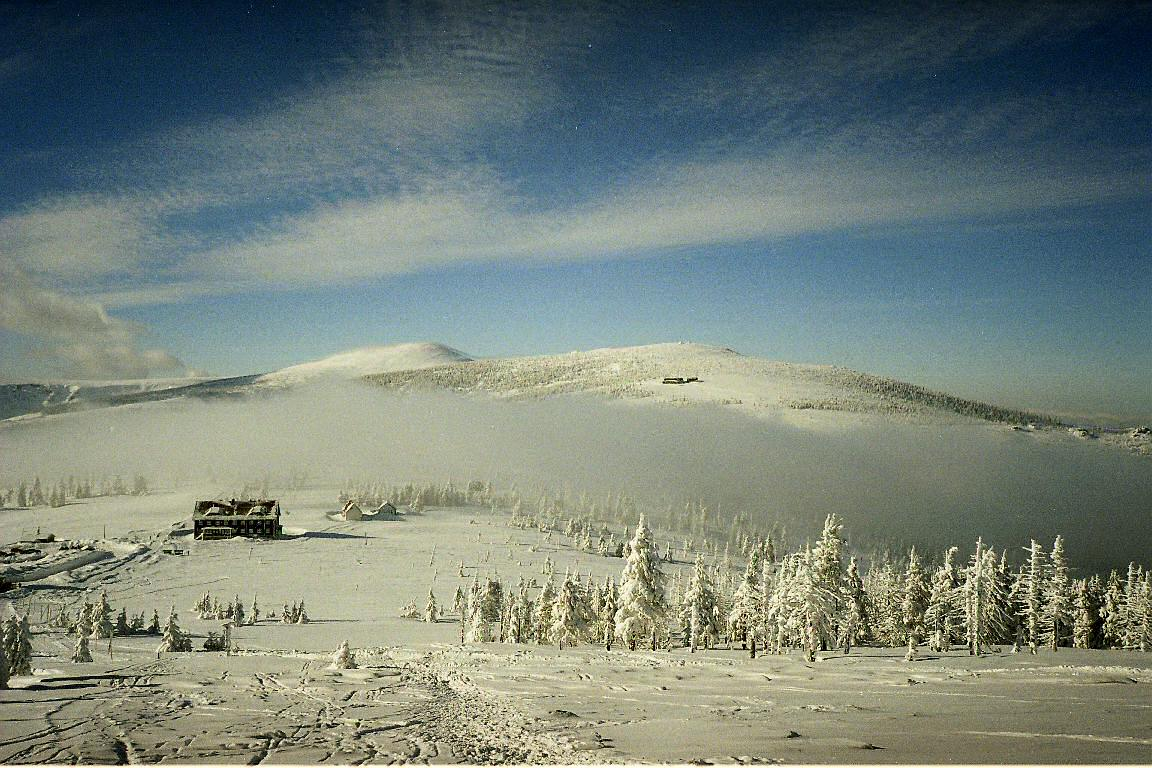
Przełęcz Karkonoska in winter

The pass is accessible by a road either from Špindlerův Mlýn, served by bus, or from Poland. The Polish road is said to be one the steepest roads in Poland with the average inclination 7.2%, reaching 24% at maximum. Although road quality on the Polish side is relatively poor, the pass is much sought after by mountain bikers. The pass is a hub of hiking trails, including the Polish–Czech Friendship Trail.

== History ==
During World War II, the area was incorporated into Nazi Germany along with the Sudetes. At that time, the Nazis held the Allied prisoners of war in the Špindlerova bouda mountain hut. On the other hand, the Silesian (today Polish) mountain hut, was confiscated by Nazis as a property of a Jew and converted into a boarding house for Hitlerjugend members, and later into a hotel for Nazi officers.

Following the Fall of Communism, presidents of Czechoslovakia and Poland met at the Przełęcz Karkonoska in 1990.

== See also ==
- List of highest paved roads in Europe
- List of mountain passes
