= Okraj =

Mountain pass in Poland and the Czech Republic

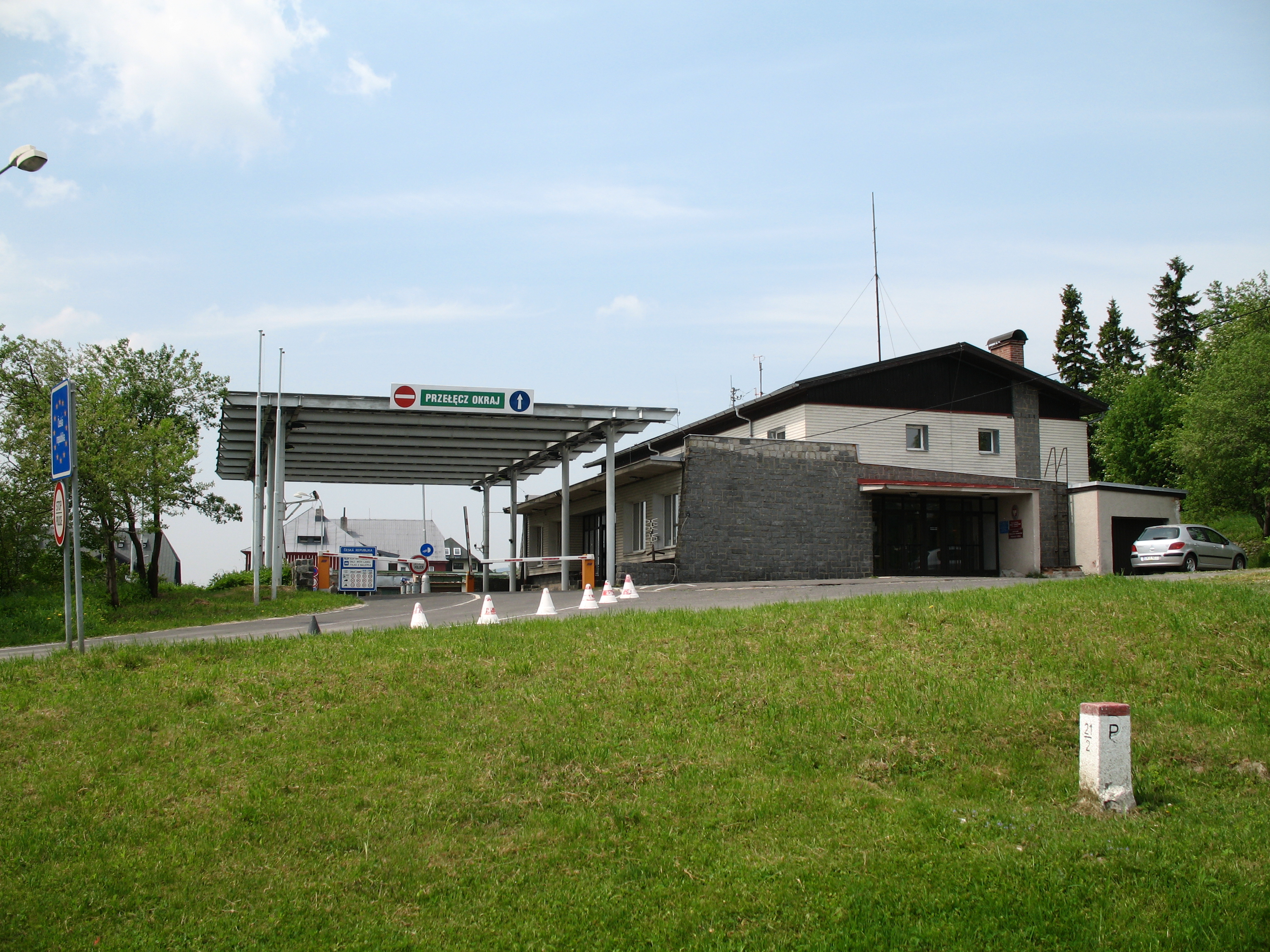
- Former checkpoint on the Polish and Czech border

- Location within Europe
- Elevation: 1,046 metres (3,432 ft)

Third Approach
- Location: Poland–Czech Republic border
- Range: Krkonoše, Karkonosze
- Coordinates: 50°45′N 15°49′E

Okraj (el. 1,046 m or 3,432 ft) is a mountain pass in Poland and the Czech Republic, on the eastern end of Krkonoše, Karkonosze, separating two side ranges of the mountains. Former checkpoint, dismounted in 2007 after the implementation of the Schengen Agreement.

There are Polish and Czech mountain huts as well as some hotels and restaurants on the Czech side, belonging to the village of Malá Úpa. The pass is accessible with the tarmac road from both sides. The road, connecting Jelenia Góra and Trutnov was built by Germans in 1937; the next year it was used to invade Czechoslovakia. Hiking and mountain bike trails connect this place to towns and villages in valleys; bus connection also is available.

== See also ==
- List of highest paved roads in Europe
- List of mountain passes
