= Smogornia =

Mountain in Poland and the Czech Republic

- Czech: Stříbrný hřbet German: Mittagsberg
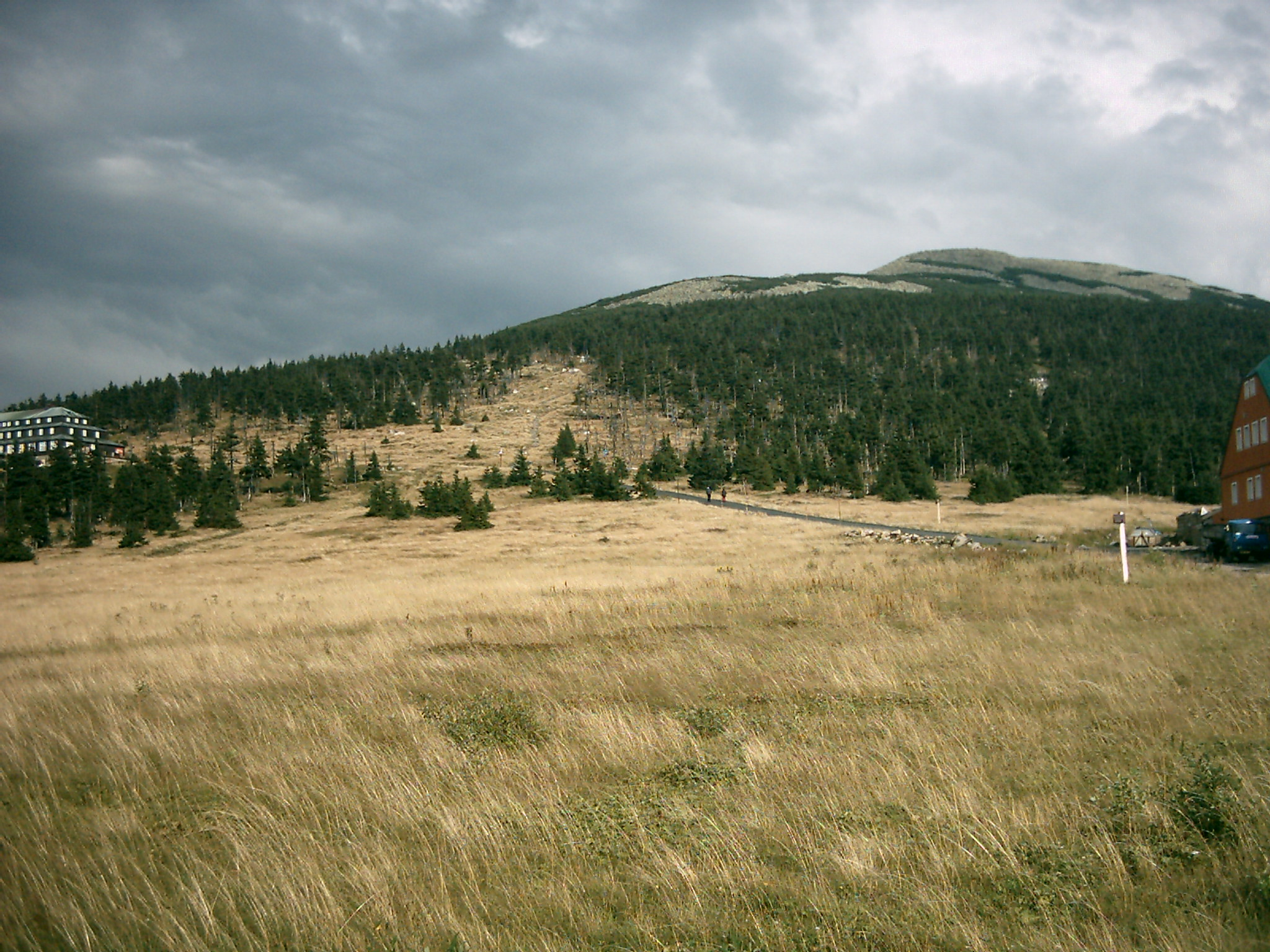
- Giant Mountains Pass, Mały Szyszak and Smogornia in the background

Highest point
- Elevation: 1,489 m (4,885 ft)
- Coordinates: 50°46′17″N 15°41′0″E

Geography
- Location within Czech Republic
- Location: Poland; Czech Republic
- Parent range: Giant Mountains

Climbing
- Easiest route: public path marked red from Giant Mountains Pass

Smogornia (Polish pronunciation: [smɔˈgɔrɲa], Czech: Stříbrný hřbet, [ˈstr̝̊iːbr̩niː ɦr̝bɛt], German: Mittagsberg) is a 1,489 m (4,885 ft) peak in the Giant Mountains, on the Czech–Polish border. It is situated in the eastern part of the main range.

The peak is not accessible; the Main Sudetes Trail and Polish–Czech Friendship Trail traverse the mountain c. 300 m north from the peak. On the northern slope of the mountain there is a glacial cirque. The mountain has mild slopes and is mostly deforested, covered in mountain pine.
