= Giant Mountains National Park =

National park in Poland

Coordinates: 50°46′N 15°39′E

- Karkonoski Park Narodowy
- IUCN category II (national park)
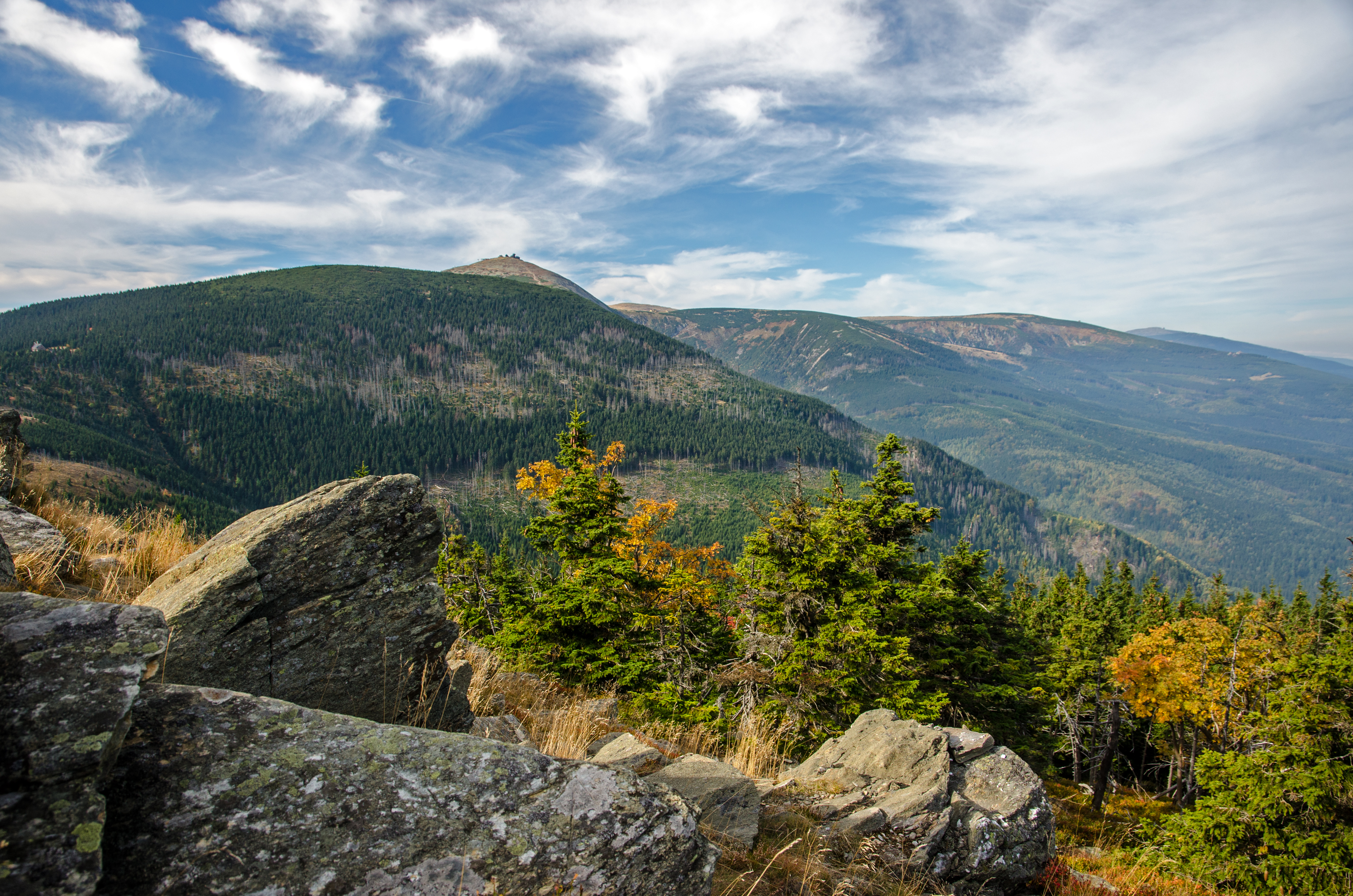
- View from Szrenica towards the West Park logo with Giant Mountains skyline
- Location: Lower Silesian Voivodeship
- Nearest city: Karpacz, Jelenia Góra
- Area: 55.76 km^{2} (21.53 sq mi)
- Established: 1959
- Governing body: Ministry of the Environment
- Website: Official website

Ramsar Wetland
- Official name: Subalpine peatbogs in Giant Mountains
- Designated: 29 October 2002
- Reference no.: 1566

Giant Mountains National Park (Polish: Karkonoski Park Narodowy) is a National Park in the Giant Mountains in the Sudetes in southwestern Poland, along the border with the Czech Republic.

The national park is located in Lower Silesian Voivodeship, in the highest part of the Sudetes. It was created in 1959, covering an area of 55.10 km^{2}. Today it is slightly larger at 55.76 km^{2} (21.53 sq mi), of which 17.18 km^{2} is strictly protected. The majority of the park area, around 33.80 km^{2}, consists of forests. In 1992 Karkonosze National Park, together with the neighbouring Czech Krkonoše National Park, became part of the Krkonoše/Karkonosze Transboundary Biosphere Reserve under UNESCO’s Man and the Biosphere Programme. Also, 40 hectares of peat bogs were designated a Ramsar international wetland site.

== Geography ==
The Giant Mountains are the highest range of the much broader Sudetes mountains stretching horizontally from south-western Poland along the northern border of the Czech Republic to eastern Germany. Its highest peak is Śnieżka at 1,602 metres (5,256 ft) above sea level, forming a triangle with (similarly sounding) Śnieżnik, 1,424 metres (4,672 ft), as well as Ślęża peak, further apart. They are connected by a red hiking trail only for qualified tourists. The characteristic features of its landscape are the glacial kettles with boulders and ponds hidden inside. Weathered granite rocks shaped like mushrooms or maces can also be found on the mountainsides.

The Giant Mountains are situated on the division of the European water system between the basins of two major rivers – the Elbe and the Oder – which means that it also separates the basins of the Baltic Sea and North Sea. Many of the local streams come down the hills, creating waterfalls, the largest of which in the Polish part of the mountains (300 m) is created by the Łomniczka stream.

There are about 100 various birds living in the park, the most numerous of animal species living there. In the higher parts of the mountains there are fewer species of them; in the lower levels there are 100 varieties, but in the peaks there are not more than 10. The park has four species of fish, six species of amphibians, and five species of reptiles. The park's attraction are mouflons, brought here at the beginning of the 20th century.

Karkonosze National Park is visited by more than 1.5 million tourists yearly. They can use 112 kilometres of walking paths, 10 ski lifts and 12 guest houses. The park has its headquarters in the town of Jelenia Góra.

== See also ==
- National Parks of Poland

== Gallery ==
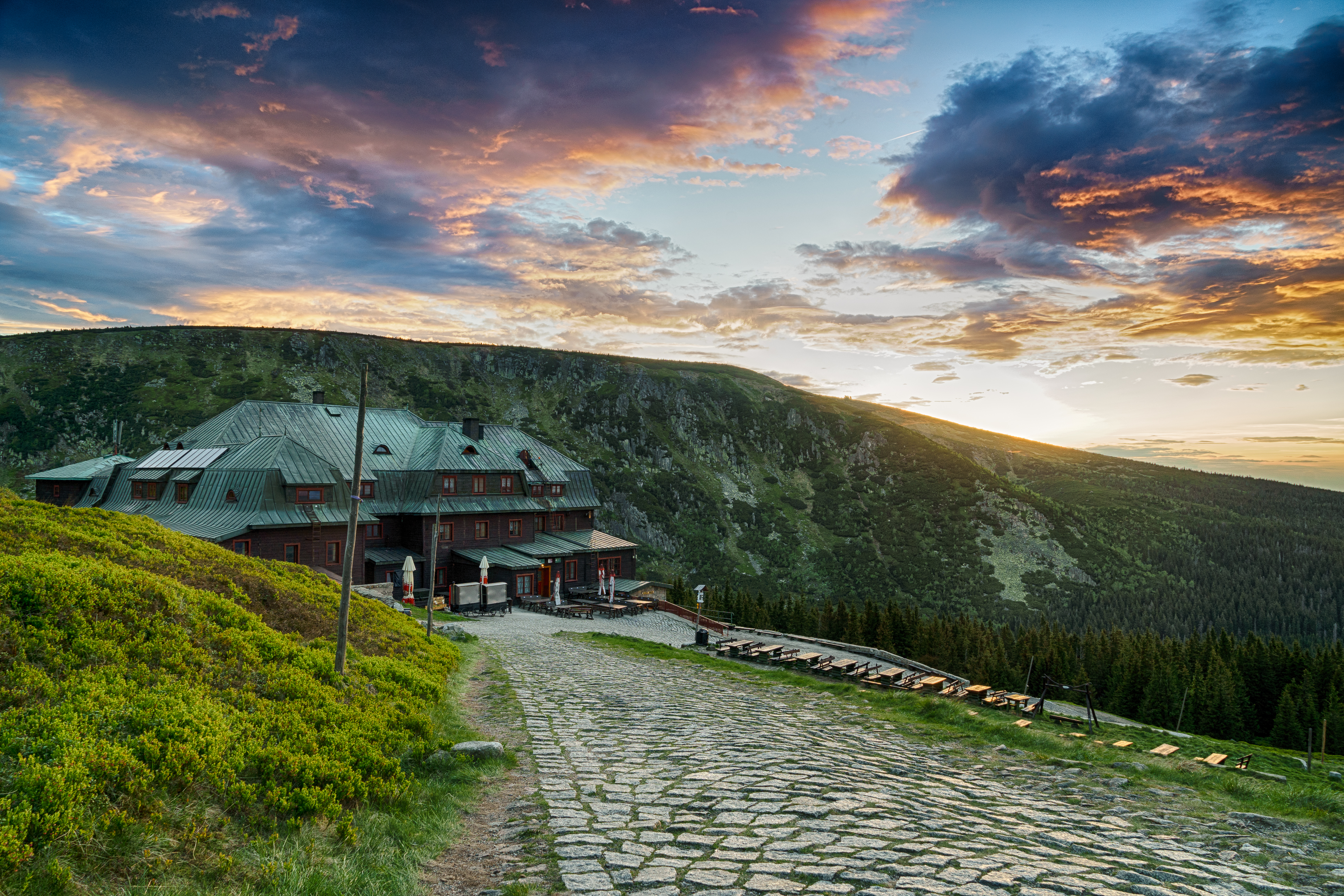
Strzecha Akademicka refuge

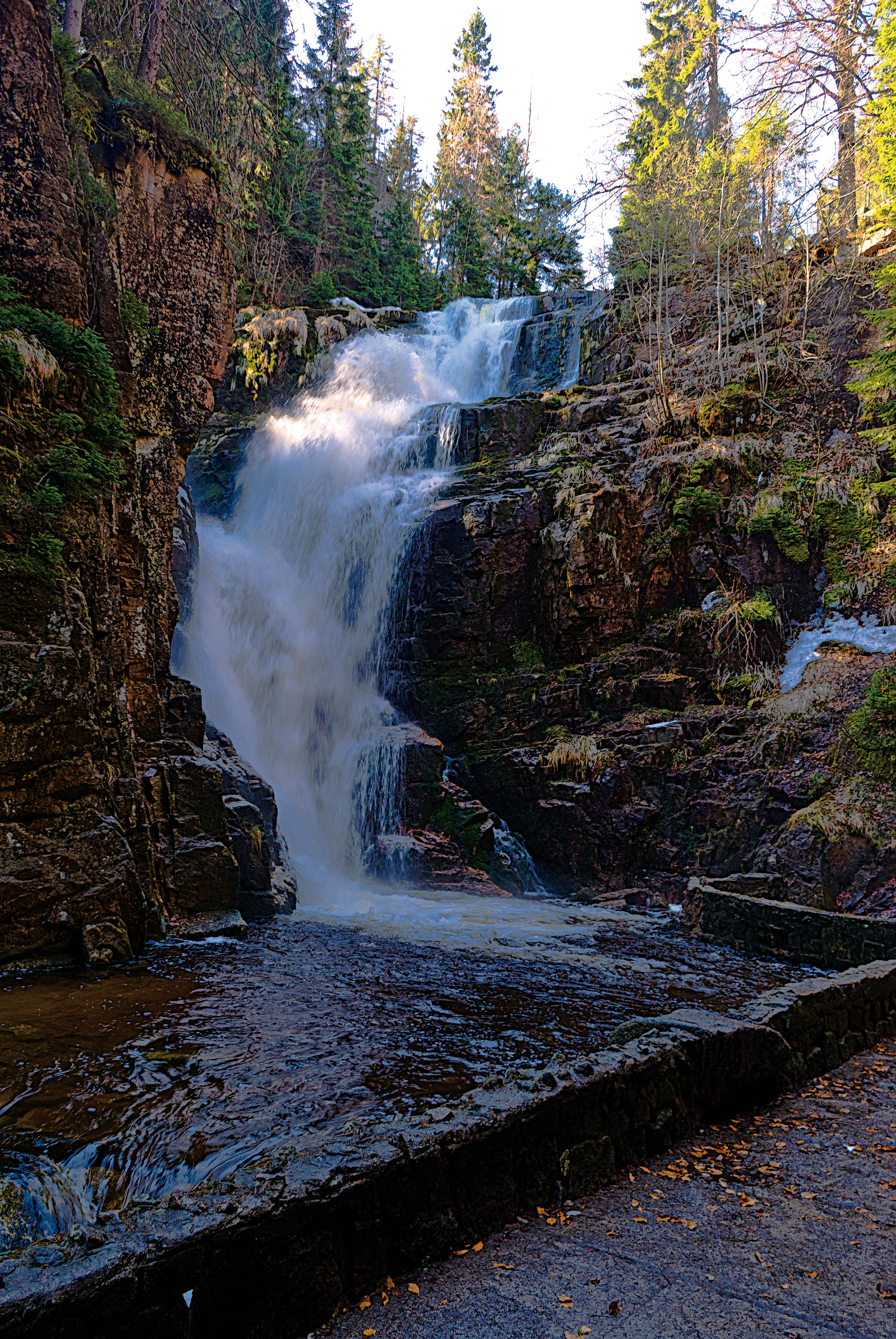
Kamieńczyk Falls

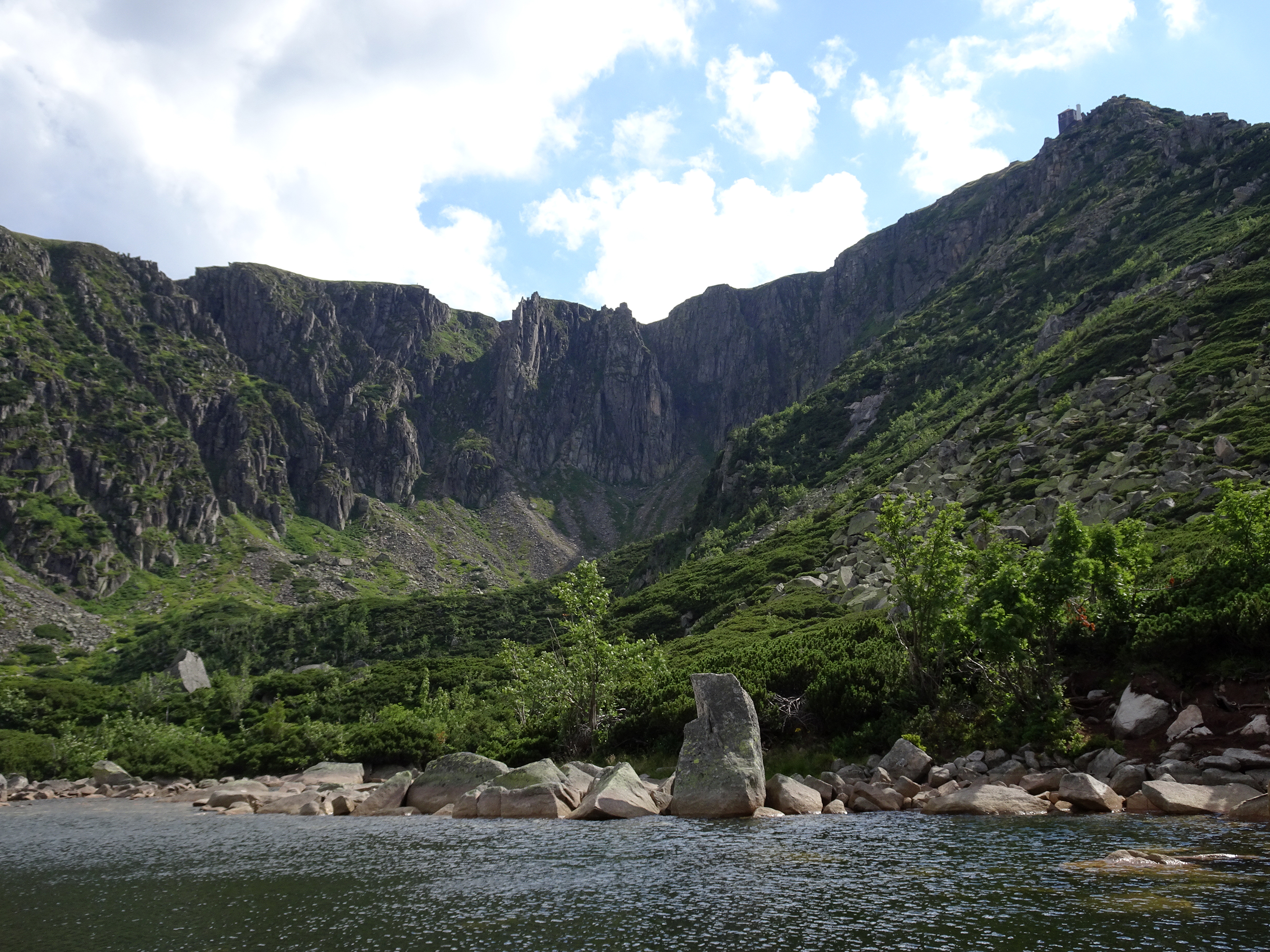
Snowy Pits

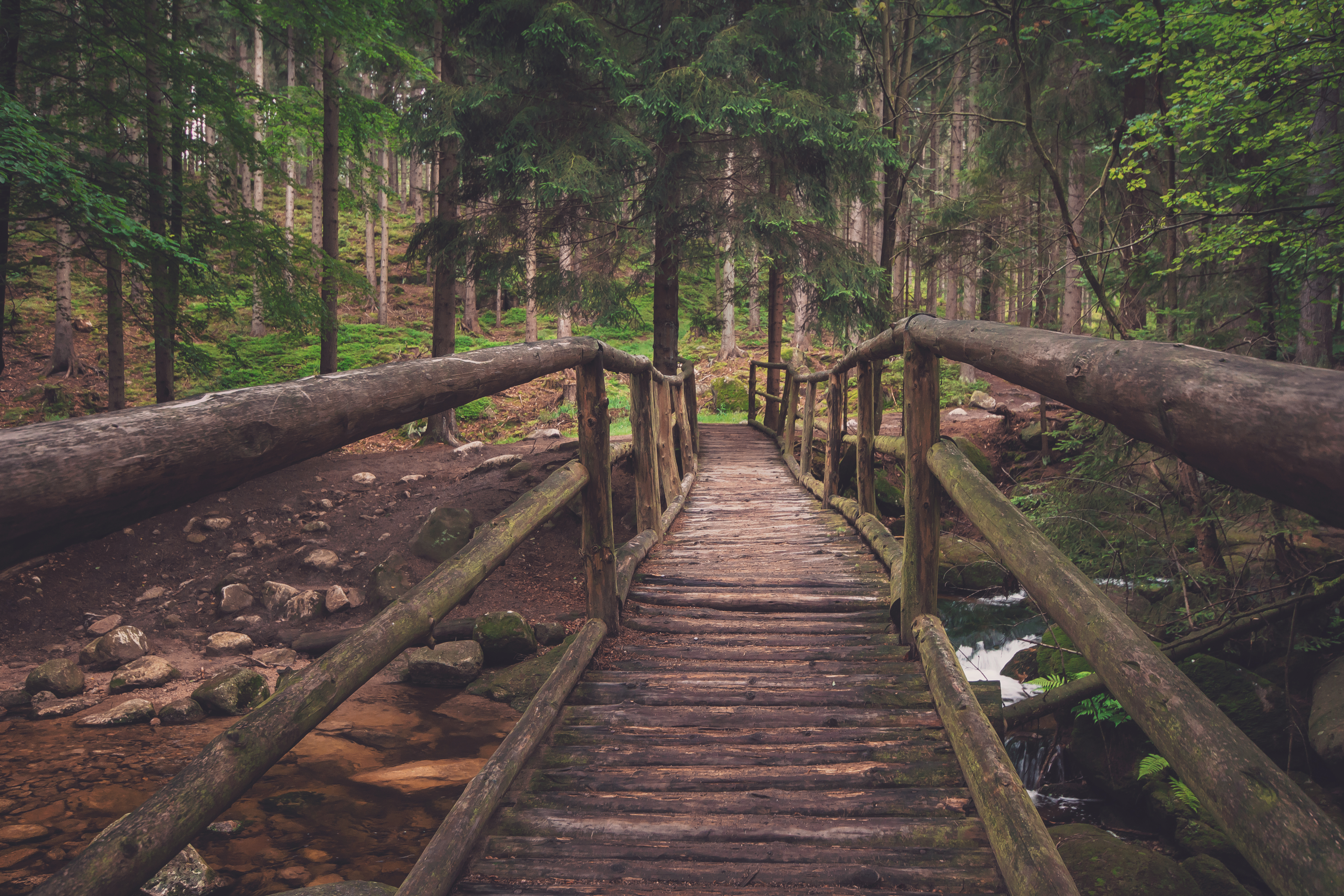
Czeska Kładka

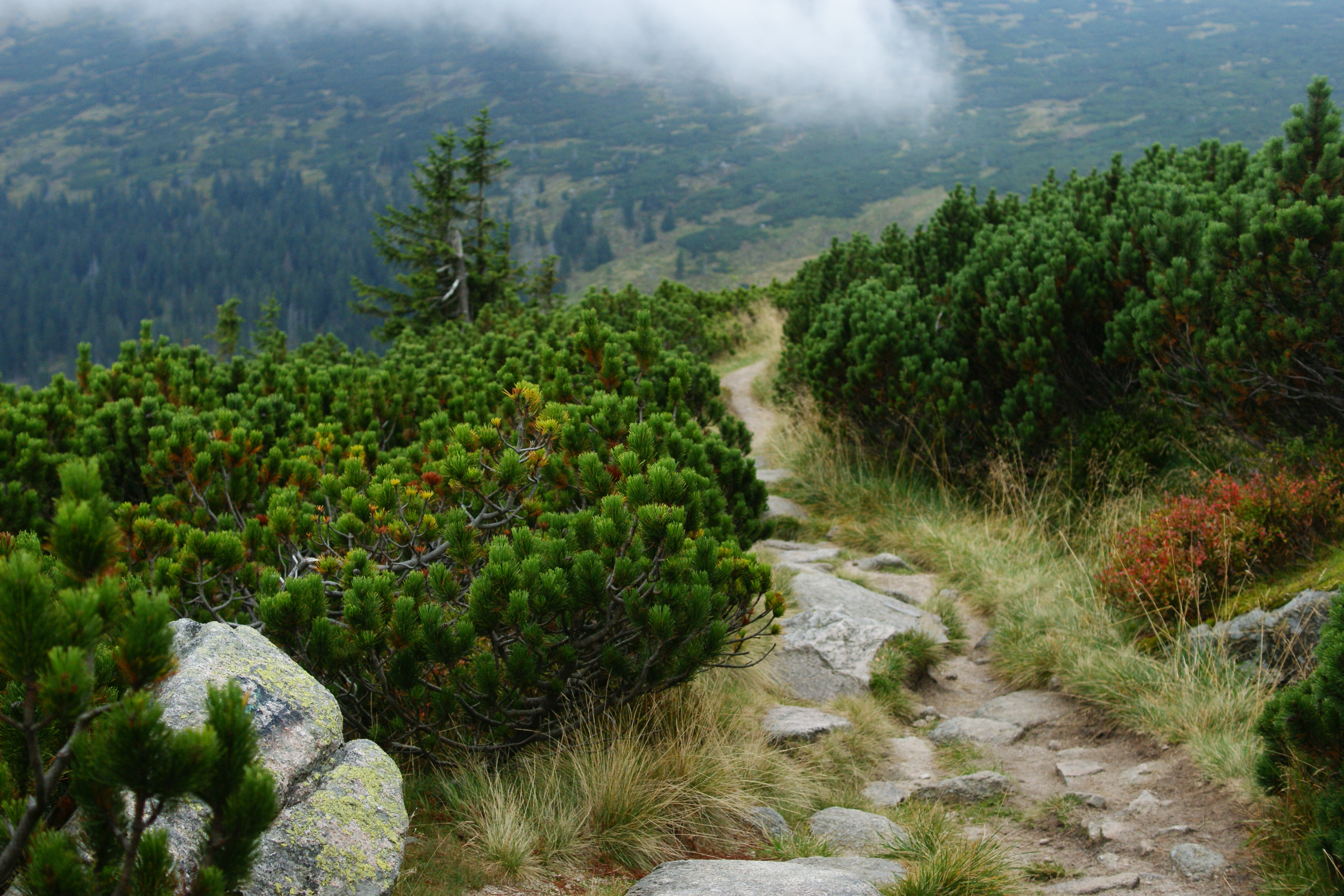
Mugo pine

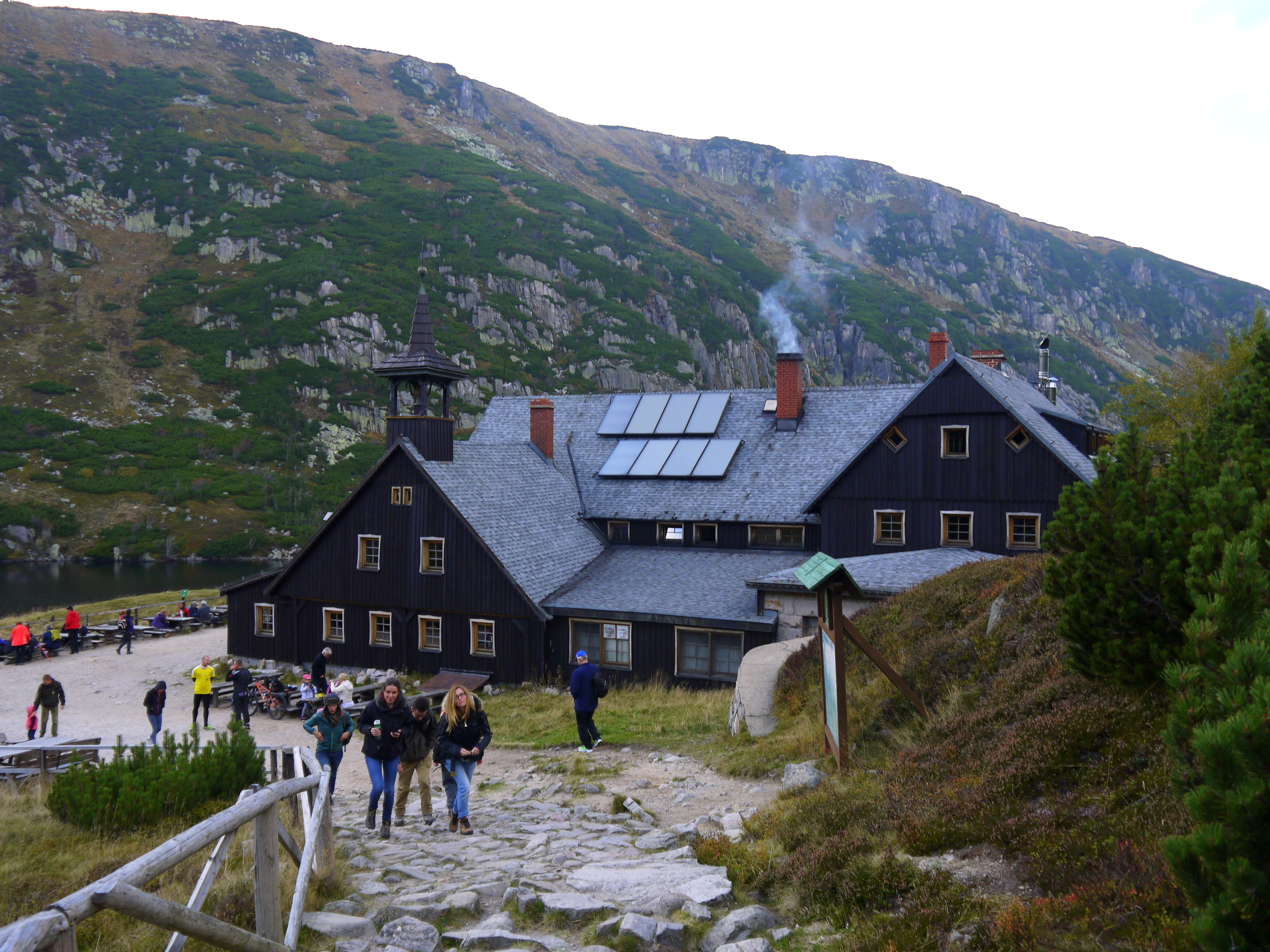
Samotnia refuge

Śnieżka

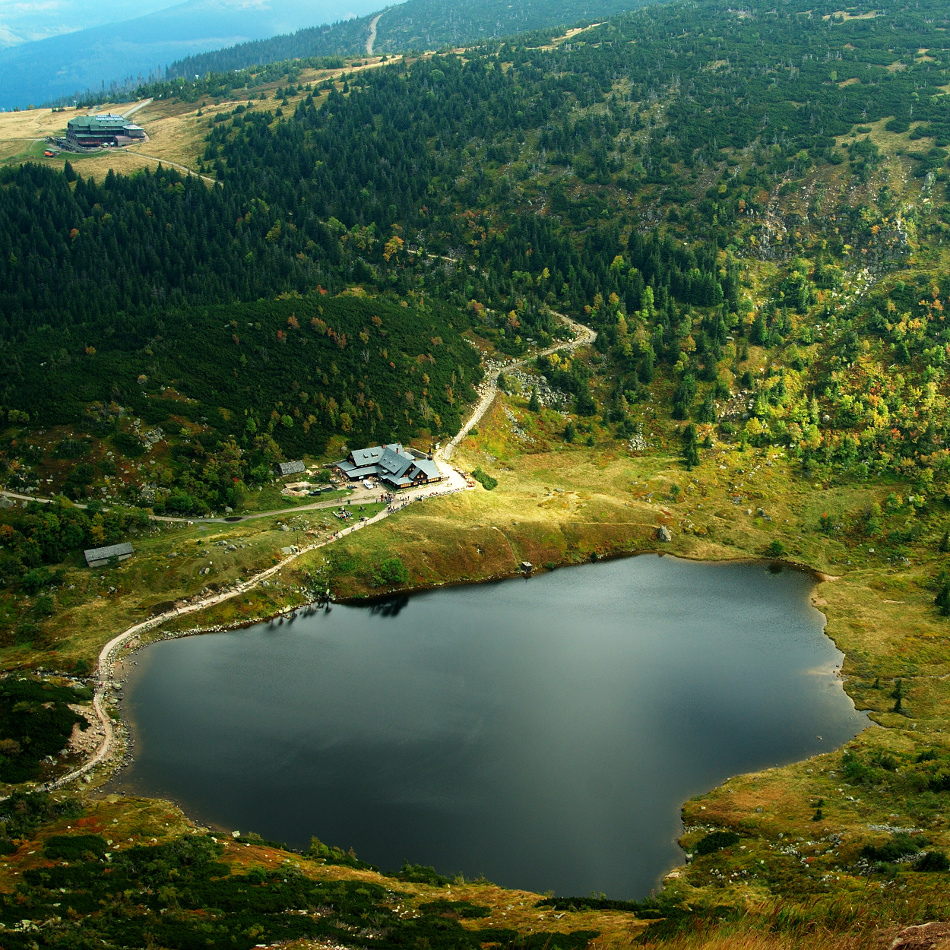
Mały Staw

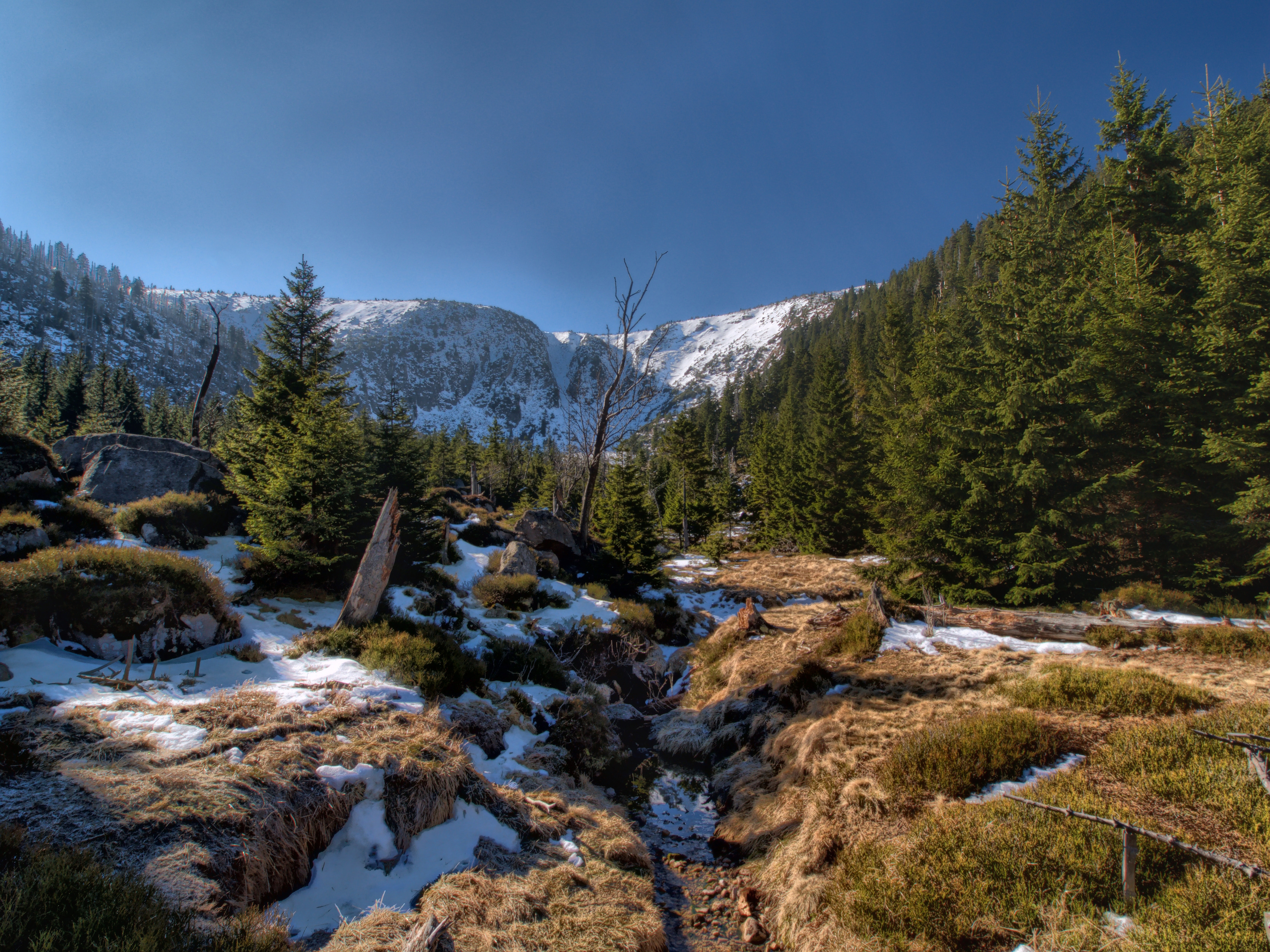
Czarny Kocioł Jagniątkowski
