= Jelenia Góra Valley =

Intermontane basin in south-western Poland

Coordinates: 50°55′00″N 15°45′00″E

- Polish: Kotlina Jeleniogórska; Silesian: Kotlina Lelýniohorski; German: Hirschberger Tal
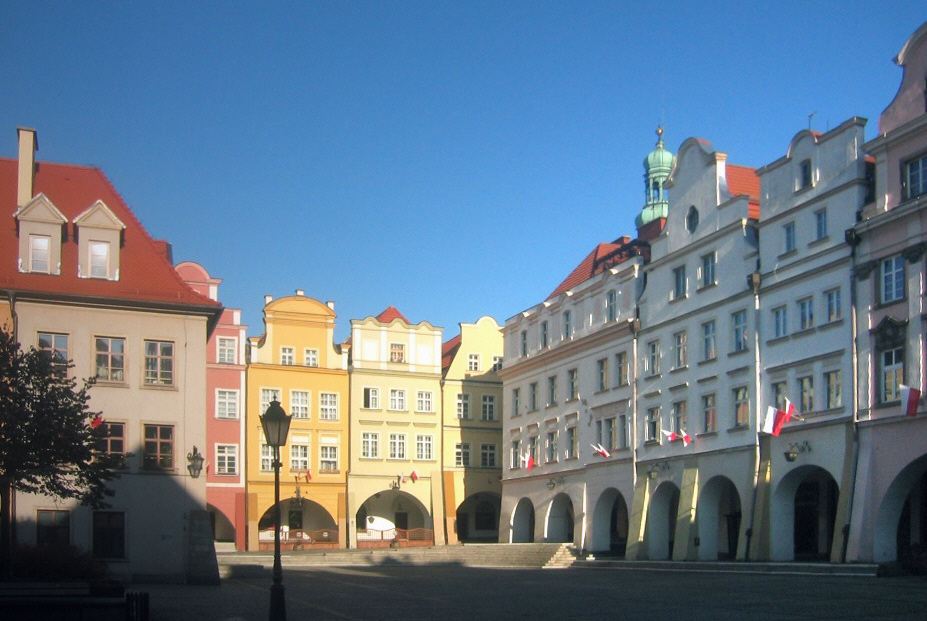
- Market place of Jelenia Góra, centre of the Jelenia Góra Valley

Highest point
- Peak: Krzywousty
- Elevation: 375 m (1,230 ft)

Geography
- Country: Poland
- Voivodeship: Lower Silesian
- Parent range: Western Sudetes

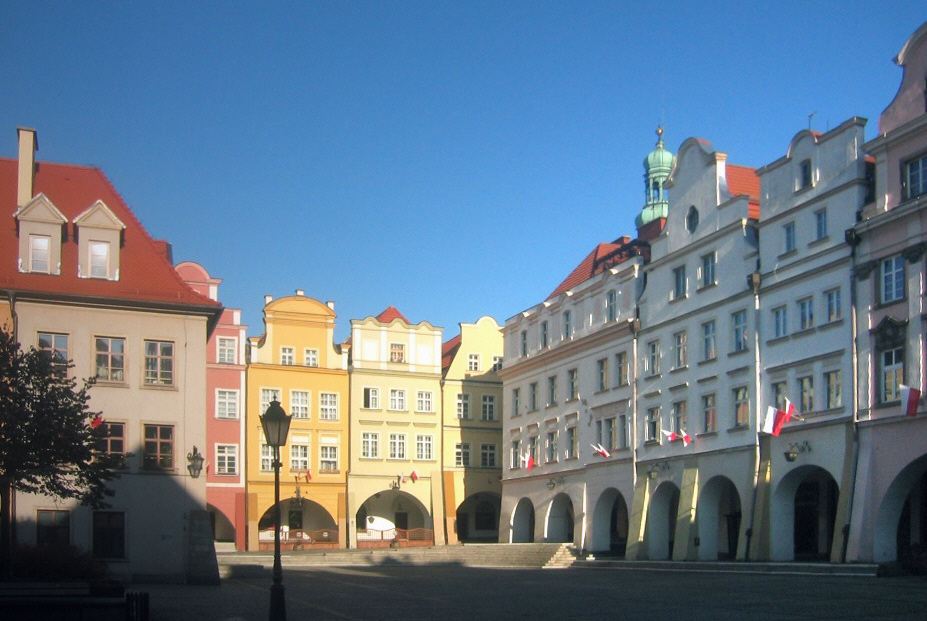
Market place of Jelenia Góra, centre of Jelenia Góra valley

Jelenia Góra Valley (Literally "Deer Mountain Valley") in Poland is a big valley at the Silesian northern side of the Western Sudetes and next to Kłodzko Valley the largest intermontane basin of the Sudetes. It is situated at an altitude of 250–400 meters above sea level and covers an area of 273 km^{2}. In the 19th century, the lovely landscape attracted the Prussian high nobility, which built magnificent palaces, manors and parks. The enormous number of stately homes turned the valley into one of the most important garden landscapes in Middle Europe.

The palaces and landscape parks of the Jelenia Góra valley represent one of Poland's official national Historic Monuments (Pomnik historii), as designated on 20 September 2011. Its listing is maintained by the National Heritage Board of Poland.

== Geography ==
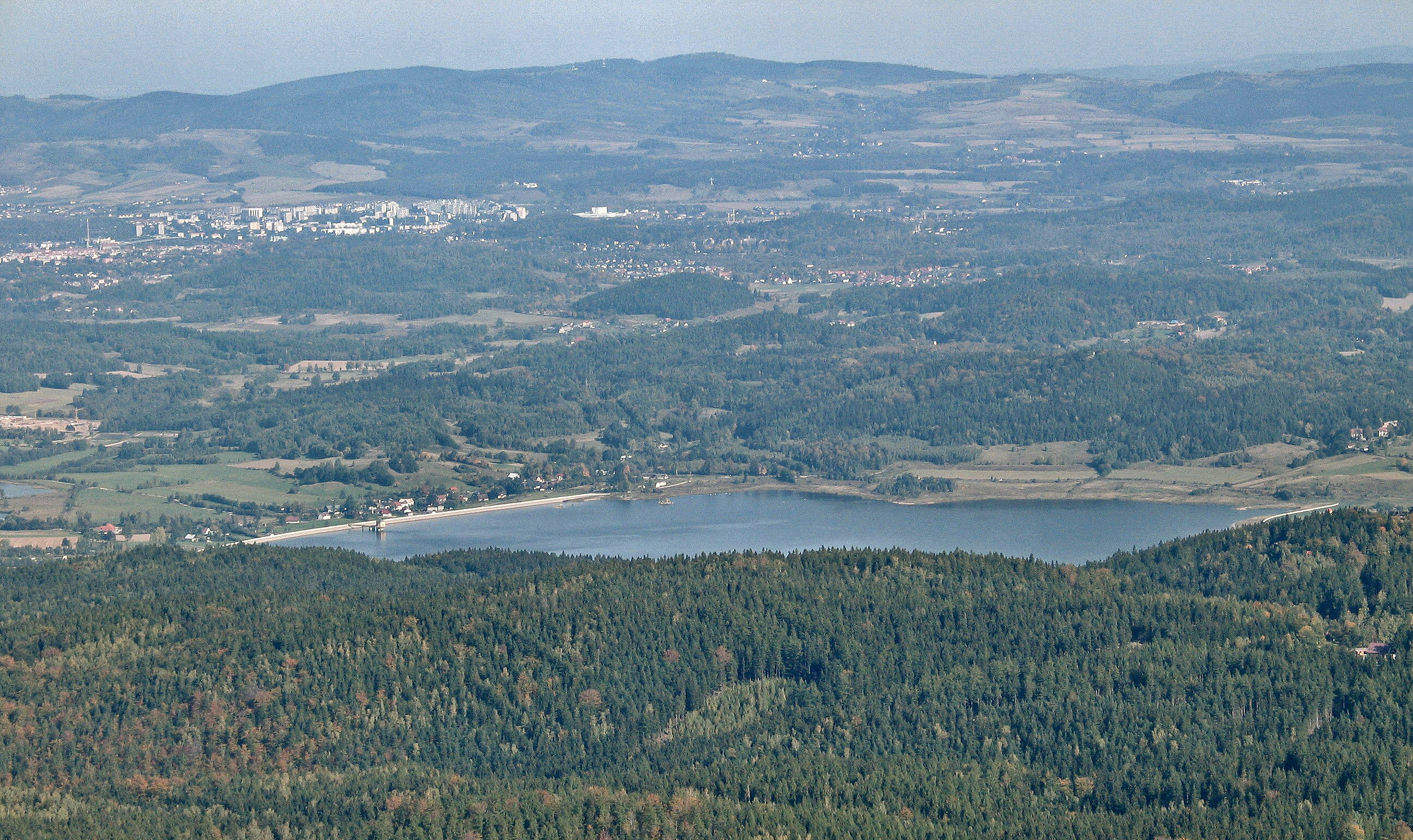
Jelenia Góra Valley - view from Karkonosze (Giant) Mountains to Kaczawskie Mountains.

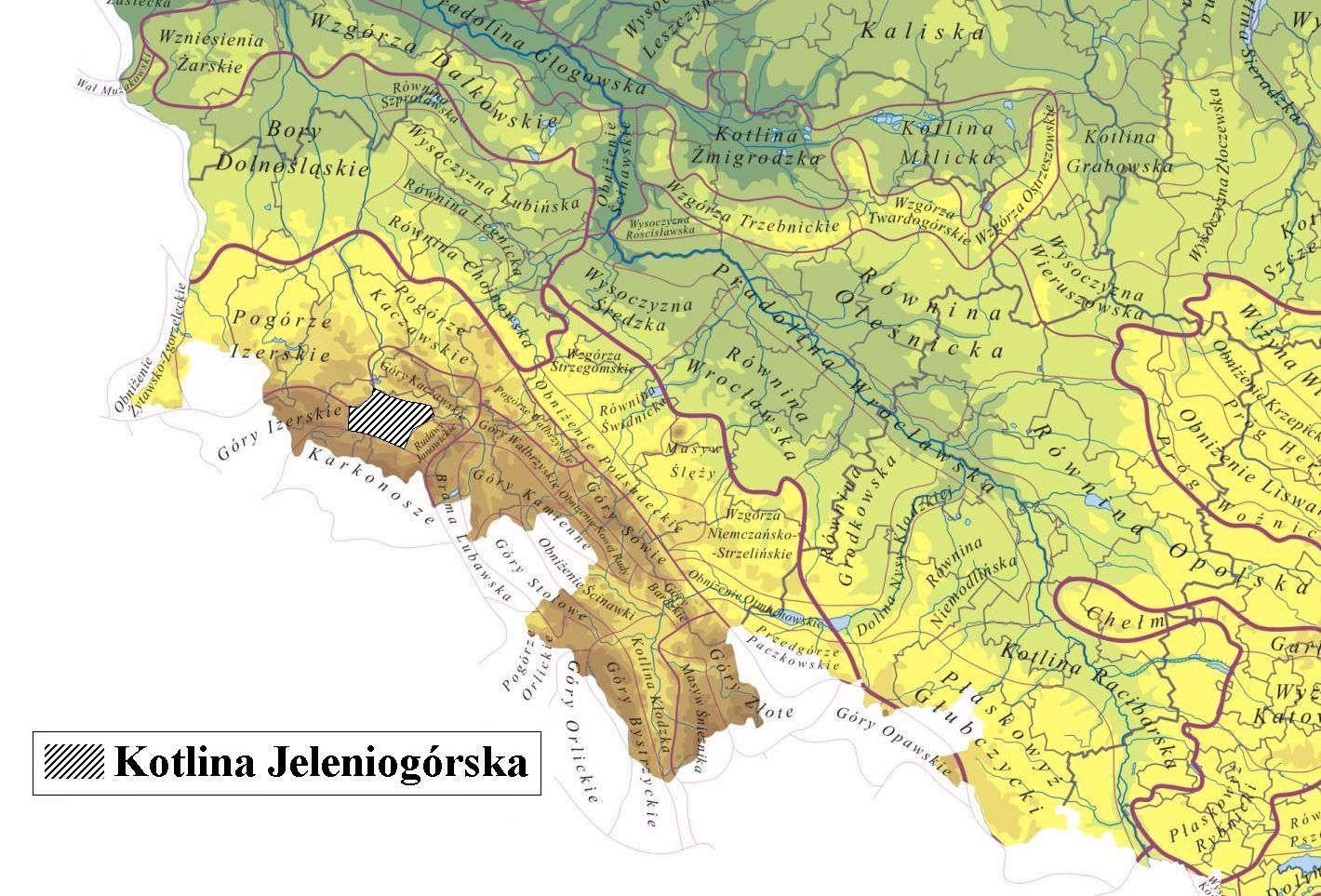
Jelenia Góra valley within the geomorphological division of Poland

Jelenia Góra valley is surrounded by parts of the Sudetes mountains. It lies at the foot of the Karkonosze, which are also its southern limit. In the east it borders the Rudawy Janowickie, in the west the Jizera Mountains and in the north to the Kaczawskie Mountains. River Bóbr runs through the valley along its northern side, its tributaries Łomnica and Kamienna flow, from the southeast and south-west, along the eastern and western side of the valley and open out near since Jelenia Góra into the Bóbr. The name of the valley derives from Jelenia Góra, which is also the most important town of the Silesian Karkonosze.

The valley is characterised by ridges which are separated by smaller basins. Wzgórza Karpnickie near Karpniki is the easternmost ridge, followed by Obniżenie Mysłakowickie basin near Mysłakowice to the west, Wzgórza Łomnickie ridge to the southeast of Cieplice Śląskie-Zdrój (a spa district of Jelenia Góra), the wide basin Obniżenie Sobieszowa near Sobieszów, Wysoczyzna Rybnicy ridge north west of Piechowice and Starej Kamienicy basin near Stara Kamienica.

== History ==
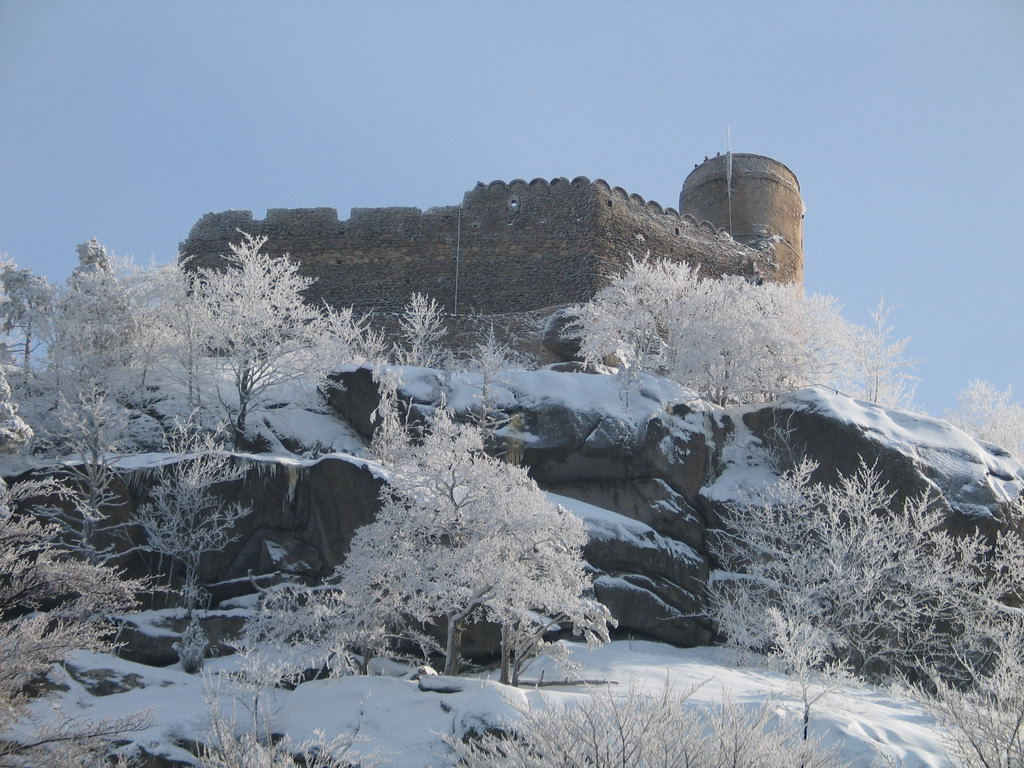
Kynast (Polish: Chojnik), built ca. 1292, Schaffgotsch family seat after 1360

Already in the 12th century the Polish kingdom built several strongholds against Bohemia near Jelenia Gora valley, such as Nowo Grodziec or Swiny. After Boleslaw I initiated the Ostsiedlung in Silesia, the valley was cleared of forests by German colonists beginning in the late 13th century, and several villages and towns were established, among them Hirschberg (Jelenia Góra). During that time the family Schaffgotsch appeared for the first time in the region, and later owned large parts of the valley as well as of the Giant Mountains until their expulsion in 1945. After the forests lost its significance as a natural border against Bohemia the Silesian Piasts of the independent duchy of Jawor-Świdnica built several castles in the valley to secure the border and to protect the new villages. Many fortifications were constructed, especially during the reign of Bolko II, who was in a constant feud with Bohemia. In the middle of the 15th century Matthias Corvinus, who ruled over Silesia, destroyed almost all Silesian castles. During the Renaissance and Baroque era many manors were expanded, sometimes to splendid palaces.

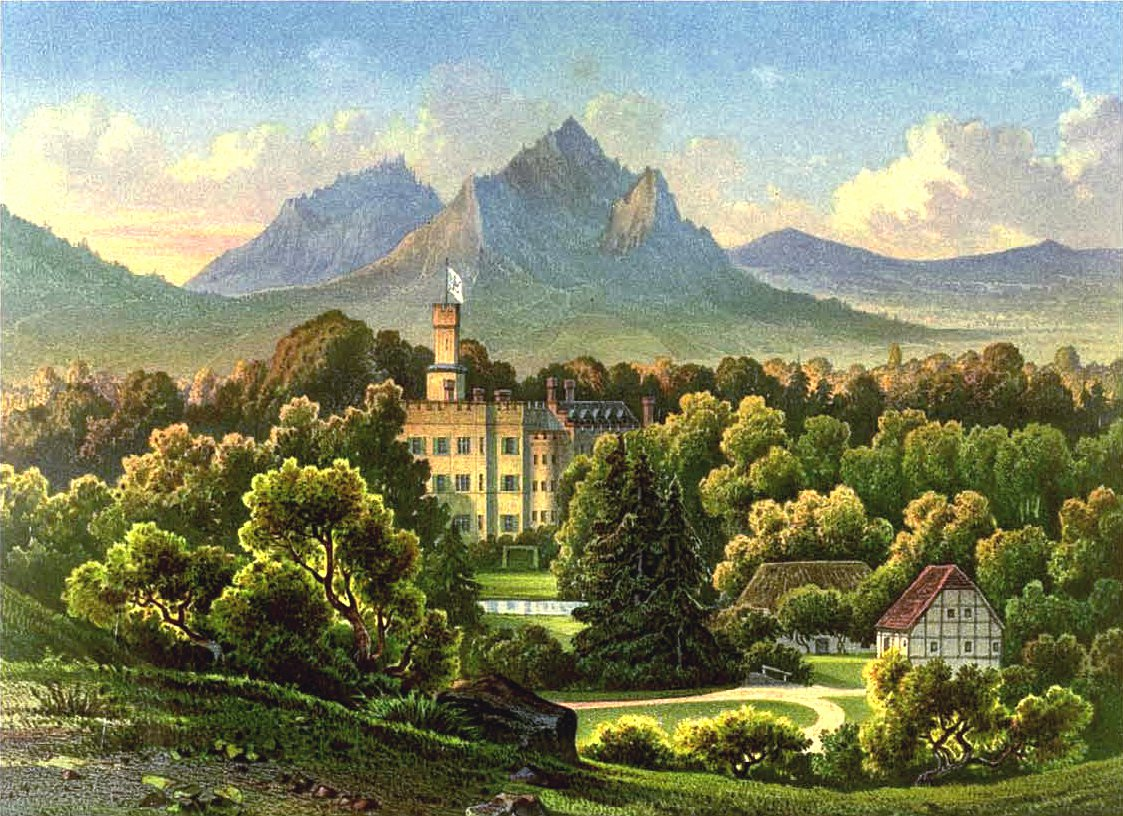
Fischbach Castle (Polish: Karpniki), summer residence of Prince Wilhelm of Prussia

Since the Treaty of Berlin (1742) Silesia had become part of the Kingdom of Prussia. At the end of the 18th century artists and travellers attracted by the landscape discovered the valley. At first Bad Warmbrunn (Cieplice Śląskie Zdrój, now a district of Jelenia Góra) with its hot springs became a popular bath and tourist centre. In 1822 Wilhelm, a brother of Prussian king Frederick William III, was the first prince of the Hohenzollern dynasty who took his summer residence in the Hirschberg valley, at Fischbach (today Karpniki) castle. In 1831 the king himself bought Erdmannsdorf estate, which he had learned to appreciate when visiting his brother in Fischbach and the previous owner of Erdmannsdorf, field marshal August von Gneisenau. The valley became a princely hideaway, and in 1839 the king purchased nearby Schildau Castle (today Wojanów) for his daughter Princess Louise. Frederick William IV enlarged Erdmannsdorf Palace. Many new parks were created and manors and palaces rebuilt according to the newest architectural styles. Artificial ruins, small pavilions, cottages, romantic temples and viewpoints created a cultural landscape of international recognition.

At the end of the 19th century Hirschberg valley became one of the most favoured travel destinations in Germany. Tourism by car became popular after new streets, like the Sudetenstraße (Sudete road), were built in the first half of the 20th century. Many new hotels were constructed in Hirschberg, Krummhübel (Polish: Karpacz) and Schreiberhau (Polish: Szklarska Poręba), which also housed an artists' colony, and Bad Warmbrunn was one of the most popular spas in Eastern Germany. Palaces and parks became a tourist attraction and many art collections were opened for the public.

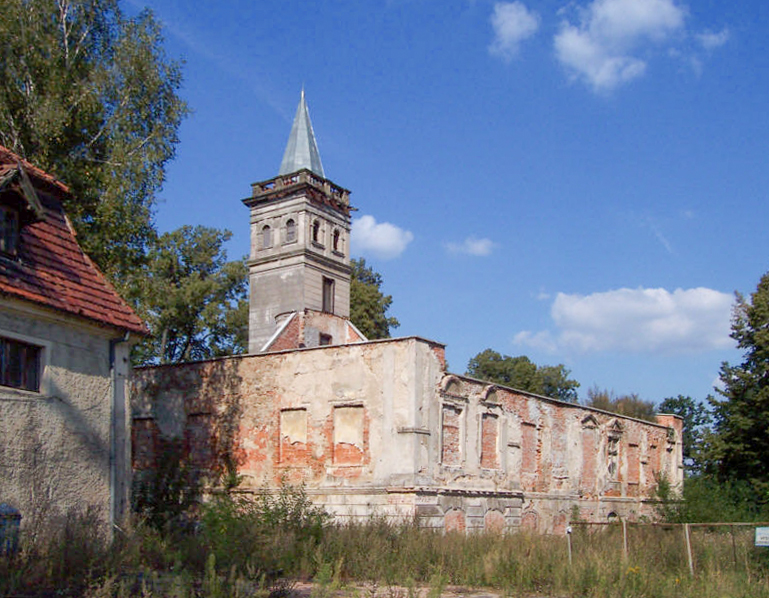
Barcinek palace (German: Berthelsdorf), neglected and ruinous since 1971

At the end of World War II Silesia was conquered by the Soviet Union and the valley became part of Poland. The new owners rarely maintained the cultural heritage. Important churches and the castles, testimonies of the early Polish culture before the German colonization in the 13th and 14th century, were preserved, palaces and manors however were neglected, vandalized and sometimes destroyed. Directly after the war the reactivation of tourism was tried, however as most holiday homes in the valley were occupied by new settlers and the touristic infrastructure was in a sorry state these attempts failed. The parks, the excellent hiking trail network and erstwhile viewpoints run to seed, while most of the art collections were either destroyed or dissolved and spread all over Poland.

After the collapse of communism in Poland a rediscovery of the cultural landscape began, which is increasingly accepted and appreciated by the descendants of the Polish settlers. Today many private and governmental initiatives, as well as German expellee organisations and family members of former owners, work together to revitalize the touristic infrastructure and cultural heritage, and academics work on the acceptance of the valley as a World Heritage Site.

== Parks ==
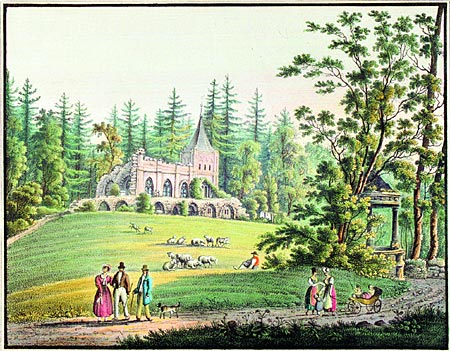
Park in Buchwald (Bukowiec),19th century, artificial ruin of abbey, decayed after 1945

Enthusiastic contemporaries described the Hirschberg valley of the 19th century as one "big English garden". Already at the end of the 18th century Hirschbergs director of town planning, Schönau, created several gardens on the surrounding hills of the city. Around 1800 the first parks emerged in Ruhberg (Polish: Ciszyca) and Stonsdorf (Polish: Staniszów). These early parks were affected by Sentimentalism, as the art of garden design was especially suitable to stimulate deep feelings like melancholy, teariness, amazement or joy.

In the course of the 19th century horticulture became more and more influenced by romantic ideas and a new historical awareness. Instead of different scenes and architectural styles more reduced designs, only consisting of mere scenic elements like trees, groves, creeks, meadows and hills, became popular. Extensive path networks and long view shafts were a central element of these parks. A prominent example was the park of Fischbach.

"It is what in England is commonly called an ornamented farm, and the grounds are out altogether in the English taste. Nature is indeed here so extremely beautiful of herself that she will condescend to receive very little decoration from human ingenuity. Here are lawns and grottoes and cascades and running streams and parks which scarcely require anything more than enclosure to make English gardens."

— John Quincy Adams describing the park of Buchwald

The landscape architecture in Hirschberg valley culminated during the 1840s with the work of Peter Joseph Lenné. New parks were created in Erdmannsdorf (Polish: Mysłakowice), Schildau (Polish: Wojanów) and Lomnitz (Polish: Łomnica). These parks followed the so-called zoned landscape garden, a principle which was adopted by Lenné and Pückler-Muskau from England. It was marked by richly decorated gardens around the house which were divided into small sections, followed by a pleasure ground as a transition zone and a landscape garden which faded into the proximity. The surrounding countryside was landscaped by Lenné with alleys, paths, lookout points and places to rest.

The large number of parks from different eras, the artistic reference of all these parks to the beautified surrounding countryside and the picturesque backdrop of the Giant Mountains created a unique landscape, which was regarded as a Silesian Elysium. Since a few years, the Polish conservation organization tries to preserve and recreate the cultural landscape, which slowly recovers its lost beauty.

== Sights ==
Jelenia Góra valley is the natural foreland of the Karkonosze Mountains. Many places in the valley offer unparalleled views of the mountains. An outstanding feature of the valley is the large number of country seats and locks, for example Mysłakowice, Staniszów and now to Jelenia Góra or Cieplice Śląskie-Zdrój with park and spa. Chojnik, a castle ruin on a foothill of the Karkonosze (Giant) Mountains, overlooks the entire Jelenia Góra valley. A lake district in the south of the Wzgórza Łomnickie at the foot of the mountains, created in the 1980s and 1990s, represents another distinctive feature. It consists of a series of dams, of which Zbiornik Sosnówka or Jezioro Sosnówka below Sosnówka and Podgórzyn, with a dam of 1.5 kilometres in length, 20 metres in height and an area of 170 hectares, is the largest.

== Important castles, palaces and manors ==
For a complete list see List of castles and palaces in Jelenia Góra valley

=== Wojanów palace ===
Wojanów palace (German: Schloss Schildau), was one of three former royal Prussian summer residences in the valley. It was first mentioned in 1281. Since 1299 it was owned by family von Zedlitz. Between 1603 and 1607 Nikolaus Freiherr von Zedlitz und Nimmersatt erected a new building, which was destroyed during the Thirty Years' War and rebuilt in 1667 by Christoph von Zedlitz. Between 1832 and 1833 the interior of the palace was altered by a builder close to Karl Friedrich Schinkel. In 1839 Frederick William III of Prussia bought the building as a gift for his daughter Louise. In the following years, the park was newly designed by Peter Joseph Lenné. After World War II the palace was looted and the furniture removed. The new Polish owners used it as an administrative building and holiday home. Later it was abandoned and fell into ruin. In 1995 a Polish-Italian company restored the building and its surroundings, which now house a luxurious hotel, spa and a business centre. The park has been restored to its formal glory (Wojanów Palace home page).

=== Mysłakowice palace ===
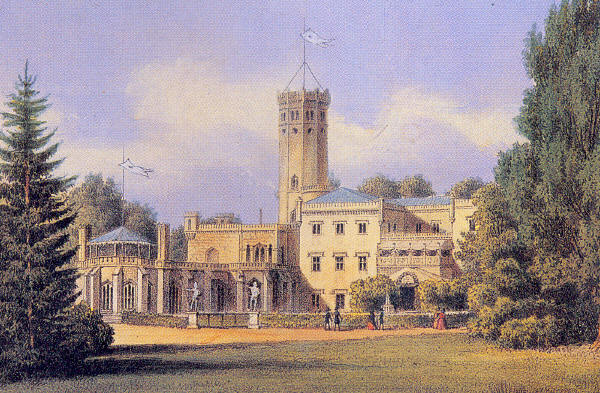
Mysłakowice Palace in the 19th century

Mysłakowice palace (German: Schloss Erdmannsdorf) was the summer residence of the Prussian king and the most important palace in the valley. It was mentioned for the first time in 1305. Until the 16th century it was owned by the families of Zedlitz, Stange and Reibnitz. The core of today's building emanated from the 18th century, when Maximilian Leopold von Reibnitz expanded it to a Baroque palace. Later it was, among others, owned by the family von Richthofen and August Neidhardt von Gneisenau. Gneisenau expanded it in neo-classical style. After his death Frederick William III of Prussia bought the palace and appointed Schinkel and Lenné to remodel palace and the park, which became one of the most beautiful landscape gardens in Silesia. In 1837 Frederick William III left large parts of his estate to religious refugees from Tyrol, who built picturesque Alpine-style houses. After Frederick Williams death his successor, Frederick William IV of Prussia, reconvert the palace to plans by Friedrich August Stüler in neo-Gothic style. Until 1909 the stately home continued to be the summer residence of the Prussians kings and German emperors, afterwards it was sold for 1,7 million Mark.

After World War II the Communist Red Army occupied the palace. Since 1951 the Polish state used it as a school and largely destroyed the interior. Today parts of the exterior are renovated and most of the park is preserved, even though some important view shafts are overgrown.

=== Karpniki palace ===
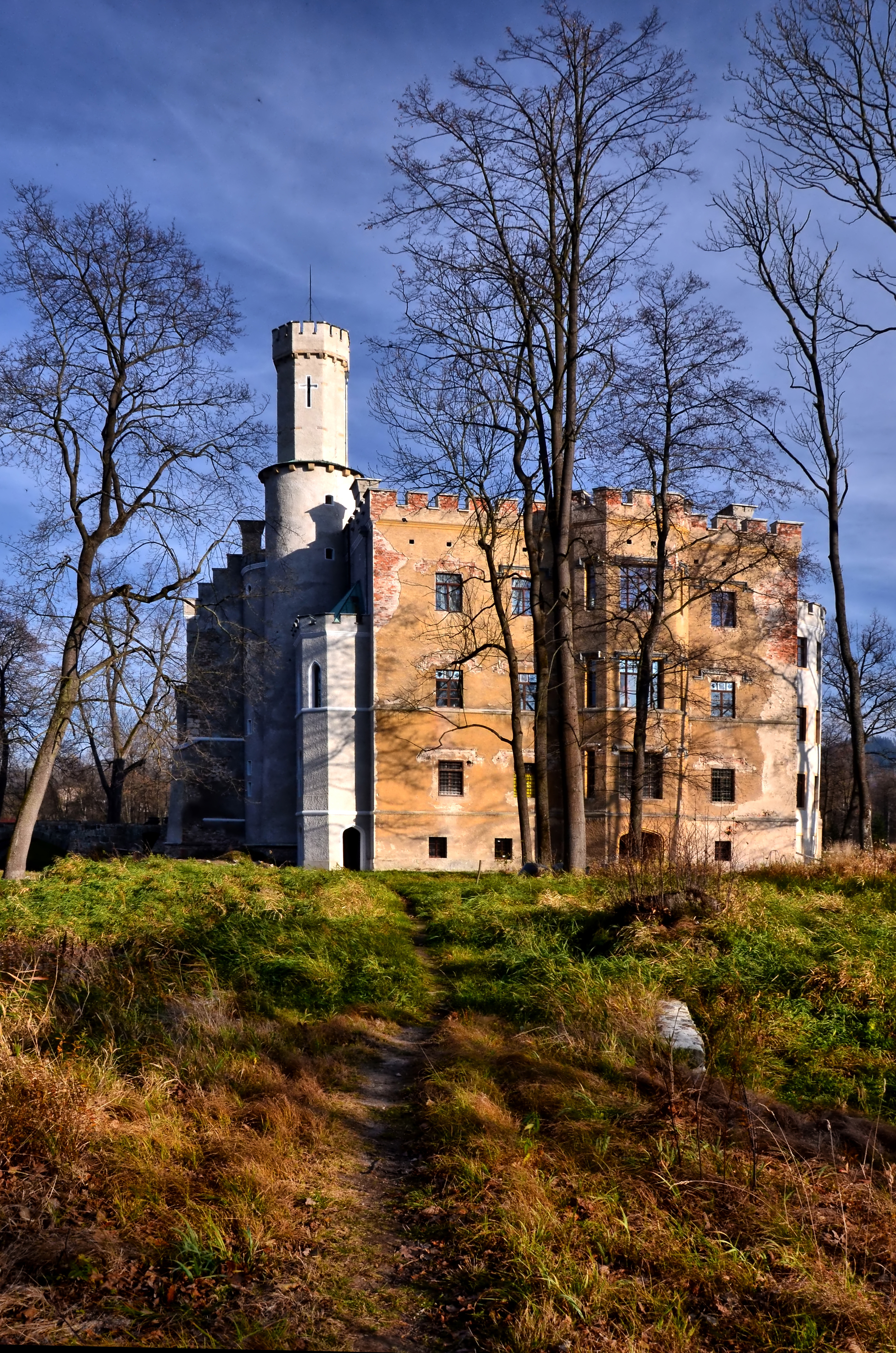
Karpniki palace today

Karpniki palace (German: Schloss Fischbach), the summer palace of Prince Wilhelm of Prussia, is one of the best-known palaces in the valley. It was first mentioned in 1364 as a moated castle, which was expanded in the 15th century. Initially owned by the families Predel and Reichenbach, it was bought by Hans I. Schoff in 1476, who enlarged the castle with a two-storied mansion. After a fire in 1593, the building was again expanded with two new wings in Renaissance style. In 1822 prince Wilhelm acquired Fischbach, which became the first summer palace of the Hohenzollern dynasty in the valley. Beginning from 1844 it was reconstructed in neo-Gothic style according to plans in part by the prince himself. Wilhelm and his successors also equipped the palace with a remarkable art collection of medieval glass paintings and far eastern objects of art. At the end of World War II, it was used as a depository for important art treasures from Silesia and the national library in Berlin.

After the war, Russian and Polish soldiers plundered Karpniki, which became part of Poland. In the following years, the palace was used as a school and a mental hospital. Over time it fell into disrepair and had to be evacuated. In the following years, it was several times depredated and also willfully destroyed. After the fall of the Iron Curtain several initiatives tried to hold up the decline, until now however without success.

The large estate park was created after 1822 to instructions of princess Marianne. The arrangement referred to the family of the owners. A bench of marble showed medallions of the prince, the princess and its children, a neo-Gothic monument commemorated to a brother of princess Marianne and the Waldemarsturm housed a weapons collection of Prince Waldemar. But also cottages, a greenhouse, a cross on the summit by Christian Daniel Rauch and many other buildings and structures were erected. Today the park is barely visible and most of its buildings are destroyed.

=== Bolcz Castle ===
Bolcz Castle was established in 1375. It has had a succession of owners and alterations and was briefly a hotel after WW2.

=== Bukowiec palace ===
Bukowiec palace (German: Buchwald) – formerly Countess von Reden, now academy, with park and Belvedere

=== Cieplice Śląskie-Zdrój palace ===
Cieplice Śląskie-Zdrój palace (German: Bad Warmbrunn) – palace Count of Schaffgotsch

== Literature ==
- Szarek, Bohdan (1997). Kotlina Jeleniogórska. Wydawnictwo PTTK "Kraj". ISBN 83-7005-366-1.
- Franke, Arne (2005). Das schlesische Elysium – Burgen, Schlösser, Herrenhäuser und Parks im Hirschberger Tal. Potsdam: Deutsches Kulturforum östliches Europa e.V. ISBN 978-3-936168-33-4.
