= Głębock =

Głębock may refer to the following places in Poland:

- Głębock, Lower Silesian Voivodeship (south-west Poland)
- Głębock, Warmian-Masurian Voivodeship (north Poland)
