= WILM =

Wilm or WILM may refer to:

== Radio stations ==
- WILM (AM), a radio station (1450 AM) in Wilmington, Delaware, United States
- WILM-LD, a low-powered television station (channel 15, virtual 10) licensed to serve Wilmington, North Carolina, United States

== People ==
- Alfred Wilm (1869–1937), German metallurgist
- Clarke Wilm (born 1976), Canadian ice hockey player
- Eike Wilm Schulte (1939–2925), German operatic baritone
