= Gmina Podgórzyn =

Gmina Podgórzyn Podgórzyn Commune
- Gmina
- Coat of arms
- Interactive map of Gmina Podgórzyn
- Coordinates (Podgórzyn): 50°49′57″N 15°41′1″E
- Country: Poland
- Voivodeship: Lower Silesian
- County: Karkonosze
- Seat: Podgórzyn
- Sołectwos: Borowice, Głębock, Marczyce, Miłków, Podgórzyn, Przesieka, Ściegny, Sosnówka, Staniszów, Zachełmie

Area
  - Total: 82.47 km^{2} (31.84 sq mi)

Population (2019-06-30)
  - Total: 8,260
  - Density: 100/km^{2} (259/sq mi)
- Website: http://www.podgorzyn.pl

Gmina Podgórzyn is a rural gmina (administrative district) in Karkonosze County, Lower Silesian Voivodeship, in south-western Poland. Its seat is the village of Podgórzyn, approximately 9 kilometres (6 mi) south-west of Jelenia Góra and 101 km (63 mi) west of the regional capital Wrocław.

The gmina covers an area of 82.47 square kilometres (31.84 sq mi), and as of 2019 its total population was s 8,260.

== Neighbouring gminas ==
Gmina Podgórzyn is bordered by the towns of Jelenia Góra, Karpacz, Kowary and Piechowice and the gmina of Mysłakowice. It also borders the Czech Republic.

== Villages ==
The gmina contains the villages of Borowice, Głębock, Marczyce, Miłków, Podgórzyn, Przesieka, Ściegny, Sosnówka, Staniszów and Zachełmie.

== Twin towns – sister cities ==
Gmina Podgórzyn is twinned with:

- Desná, Czech Republic
- Górzyca, Poland
- Schirgiswalde-Kirschau, Germany
- Smołdzino, Poland
- Špindlerův Mlýn, Czech Republic
