= Alfred Wilm =

German metallurgist (1869–1937)

Alfred Wilm (25 June 1869 – 6 August 1937) was a German metallurgist who invented the alloy Al-(3.5%-5.5%)Cu-Mg-Mn, now known as Duralumin which is used extensively in aircraft.

== Research Work ==
Whilst working in private military-industrial laboratory Zentralstelle für wissenschaftlich-technische Untersuchungen (Center for Scientific-Technical Research) in Neubabelsberg in 1901, Wilm discovered age hardening, in particular age hardening of aluminium alloys. This discovery was made after hardness measurements on Al-Cu alloy specimens were serendipitously found to increase in hardness at room temperature. This increase in hardness was identified after his measurements were interrupted by a weekend, and when they were resumed on the Monday the hardness had increased.

By 1906, Wilm had developed an alloy – Al-(3.5–5.5%)Cu-Mg-Mn (Mg and Mn were < 1%), for which a patent was filed. Later this patent was purchased and the alloy marketed as Duralumin. Somewhat unusually, Wilm did not write his first article on age hardening until 1911.

== Death ==
At the time Wilm was developing an aluminium alloy to replace brass in ammunition. The patent on Duralumin was ignored and breached by many firms, and he struggled without success to protect his rights under it. In 1919, Wilm retired from research and became a farmer. He died at his farm in Saalberg on 6 August 1937.
