= Marczyce =

- Village
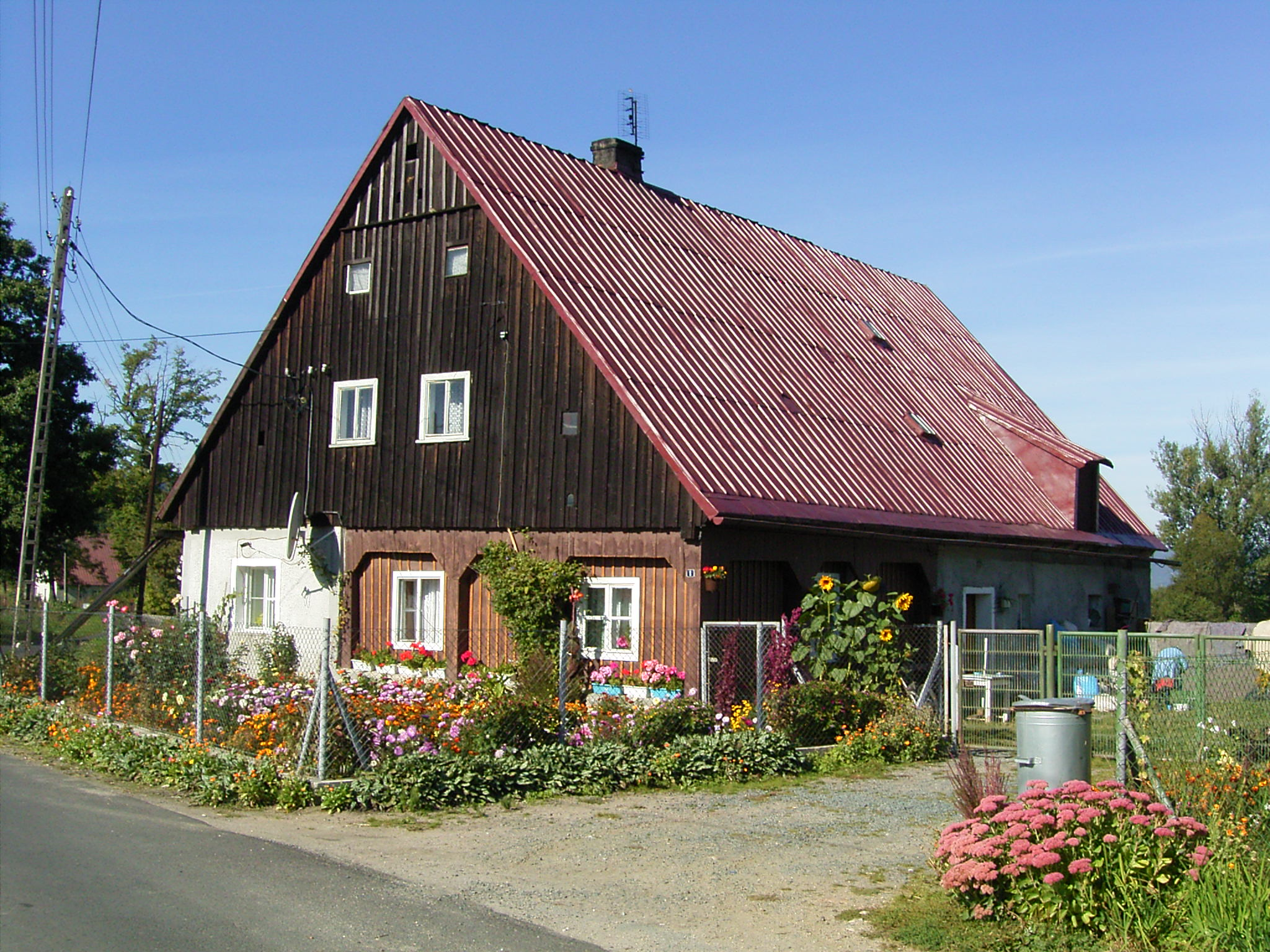
- Umgebindehaus in Marczyce

- Location within Poland
- Coordinates: 50°50′N 15°43′E
- Country: Poland
- Voivodeship: Lower Silesian
- Powiat: Karkonosze
- Gmina: Podgórzyn

Marczyce [marˈt͡ʂɨt͡sɛ] (German: Märzdorf) is a village in the administrative district of Gmina Podgórzyn, within Karkonosze County, Lower Silesian Voivodeship, in south-western Poland.
