= Borowice, Lower Silesian Voivodeship =

Borowice
- Village
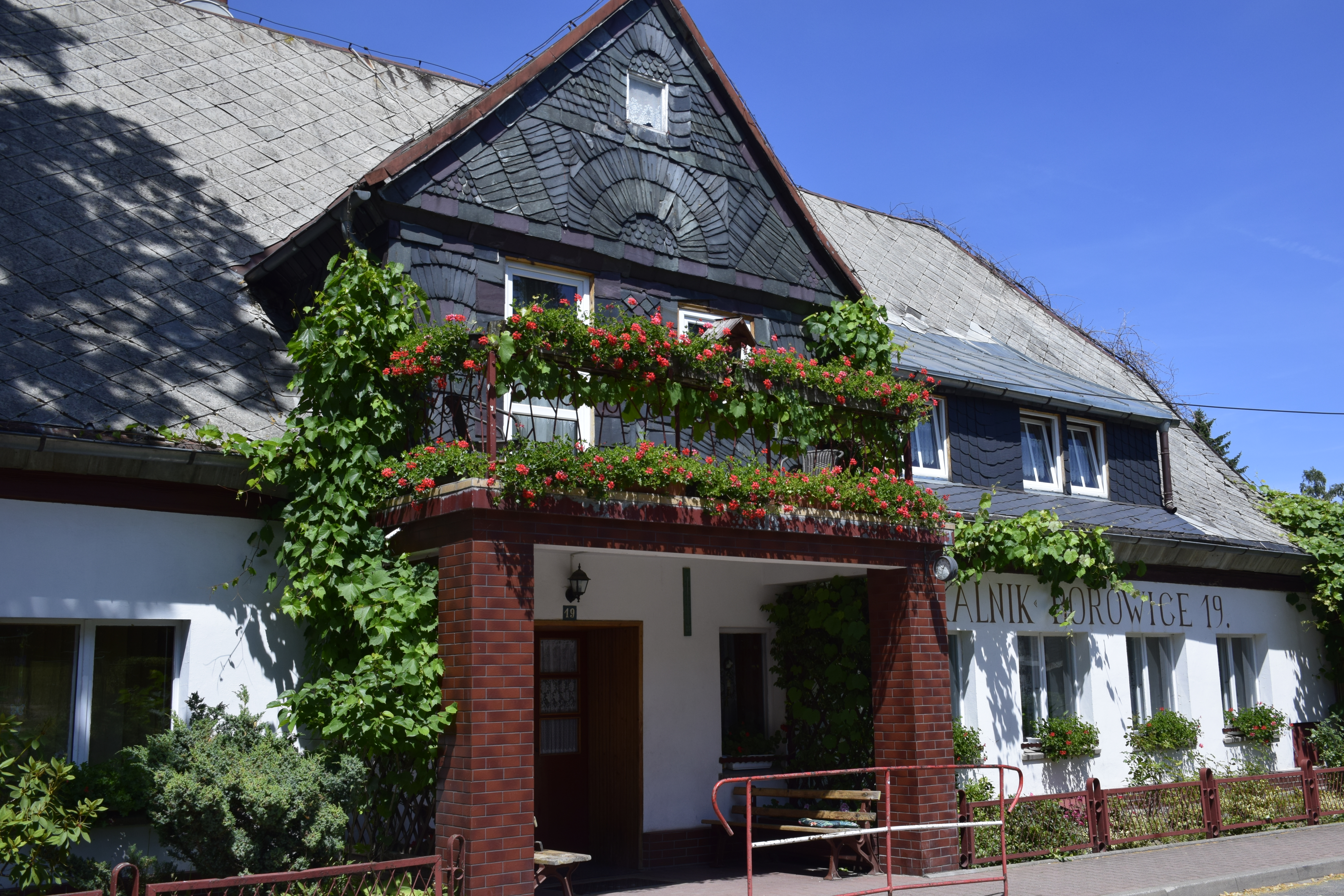
- Building in the village

- Location within Poland
- Coordinates: 50°47′21″N 15°41′42″E
- Country: Poland
- Voivodeship: Lower Silesian
- Powiat: Karkonosze
- Gmina: Podgórzyn
- Founded: 1644
- Time zone: UTC+1 (CET)
  - Summer (DST): UTC+2 (CEST)
- Vehicle registration: DJE

Borowice [bɔrɔˈvit͡sɛ] (German: Baberhäuser) is a village in the administrative district of Gmina Podgórzyn, within Karkonosze County, Lower Silesian Voivodeship, in south-western Poland.

== History ==
The area became part of the emerging Polish state in the 10th century. Initially it was administratively part of the Wleń castellany. The village was founded in 1644 by Swiss carpenter Martin Markensteiner, who fled from Bohemia during the Thirty Years' War.

During World War II, in 1940–1942, the Germans used Belgian, French and Soviet prisoners of war and possibly also Czech and Polish civilians for forced labour to build a road connecting the village with Przełęcz Karkonoska, now known as Droga Borowicka ("Borowice Road"), however, the construction was not completed.

== Gallery ==
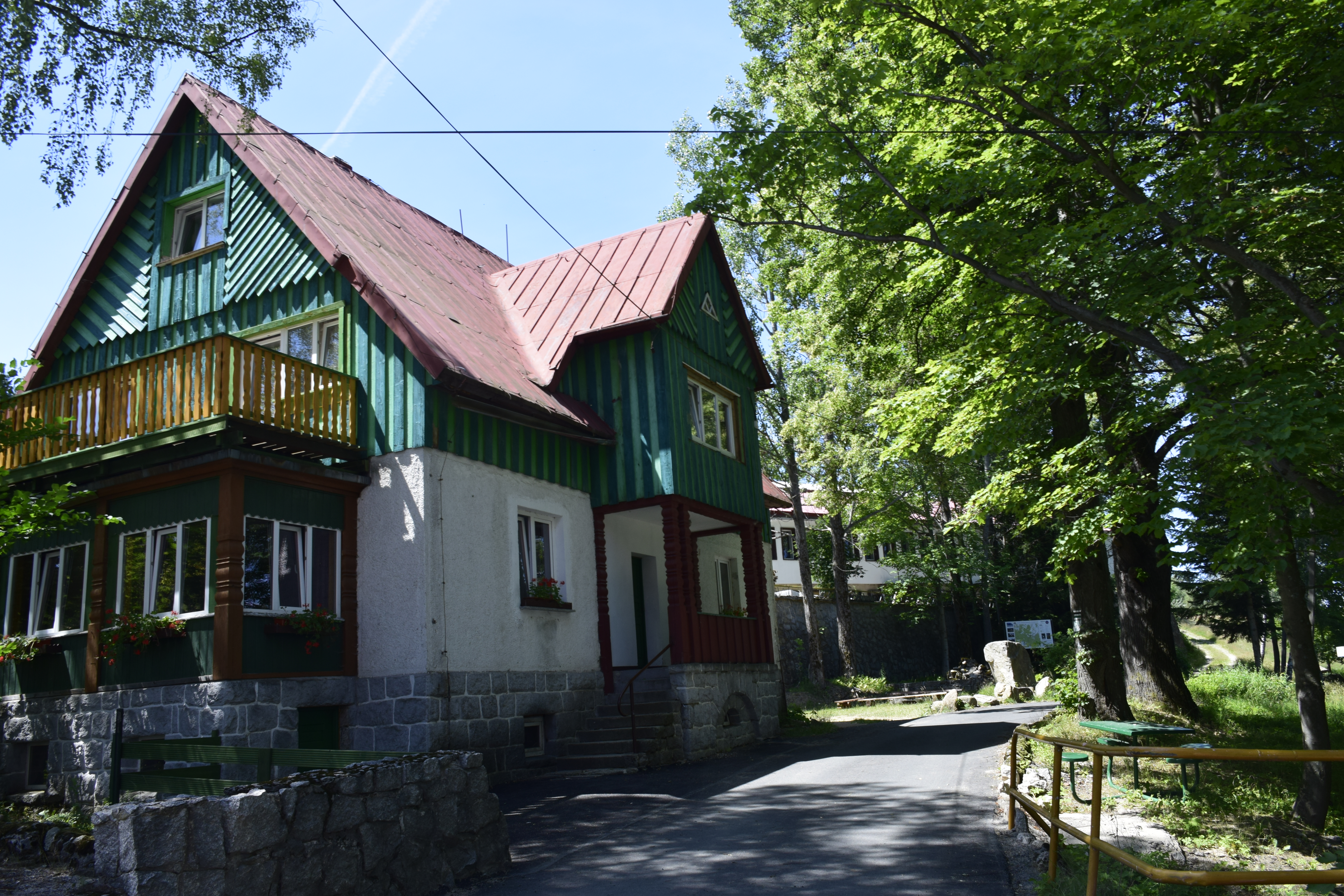
Wooden house

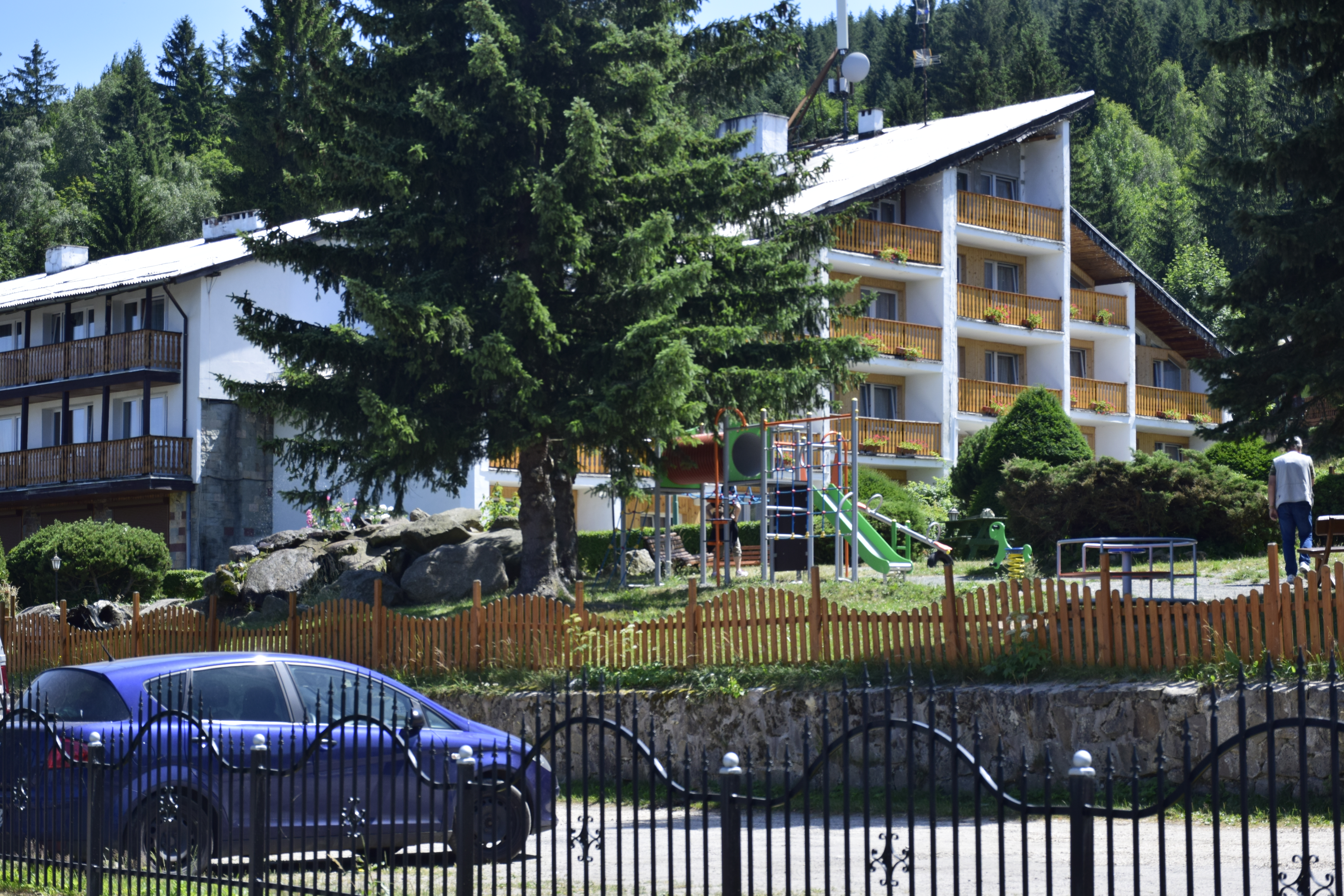
Hotel

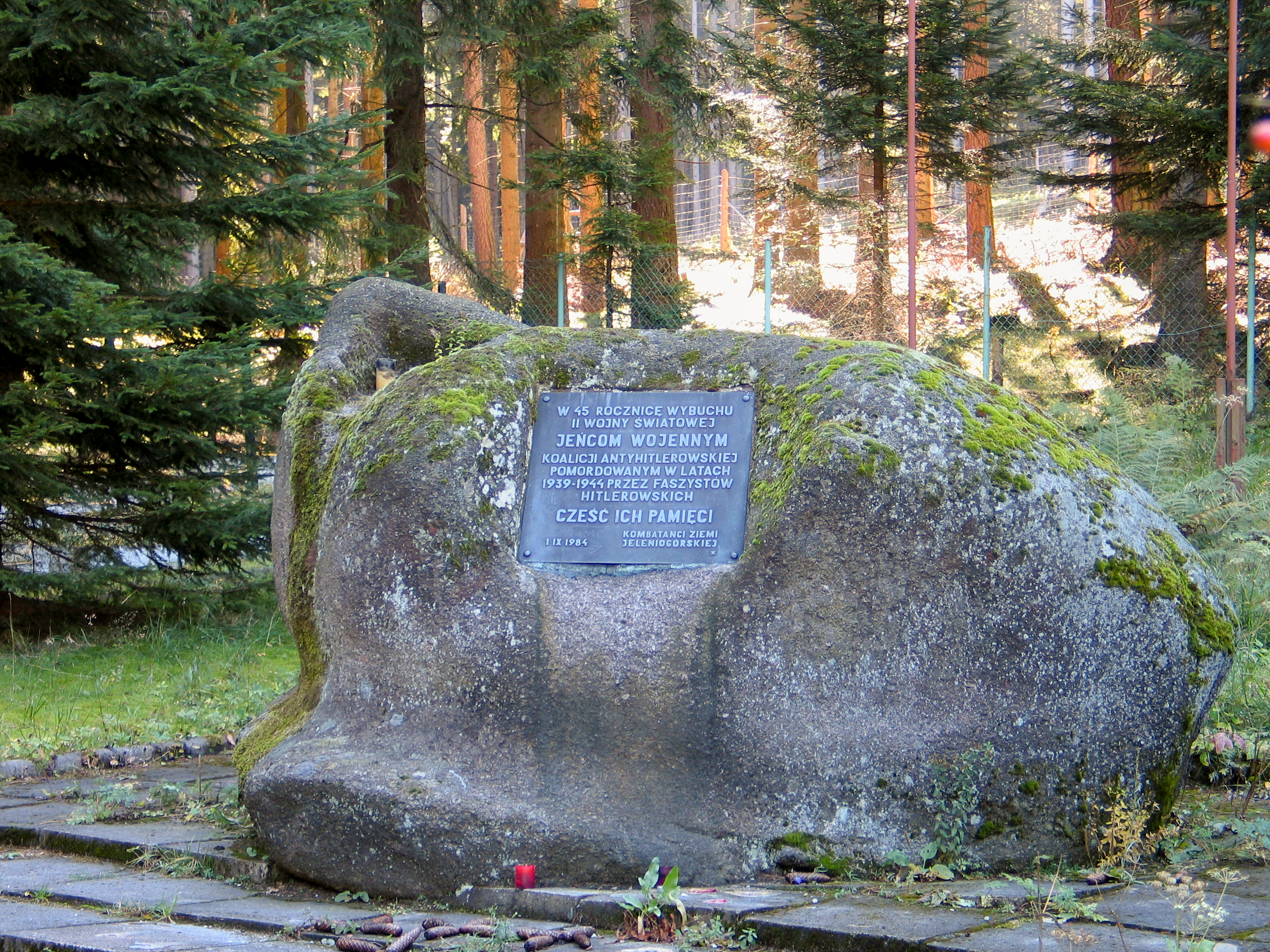
Memorial to Allied POWs murdered by Nazi Germany in WWII
