= Miłków, Lower Silesian Voivodeship =

Miłków
- Village
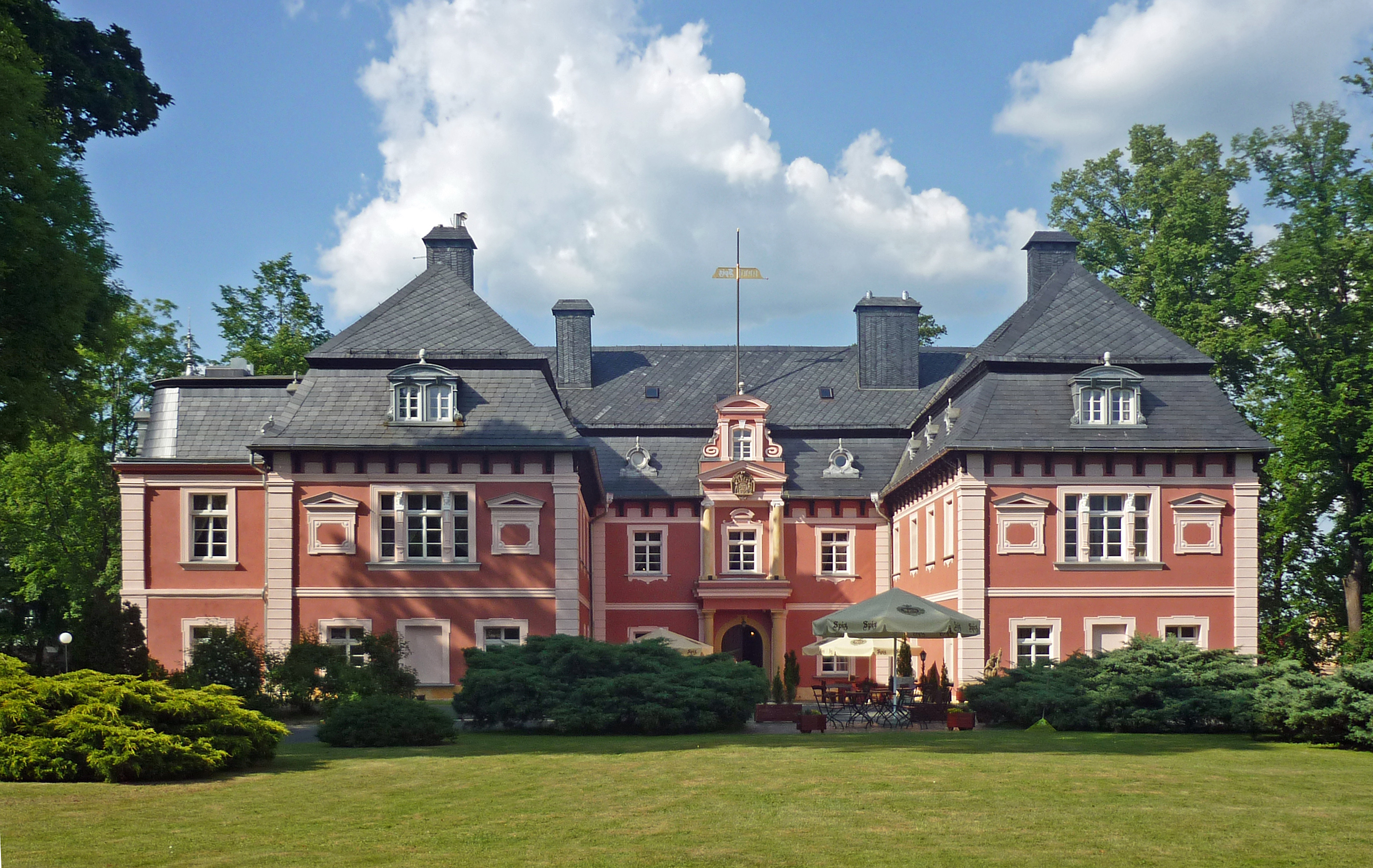
- Miłków Palace

- Location within Poland
- Coordinates: 50°48′35″N 15°45′40″E
- Country: Poland
- Voivodeship: Lower Silesian
- County: Karkonosze
- Gmina: Podgórzyn
- First mentioned: 1305
- Time zone: UTC+1 (CET)
  - Summer (DST): UTC+2 (CEST)
- Vehicle registration: DJE

Miłków [ˈmiu̯kuf] (German: Arnsdorf) is a village in the administrative district of Gmina Podgórzyn, within Karkonosze County, Lower Silesian Voivodeship, in south-western Poland.

== History ==
The area became part of the emerging Polish state in the 10th century. Initially it was administratively part of the Wleń castellany. The village was first mentioned in a document of the Wrocław cathedral chapter from 1305, when it was part of fragmented Piast-ruled Poland.

With the advent of tourism, local Polish mountain guide Jan Gruszczewski was active already in the early 19th century.

== Sights ==
Miłków is the location of the ten-sided concrete structure known as the Muchołapka, ("Flytrap") built at the Dynamit Nobel plant during World War II. The structure, also known as The Henge, is associated with the Die Glocke urban myth.

Cultural heritage sights of Miłków are the Miłków Palace and Park complex and the Church of Saint Hedwig.
