= Przesieka, Lower Silesian Voivodeship =

Przesieka
- Village
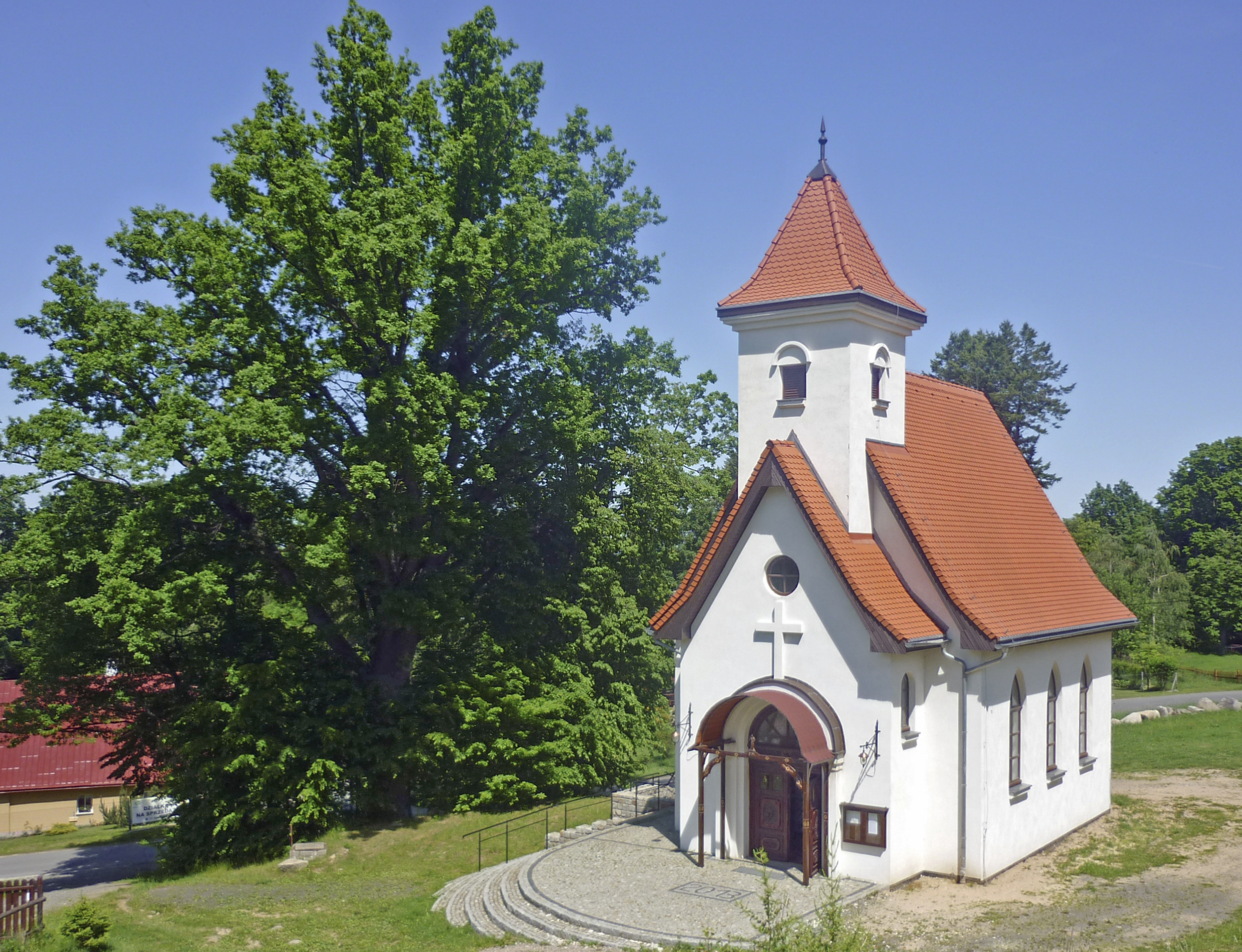
- Chapel in the village

- Location within Poland
- Coordinates: 50°48′30″N 15°40′20″E
- Country: Poland
- Voivodeship: Lower Silesian
- Powiat: Karkonosze
- Gmina: Podgórzyn
- Time zone: UTC+1 (CET)
  - Summer (DST): UTC+2 (CEST)
- Postal code: 58-563
- Vehicle registration: DJE
- Website: https://www.przesieka.pl/dzis.html

Przesieka [pʂɛˈɕɛka] (German: Hain) is a village in Lower Silesia, southwestern Poland. It belongs to Lower Silesian Voivodeship, in Karkonosze County, Gmina Podgórzyn. It is one of the most important centres of mountain hiking.

It is 15 minutes drive from the centre of Jelenia Góra (5 minutes drive from Cieplice Spa). There is a regular city bus going to Przesieka from Jelenia Góra central train station. Several hiking routes to Karkonosze Mountains begin in Przesieka. One of the most widely used is a route (2 h walk) to Przełęcz Karkonoska. Other popular routes lead to Chojnik Castle (1 hour walk), and Karpacz (1.5 h walk). An interesting place to visit in Przesieka is Podgórna Waterfall (547 m above sea level).

== History ==
The area became part of the emerging Polish state in the 10th century. Initially it was administratively part of the Wleń castellany. Since the Late Middle Ages, it passed successively to the Bohemian Crown lands, later the Habsburg Monarchy and, from 1742, the Kingdom of Prussia and, from 1871, the German Empire, within which it was known by its German name Hain.

During World War II, from 1940, Nazi Germany operated a forced labour camp for Belgian, French and Soviet prisoners of war in the village. The POWs were used to build a road towards the Przełęcz Karkonoska, now known as Droga Borowicka ("Borowice Road"). Poor sanitary and feeding conditions resulted in a high mortality rate, and by early 1942, a typhus epidemic broke out in the camp, and in March 1942, the camp was dissolved and the construction was halted.

After the Second World War the place was briefly renamed Matejkowice, before the name Przesieka was confirmed. In 1945, the Polish Dolnośląskie Towarzystwo Turystyczno-Krajoznawcze ("Lower Silesian Tourist and Sightseeing Society") was founded in the village, which was merged with the Polish Tourist and Sightseeing Society the following year.
