= Sosnówka, Karkonosze County =

Sosnówka
- Village
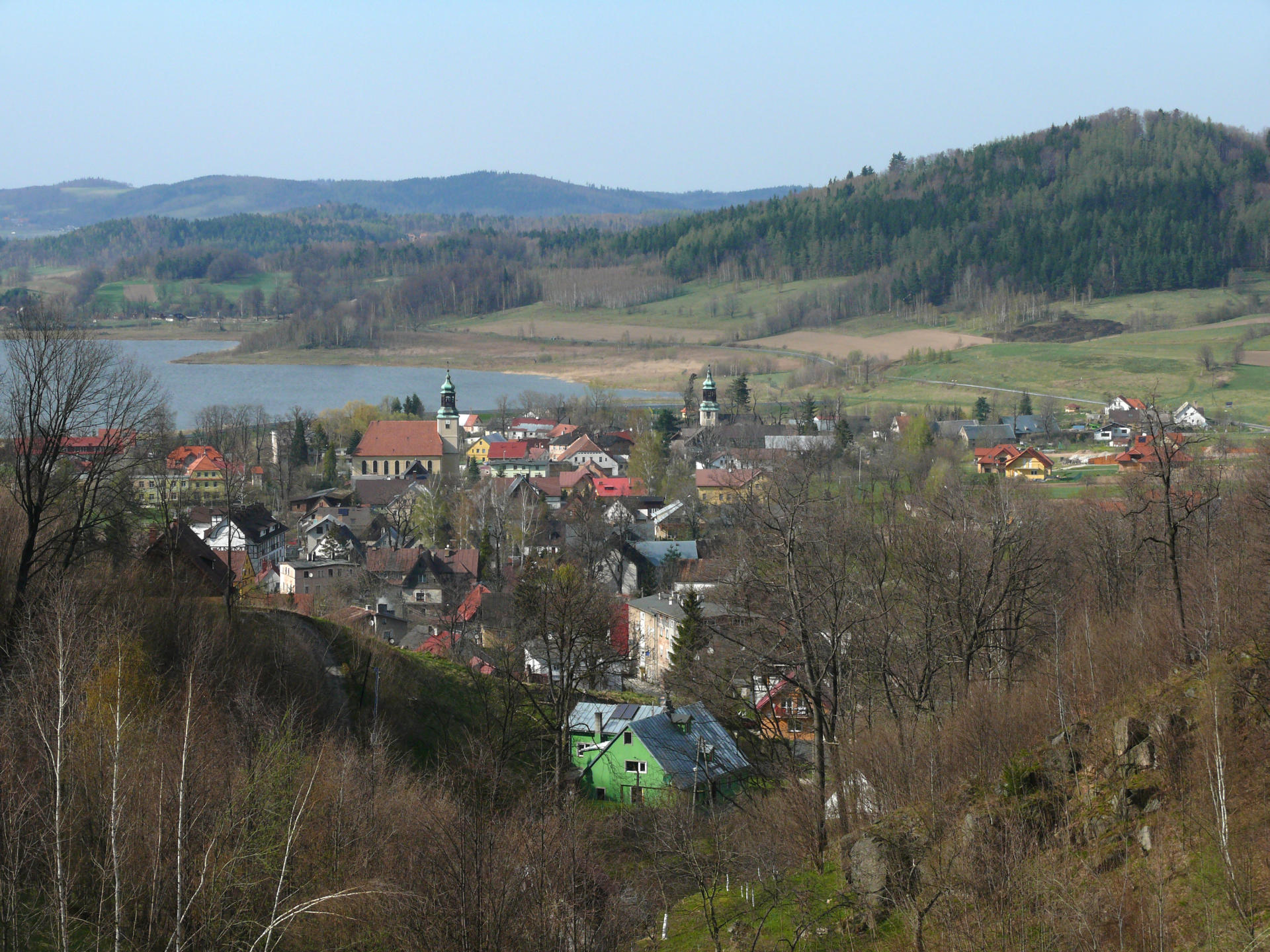
- Sosnówka

- Location within Poland
- Coordinates: 50°49′18″N 15°43′13″E
- Country: Poland
- Voivodeship: Lower Silesian
- County: Karkonosze
- Gmina: Podgórzyn
- First mentioned: 1318

Population
  - Total: 1,200
- Time zone: UTC+1 (CET)
  - Summer (DST): UTC+2 (CEST)
- Vehicle registration: DJE

Sosnówka [sɔsˈnufka] (German: Seidorf) is a village in the administrative district of Gmina Podgórzyn, within Karkonosze County, Lower Silesian Voivodeship, in south-western Poland.

The Sosnówka reservoir is located in Sosnówka.

== History ==
The area became part of the emerging Polish state in the 10th century. Initially it was administratively part of the Wleń castellany. The village was first mentioned in 1318, when it was part of fragmented Piast-ruled Poland.

With the advent of tourism, local Polish mountain guide Jerzy Suchodolski was active already in the 18th century.

== Sights ==
Cultural heritage sights of Sosnówka include the Baroque Saint Martin church and the Saint Anne chapel.
