= Sosnówka (lake) =

Sosnówka Lake
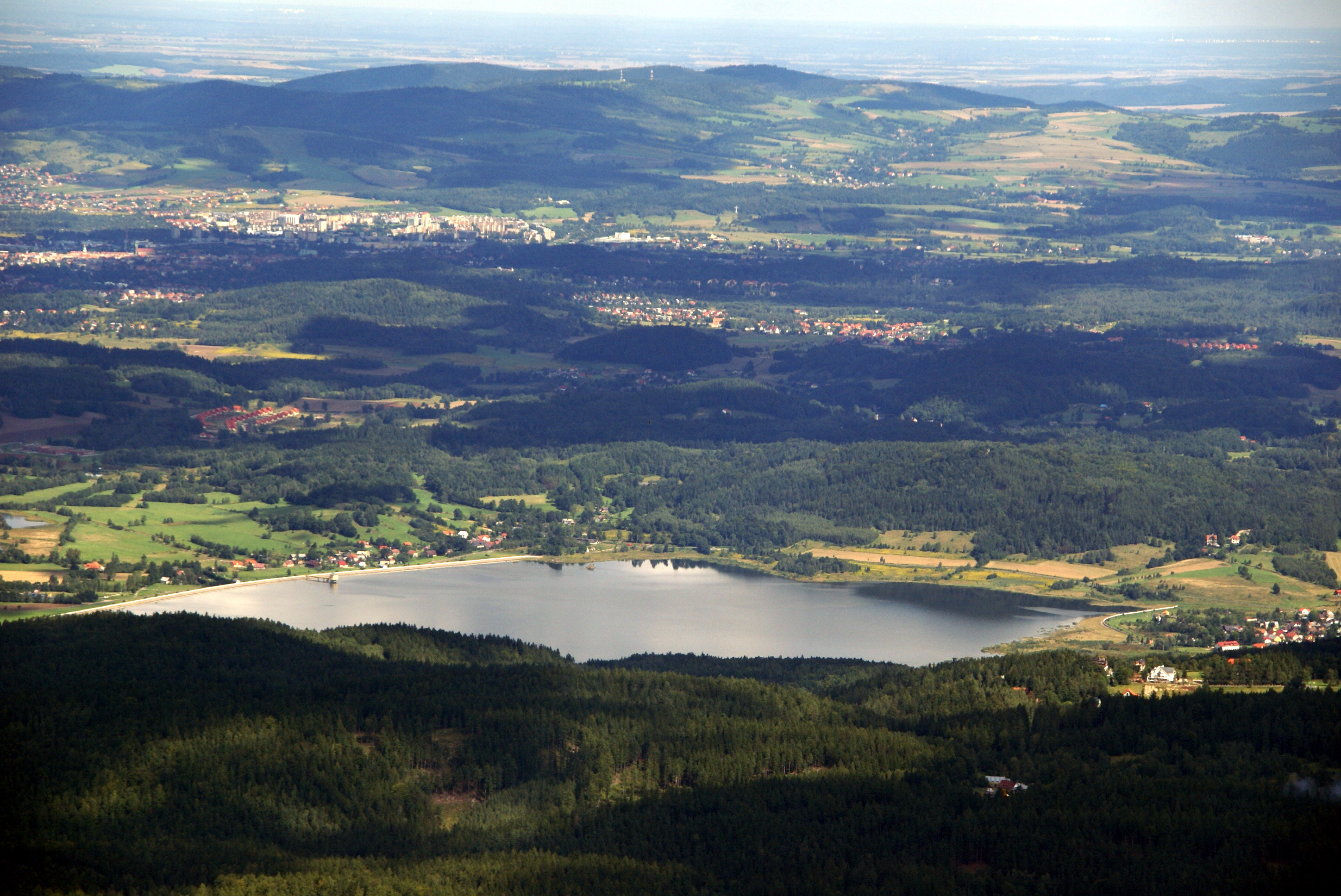
- Sosnówka Lake

- Location within Lower Silesian Voivodeship
- Coordinates: 50°49′52″N 15°42′08″E
- Type: lake
- Primary inflows: Podgórna, Sośniak, Czerwonka
- Basin countries: Poland
- Surface area: 1.70 km^{2} (0.66 sq mi)
- Water volume: 14×10^{6} m^{3} (11,000 acre⋅ft)

Sosnówka Lake is a retention reservoir and reservoir for drinking water located in the southern part of the Jelenia Góra Valley, Lower Silesian Voivodeship; in Poland. The reservoir has been in use since 2001.
