= Ścięgny =

- Village
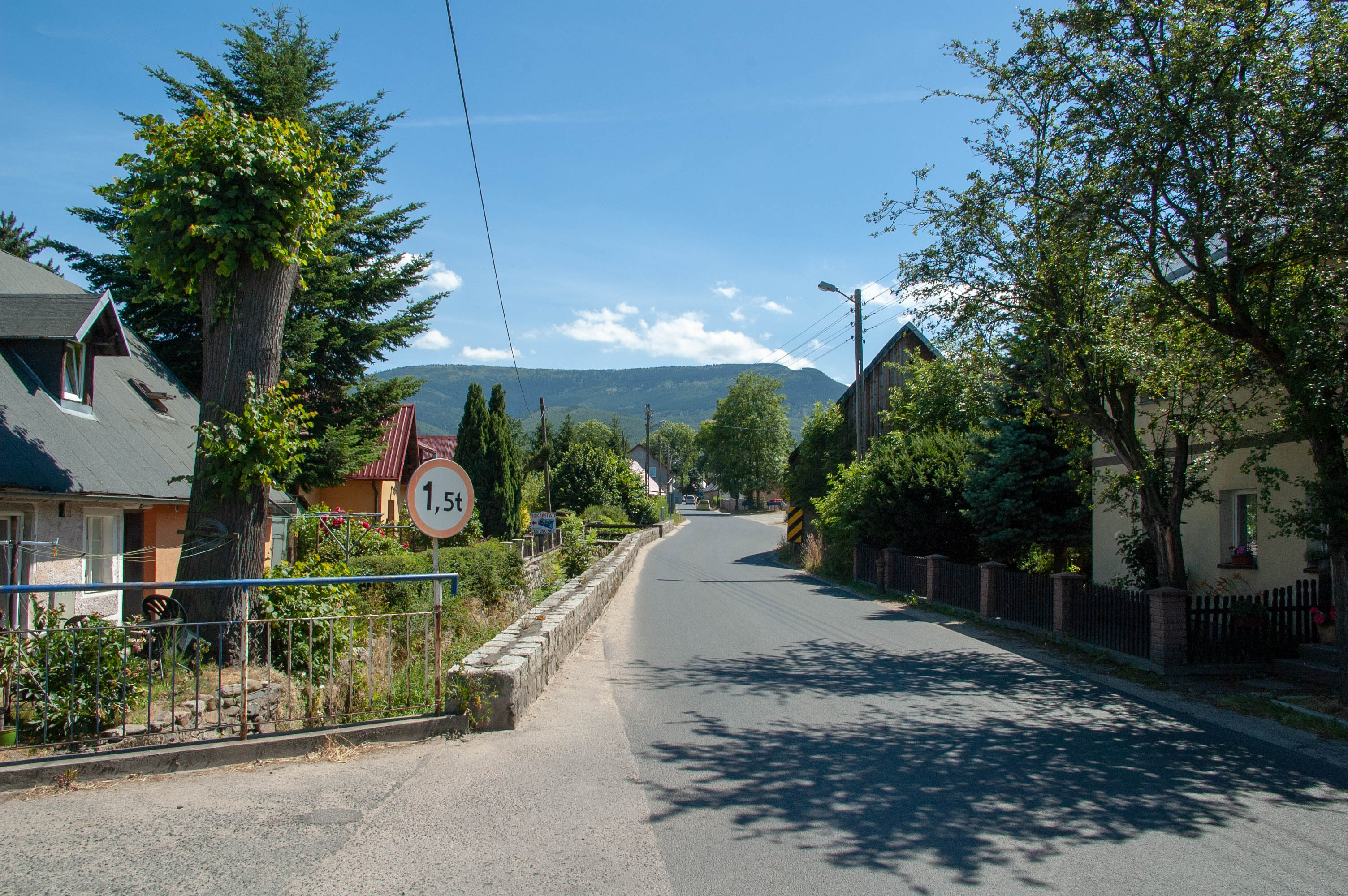

- Location within Poland
- Coordinates: 50°47′33″N 15°46′18″E
- Country: Poland
- Voivodeship: Lower Silesian
- Powiat: Karkonosze
- Gmina: Podgórzyn
- First mentioned: 1305
- Time zone: UTC+1 (CET)
  - Summer (DST): UTC+2 (CEST)
- Vehicle registration: DJE

Ścięgny [ˈɕt͡ɕɛɡnɨ] (German: Steinseiffen) is a village in the administrative district of Gmina Podgórzyn, within Karkonosze County, Lower Silesian Voivodeship, in south-western Poland.

The village was first mentioned in a document of the Wrocław cathedral chapter from 1305, when it was part of fragmented Piast-ruled Poland.

There is a memorial to Wacław Koler, 16th-century philologist and physician, one of the pioneers of Polish Hellenic studies and one of Poland's first numismatists, who was born in the village.

== Gallery ==
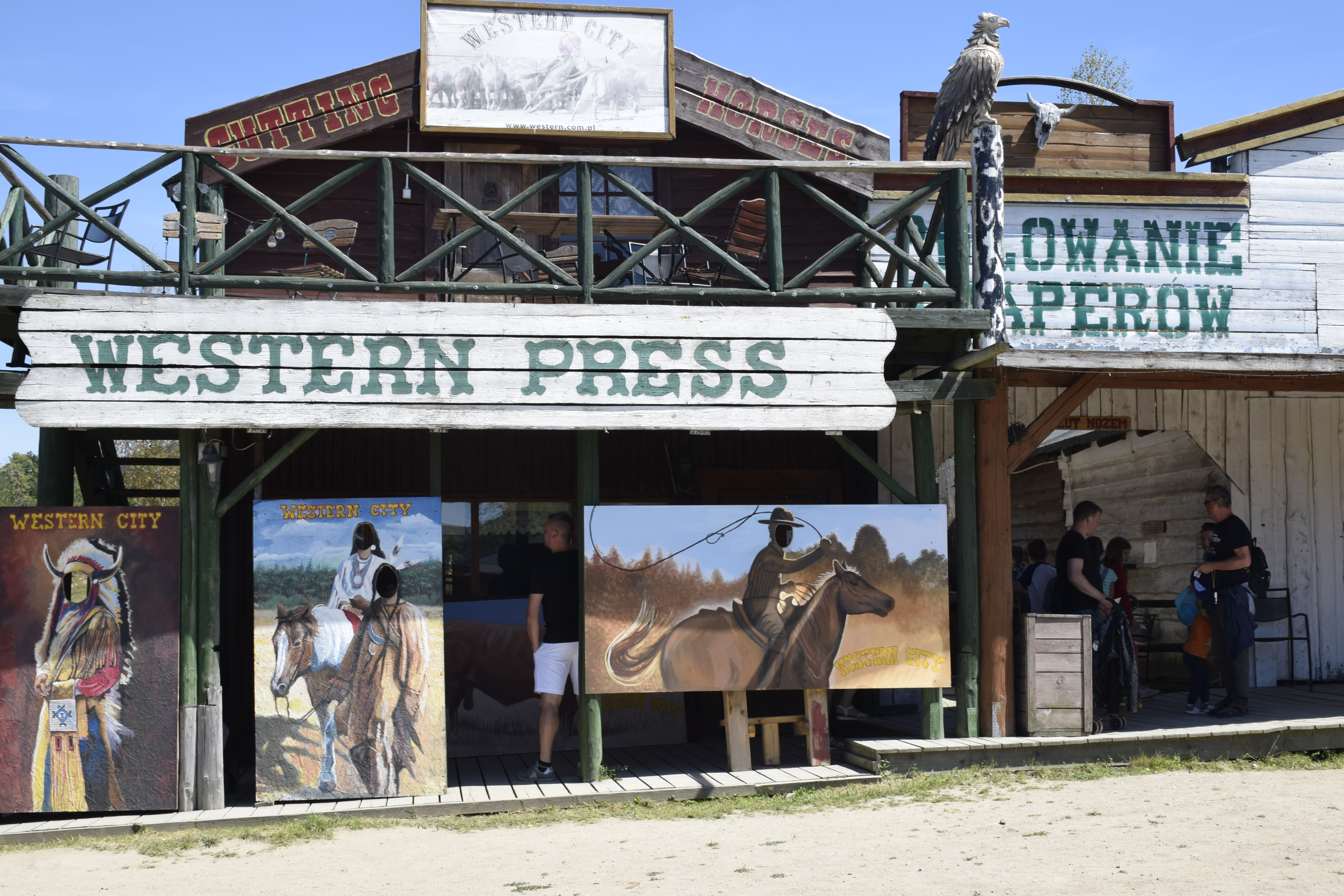
Western city

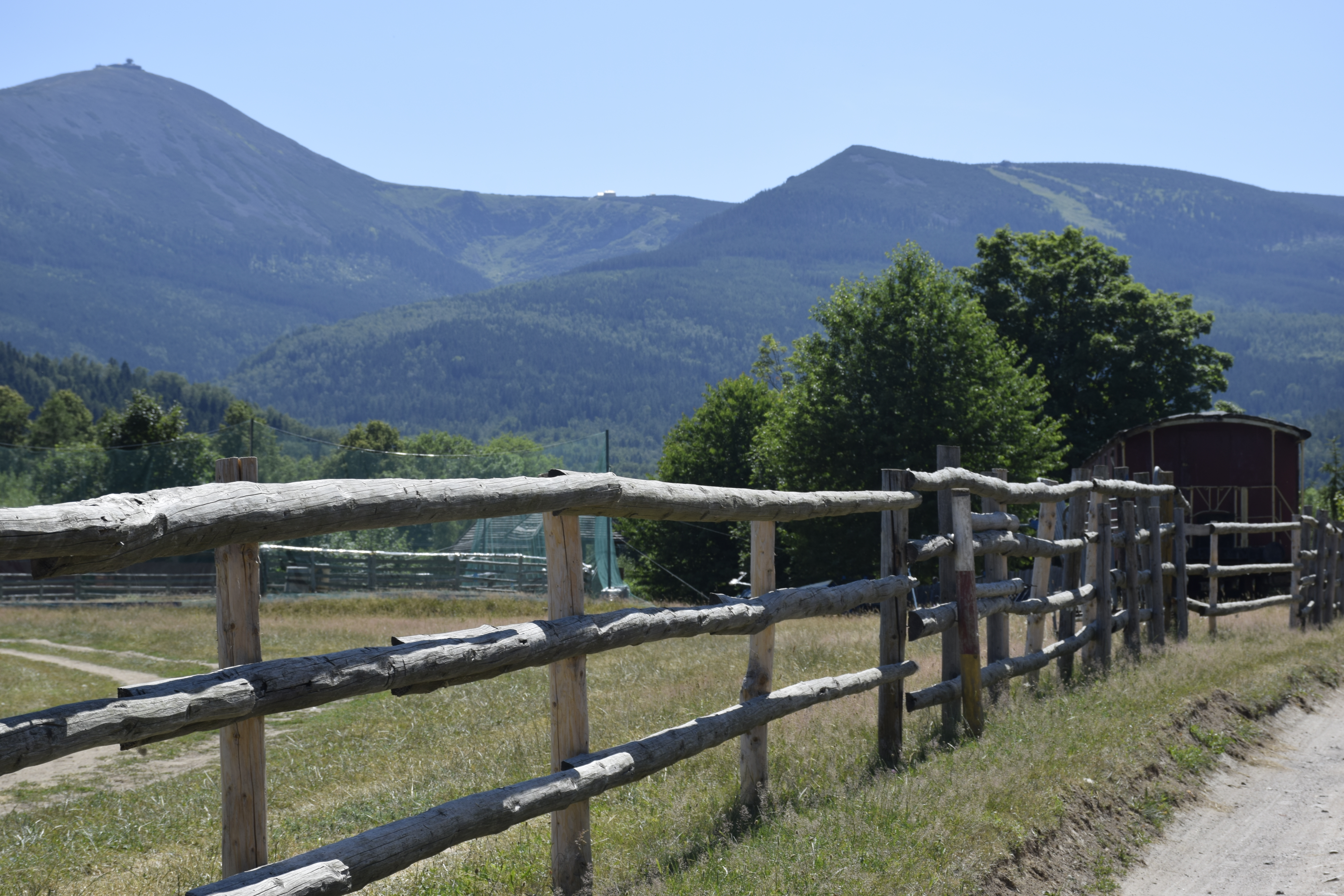
Pastures and mountain by the village

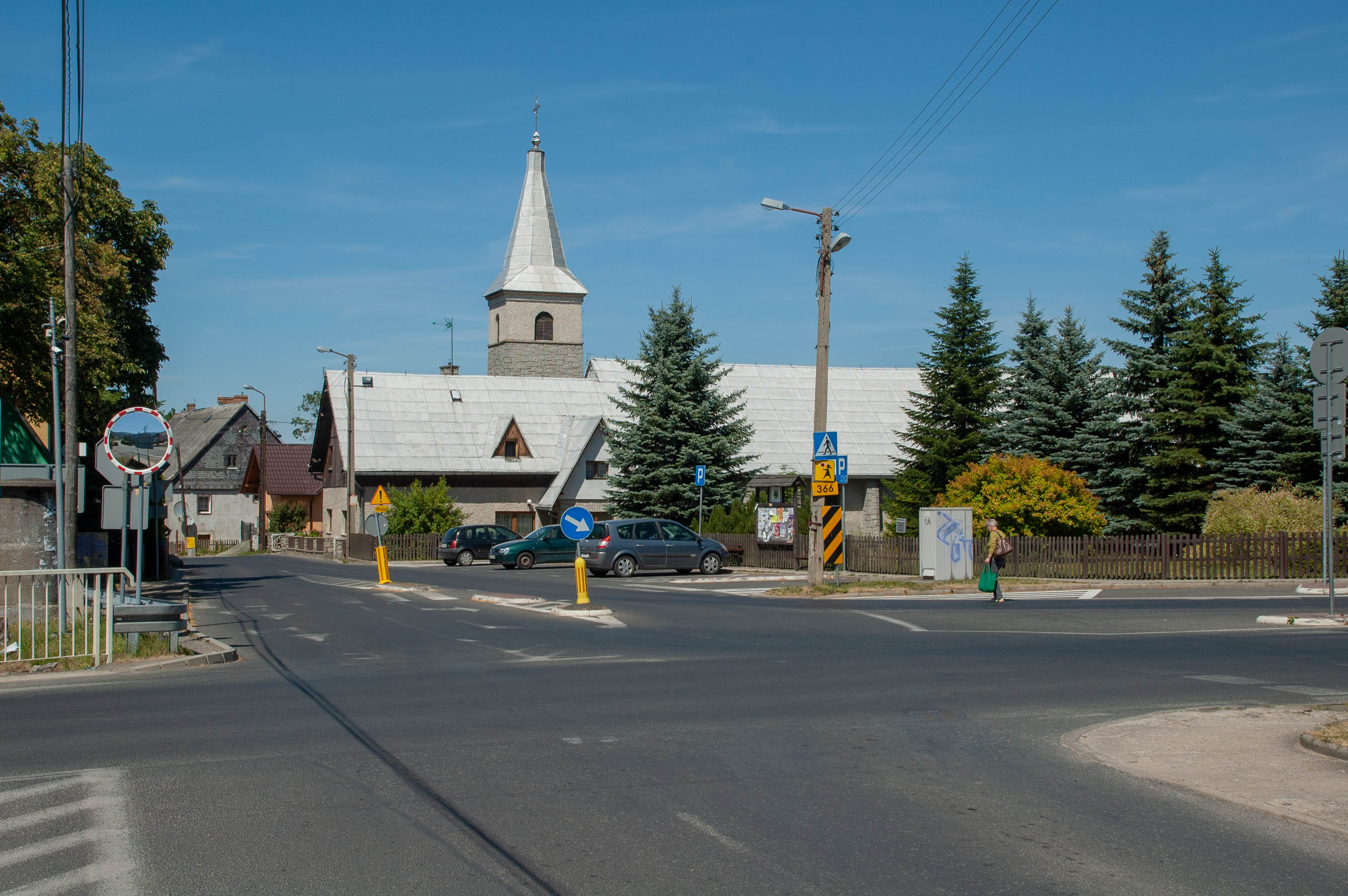
Saint Joseph the Worker church
