= Bolcz Castle =

Castle in the Rudawy Janowickie, Poland

Coordinates: 50.8608°N 15.9120°E

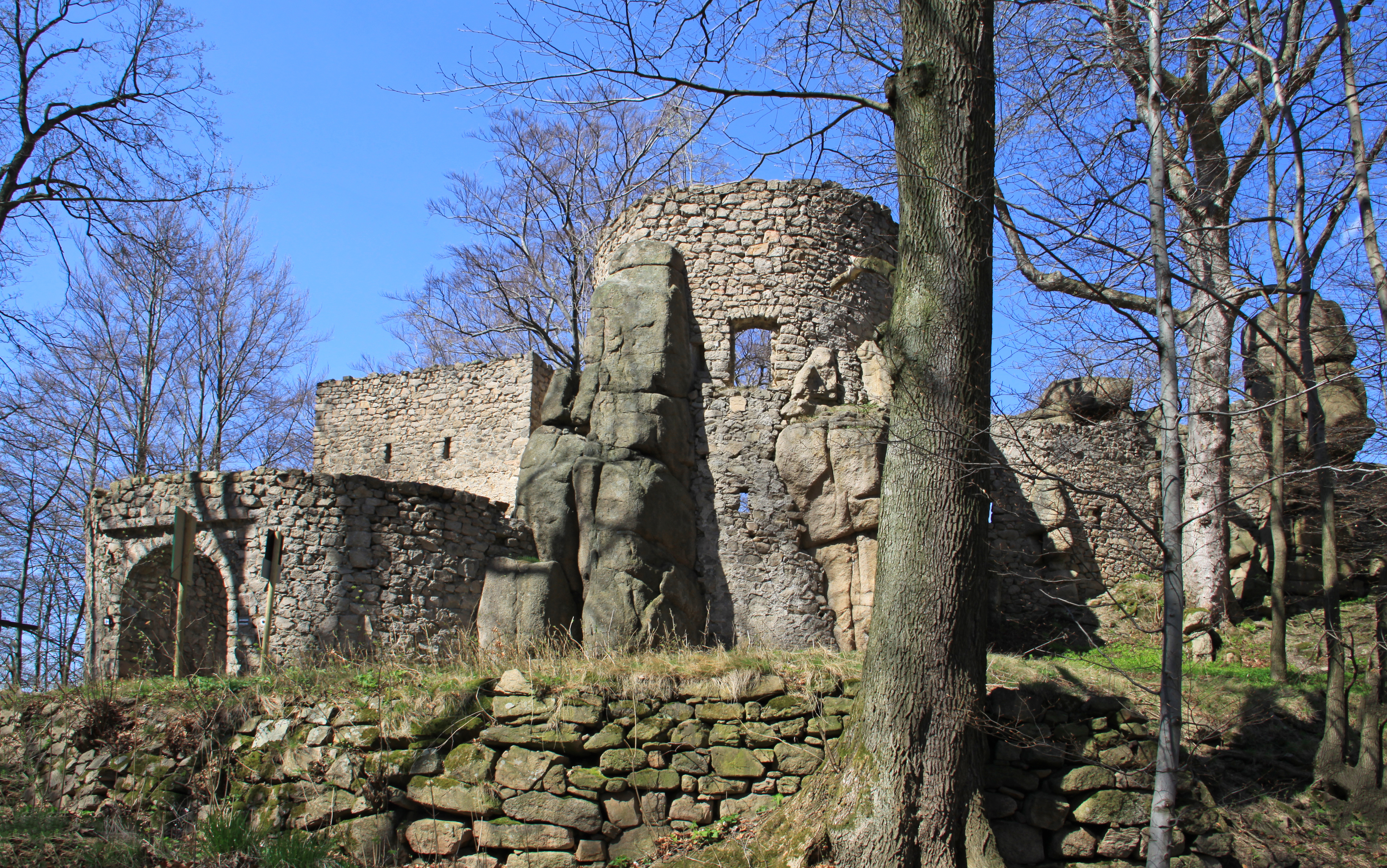
Castle ruins

The Bolcz Castle (German: Bolzenschloss, later Bolkoschloß, Bolzenstein) is a castle with fragments of natural rock walls in Poland, located about 15 kilometres (9.3 mi) from Jelenia Góra, in the northern part of the Rudawy Janowickie, on a rocky, granite protrusion, about 561 metres (1,841 ft) above sea level.

== History ==
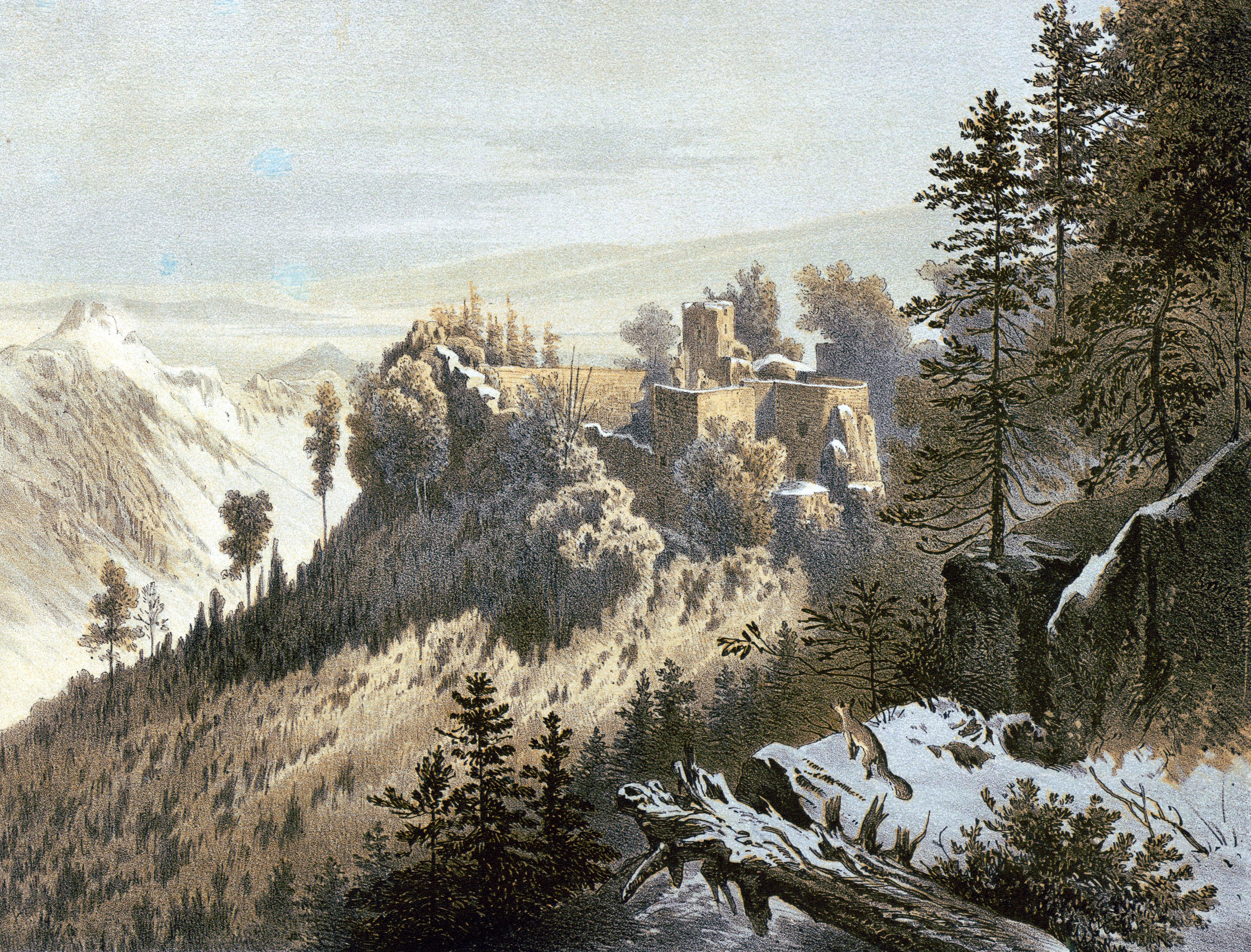
A 19th century artist's vision

The establishment of the castle in 1375 is attributed to a courtier of Duke Bolko II from the Bolcz family. The builder of the castle, Clericus Bolze, supported the Hussite movement and the castle became a nest of raubriters. In the first half of the 15th century it was destroyed during a battle between the townsfolk of Wrocław and Świdnica and the Hussites. The castle was rebuilt by Hans Dippold von Burghaus in 1517–1518. A courtyard was created at that time, with a defensive tower in the southern corner and a number of embrasures in the walls. The castle changed owners one by one - in 1537-1543 it belonged to Justus Decius of Kraków, a courtier and secretary to the Polish king Sigismund the Old. In the years 1520-1550 the castle was expanded again; a stone wall was erected in front of the gate tower, a bastion was built, and a dry moat was constructed. The walls were also adapted to artillery weapons.

Work continued until 1550. In 1562 the castle, together with Janowice and Miedzianka, became the property of the brothers Hans and Franz Heilmann. Probably at the beginning of the 17th century Daniel Schaffgotsch, the owner of Janowice at that time, ordered further improvements to the castle. Further reconstructions took place as a result of the Thirty Years' War. In 1645 the castle was occupied by the Swedes who, upon leaving in December of that year, set fire to the residential buildings. Since then the castle has remained in disrepair. An interest in tourism in the mid-19th century (in 1824 Frederick William III visited the castle) resulted in its reconstruction in 1848 on the initiative of Count Stolberg-Wernigerode. The castle housed a small Swiss-style inn, built on its old foundations. After World War II, the inn housed a tourist hostel, which fell into disrepair over time. The castle is administered by the Śnieżka Forest Inspectorate. It is a part of the Cultural Park of Jelenia Góra Valley established in 2008.

== Architecture ==
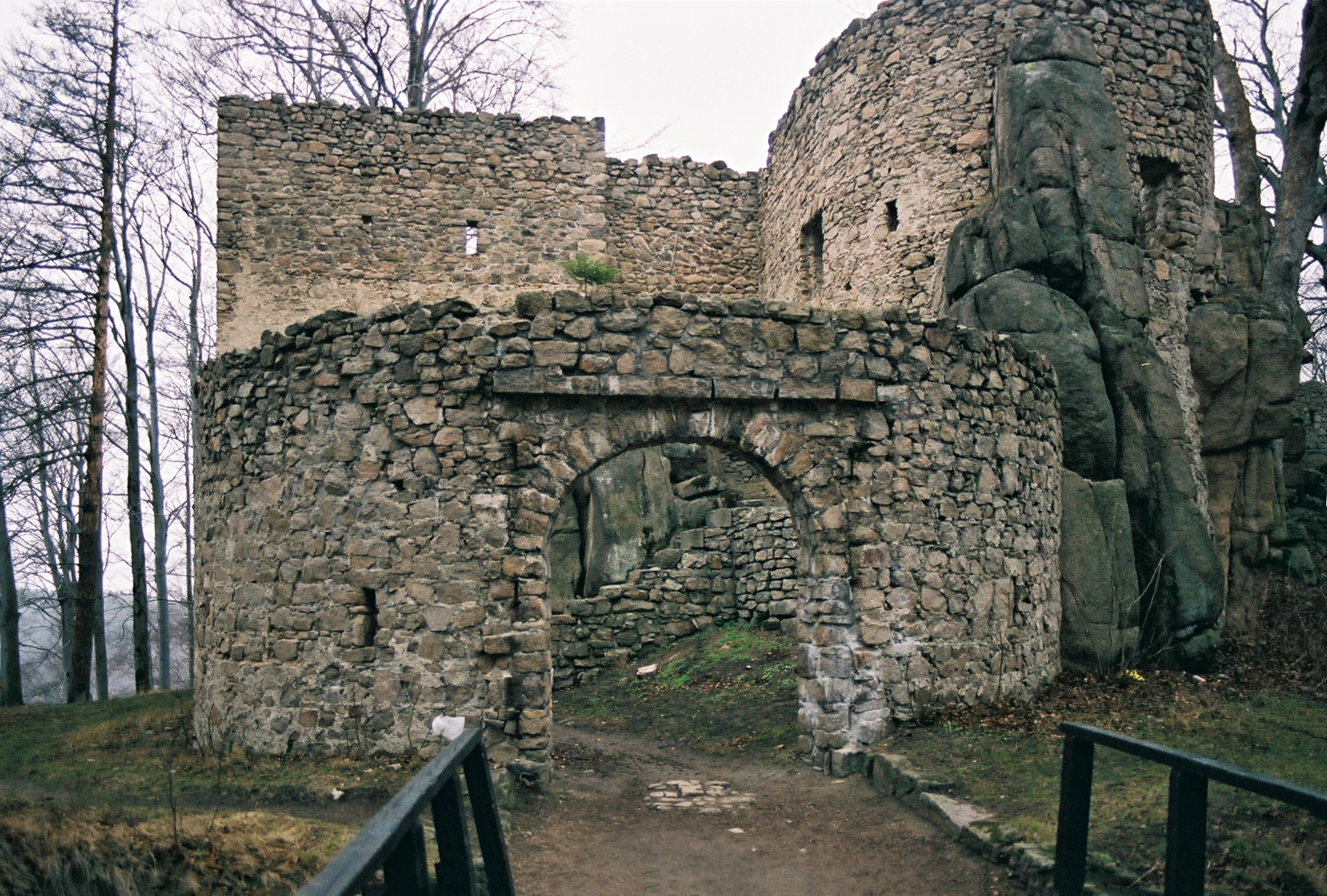
Castle gate

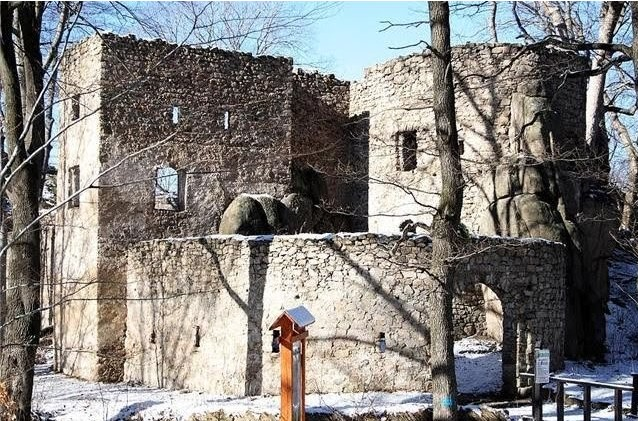
Castle walls

Two granite rocks were used to build the castle, which were connected by stone walls to create a small courtyard. Above them, on the eastern side, a square tower was erected, next to it a house for women, and perpendicularly to it, on the northern side of the walls, on the edge of the slope, a residential building with a basement. Said house measured 20 x 7.8 m, with an entrance accessed directly from the courtyard, its above-ground floors divided into two rooms of similar size. A round chapel was situated on the southern side, and a kitchen and a bakery were located opposite the residential building on the southeast. The castle courtyard included a water cistern.

The ruins preserved to this day make it possible to reconstruct the three main parts of the building: the medieval castle, consisting of peripheral walls, a residential building and a quadrilateral tower; the fifteenth-century part, consisting of two courtyards, the southern wall with embrasures; and the sixteenth-century part, from which the barbican walls, bastions and entrance gate have survived.

== Hiking routes ==
- green tourist trail Janowice Wielkie - Bolcz Castle - Wojanów - Jelenia Góra
- Black tourist trail along the Castle Road to Głaziska Janowickie.
