= Zachełmie, Lower Silesian Voivodeship =

Zachełmie
- Village
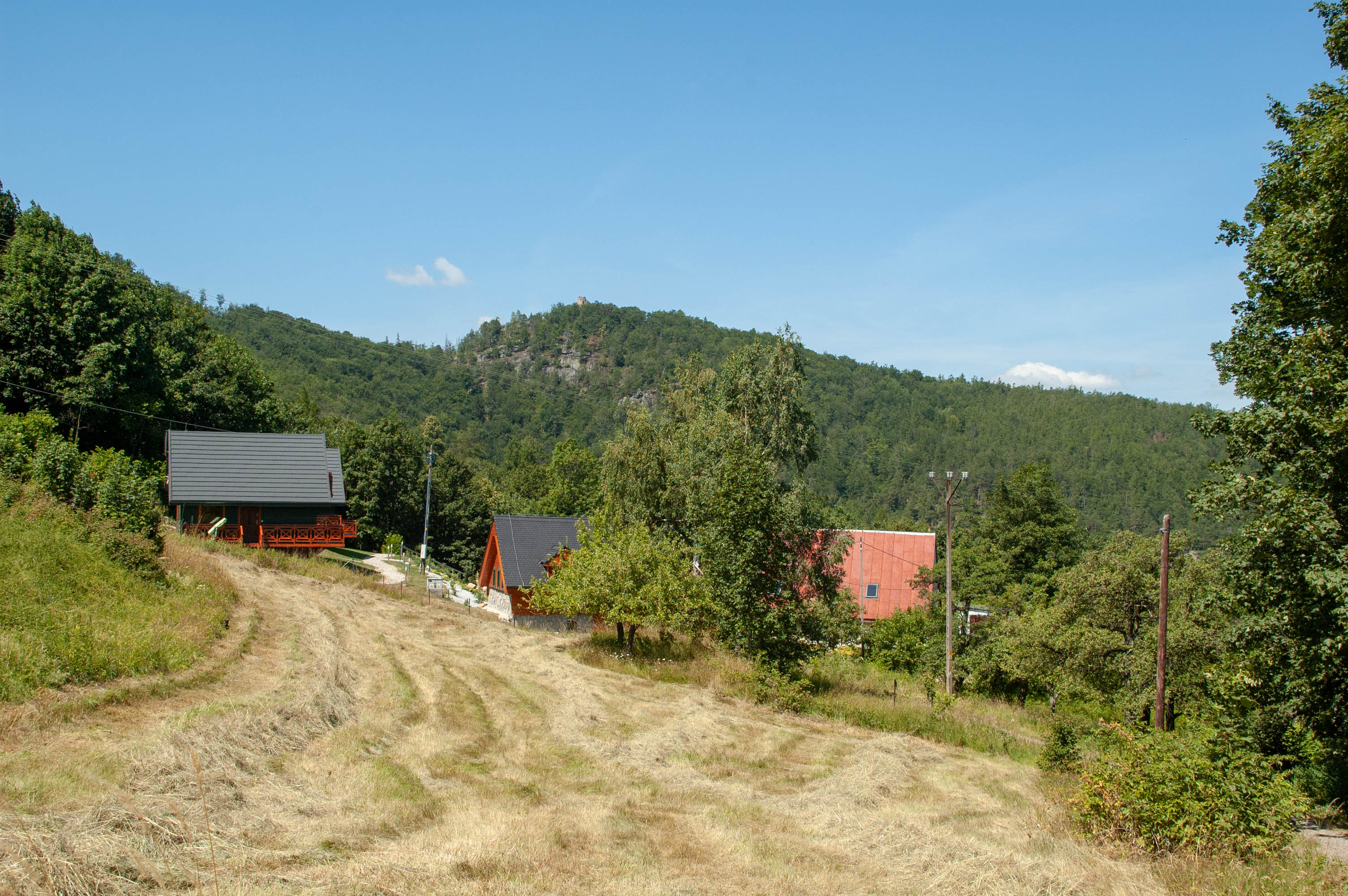

- Location within Poland
- Coordinates: 50°49′N 15°40′E
- Country: Poland
- Voivodeship: Lower Silesian
- Powiat: Karkonosze
- Gmina: Podgórzyn
- Website: http://www.zachelmie.pl/

Zachełmie [zaˈxɛu̯mjɛ] (German: Saalberg) is a village in the administrative district of Gmina Podgórzyn, within Karkonosze County, Lower Silesian Voivodeship, in south-western Poland.

== Gallery ==
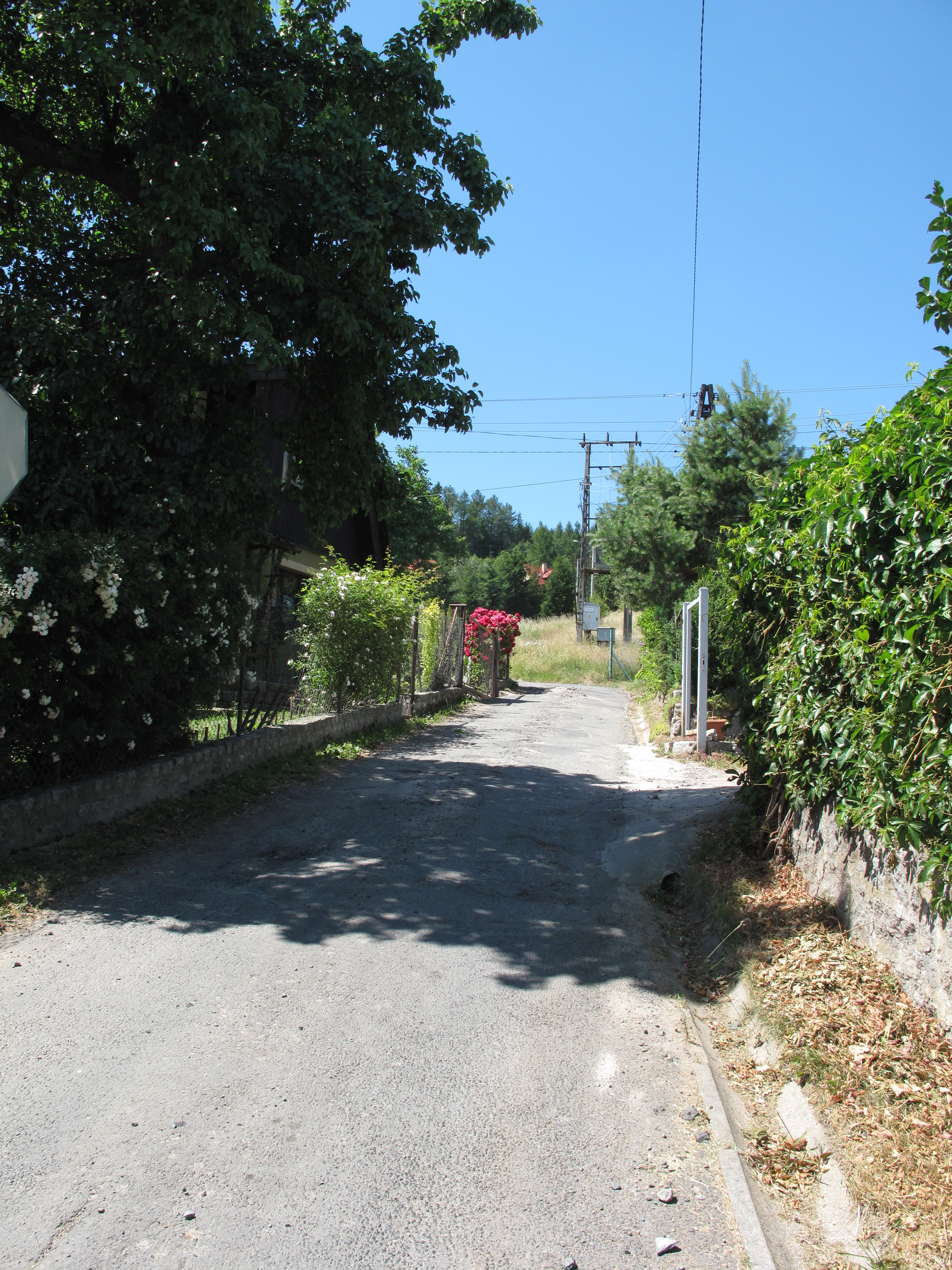

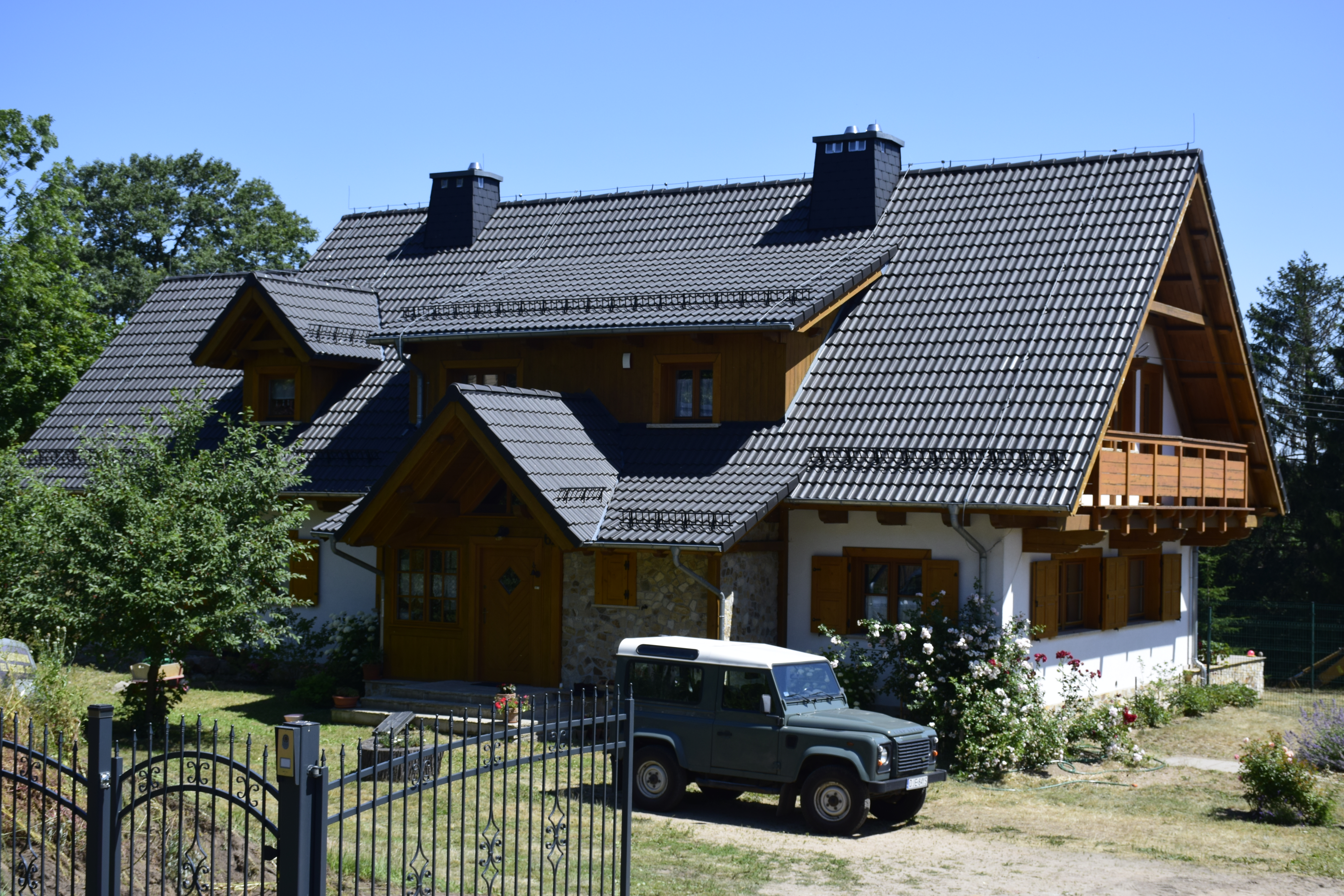

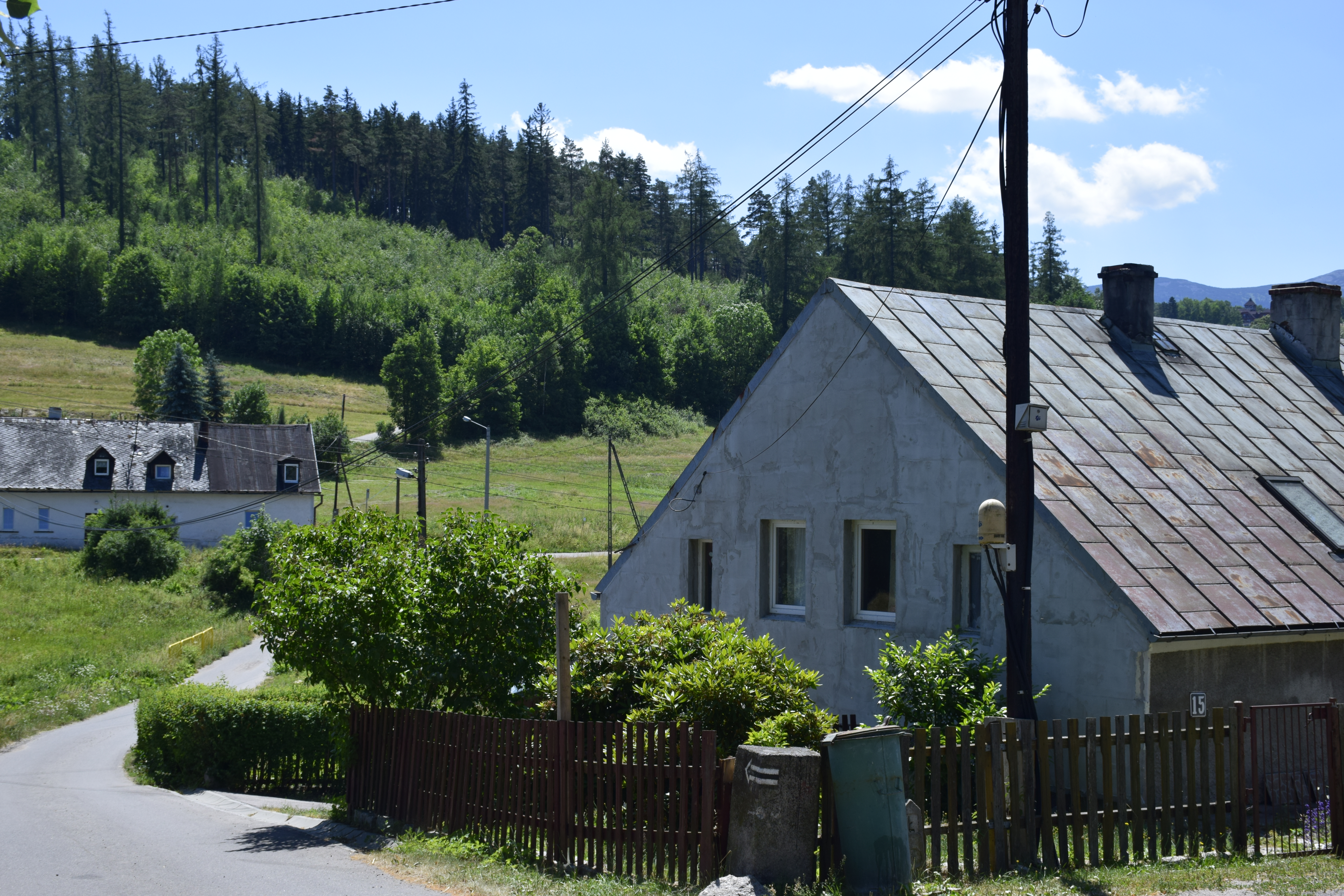
