= Głębock, Lower Silesian Voivodeship =

Głębock
- Village
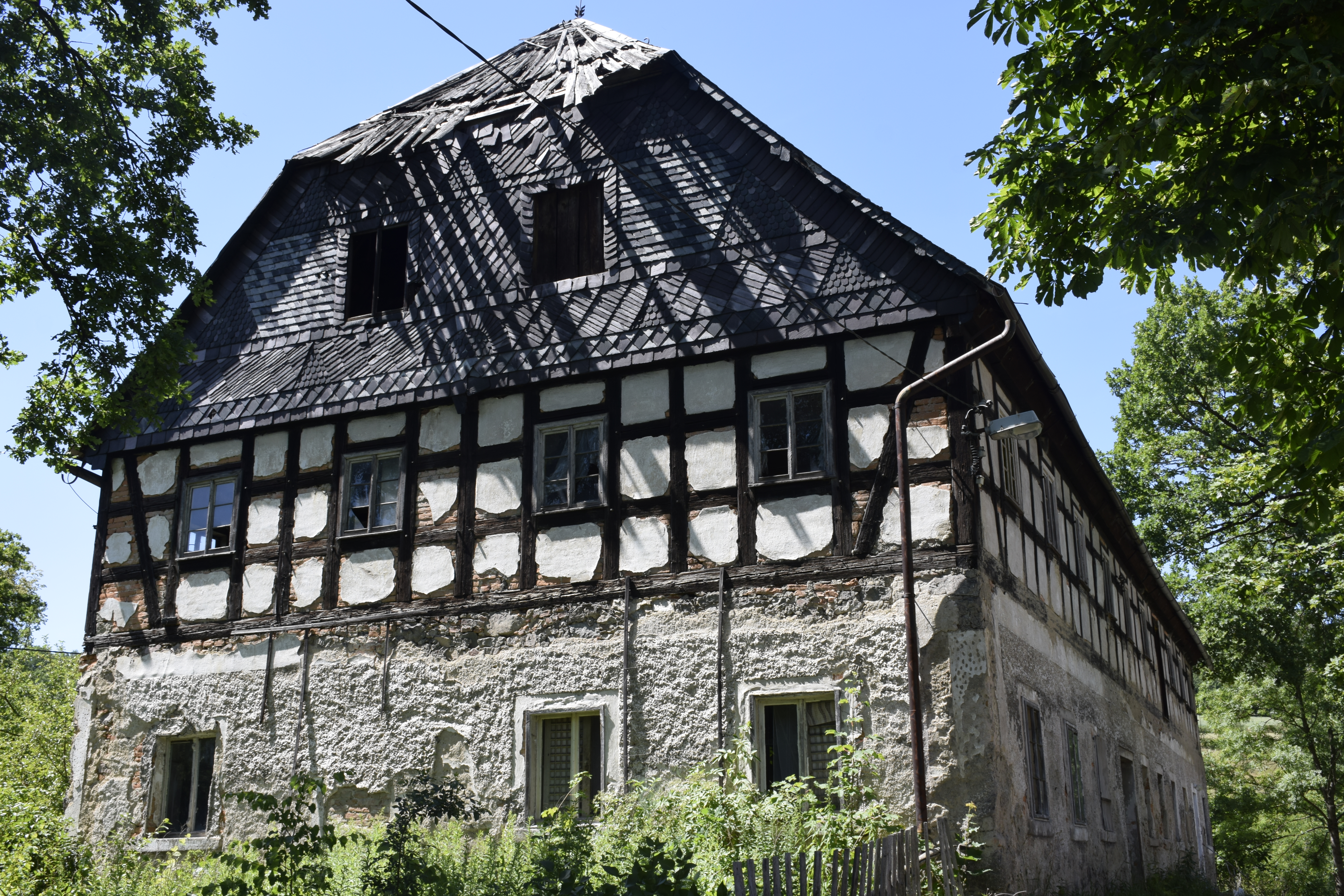
- Umgebindehaus in Głębock

- Location within Poland
- Coordinates: 50°49′27″N 15°44′45″E
- Country: Poland
- Voivodeship: Lower Silesian
- Powiat: Karkonosze
- Gmina: Podgórzyn

Population
  - Estimate: 100

Głębock [ˈɡwɛmbɔt͡sk] (German: Glausnitz) is a village in the administrative district of Gmina Podgórzyn, within Karkonosze County, Lower Silesian Voivodeship, in south-western Poland.

The village has an approximate population of 100.

== Gallery ==
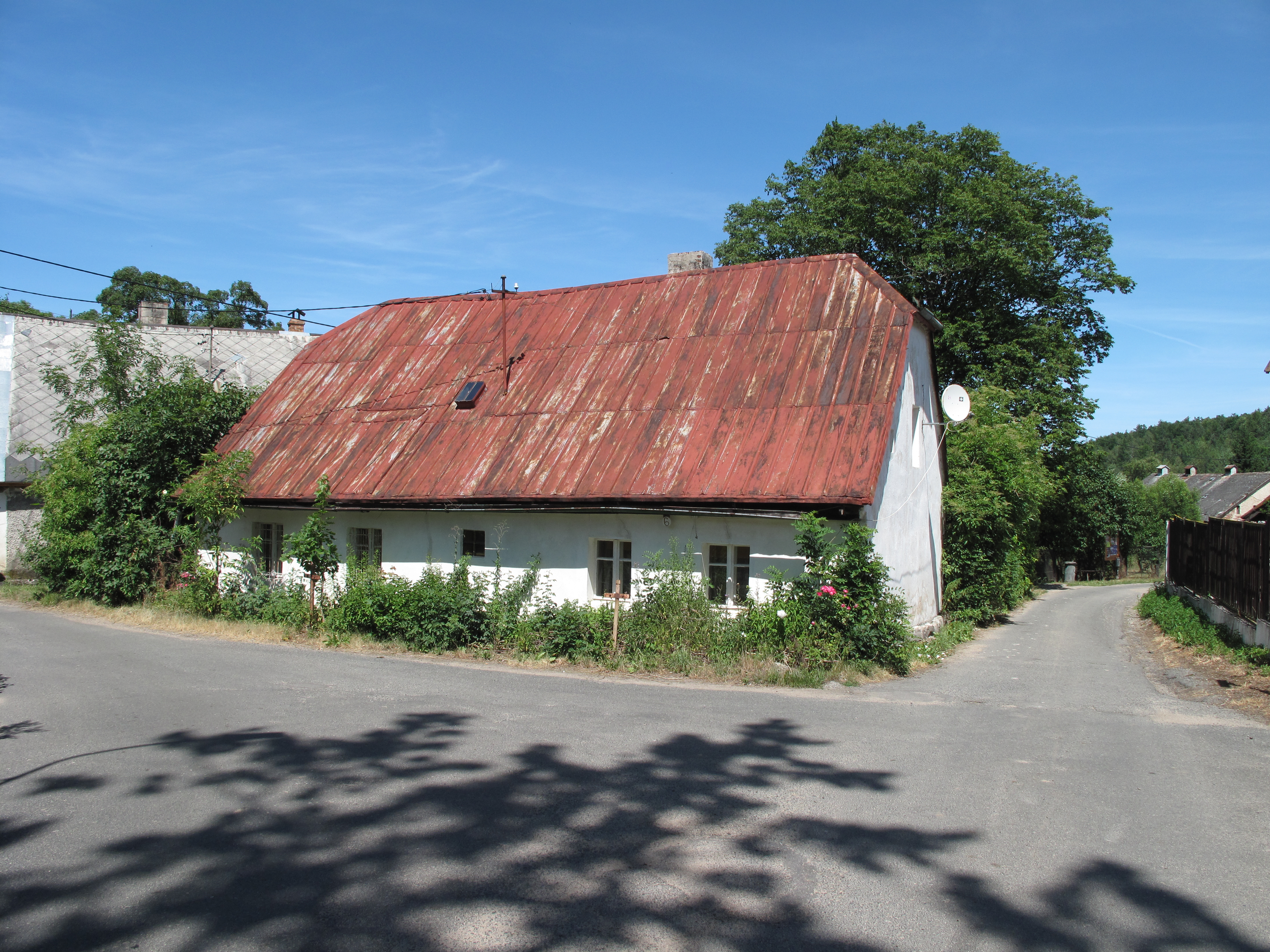
House at the cross roads

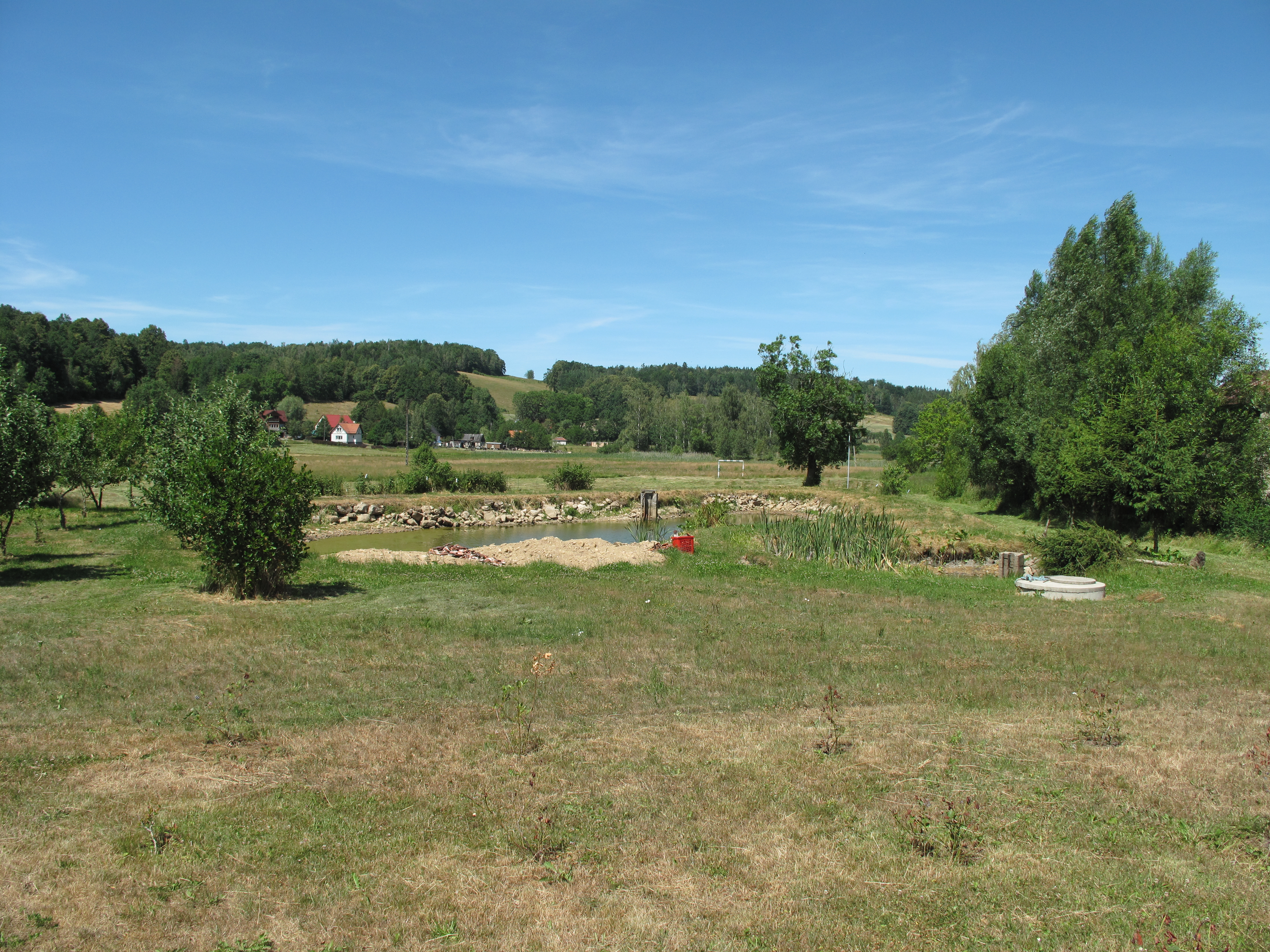
Pond in the garden

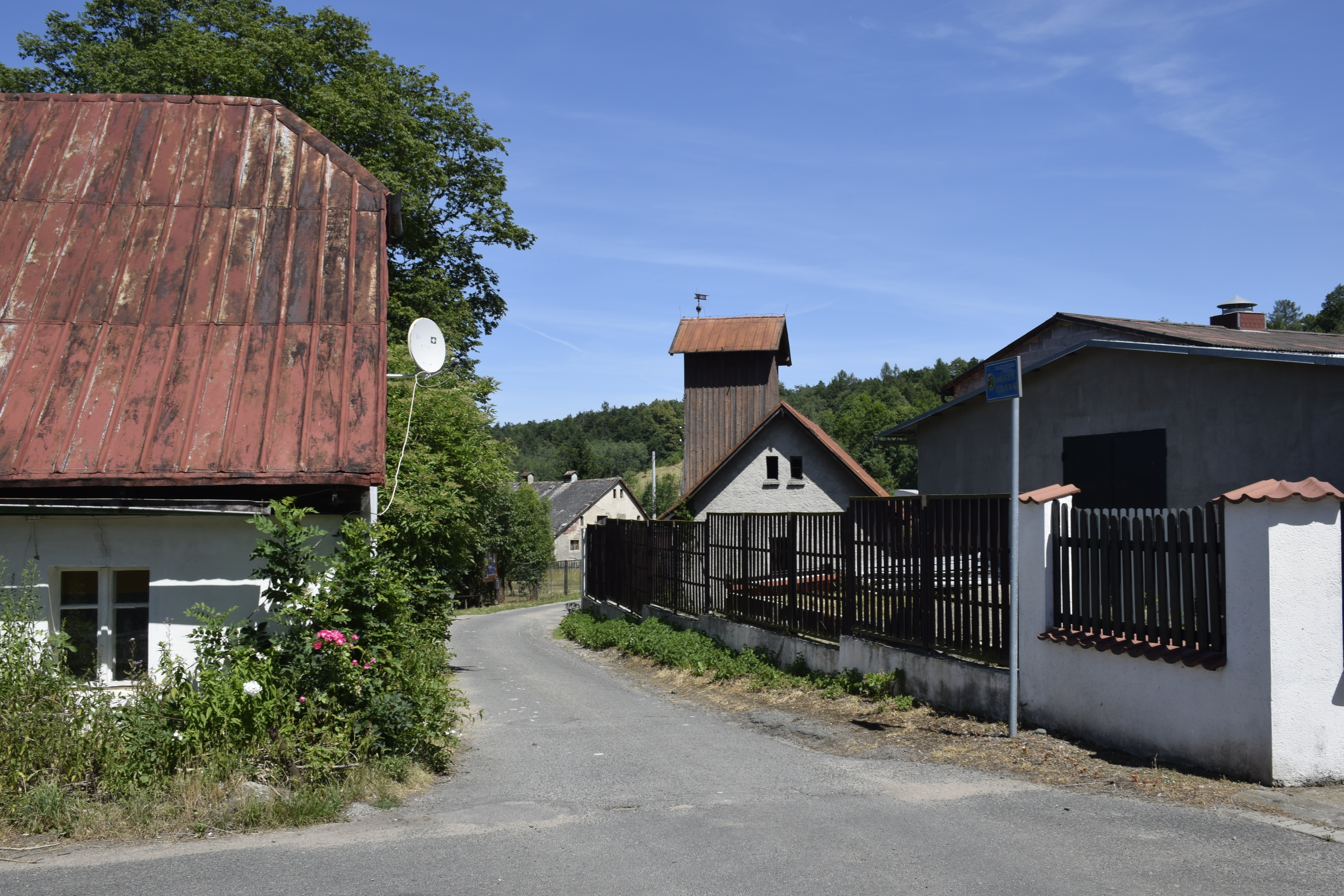
Road with firestation tower
