= Podgórzyn, Lower Silesian Voivodeship =

Podgórzyn
- Village
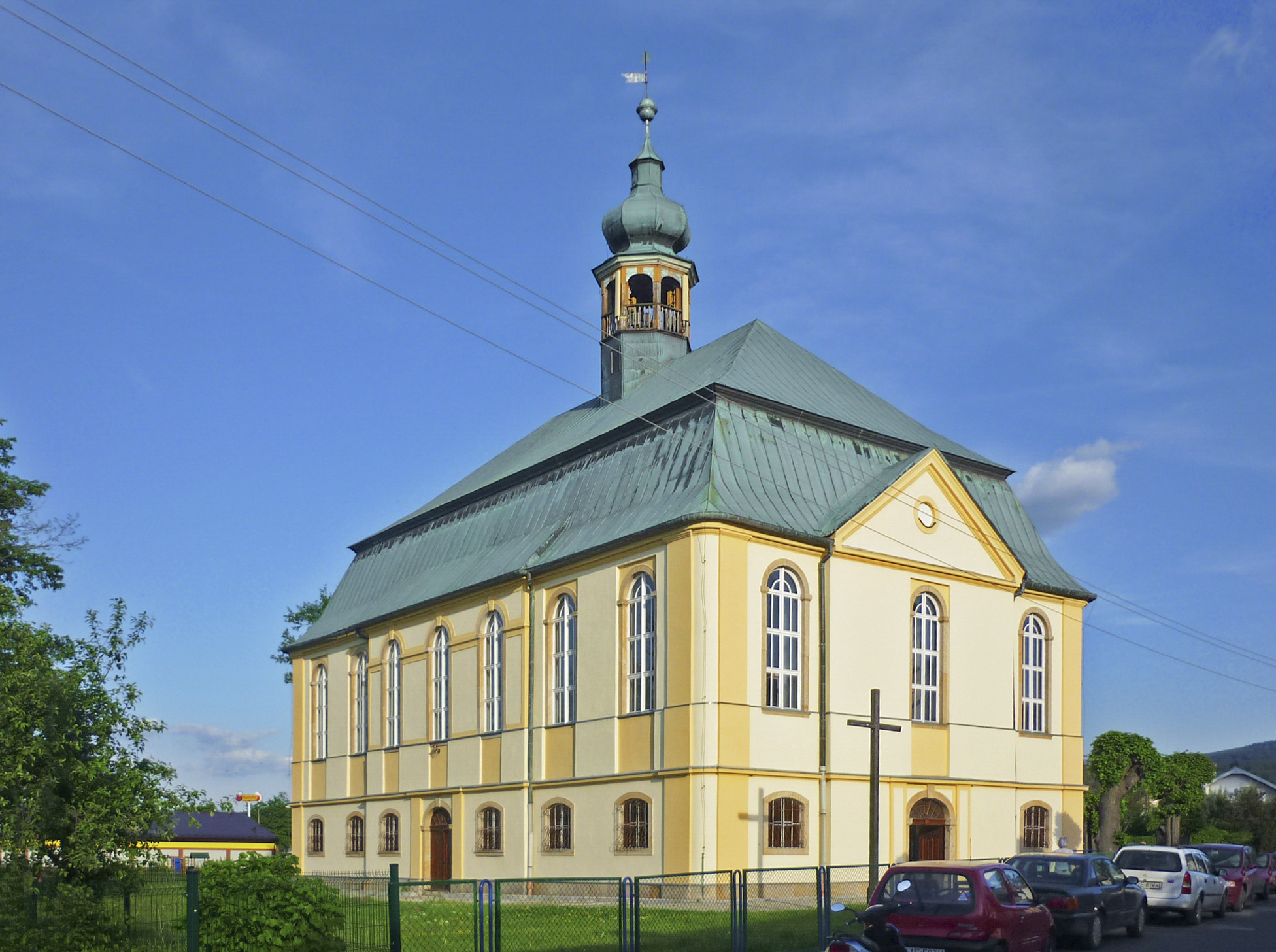
- Catholic Church of Our Lady of Częstochowa

- Location within Poland
- Coordinates: 50°49′57″N 15°41′1″E
- Country: Poland
- Voivodeship: Lower Silesian
- Powiat: Karkonosze
- Gmina: Podgórzyn
- First mentioned: 1318

Population
  - Total: 1,700
- Time zone: UTC+1 (CET)
  - Summer (DST): UTC+2 (CEST)
- Vehicle registration: DJE

Podgórzyn [pɔdˈɡuʐɨn] (German: Giersdorf) is a village in Karkonosze County, Lower Silesian Voivodeship, in south-western Poland. It is the seat of the administrative district (gmina) called Gmina Podgórzyn.

== History ==
The area became part of the emerging Polish state in the 10th century. Initially it was administratively part of the Wleń castellany. The village was first mentioned in 1318, when it was part of fragmented Piast-ruled Poland.

During World War II, in 1940–1942, the Germans used Belgian, French and Soviet prisoners of war and possibly also Czech and Polish civilians for forced labour to build a road connecting the village with Przełęcz Karkonoska, however, the construction was not completed.

From 1911 to 1965, Podgórzyn was connected with Jelenia Góra by tram.

== Sights ==
Cultural heritage sights of Podgórzyn include the Baroque Our Lady of Częstochowa church and Holy Trinity church.
