= Staniszów =

Staniszów Stonsdorf
- Village
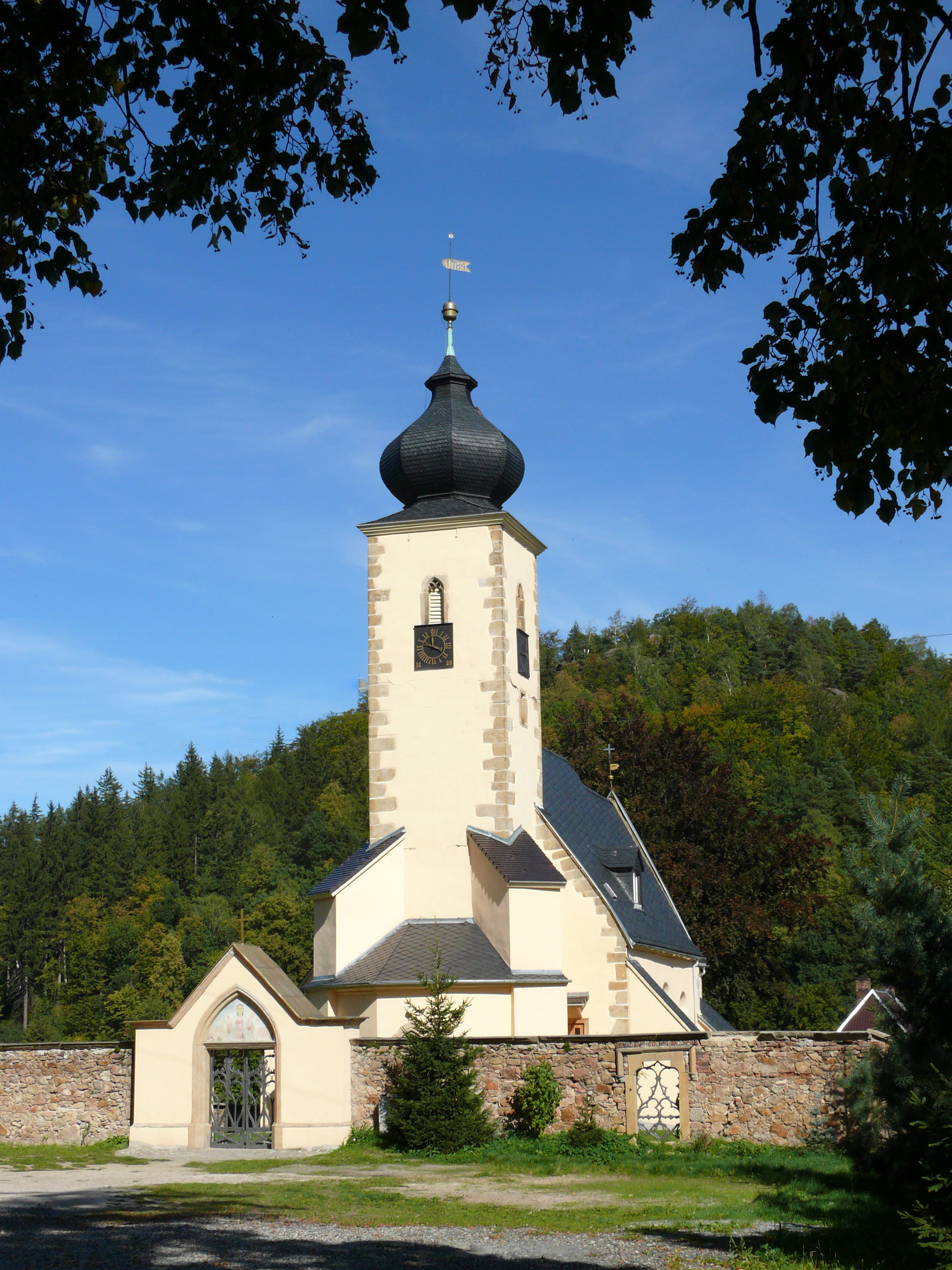
- Church of the Transfiguration in Staniszów

- Location within Poland
- Coordinates: 50°50′59″N 15°43′34″E
- Country: Poland
- Voivodeship: Lower Silesian
- County: Karkonosze
- Gmina: Podgórzyn
- Population: 817 (2,011)

Staniszów [staˈniʂuf] (German: Stonsdorf) is a village in the administrative district of Gmina Podgórzyn, within Karkonosze County, Lower Silesian Voivodeship, in south-western Poland.

The herbal bitter Echt Stonsdorfer, today produced by Berentzen in Germany, originated in this village.
