= Corconti =

Ancient Germanic people

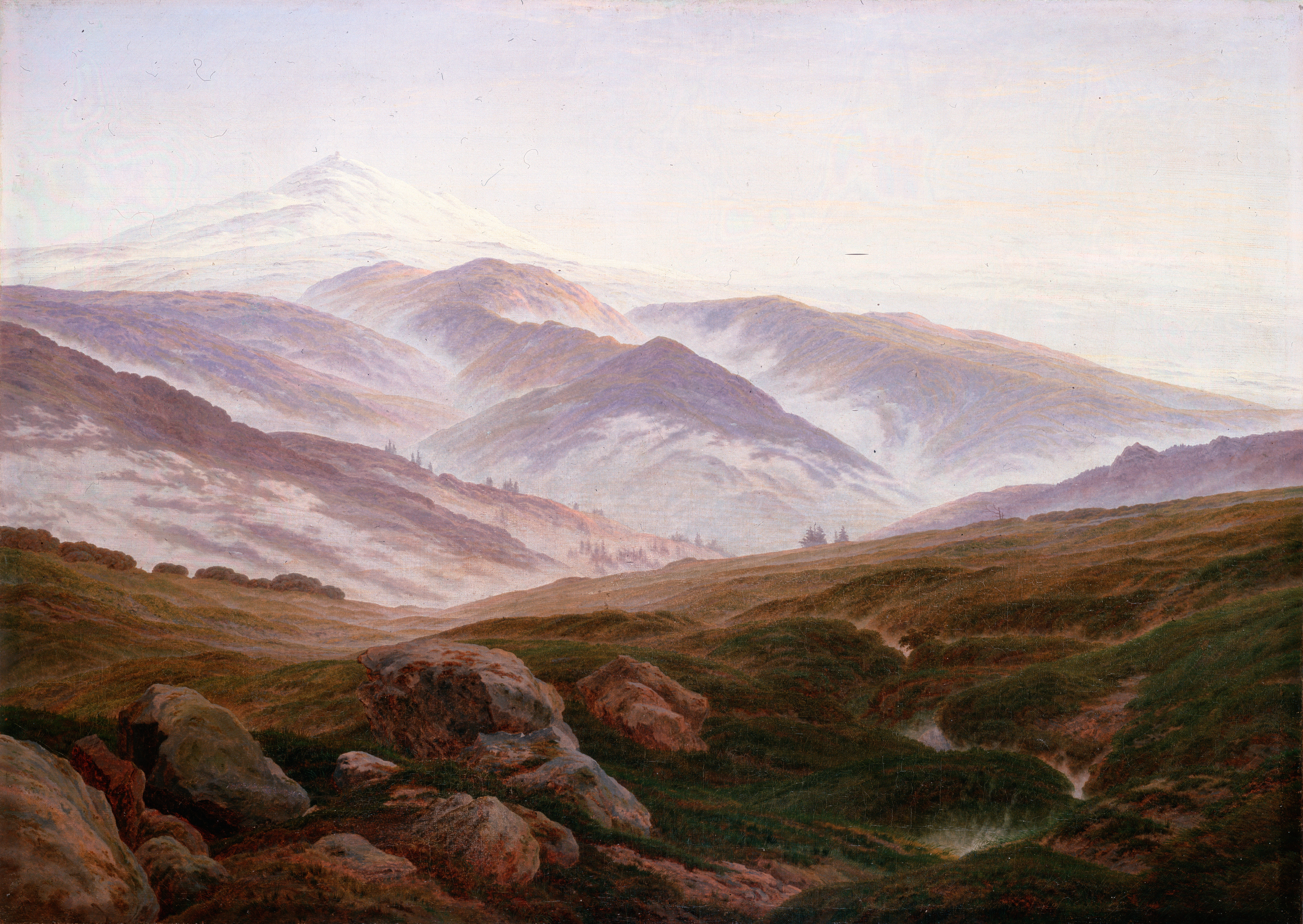
Memories of the Riesengebirge, painting by Caspar David Friedrich, before 1835

The Corconti or Korkontoi were an ancient people, named as Germanic, in (2.10) of the Geography of Ptolemy (after 83 – 161 AD). They resided in the vicinity of Asciburgius Mountain near the Elbe river. Asciburgius was on the edge of the modern Sudetes range (Krkonoše in Czech, Karkonosze in Polish, Riesengebirge in German).

The name of the tribe may be related to the modern Slavic names for the terrain but that is uncertain. Ptolemy counted them among the peoples inhabiting Magna Germania. Their eastern neighbours were the Lugi Buri, who bordered the sources of the Vistula.

== See also ==
- List of Germanic peoples

== Resources ==
- Opera Corcontica - Scientific Journal from the Krkonoše National Park
