= Podgórna Falls =

Waterfall in the Giant Mountains, Poland

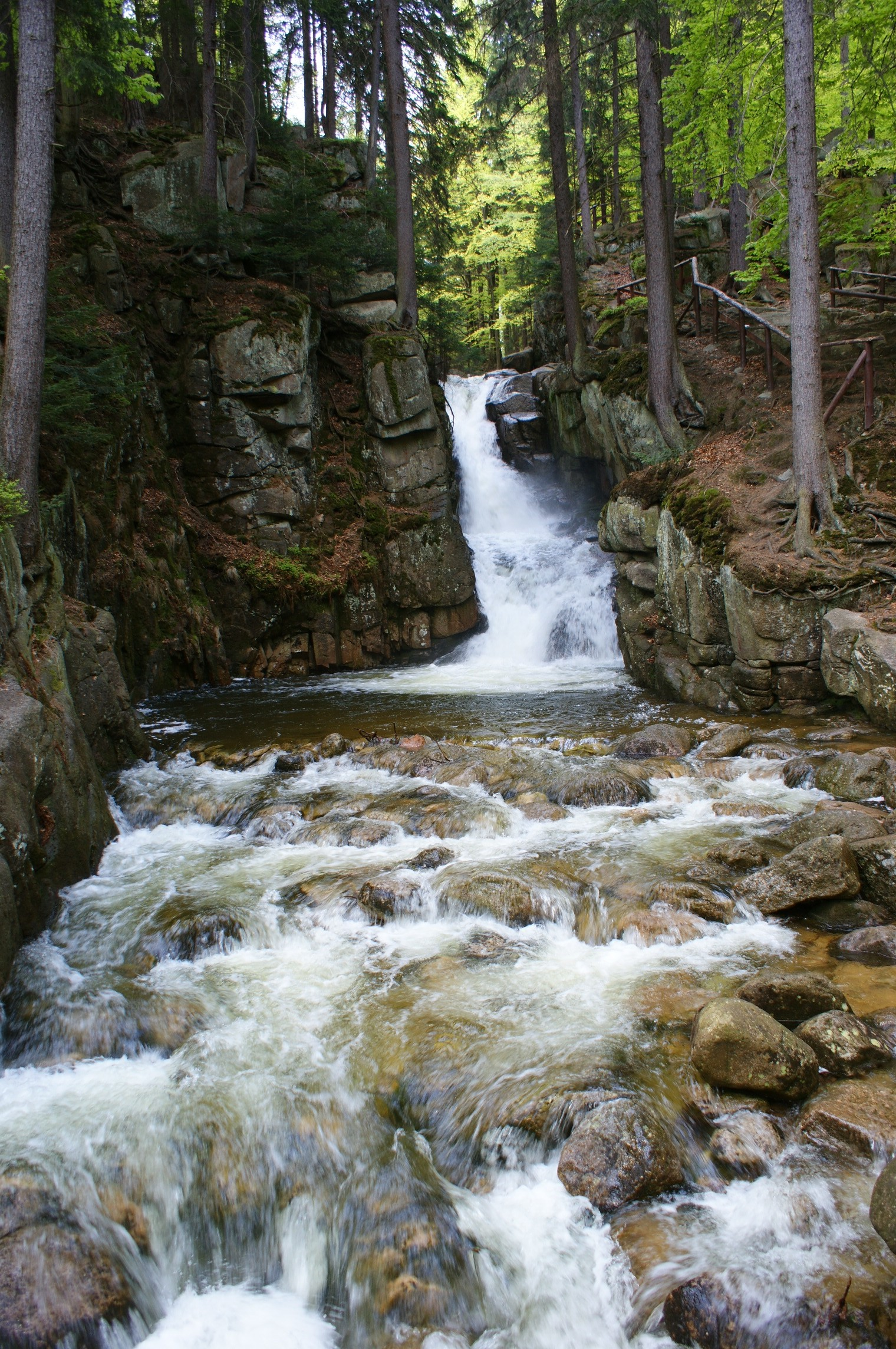
- General view of the waterfall
- Interactive map of Podgórna Falls
- Location: Giant Mountains, Poland
- Coordinates: 50°48′14″N 15°40′06″E
- Type: Cascade
- Elevation: 547 m (1,795 ft)
- Total height: 10 m (33 ft)
- Watercourse: Podgórna

Podgórna Falls (pronounced: [ˈpɔdˈɡurna]; Polish: Wodospad Podgórnej; German: Hainfall) is a cascade waterfall located on the Podgórna Stream in the Giant Mountains, Lower Silesia, Poland, dropping a total of 10 metres (33 ft).

== Description and history ==
Podgórna Falls is located at 547 metres (1,795 ft) above sea level and is around 10 meters high, which makes it the third highest waterfall in the Polish part of the Giant Mountains. The water from the Podgórna Stream flows from the spring between Mały Szyszak and Mount Tępy Szczyt. It falls down a 10-meter rocky ledge in two cascades into a plunge pool. On both sides of the waterfall, there are granite cliffs reaching the heights of up to 15 meters. A tourist trail from Przesieka to Sosnówka is located next to Podgórna Falls. The falls and its surroundings have been designated a Natura 2000 protected area and constitute a special buffer zone (Polish: otulina) of the Karkonosze National Park.

In the past, an inn was located near the waterfall, which no longer exists. In 2007, there were plans to build a small hydroelectric power plant on the Podgórna Stream, which would deprive the waterfall of 70% of water. After receiving initial approval from the local authorities, the plans were scrapped later in the year.

== Gallery ==
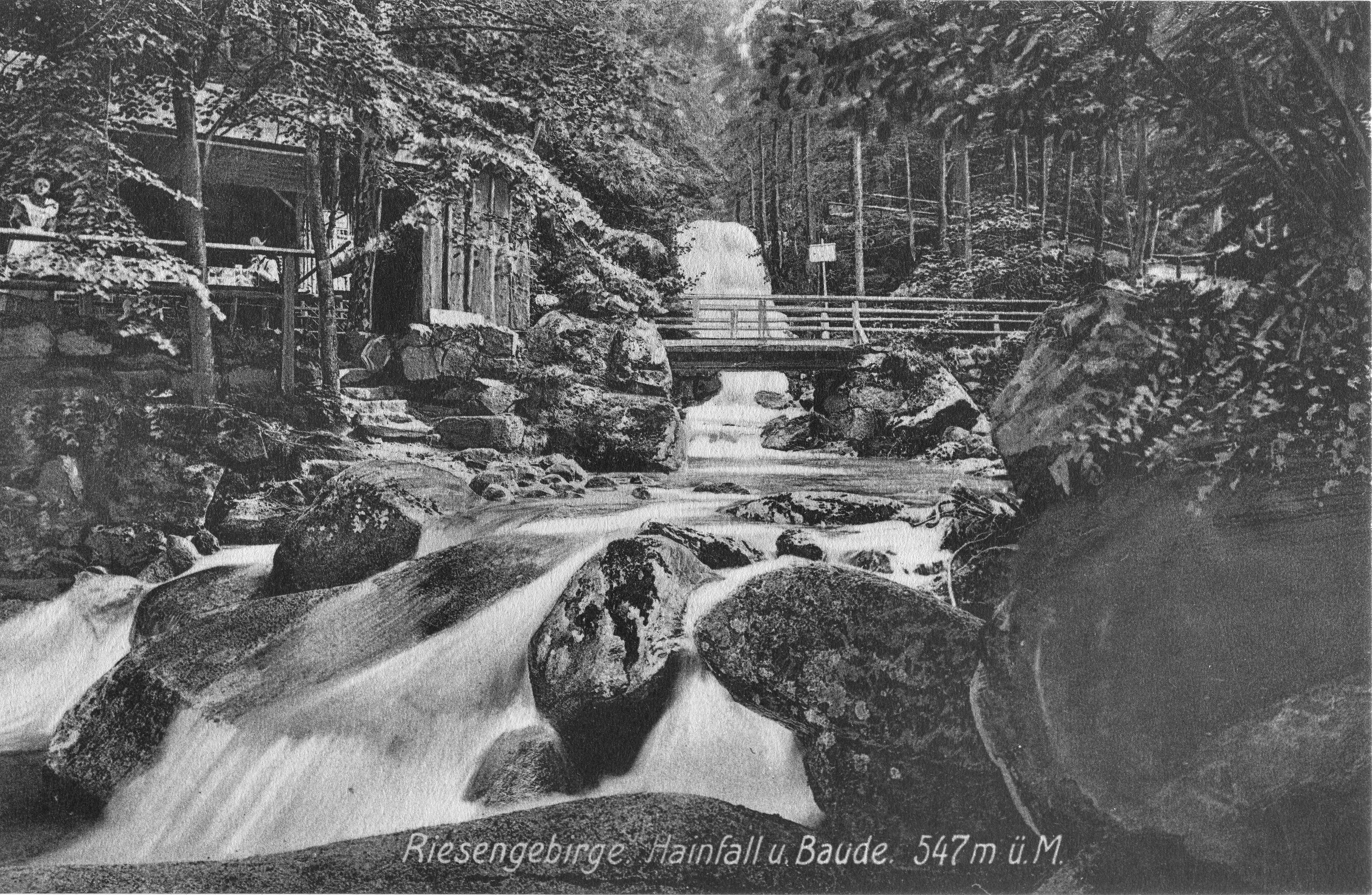
An early 20th-century German postcard depicting the waterfall.

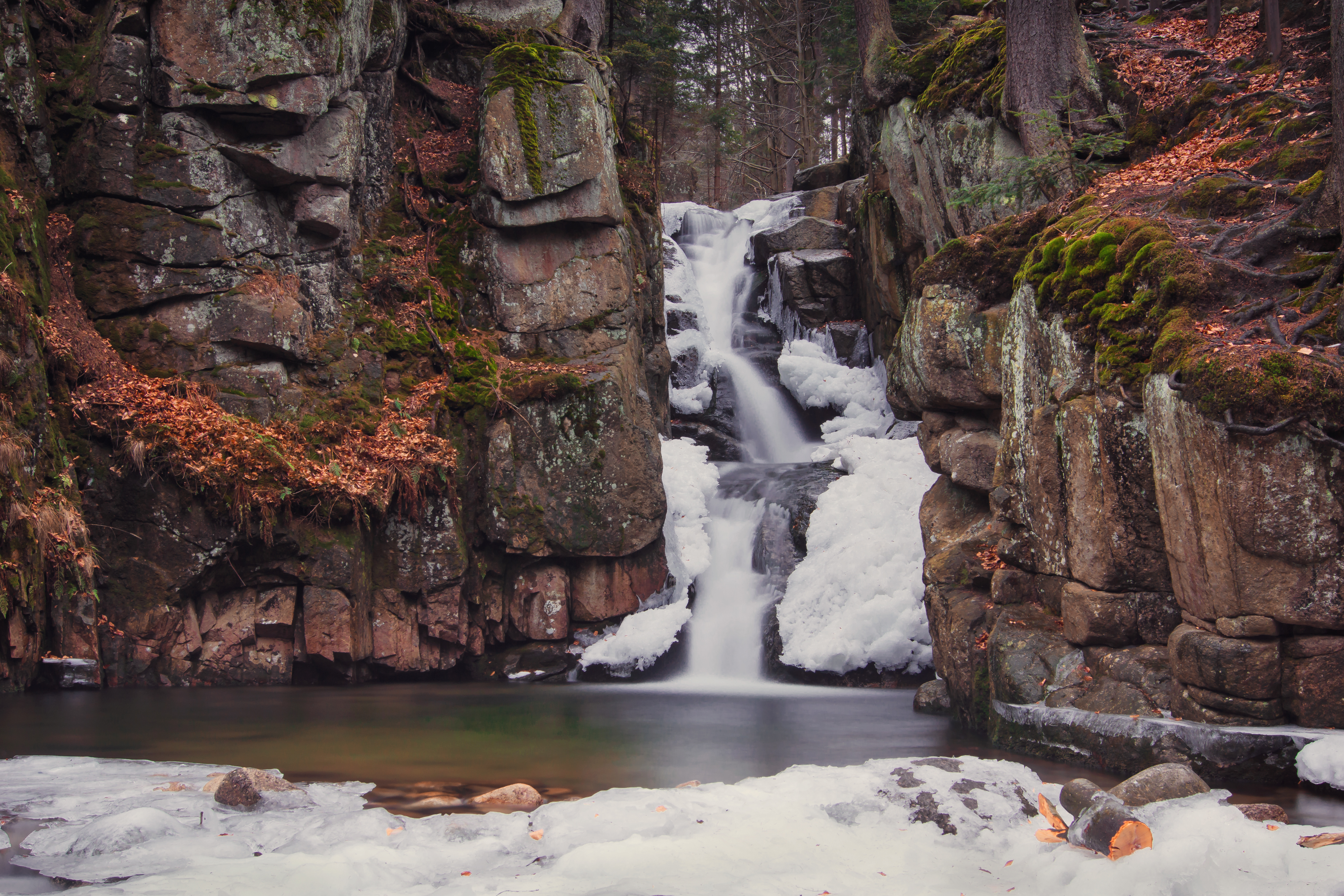
Podgórna Falls in winter

== See also ==
- Geography of Poland
- List of waterfalls
- Kamieńczyk Falls
