= Szklarki Falls =

Waterfall in the Giant Mountains, Poland

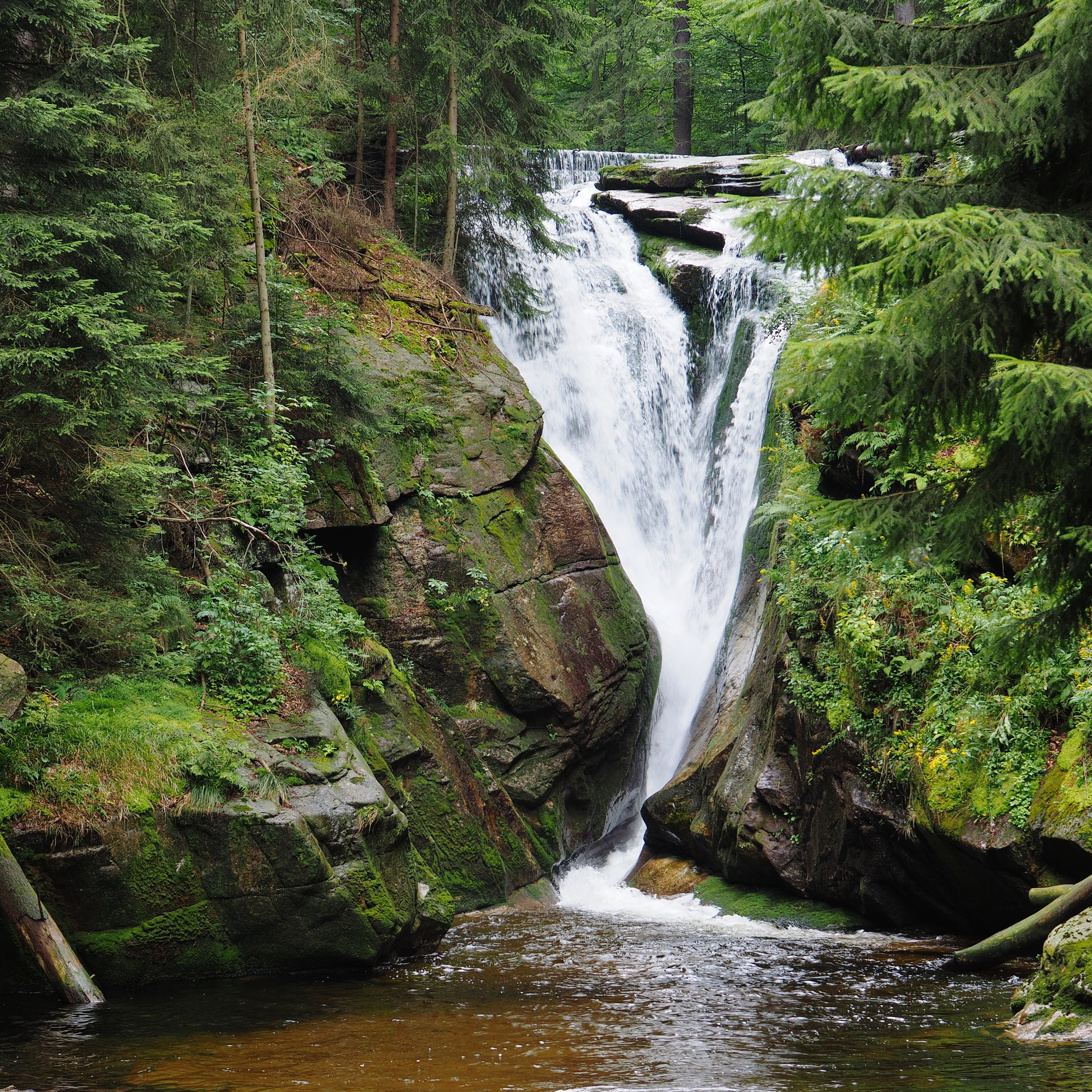
- General view of the waterfall
- Interactive map of Szklarki Falls
- Location: Giant Mountains, Poland
- Coordinates: 50°49′48″N 15°33′18″E
- Type: Segmented
- Elevation: 525 m (1,722 ft)
- Total height: 13.3 m (44 ft)
- Watercourse: Szklarka

Szklarki Falls (pronounced: [ˈʂklarki]; Polish: Wodospad Szklarki; German: Kochenfall) is a waterfall located in the Giant Mountains, Lower Silesia, Poland, dropping a total of 13.3 metres (44 ft). The waterfall and its surroundings form an exclave of the Karkonosze National Park. It is the second highest waterfall of the national park.

== Description ==
Szklarki Falls is located at 525 metres (1,722 ft) above sea level and is 13.3 meters high. Its waters fall in a wide cascade characteristically narrowing downwards and spiraling, where it forms a plunge pool.

In 1868, an inn was opened near the waterfall, which today functions as a mountain shelter named "Kochanówka".

To enter the national park, visitors need to pay an admission fee. There is a 1-km long trail leading to the waterfall at the end of which is a viewing platform. The trail is also accessible for disabled people.

== See also ==
- Geography of Poland
- List of waterfalls
- Kamieńczyk Falls
