= Grzbiet Lasocki =

Mountain ridge in the Czech Republic and Poland

Highest point
- Peak: Łysocina
- Listing: Giant Mountains
- Coordinates: 50°43′28″N 15°49′46″E

Geography
- Countries: Czech Republic, Poland
- State(s): Hradec Králové Region, Lower Silesian Voivodeship

Grzbiet Lasocki (Czech: Pomezní hřeben) is a mountain ridge in the eastern part of the Giant Mountains within the Western Sudetes. It is located on the Czech–Polish border. It is a small, 4 km long geomorphological formation. It is formed from metamorphic rocks.

Grzbiet Lasocki formed part of the Czech–Polish border since the 10th century. In 1292, Duke Bolko I the Strict of the Piast dynasty granted the Polish part of Grzbiet Lasocki to the Cistercian Krzeszów Abbey.
