= Opera Corcontica =

Opera Corcontica Krkonošské práce Prace karkonoskie
- Editor: František Krahulec, Stanislav Březina, Martin Erlebach, Jan Materna
- Format: A5
- Publisher: Správa KRNAP
- Founded: 1964
- Company: Správa KRNAP
- Country: Czechia
- Website: opera.krnap.cz

Opera Corcontica – Scientific Journal from the Krkonoše National Park is a Czech Republic–based yearly journal that publishes peer-reviewed, original papers relating to the Giant Mountains range, in the fields of environmental sciences, geography and geosciences, humanities and social sciences.

Mainly Czech and Polish scientists contribute; articles are in Czech, Polish or English. The journal also covers the Czech Krkonoše National Park and Polish Karkonosze National Park.

The name Corcontica refers to the Corconti, who lived in the Giant Mountains range, known also as the Riesengebirge, Krkonoše and Karkonosze.

- ISSN 0139-925X (print)
- ISSN 1803-1412 (on-line)
