= Giant Mountains =

Czech and Polish mountain range

- Polish: Karkonosze; Czech: Krkonoše
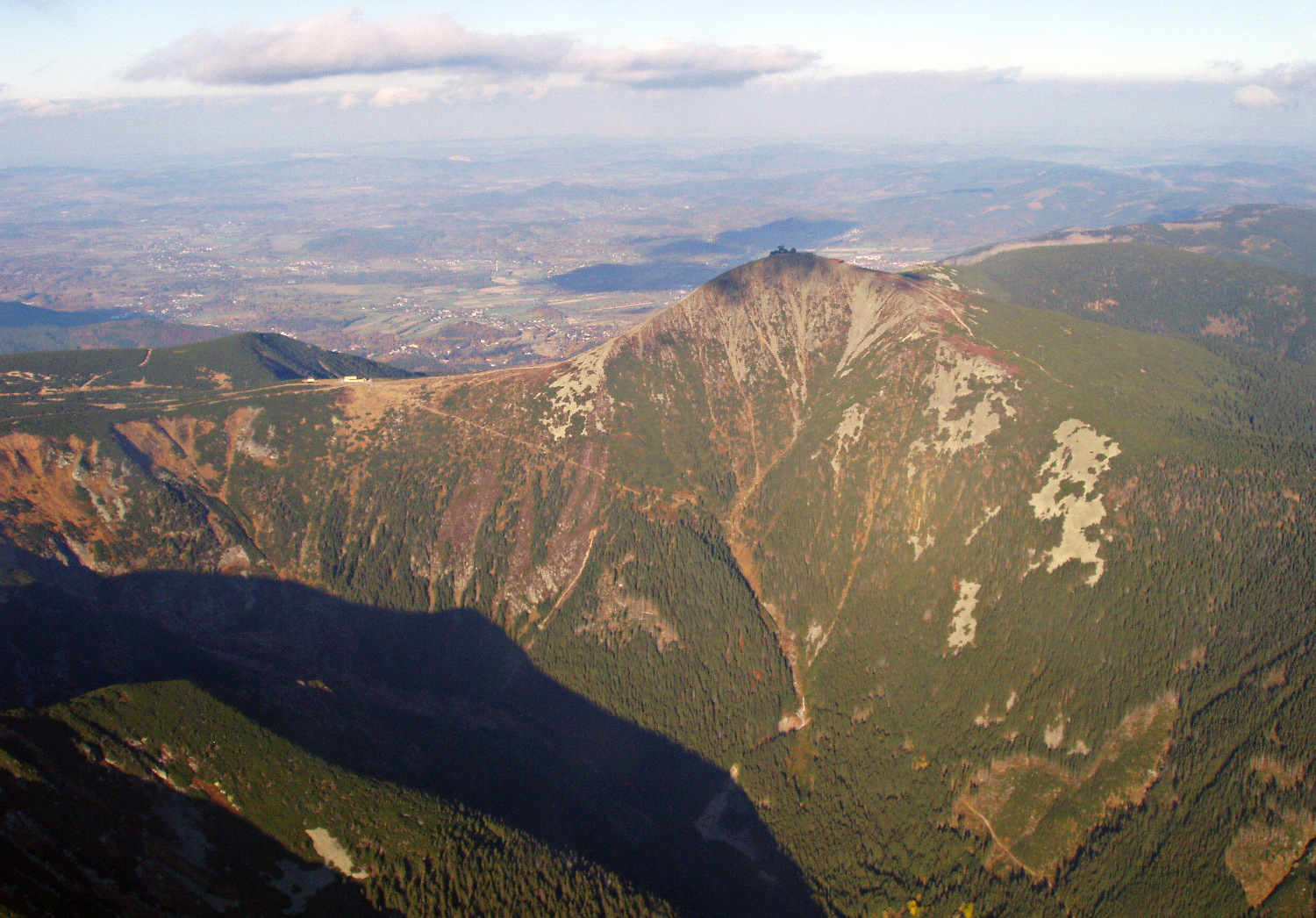
- Sněžka – the highest peak of the Giant Mountains

Highest point
- Peak: Sněžka / Śnieżka
- Elevation: 1,603 m (5,259 ft)
- Coordinates: 50°44′10″N 15°44′25″E

Naming
- Etymology: "Giant"+"Mountains" (see Names)

Geography
- Countries: Czech Republic and Poland
- Regions, Voivodeship: Liberec, Hradec Králové and Lower Silesian
- Subdivisions: Western Giant Mountains, Eastern Giant Mountains, Wielki Staw and Mały Staw
- Rivers: Elbe, Jizera, Úpa, Mumlava, Bóbr and Kamienna
- Range coordinates: 50°46′N 15°37′E
- Borders on: Jizera Mountains and Rudawy Janowickie

Geology
- Orogenies: Caledonian orogeny; Variscan; Alpine orogeny
- Rock ages: Neoproterozoic and Paleozoic
- Rock types: granite; schist; shale; limestone

The Giant Mountains (Czech: Krkonoše, pronounced [ˈkr̩konoʃɛ];; Polish: Karkonosze [karkɔˈnɔʂɛ]) (Note: German: Riesengebirge [ˈʁiːzn̩ɡəˌbɪʁɡə]; Silesian: Karkōnōsze) are a mountain range located in the north of the Czech Republic and the south-west of Poland, part of the Sudetes mountain system (part of the Bohemian Massif). The Czech–Polish border, which divides the historic regions of Bohemia and Silesia, runs along the main ridge. The highest peak,Sněžka, Polish: Śnieżka is the Czech Republic's highest natural point with an elevation of 1,603 metres (5,259 ft).

On both sides of the border, large areas of the mountains are designated national parks (Krkonoše National Park in the Czech Republic and Karkonosze National Park in Poland), and these together comprise the Krkonoše/Karkonosze Transboundary Biosphere Reserve under the UNESCO Man and the Biosphere Programme. The source of the River Elbe is within the Giant Mountains. The range has a number of major ski resorts, and is a popular destination for tourists engaging in downhill and cross-country skiing, hiking, cycling and other activities.

== Names ==
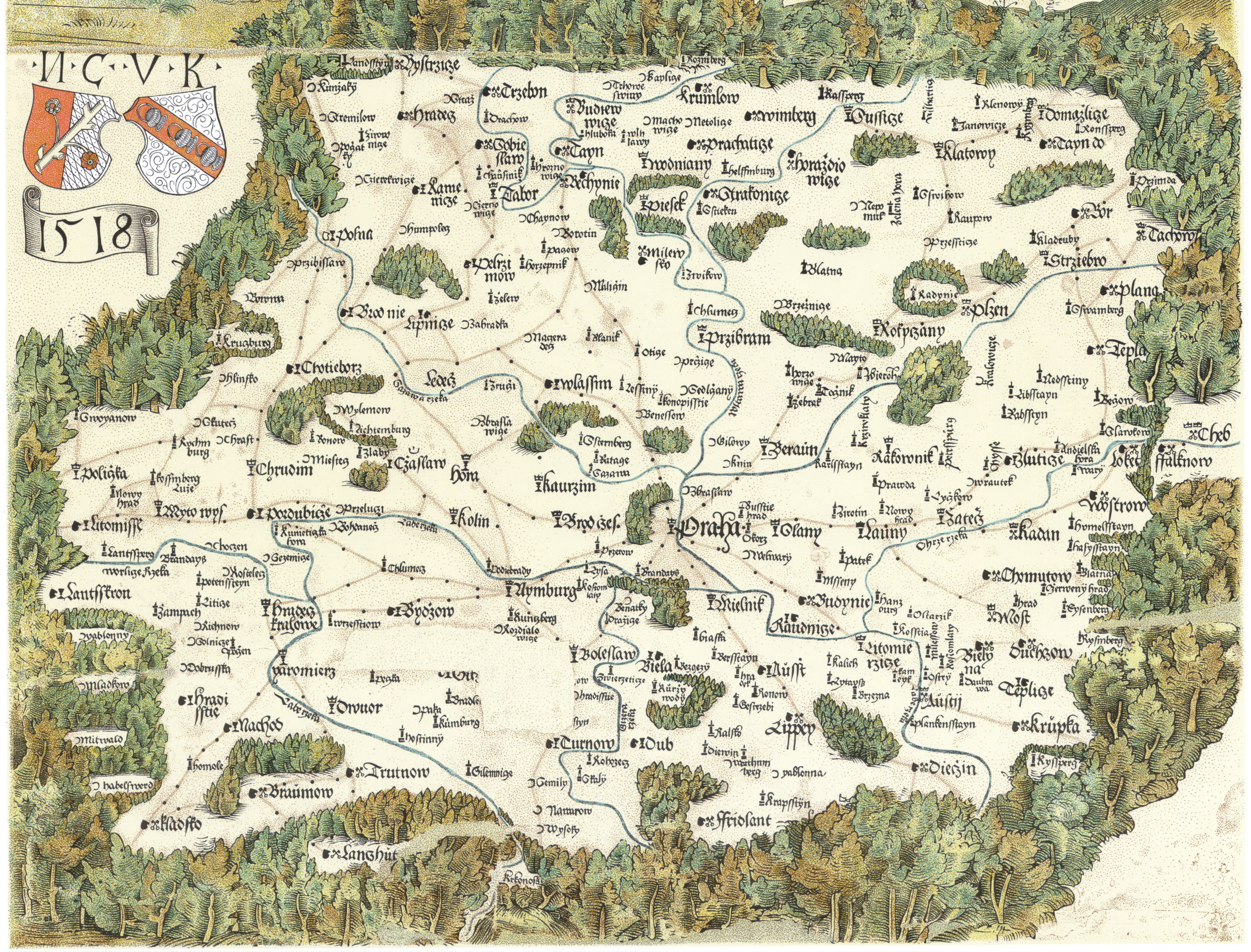
Krkonoss on Klaudyán map of Bohemia, 1518 [near the lower edge (= North) of the image]

The range has been called the Giant Mountains in English literature since at least 1719. The Czech name "Krkonoše" is first mentioned (in the singular, as "Krkonoš") in a 1492 record of the division of the Manor of Štěpanice into two parts. The first map occurrence of the name dates back to 1518 to Klaudyán map of Bohemia, when it is referred to the mountains as "Krkonoss". The origin of the name is usually interpreted as a compound of "krk" or "krak", an Old Slavonic word for Krummholz (a reference to the local vegetation) – and "noš", derived from "nosit" (to carry). Alternative linguistic theories mention a connection with the pre–Indo-European word Corconti, which is first listed by Ptolemy.

In Simon Hüttel's chronicle of Trautenau (Trutnov) from 1549 the names Hrisenpergisches Gebirge, Hrisengepirge, Hrisengebirge, Risengepirge appeared for the first time, but in the following centuries several other names were still used too. Martin Helwig's map of Silesia mentions Riſenberg (Risenberg).

In 1380, Přibík Pulkava called the mountains the Sněžné hory (Snowy Mountains). The Czech writer Bohuslav Balbín recorded in 1679 that the mountains were known under various names: Krkonoše (Cerconossios), Rhipaeos Montes, Obrovski Mountains, Snow Mountains or Riesen Gebirge. The highest peak in the mountain is Śnieżka which means the „Snowy Mountain” in feminine singular.

The modern names of Krkonoše (Czech), and Karkonosze (Polish) became widely accepted in the 19th century.

== Geography ==
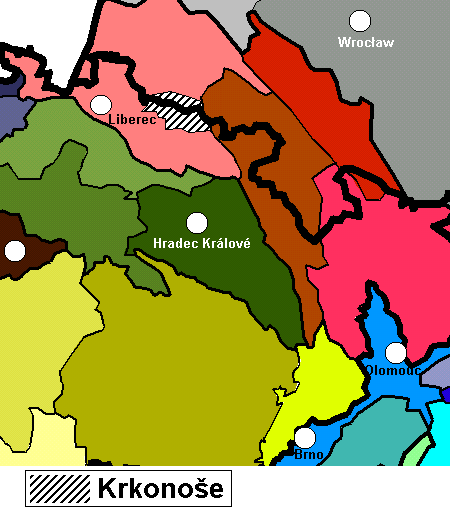
The Giant Mountains within the geomorphological division of the northern Czech Republic.

The area of the Giant Mountains amounts to 631 square kilometres (244 square miles), 454 square kilometres (175 square miles) within the Czech Republic and 177 square kilometres (68 square miles) in Poland. While most of the Sudetes are middle-sized Mittelgebirge mountains, the Giant Mountains have a few characteristics of proper high mountains such as glacial cirques, small periglacial landforms and an elevation significantly above the tree line.

The main ridge of the mountains runs from east to west and forms the border between these two countries. Its highest peak, Sněžka/Śnieżka, is the highest peak of the Czech Republic. The Silesian northern part, in Poland, drops steeply to the Jelenia Góra valley, whereas the southern Czech part slopes gently to the Bohemian basin. In the north-easterly direction the Giant Mountains continue to Rudawy Janowickie, and in the south-east to Rýchory. The pass Novosvětský průsmyk (Polish: Przełęcz Szklarska) at Jakuszyce forms the western border with the Jizera Mountains.

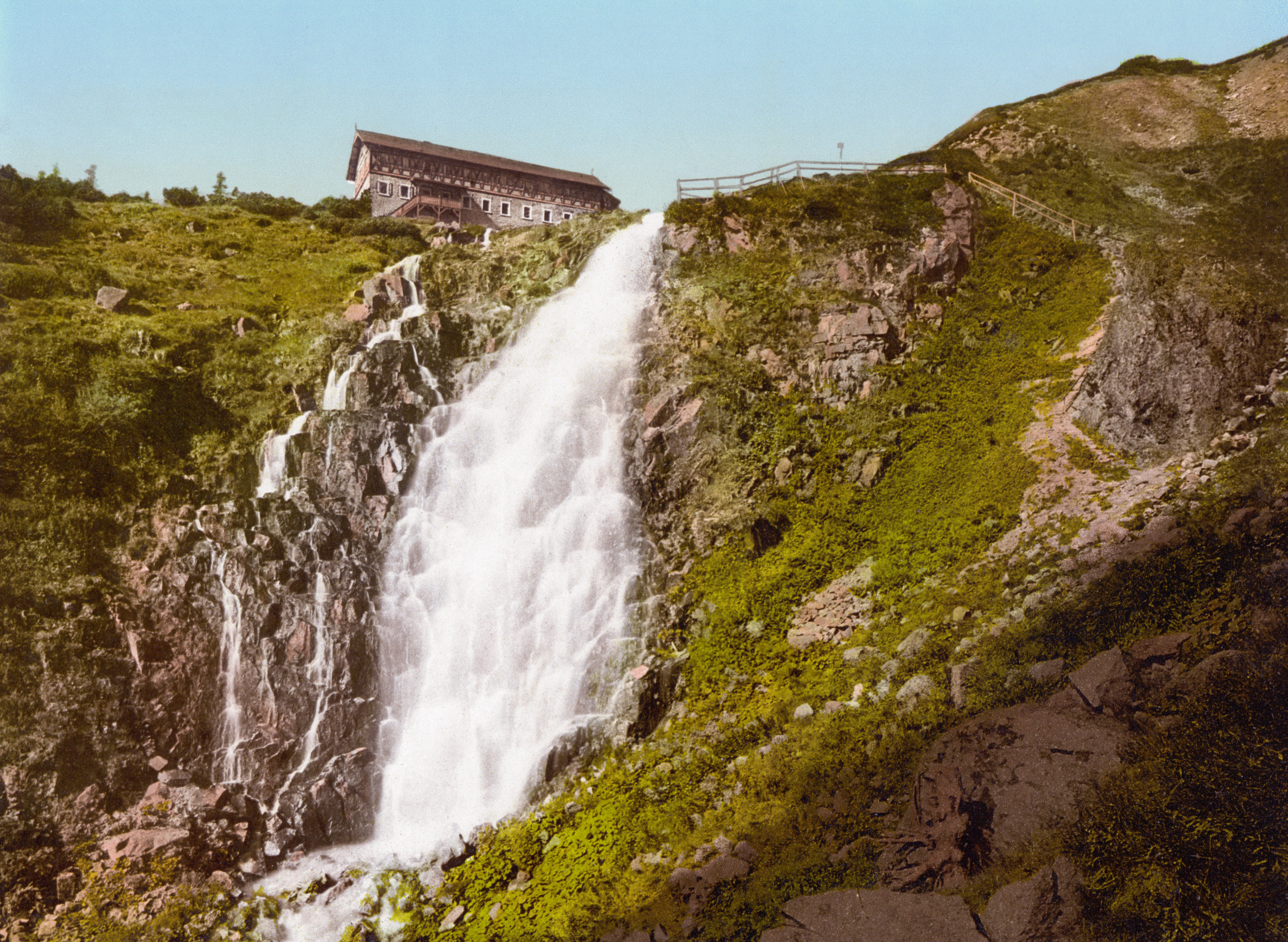
Labský vodopád of the Elbe River and an old mountain hut, 1900

The Bohemian ridge in the Czech Republic, running parallel to the main ridge, forms a second ridge (also called inner ridge). At Špindlerův Mlýn the river Elbe divides the Bohemian ridge.

The ridges are divided by the rivers Elbe, Mumlava, Bílé Labe, Velka Úpa, Malá Úpa and Jizera, which originates in the Jizera Mountains. The rivers on the Czech side often fall over steep edges into valleys formed by ice-age glaciers. The largest waterfalls on the southern side of the mountains are the Labský vodopád with a height of 50 metres (160 feet), Pančavský waterfall (140 metres (460 feet), the highest waterfall in the Czech Republic), Horní Úpský waterfall, Dolní Úpský waterfall and Mumlava Waterfall (8.9 metres or 29 feet). The most important rivers on the Polish side are Kamienna, Łomnica and Bóbr. They also form impressive waterfalls, such as Kamieńczyk Falls (27 metres or 89 feet), Szklarki Falls (13.3 metres or 44 feet) Wodospad na Łomnicy (10 m or 33 ft) or Podgórna Falls (10 m or 33 ft).

The main ridge of the Giant Mountains forms the watershed between the North Sea and the Baltic. The rivers on the south side drain into the North Sea, those on the north side into the Baltic.

== Highest peaks and peaks of interest ==
Czech	Polish	German	Elevation	Note
Sněžka	Śnieżka	Schneekoppe	1,603 m (5,259 ft)	Highest peak; cabin lift from Pec pod Sněžkou
Luční hora	Łączna Góra	Hochwiesenberg	1,555 m (5,102 ft)	Highest peak of the Bohemian Ridge
Studniční hora	Studzienna Góra	Brunnberg	1,554 m (5,098 ft)	
Vysoké kolo	Wielki Szyszak	Hohes Rad	1,509 m (4,951 ft)	Highest peak in the Western Krkonoše
Stříbrný hřbet	Smogornia	Mittagsberg	1,489 m (4,885 ft)	
Violík (Labský štít)	Łabski Szczyt	Veilchenstein	1,472 m (4,829 ft)	
Malý Šišák	Mały Szyszak	Kleine Sturmhaube	1,440 m (4,720 ft)	
Kotel	Kocioł	Kesselkoppe	1,435 m (4,708 ft)	
Velký Šišák (Smělec)	Śmielec	Große Sturmhaube	1,424 m (4,672 ft)	
Harrachovy kameny	Harrachowskie Kamienie	Harrachsteine	1,421 m (4,662 ft)	
Mužské kameny	Czeskie Kamienie	Mannsteine	1,416 m (4,646 ft)	
Dívčí kameny	Śląskie Kamienie	Mädelsteine	1,414 m (4,639 ft)	
Svorová hora	Czarna Kopa	Schwarze Koppe	1,411 m (4,629 ft)	
Růžová hora	Rózowa Góra	Rosenberg	1,390 m (4,560 ft)	
Kopa	Kopa	Kleine Koppe	1,377 m (4,518 ft)	
Liščí hora	Lisia Góra	Fuchsberg	1,363 m (4,472 ft)	
Jínonoš	Szrenica	Reifträger	1,362 m (4,469 ft)	Chairlift from Szklarska Poręba
Lysá hora	Łysa Góra	Kahler Berg	1,344 m (4,409 ft)	Chairlift from Rokytnice nad Jizerou, ski resort
Stoh	Stóg	Heuschober	1,315 m (4,314 ft)	
Černá hora	Czarna Góra	Schwarzenberg	1,299 m (4,262 ft)	Cable car from Janské Lázně, TV tower, ski resort
Medvědín	Medwiedin	Schüsselberg	1,235 m (4,052 ft)	Chairlift from Špindlerův Mlýn, ski resort
Dvorský les	Dworski Las	Hoflbusch	1,036 m (3,399 ft)	Highest peak of Rýchory
Čertova hora	Czarcia Góra	Teufelsberg	1,021 m (3,350 ft)	Chairlifts from Harrachov and Rýžoviště, ski resort

== Flora ==
The river valleys and lower layers form the sub-montane zone. The aboriginal hardwood and mixed forests are largely replaced with spruce monocultures. Only the river valleys offer remnants of hardwood forests.

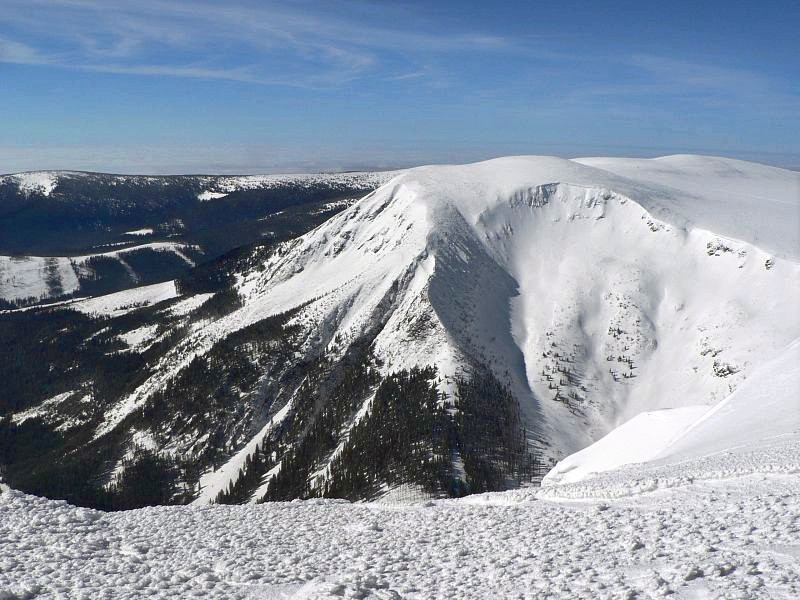
View from Sněžka

The higher parts form the montane vegetation zone. Their natural coniferous forests have also in large parts been replaced by spruce monocultures, which are often heavily damaged due to air pollution and soil acidification. In many places, the forest is dead. This is due to the geographic location in the Black Triangle, a region around the German–Polish–Czech border triangle with many coal-burning power plants. The sulfur dioxide emissions, which are mainly responsible for acid rain, and the emission of many other concentrations have been greatly reduced since the beginning of the 1990s, but the forest die-back, which started in the 1970s and culminated in the late 1980s, could not be stopped entirely.

The clearing of forests in the surroundings of mountain huts created species-rich mountain meadows, which were maintained in alpine pasture farming. After the expulsion of Germans in 1945, this type of management largely came to a standstill and the mountain meadows were largely abandoned.

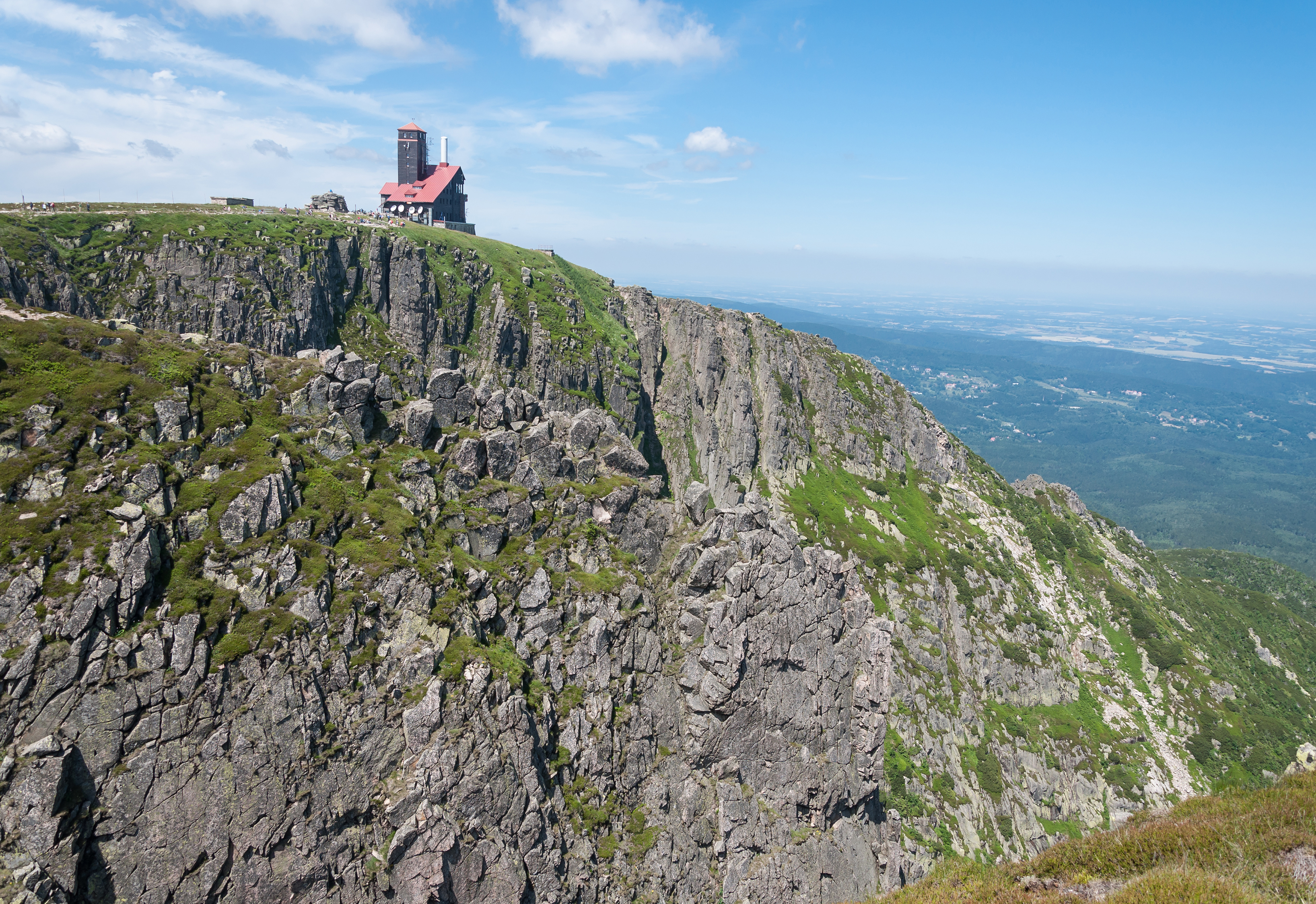
Śnieżne Kotły

Above the timber line at about 1,250 to 1,350 m (4,100 to 4,430 ft) is the subalpine vegetation zone, which is marked by knee timber, mat-grass meadows and subarctic high moors. This habitat of special importance in the Krkonoše is a relic of Arctic tundra, which was typical in Central Europe during the ice age. At the same time, however, there was a connection to the alpine grasslands of the Alps, and plant species coexist here which are otherwise separated by several thousand kilometers, such as cloudberries. Some species evolved under the specific conditions of the Krkonoše unlike in the Alps or in the tundra, especially in Śnieżne Kotły. They are endemic, which means they only appear here.

The alpine vegetation zone, with large rocky deserts, can only be found on the highest peaks (Sněžka, Luční hora, Studniční hora, Kotel and Szrenica). Only grass, moss and lichen survive here.

Especially species-rich are glacial cirques such as the Obří důl, Labský důl and Důl Bílého Labe on the south side and the dramatic Śnieżne Kotły, Kocioł Łomniczki and the calderas of mountain lakes Wielki Staw and Mały Staw on the north side of the main ridge. The species-richest areas are called zahrádka ("garden"). There are about 15 in Krkonoše, for example Čertova zahrádka und Krakonošova zahrádka.

== National parks and nature reserves ==
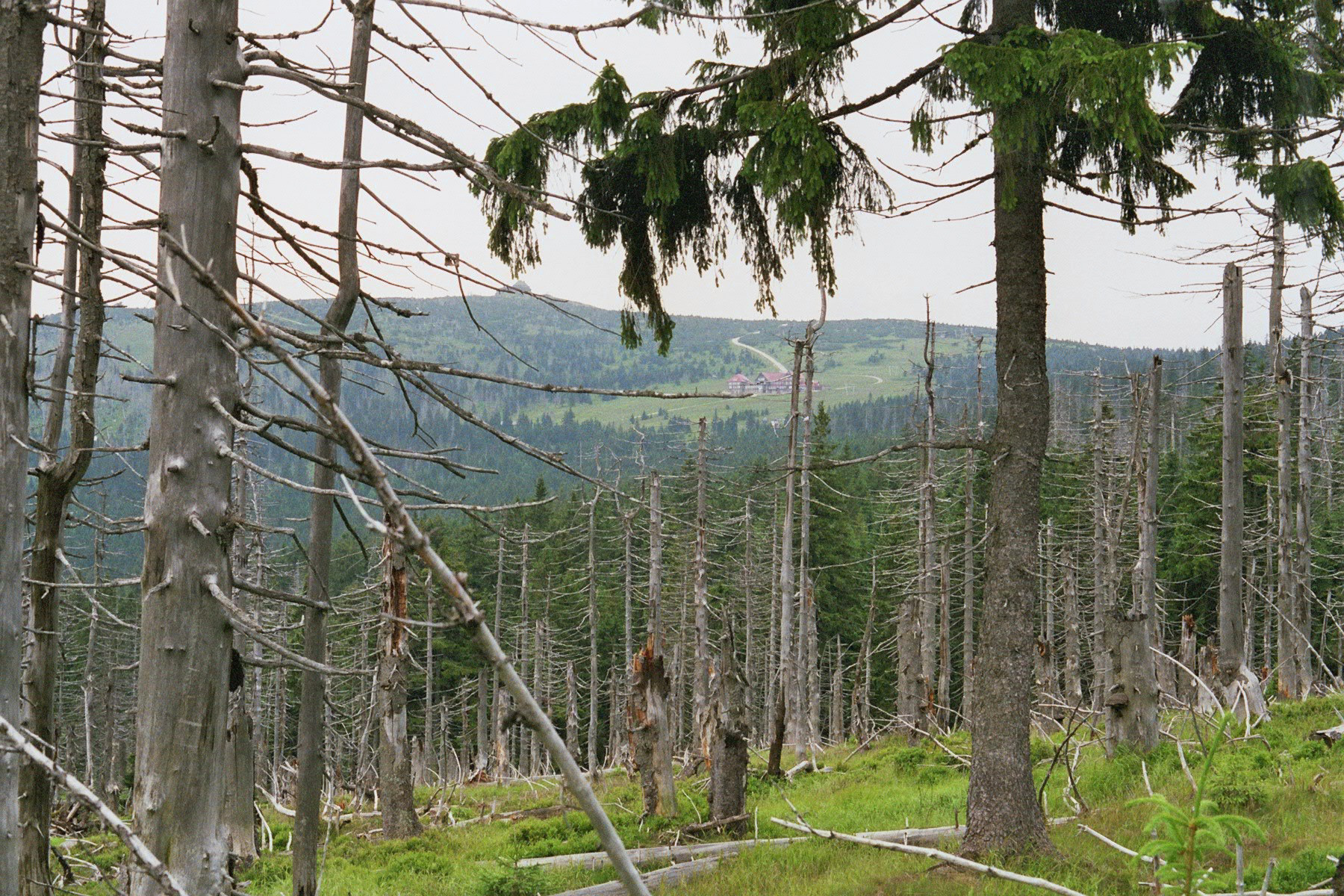
Dead spruces on the northern, Polish side of the range

On both the Czech and Polish side, large parts of the mountain range are protected as national parks and nature reserves.

The Czech Krkonoše National Park (Krkonošský národní park, KRNAP) was created in 1963 as the second national park in Czechoslovakia, making it the oldest national park in the Czech Republic. Its area is approximately 370 square kilometres (140 sq mi), including not only the subalpine zone but also large parts down to the foot of the mountains.

Poland's Karkonosze National Park (Karkonoski Park Narodowy, KPN) was created in 1959 and covers an area of 55.8 square kilometres (21.5 square miles). It covers the highly sensitive higher parts of the mountain range from an altitude of about 900 to 1,000 metres (3,000 to 3,300 feet) and some special nature reserves below this zone.

The strict conservation regulations of the Polish national park prohibit reforestation of damaged and dead forests. On the Czech side, however, large-scale reforestation projects are common.

== Climate ==
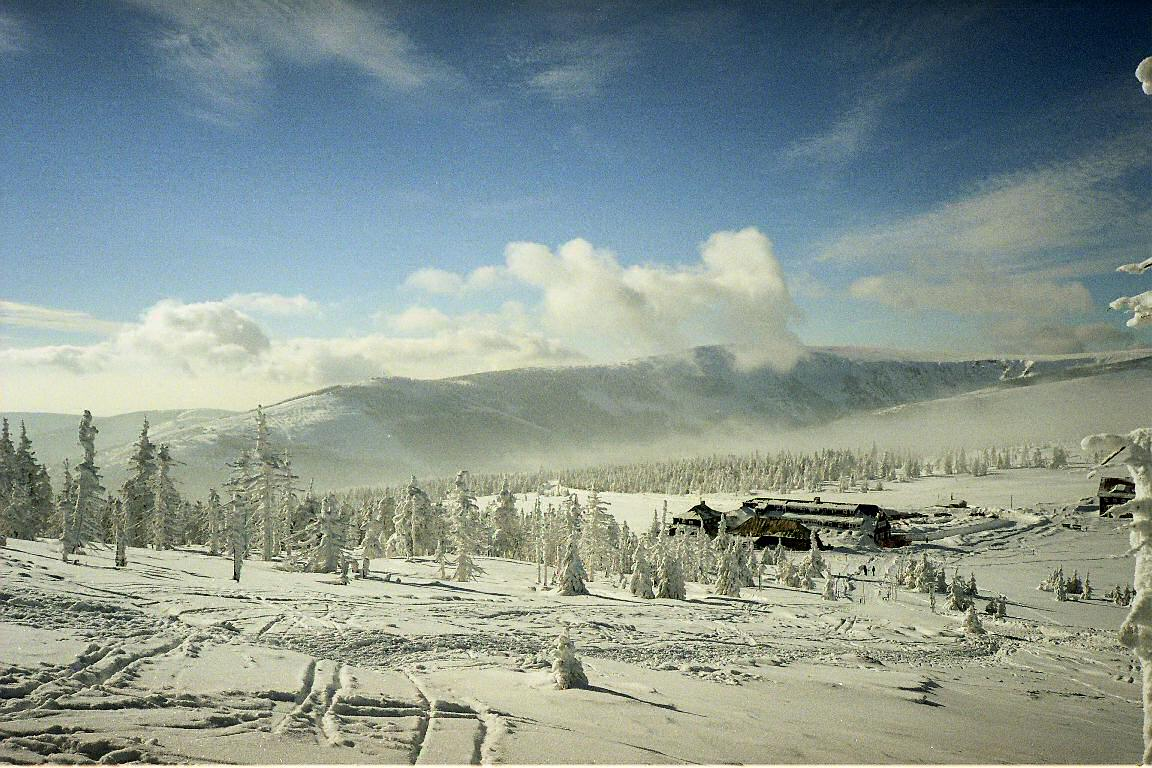
View from the main ridge towards the Bohemian ridge

The climate of the Giant Mountains is marked by frequent weather changes. The winters are cold and snow depths above 3 metres (9.8 feet) are not uncommon. Many parts of the mountains are covered with snow for five or six months. There is often dense fog at the higher altitudes. On average, mount Sněžka/Śnieżka is at least partly hidden in fog and/or clouds on 296 days, and has an average of about 0.2 °C, which is similar to places much further north, like Iceland. The main ridge is one of the most wind-exposed areas of Europe. On the northern side the Foehn wind is a frequent meteorological phenomenon. The annual precipitation ranges from about 700 millimetres (28 inches) at the foot of the mountains up to 1,230 millimetres (48 inches) on mount Sněžka/Śnieżka. The highest precipitation, at 1,512 mm (59.5 in), is reached in the snow pits in the valleys at the foot of the main ridge.

== History ==
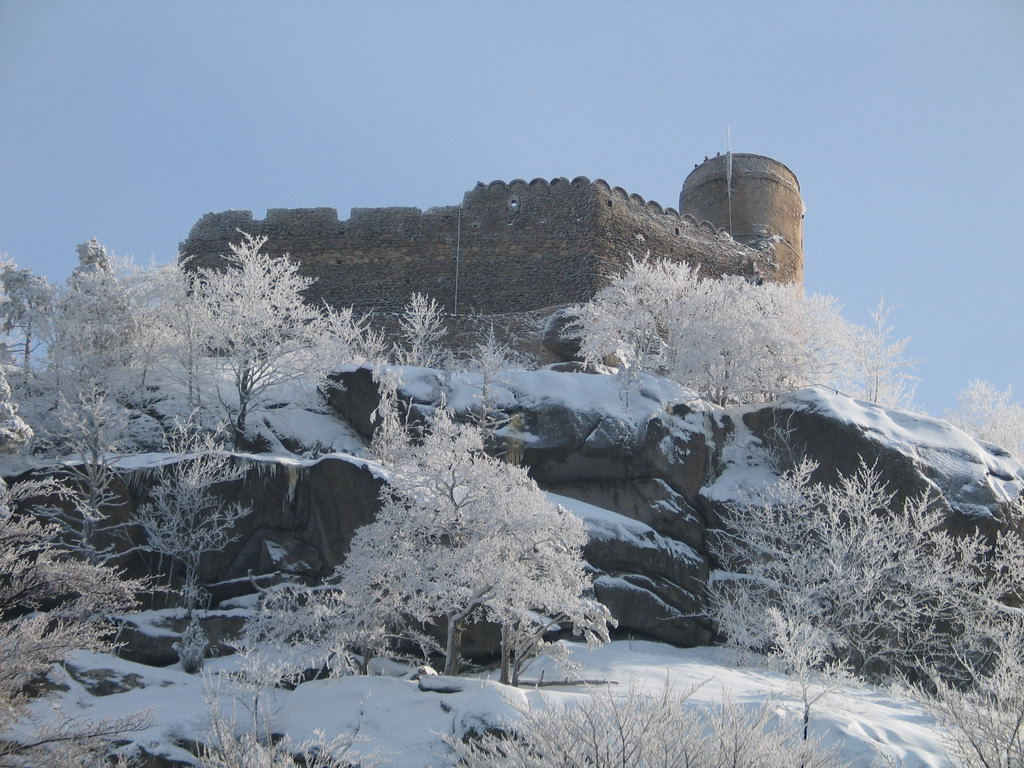
Chojnik castle, Poland

Since the Middle Ages, a state border has been established in the Giant Mountains, first between Poland and Bohemia, then between the Polish Duchy of Jawor and Bohemia, between Prussia and Austria, between Germany and Czechoslovakia, between Poland and Czechoslovakia, and then between Poland and the Czech Republic. Apart from minor adjustments, the boundary has survived unchanged to this day. It is disputed whether the Polish ruler Bolesław III Wrymouth crossed the Giant Mountains during his reprisal campaign against Bohemia in 1110. Until the establishment of Poland in the 10th-11th century the mountain range and its foothills were unpopulated, with deep, impenetrable forests. The Polish part was administratively part of the Wleń castellany. The first traces of human settlements probably appeared in the Duchy of Bohemia near two provincial paths between Bohemia and Poland in the 12th century. The town of Jelenia Góra and probably also Kowary existed nearby already in the 12th century, however, the oldest villages on the foothills on the Polish side were founded in the 13th century. Among the first native inhabitants were wood cutters, charcoal burners and hunters, and the first immigrants were gold prospectors.

The first wave of colonization by Czech settlers in the Bohemian part goes back to the 13th century, but only includes the foothills; the mountain ridges were still unpopulated. The second wave of colonization of the foothills in the late 13th century was mostly by German settlers (Ostsiedlung); they first colonized the Polish (Silesian) northern part, where farming conditions were better, and later the southern Bohemian part along the Elbe and Úpa rivers. Many agricultural settlements, markets and handcraft communities and cities were founded at that time, and they formed a base for the further colonization of the mountain range.

In 1281, Duke Bernard the Lightsome granted the western portion of the Giant Mountains to the Knights Hospitaller from Strzegom, and in 1292, Duke Bolko I the Strict granted the Grzbiet Lasocki in the east to the Krzeszów Abbey, whereas the remainder of the Polish part of the mountains remained a ducal possession, but there were some small noble possessions.

The first people who explored the inner parts of the Giant Mountains were treasure hunters and miners looking for gold, silver, ores and valuable stones, mainly on the Silesian side. In the 14th and 15th centuries foreigners who spoke a non-German language came to the mountains. They were called "Wallen" (see Walha), and their journeys to the "treasure" deposits were recorded in so-called "Wallenbüchern" (Wallen books). Mysterious orientation signs from these "Wallen" are visible to this day, especially on the northern side of the mountains.

In the 14th–16th centuries, miners, glassmakers, charcoal burners, woodcutters and shepherds settled in the mountains. The first glassworks reportedly was established in the Cicha Dolina ("Silent Valley") at the foot of the Grzybowiec mountain on the Polish side already in the 13th century, yet it certainly operated in the 14th–16th centuries. In the mid-14th century, there were also glassworks in Szklarska Poręba and Vysoké nad Jizerou. Later on, glassworkers from Bohemia also moved to the Silesian part of the mountains.

In 1511 German miners from the region around Meissen in Saxony started working in Obří Důl, directly below mount Sněžka/Śnieżka, and at the same time many other mines were opened in other central parts of the mountains, like Svatý Petr, now part of Špindlerův Mlýn.

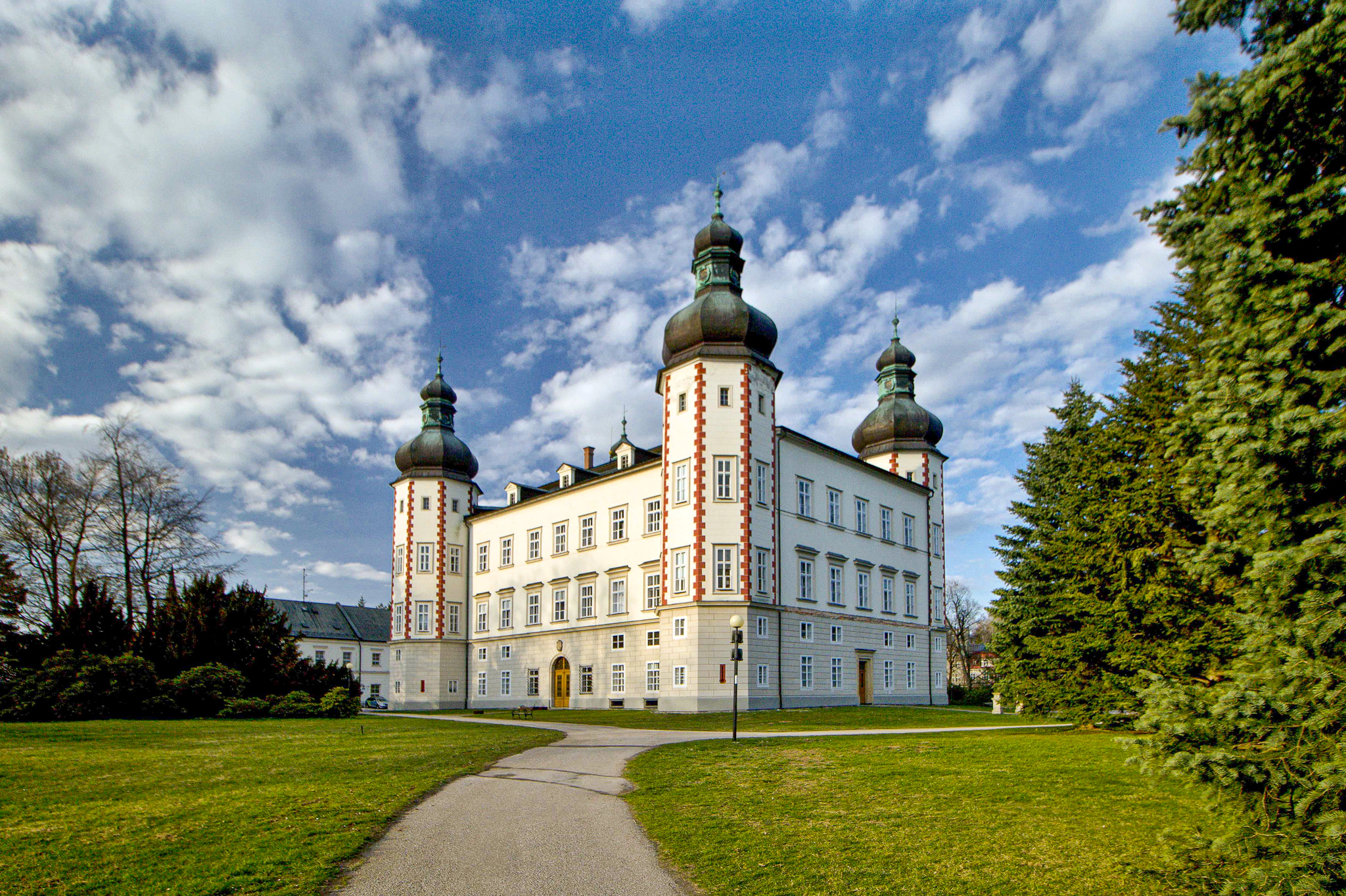
Vrchlabí Castle built by Christoph von Gendorf in 1545–1546

In the 1530s, Christoph von Gendorf, a Carinthian aristocrat and royal senior captain of King Ferdinand I, appeared in the Krkonoše and obtained the entire dominion of Vrchlabí (Hohenelbe, High Elbe). His enterprising spirit was crucial for the further development of the area. For the supplement of the miners he founded many smaller towns in higher parts of the mountains. Further down in the valleys iron work furnaces were built, and water wheels provided the energy required. Due to the intensive economic activity the first deforested enclaves on hillsides and on the peaks appeared during this period.

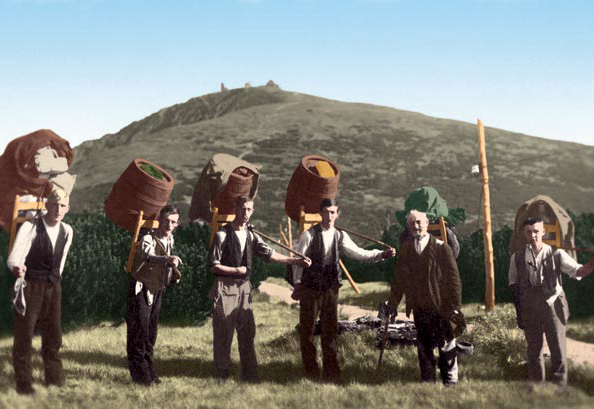
Koppenträger, who in former times supplied the mountain huts during most of the year. The picture shows members of the Hofer and Mitlöhner families, two long-established dynasties from the eastern part of the Bohemian side of the mountains. The ancestors of both families came from Austria in the 16th century.

By order of Christoph von Gendorf, widespread timber cutting for the silver mine in Kutná Hora started in many places, which caused irreparable damage. These orders led to the third wave of colonization, which fully affected the mountain ridges. In 1566 he invited lumberjacks from Alpine countries to settle in his domain. These people from Tyrol, Carinthia and Styria changed the character of the mountains and shaped the cultural landscape significantly. Hundreds of families, especially from the Tyrol region, created another group of inhabitants who spoke a different German dialect and brought another domestic culture to the Krkonoše. On the mountain hillsides they founded new settlements, laid down the basis for later farming by breeding cattle and built wooden dams to retain the water.

In the 17th century Albrecht von Wallenstein acquired parts of the mountains, and the town of Vrchlabí served as a base for armament of his army. The Thirty Years' War of 1618–1648 sparked further exploration and settlement of the Giant Mountains, as the inhabitants, fleeing from the armies, took refuge in the mountains, sometimes founding new villages. Religious refugees from the Bohemian part fled to the Silesian part of the mountains, where they settled in Marysin (present-day district of Szklarska Poręba), Karpacz, Borowice, Michałowice (present-day district of Piechowice) and Jagniątków (present-day district of Jelenia Góra). Following the war, several cottages, called bouda (plural: boudy) in Czech, buda (plural: budy) in Polish and Baude (plural: Bauden) in German, remained in the higher parts of the mountains, which were used during the cattle pasturage in the summer and sometimes even through the winter. Among the oldest are Luční bouda, Stara Śląska Buda at Łabski Szczyt, Pomezní bouda and Brádlerova bouda founded in the 1620s and 1630s. The entire mountain range became a densely populated region.

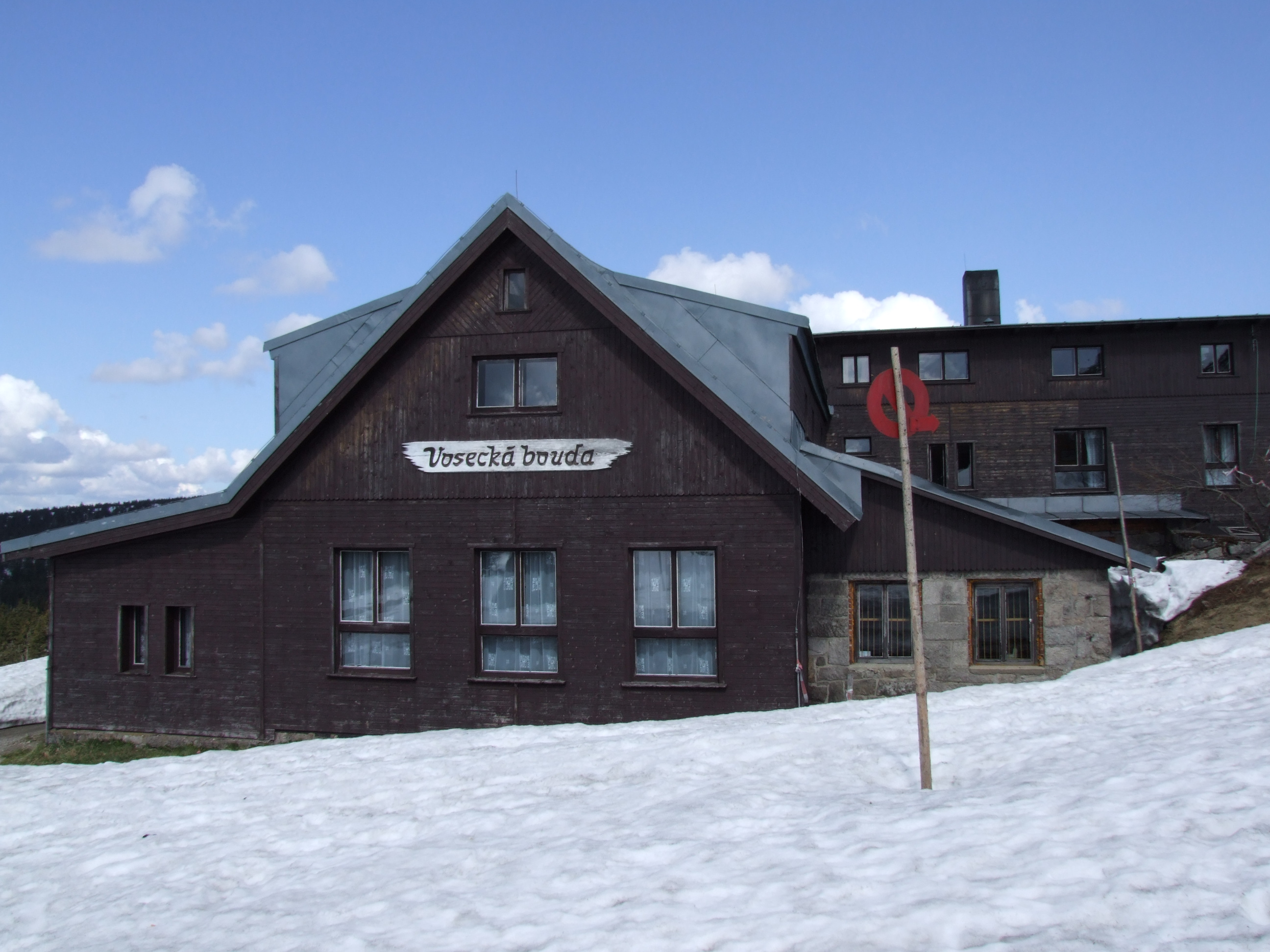
Vosecká bouda, one of the few huts managed by Czechs after 1918

During the 17th century the mountain range on the Bohemian side was divided among new landowners, most of them Catholics and foreign to the region. These included the families of Harrach, Morzin and de Waggi. Disputes about the borders of each domain soon followed, but were settled between 1790 and 1810. Since the Treaty of Berlin (1742) Silesia had become part of the Kingdom of Prussia. The court decision of 1790, which set the border between the Bohemian dominions and the Silesian Schaffgotsch dominions (which family owned the Silesian part of the mountains, as well as large estates in the Jelenia Góra Valley north of them since the Middle Ages), defines the border between Bohemia and Silesia to this day.

At first Bad Warmbrunn (Cieplice Śląskie Zdrój, now a district of Jelenia Góra) with its hot springs became a popular bath and tourist centre on the northern side of the mountains. In 1822 Wilhelm, a brother of Prussian king Frederick William III, was the first prince of the Hohenzollern dynasty who took his summer residence in the Hirschberg (Jelenia Góra) valley, at Fischbach (today Karpniki) castle. In 1831 the king himself bought Erdmannsdorf Estate, which he had learned to appreciate when visiting his brother in Fischbach and the previous owner of Erdmannsdorf, field marshal August von Gneisenau. The valley became a princely hideaway, and in 1838 the king purchased nearby Schildau Castle (today Wojanów) for his daughter Louise, Princess of the Netherlands. Frederick William IV enlarged the Erdmannsdorf manor house. Many new parks were created and manors and palaces rebuilt according to the newest architectural styles.

In 1918 the Republic of Czechoslovakia was founded, and in the following years there was an influx of Czechs on the Bohemian side of the mountains. Usually these people worked for the government (in contrast to the German inhabitants they spoke both Czech and German, which was required), but some of them also worked in the tourism industry and managed mountain huts like Labská bouda and Vosecká bouda. Many of these mountain huts had previously been owned by aristocratic landowners, but were given to the Czech Tourist Club after the Land Control Act. This influx was stopped when the Czechoslovak side of the mountains was occupied by Germany in 1938, and many of these Czechs left the region or were expelled.

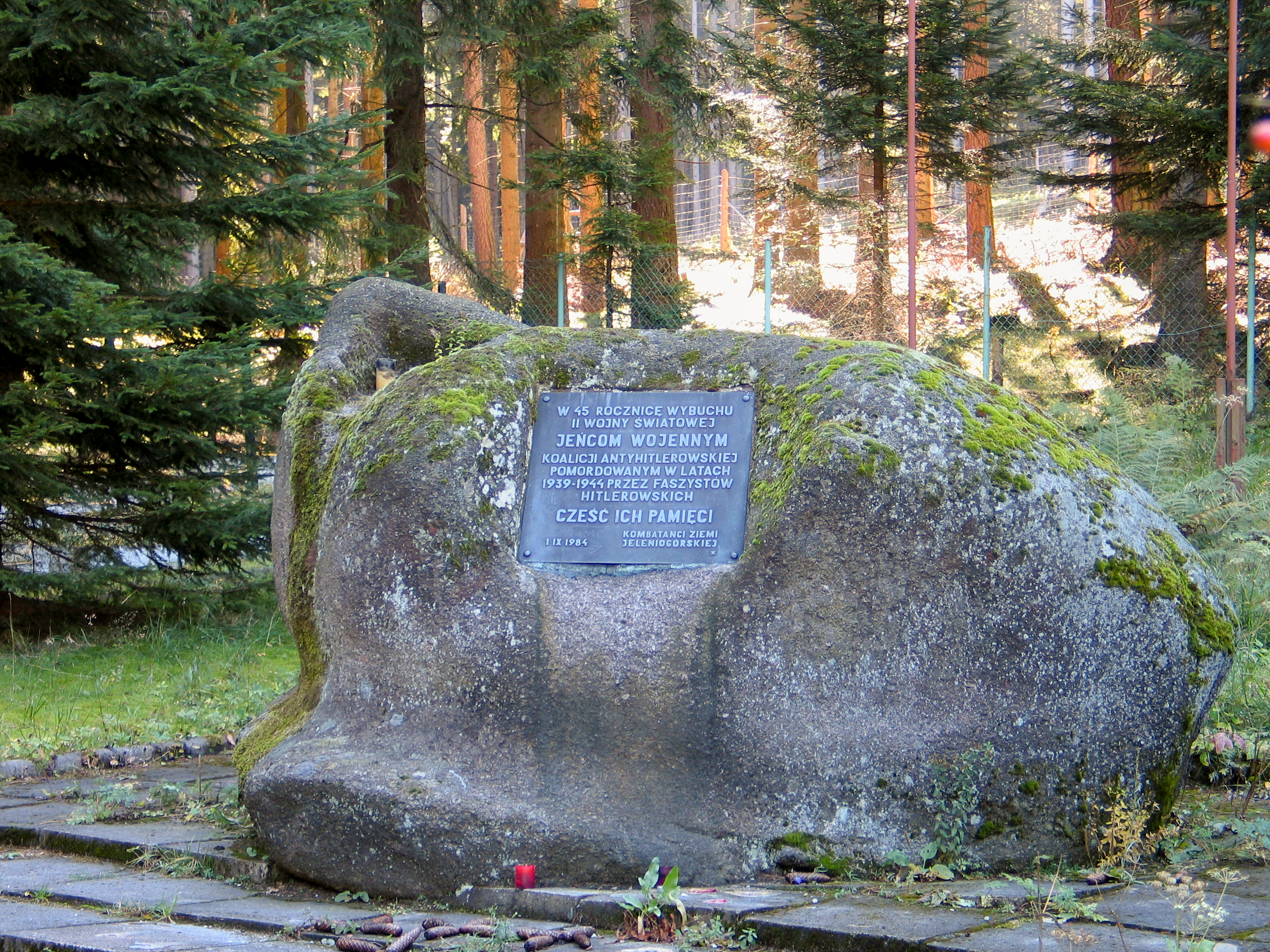
Memorial in Borowice, dedicated to Allied POWs killed by Nazi Germany

There was no fighting in the Giant Mountains during World War II, and the Germans occupied the mountain huts as military observation posts, communication posts and resorts for troops. The Germans operated at least 15 forced labour camps, located in Przesieka, Przełęcz Karkonoska, Piechowice, Kowary and Krzaczyna. The camps held prisoners of various nationalities, including Polish (often women and sometimes even children), Italian, French, Jewish, Czech, Belgian, Luxembourgish, Ukrainian and Russian. Belgian, French and Soviet prisoners of war, and possibly also Czech and Polish civilians, were used to build a road connecting the village of Borowice with Przełęcz Karkonoska, now known as Droga Borowicka ("Borowice Road"). Poor sanitary and feeding conditions resulted in a high mortality rate, and after a typhus epidemic broke out in 1942 the construction was halted.

After the defeat of Germany in the war, the mountains became again part Czechoslovakia and Poland, although with Soviet-installed communist regimes, which stayed in power until the 1980s. Almost the entire German population was expelled in accordance with the Potsdam Agreement. On the northern Silesian side, Poles, some of whom had been expelled from what was formerly eastern Poland resettled the area, while Czechs re-settled the southern Bohemian side of the mountain range. Today the population density of the area of the national park is two-thirds lower than before World War II, as it is a protected area, and many houses are only used at weekends, for recreational purposes. The population exchange also led to a decline of the cultural landscape. In large parts of the mountains the meadows ran to seed, settlements deracinated, hundreds of traditional houses and mountain huts decayed or turned into architecturally worthless objects and countless memorials, chapels, shrines, landmarks and springs were destroyed, because they were either German-related or ecclesiastic. New Polish names were issued by political decree in the Polish northern Giant Mountains.

In the 1970s and 1980s, Polish and Czech anti-communist activists met illegally in the Giant Mountains. Following the Fall of Communism, presidents of Czechoslovakia and Poland met at the Przełęcz Karkonoska in 1990.

== Mountain huts and rock formations ==
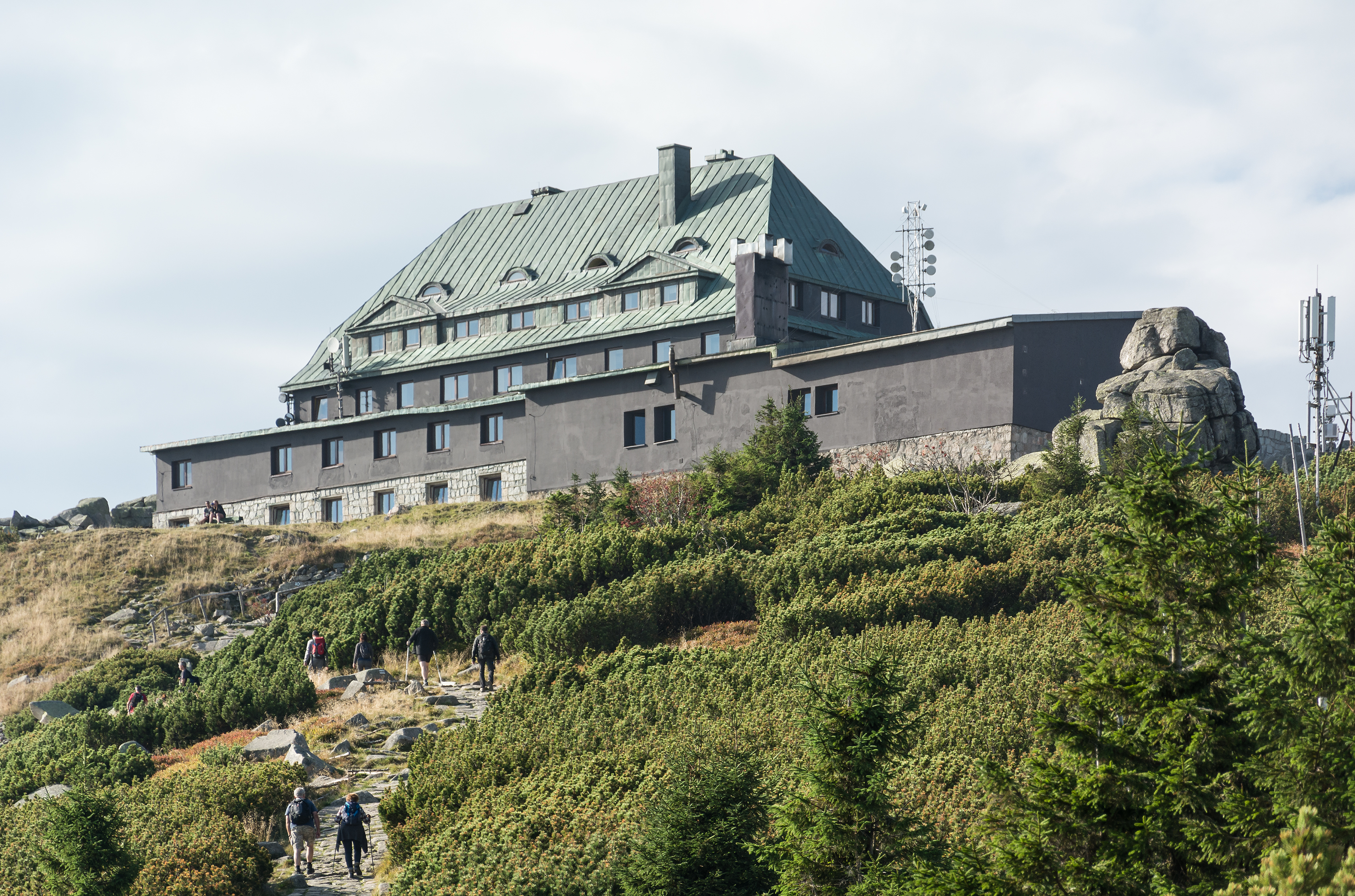
Mountain hut on Szrenica in Poland

Typical for the Giant Mountains are its numerous mountain huts, which are called bouda in Czech and Baude in German. Both names are derived from the Middle High German word Buode, which means booth or building. The Polish name is schronisko. These were mostly named either for the location or for their constructor or occupant. The occupants, however, often changed after the expulsion, and several mountain huts especially on the now Polish side received new names. Entire colonies of mountain huts were called after the families who lived there. They are located in the higher parts or the ridge of the Krkonoše and were used by shepherds as wooden refuges in the summer. After 1800, some of the mountain huts became interesting for the first hikers, and towards the end of the 19th century many were converted into hostels. Later, these huts were often expanded to host a larger number of guests. Well-known historical mountain huts include Luční bouda, Martinova bouda and Vosecká bouda in the Czech Republic and Schronisko Strzecha Akademicka, Schronisko Samotnia and Schronisko na Hali Szrenickiej in Poland. In other places, the old mountain huts were replaced by newer buildings which were specially built for tourism purposes. Huts from the 20th century include Petrova bouda and the hut on the summit of mount Sněžka/Śnieżka.

There are also many impressive rock formations, such as Dívčí kameny-Śląskie Kamienie and Mužské kameny-Czeskie Kamienie, above 1,400 metres (4,600 feet) on the main ridge, Harrachovy kameny on the Czech side, and Pielgrzymy and Słonecznik in Poland. These weathered blocks of granite form high towers which often resemble humans or animals, and reach heights up to 30 metres (98 feet). Similar formations can be found in other parts of the Sudetes.

== Tourism ==
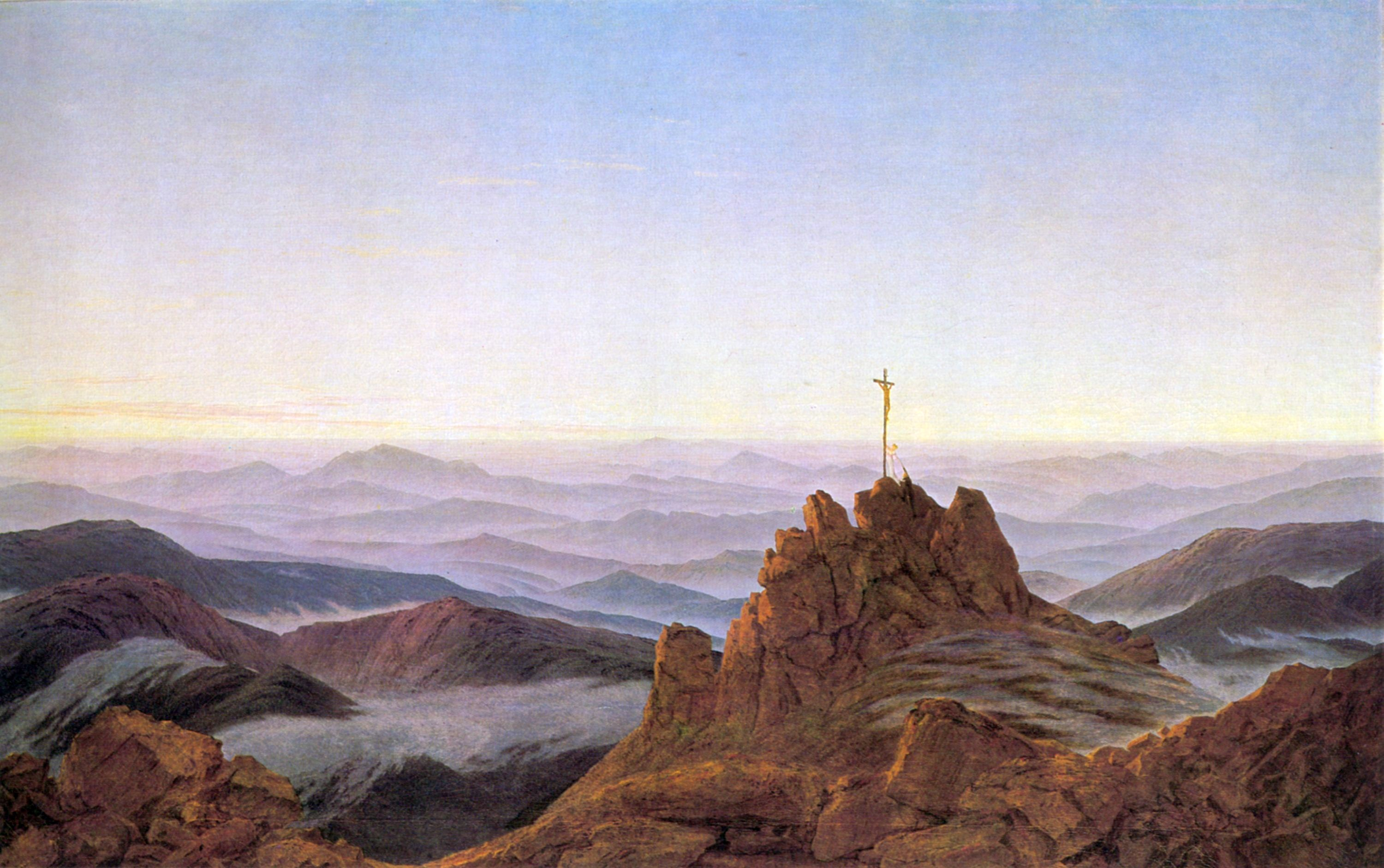
Morning in the Riesengebirge, early 1810s painting by Caspar David Friedrich

The Giant Mountains form one of the most traditional tourist areas in Central Europe. As early as the 18th and 19th centuries, ascents of the Sněžka were common, for instance by Theodor Körner and Johann Wolfgang Goethe. Artists like Caspar David Friedrich and Carl Gustav Carus hiked through the mountains to find inspiration. Future President of the United States John Quincy Adams visited the Giant Mountains in 1800. At the end of the 19th century two mountain clubs were founded, the German Riesengebirgsverein (Giant Mountains Club) on the Silesian side and the Austrian Riesengebirgsverein on the Bohemian side. The touristic development of the Krkonoše was one of their goals, and this primarily meant the construction of hiking trails. In the following years they created a network of 3,000 kilometres (1,900 miles), with 500 kilometres (310 miles) on the Silesian (main) and Bohemian ridge alone.

With the development of settlement and tourism, there have been cases of deaths from falls from heights, straying and freezing or from avalanches. The oldest surviving records of avalanches date back to the 17th century, whereas the oldest surviving monument to a mountain victim is located on Sněžka/Śnieżka and commemorates Jan Pieniążek-Odrowąż who died in 1828. Additionally, in 1968, there was an avalanche in the Biały Jar ravine, which killed 19 people and injured 5 others. A total of 1,100 people took part in the rescue operation.

As a result, the mountains became one of the most popular vacation areas in the German Empire. In the 19th century, the most numerous tourists were Germans and Poles. Polish-language guidebooks to the Giant Mountains have been published since the 18th century, and in the 18th-19th centuries there were also indigenous Polish mountain guides. In the 19th century, many Czech writers visited the mountains and climbed Sněžka, which they then described in their works. Mount Sněžka was a symbol of the Slavic origin of the Czechs and a source of inspiration in the Czech National Revival movement. During the Gründerzeit (19th century period of industrial and economic growth) many manufacturers from Berlin built numerous holiday villas on the Silesian side, many of which are preserved to this day and provide a special flair, as in Szklarska Poręba (formerly Schreiberhau). Direct rail links to Schreiberhau from Berlin, Breslau (Wrocław), Stettin (Szczecin) and Dresden, and later even Deutsche Luft Hansa air links via Hirschberg (Jelenia Góra), enabled a convenient and speedy arrival. On laying out Berlin's Victoria Park on the Kreuzberg between 1888 and 1894 the garden architect Hermann Mächtig designed its waterfall after the Zackelfall (Kamieńczyk Falls) and a gully after Wolfsschlucht (Vlčí rokle in Adršpach).

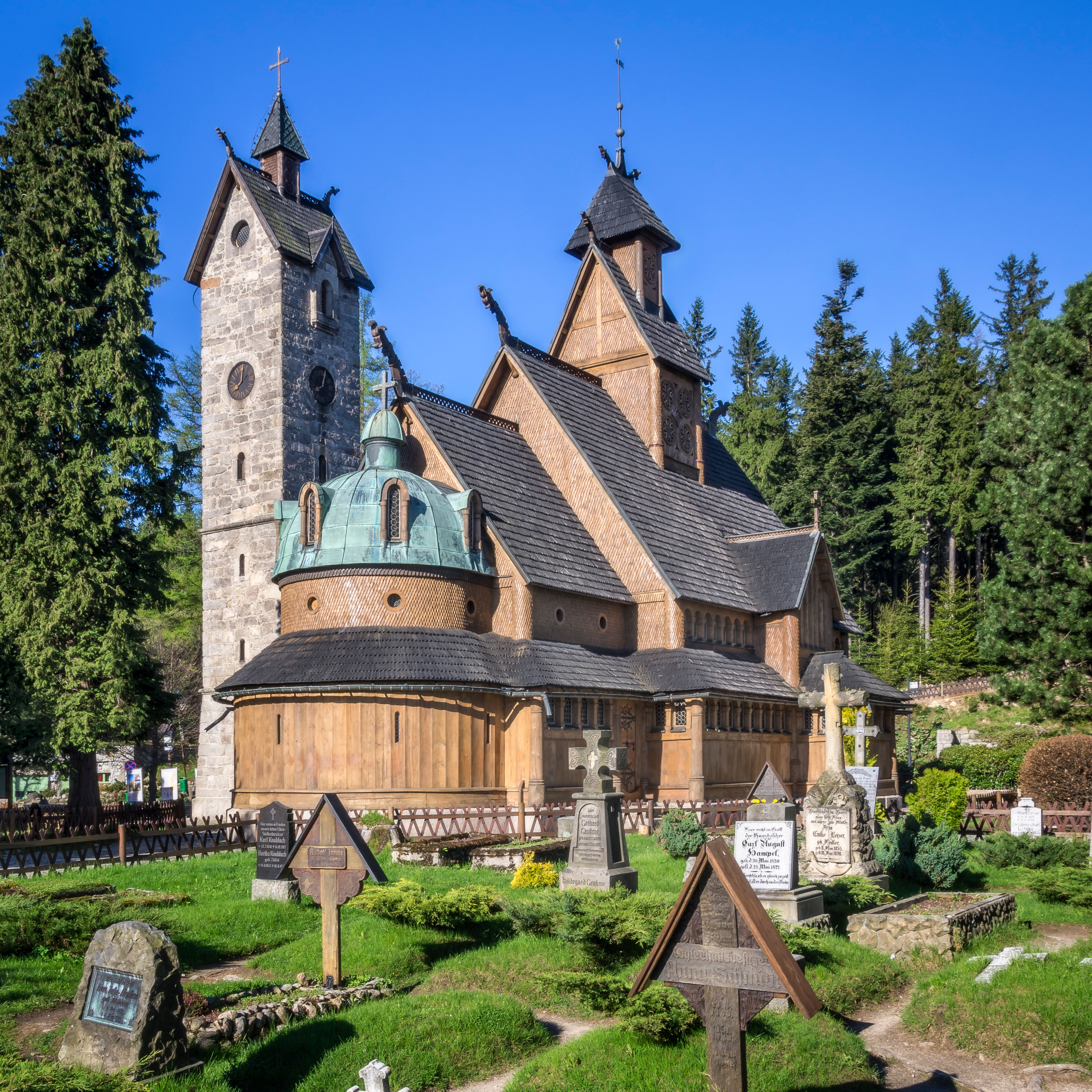
Vang stave church in Karpacz, Poland

After World War II, ski resorts expanded with new lifts and slopes on both sides of the mountains, while the traditional mountain huts were neglected. Many were victims of fires, such as Labská bouda, Riesenbaude, and Prinz-Heinrich-Baude. Similarly many hiking trails, ski jumps and luge tracks fell into disrepair due to lack of care. In 1945, the Polish Dolnośląskie Towarzystwo Turystyczno-Krajoznawcze ("Lower Silesian Tourist and Sightseeing Society") was founded in Przesieka, which was merged with the Polish Tourist and Sightseeing Society the following year. The Polish Tourist and Sightseeing Society re-opened several mountain huts. The cross-border hiking trail on the main ridge called "Polish–Czech Friendship Trail" was closed in the 1980s for all but Polish and Czechoslovak citizens. The mountains are on the route of main Sudetes hiking trail, Główny Szlak Sudecki (440 km from Świeradów Zdrój to Prudnik), which follows the main ridge. Today, the Giant Mountains are a popular holiday destination in both summer and winter.

=== Winter sport ===
The Giant Mountains are a traditional winter sports centre in Central Europe. The largest mountain resorts are located on the Czech side in Pec pod Sněžkou, Špindlerův Mlýn, Harrachov and Janské Lázně and on the Polish side in Szklarska Poręba, Karpacz and Kowary.

August Neidhardt von Gneisenau described a sledging of ten kilometres (6.2 miles) from Grenzbauden (Pomezní boudy) to Schmiedeberg (Kowary) already in 1817. Much earlier however heavy sledges already transported timber and hay whereas smaller and more manoeuvrable sledges, so called "Hitsch'n", were used to get faster from the ridges down into the valleys. Races with both types of sledges were a popular pastime among the locals and became an attraction for tourists. As sledging became more and more popular competitions were organized, the most popular and earliest during the late 19th century in Johannisbad (Janské Lázně). Around 1900, 3,930 sledges with long horn-shaped runners and 6,000 sport sledges were counted on both sides of the mountains.

Nordic skiing was introduced during the same time when in 1880 Dr. Krause from Hirschberg (Jelenia Gora) bought some Norwegian skis in Stettin (Szczecin). A pair of them, the first recorded skis in the Giant Mountains, ended up at the Peterbaude (Petrovka). The locals however didn't know their purpose, and it wasn't until Fridtjof Nansens "Paa ski over Grønland" (The First Crossing of Greenland) was translated into German in 1891 that skiing became popular. At the same year the first ski manufacture of Austria-Hungary was established in Jungbuch (Mladé Buky) by master carpenter Franz Baudisch. The first crossing of the main ridge was done in 1892/93. Skiing as a popular sport was mainly brought forward by forest wardens, teachers and industrialists and business people who provided money to create and maintain the needed infrastructure and sponsored equipment for poorer people and schools.

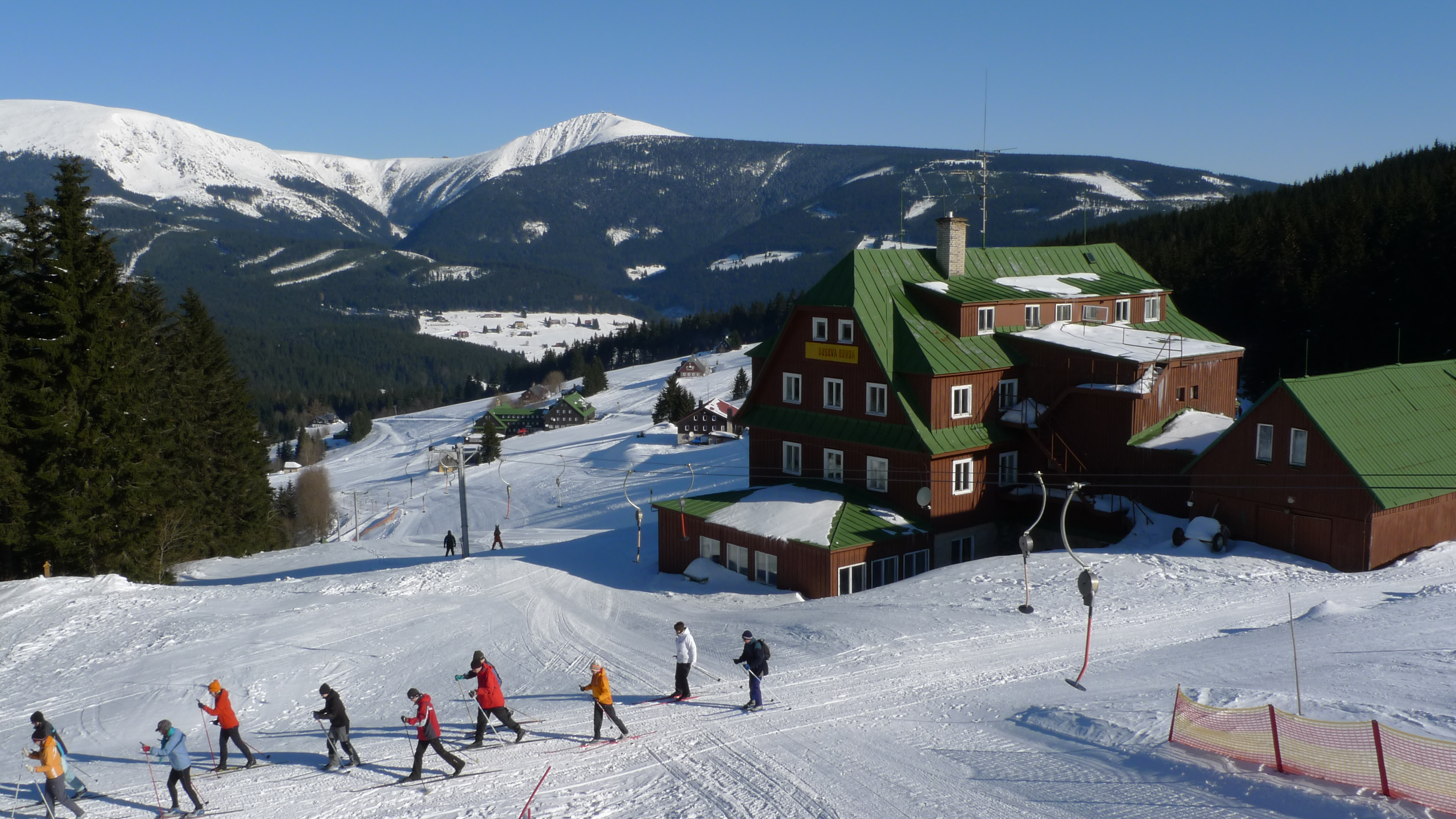
A ski resort in Pec pod Sněžkou

Around 1900 a number of sports clubs were founded in the Giant Mountains. The leading role of the region back then was emphasised by the fact that 5 of the 12 founding clubs of the Austrian Ski Federation (ÖSV) were located in this part of the Bohemia, that the office of the ÖSV was located in Hohenelbe (Vrchlabí) for the first three years (afterwards it moved to Vienna and finally Innsbruck) and that the first president of the ÖSV was Guido Rotter, a local from the mountains. The clubs on the Silesian side were part of the German Ski Association (DSV). After the breakup of Austro-Hungary and the creation of Czechoslovakia the German clubs of the Bohemian side of the Giant mountains joined the newly founded HDW, an association for all German winter sports clubs in Czechoslovakia, whereas the small Czech minority joined the Svaz lyžařů, an association for all Czech winter sports clubs.

The towns and villages of the Giant Mountains became a popular venue for national and international competitions, its athletes ranked among the best of the era. The first German Nordic combined champion was a local, the competition itself was staged in Schreiberhau (Szklarska Poręba). Schreiberhau also hosted several luge championships. Martin Tietze and his sister Friedel from neighbouring Brückenberg (Karpacz) won the European luge championships many times. The first Rendezvous race, predecessor of today's Nordic Ski Championships, was hosted by Johannisbad, the majority of the competitions were won by HDW athletes.

=== Hiking ===
The mountain range is traversed by the cross-border hiking trail along the main ridge called the "Polish–Czech Friendship Trail". The start point is located on Szrenica and the end in the Okraj Pass/Pomezní boudy; the length of the trail is approx. 30 km; the level of difficulty is moderate. The trail partially overlaps with ski trails.

On the mountain is The Meadow hut, the oldest mountain hut on the ridges of the Krkonoše Mountains. In 1625, a farm building (a simple shelter for pilgrims) stood along the Silesian Road, a trade route connecting Bohemia and Silesia.

=== Mountain biking and cycling ===
There are hundreds of kilometres of cycling and cross country roads, natural single tracks and demanding rock garden downhill courses in Karkonosze National Park. Mountain biking trails run across Polish and Czech Republic's borders and are set against forested mountain sides, green pastures, lakes and cold rivers.

== Legend and literature ==
The Giant Mountains is the legendary home of Rübezahl, a half-mischievous, half-friendly goblin of German folklore.

The Giant Mountains provide the setting for Friedrich de la Motte Fouqué's "Der Hirt des Riesengebürgs," or "The Shepherd of the Giant Mountains".

== Important towns ==
- Harrachov, in the Czech Republic
- Karpacz, ski resort in Poland
- Kowary, in Poland
- Janské Lázně, in the Czech Republic
- Pec pod Sněžkou, mountain resort in the Czech Republic
- Szklarska Poręba, ski resort in Poland
- Špindlerův Mlýn, mountain resort in the Czech Republic

== Resources ==
- Opera Corcontica, scientific journal from the Krkonoše National Park

== Gallery ==
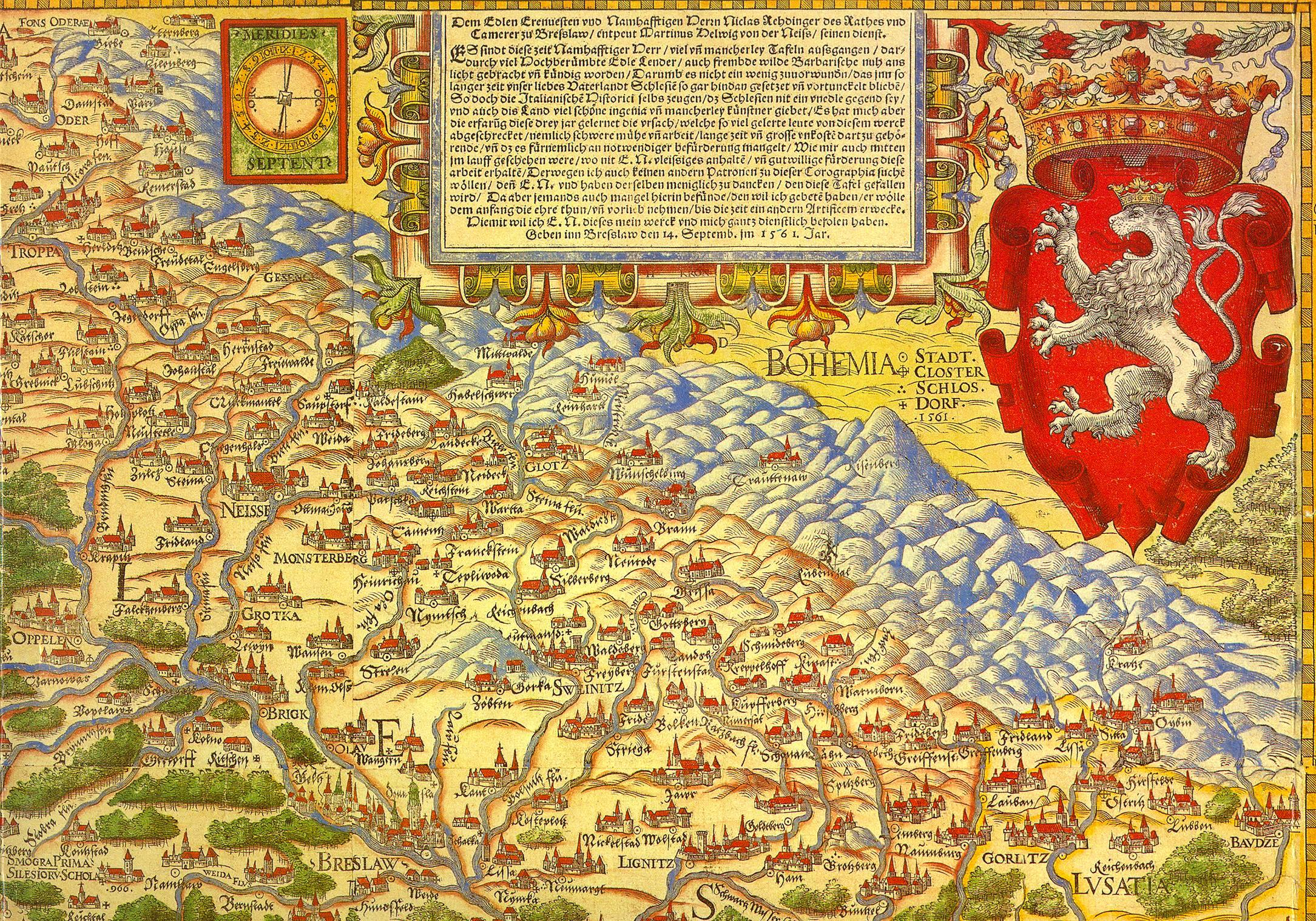
Riſenberg on Martin Helwig's map of Silesia, 1561

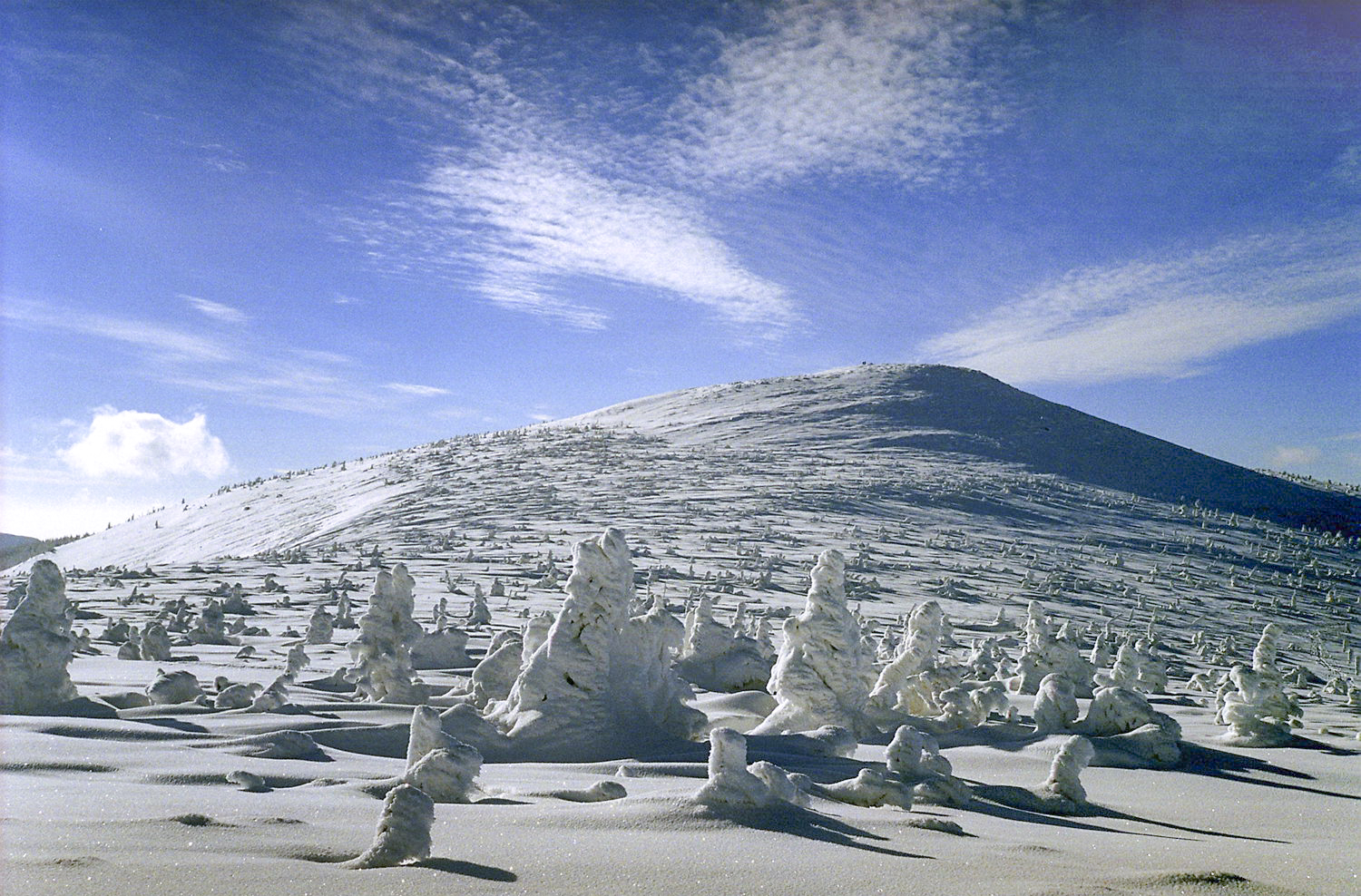
Mały Szyszak, view from Tępy Szczyt

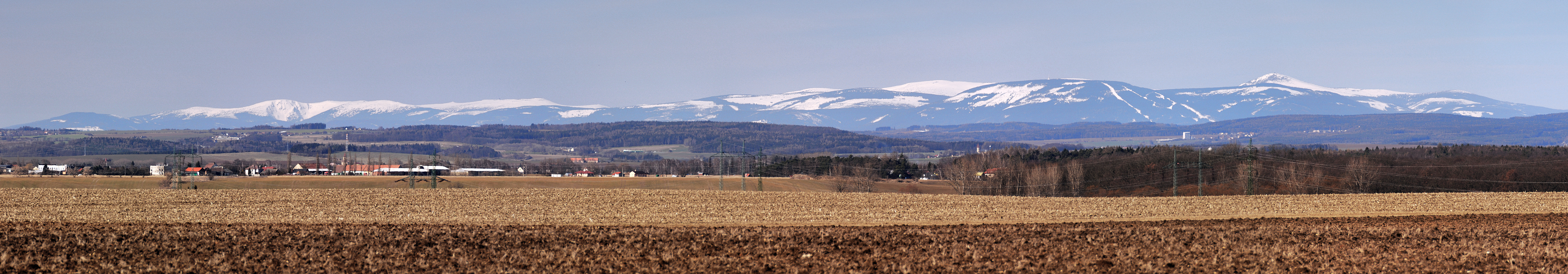
Panorama of the Giant Mountains from the south (from the Czech Republic

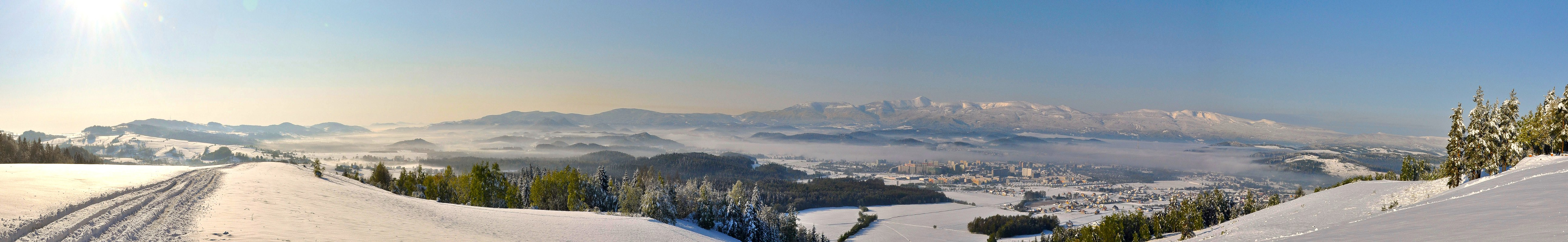
Panorama of Giant Mountains from the north (from Poland) in winter

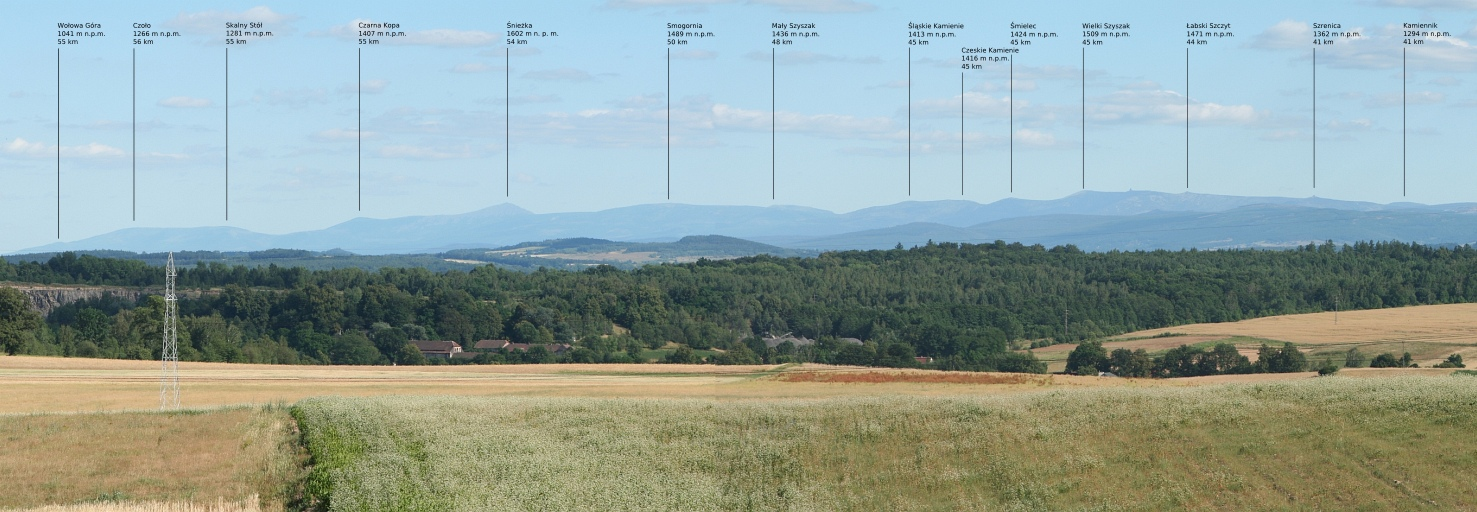
Panorama of Giant Mountains from the north (from Poland) in summer

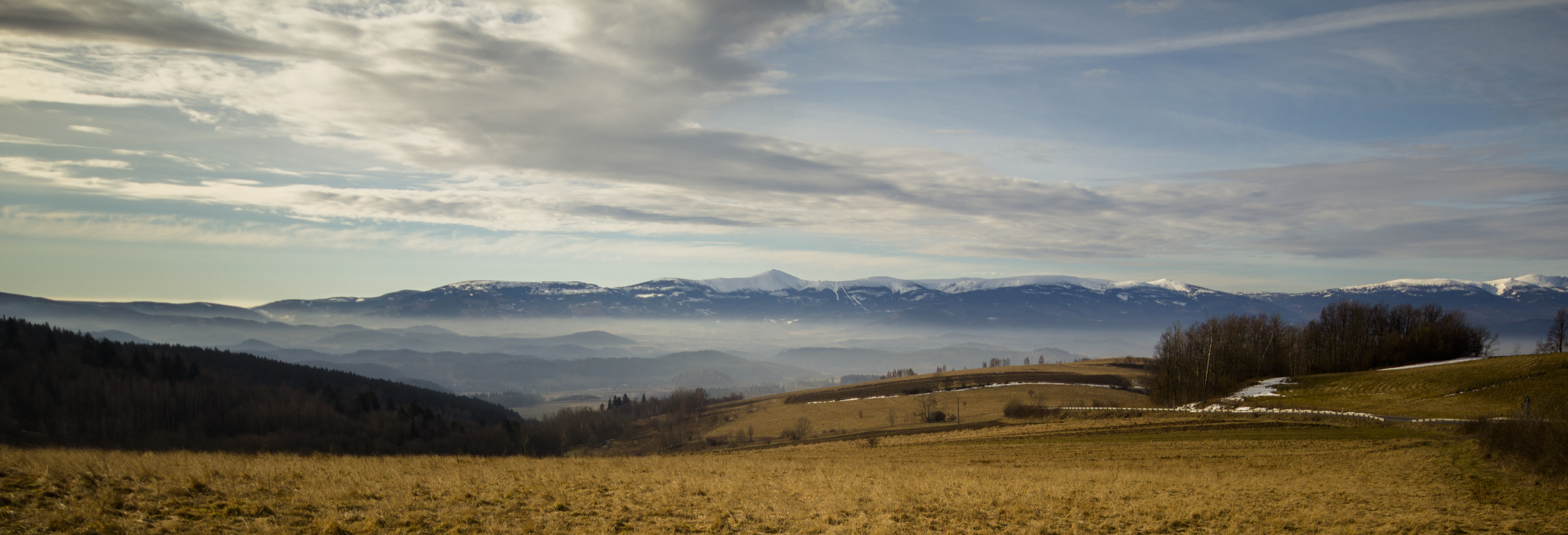
Panorama of Giant Mountains from the north (from Poland) in winter

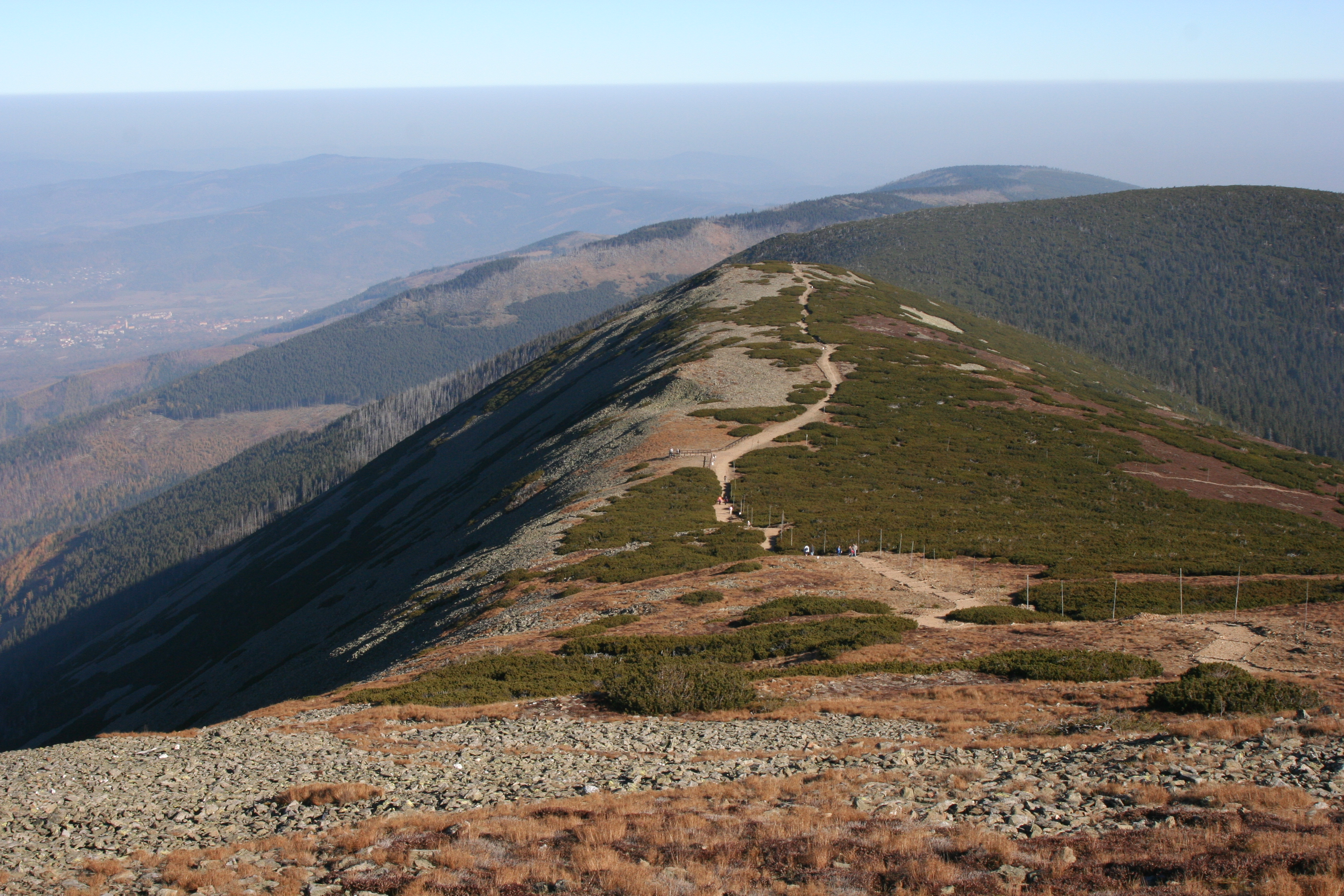
Alpine vegetation zone at the main ridge 1,400 m (4,600 ft)

== See also ==
- Grzbiet Lasocki

== Literature ==
- Nieuwentyt, Dr. The Religious Philosopher tr. by John Chamberlayne. London: Senex.
- Staffa, Marek (2001). Karkonosze (in Polish). Wrocław: Wydawnictwo Dolnośląskie. ISBN 83-7023-560-3.
