= Kamieńczyk Falls =

Waterfall in the Giant Mountains, Poland

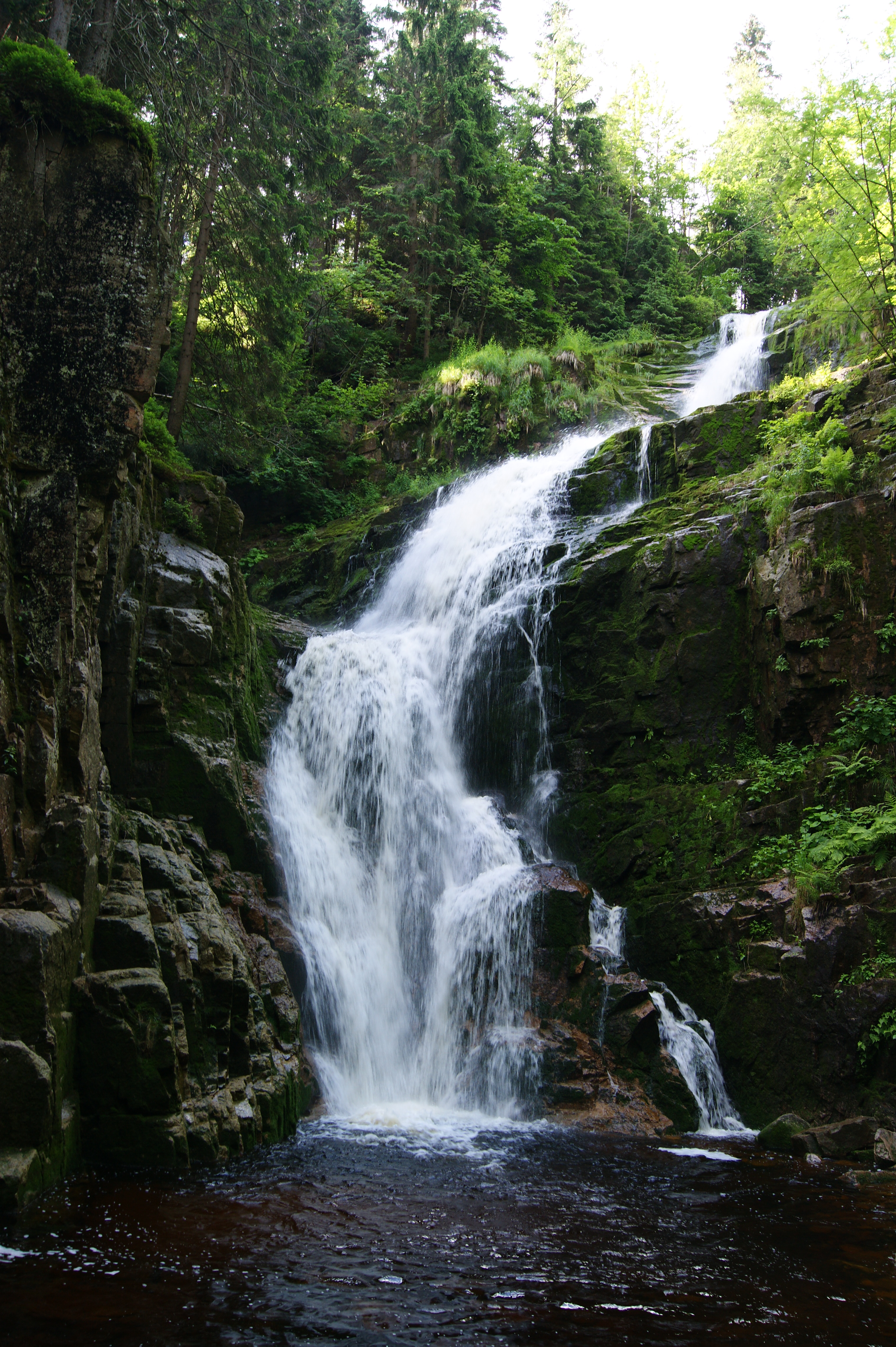
- View of the waterfall
- Interactive map of Kamieńczyk Falls
- Location: Giant Mountains, Poland
- Coordinates: 50.8136114°N 15.4967025°E
- Type: Cascade
- Elevation: 843 m (2,766 ft)
- Total height: 27 m (89 ft)
- Watercourse: Kamieńczyk

Kamieńczyk Falls (pronounced: [kaˈmjɛɲt͡ʂɨk]; Polish: Wodospad Kamieńczyka; German: Zackelfall) is the highest waterfall in the Karkonosze National Park, Lower Silesia, Poland, dropping a total of 27 metres (89 ft). It is located in the Giant Mountains in the south-western part of the country and is ranked as the third highest waterfall in Poland.

== Characteristics ==
Kamieńczyk Falls is situated at 843 metres (2,766 ft) above sea level and consists of three main cascades. A man-made cave carved by Walloons known as Złota Jama (Golden Grotto) is located behind the middle cascade. The waterfall is 27 meters high, making it the country's second highest waterfall. It falls down into the Kamieńczyk Gorge (Polish: Wąwóz Kamieńczyka), which is a 100-meter long canyon. A five-meter deep plunge pool filled with blocks of rock is located at the feet of the waterfall. It can be found along a trail from Szklarska Poręba to Szrenica.

== History and tourism ==
In the 19th century, the waterfall became a tourist attraction following a growth of popularity of hillwalking. In 1800, John Quincy Adams, future President of the United States, visited the waterfall as part of his extended tour of Silesia. Princess Izabela Czartoryska was among other notable visitors of the site in this period. German garden architect Hermann Mächtig designed the waterfall when laying out Berlin's Victoria Park on the Kreuzberg between 1888 and 1894 inspired by the Kamieńczyk Falls (then known as Zackelfall). In 1890, the Karkonosze Society officially granted access to the waterfall to visitors. Due to repeated accidents, a protective net was installed on the route to the falls, which prevented rocks from falling on the visitors.

In order to visit the waterfall, tourists need to pay an admission fee. Visiting is permitted only in specified hours. Each visitor receives a safety helmet before entering the gorge leading to the waterfall. Two mountain shelters are located near the waterfall: "Kamieńczyk" and "Szałas Sielanka".

The waterfall was featured in Andrew Adamson's 2008 fantasy film The Chronicles of Narnia: Prince Caspian.

== Legend ==
A local legend has it that the water flowing in the waterfall contains the tears of seven rusalkas grieving over the death of one of them named Łabudka, who died by falling into a precipice while searching for her beloved Kamieńczyk Bronisz. Łabudka had been warned by her sisters to stay away from the human, however, she wouldn't listen to them. She handed him her precious jewels, which he intended to sell in order to obtain money to help his ill mother. When her lover did not return, she went out from Łabski Szczyt looking for him. Unfortunately, when she saw Kamieńczyk, she slipped and fell down a precipice to her death.

== Gallery ==
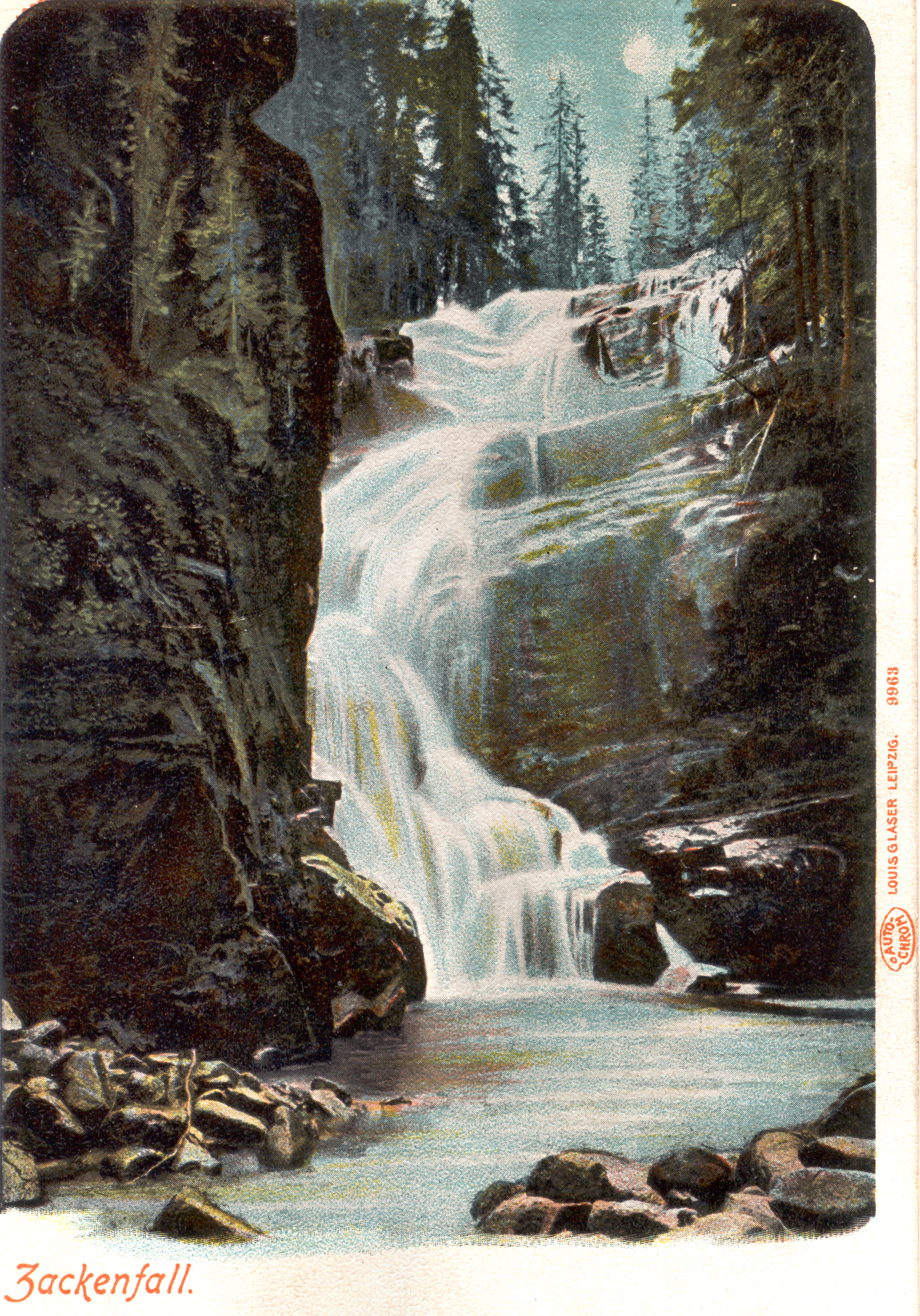
An early 20th-century German postcard featuring the waterfall

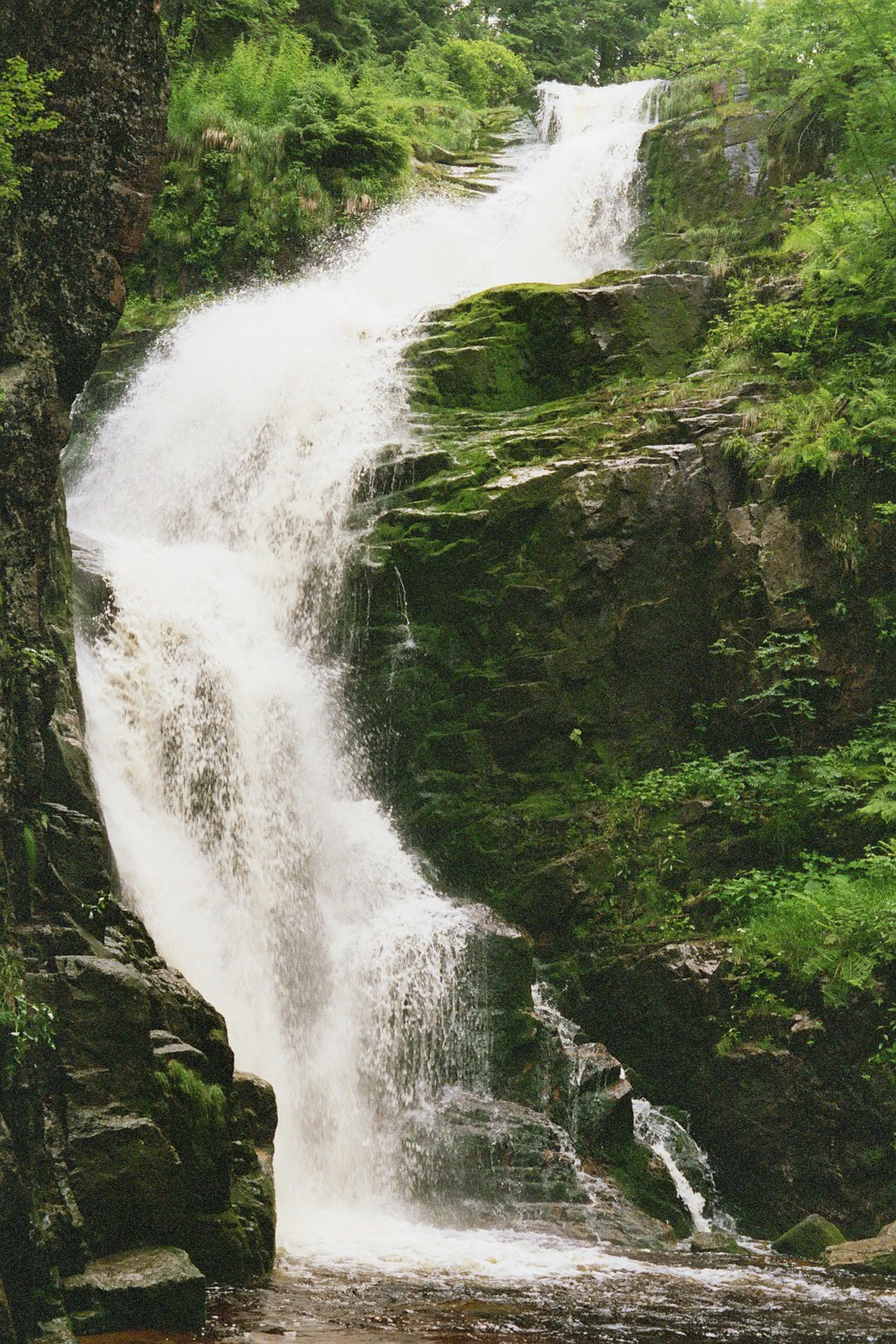
Kamieńczyk Falls in summer

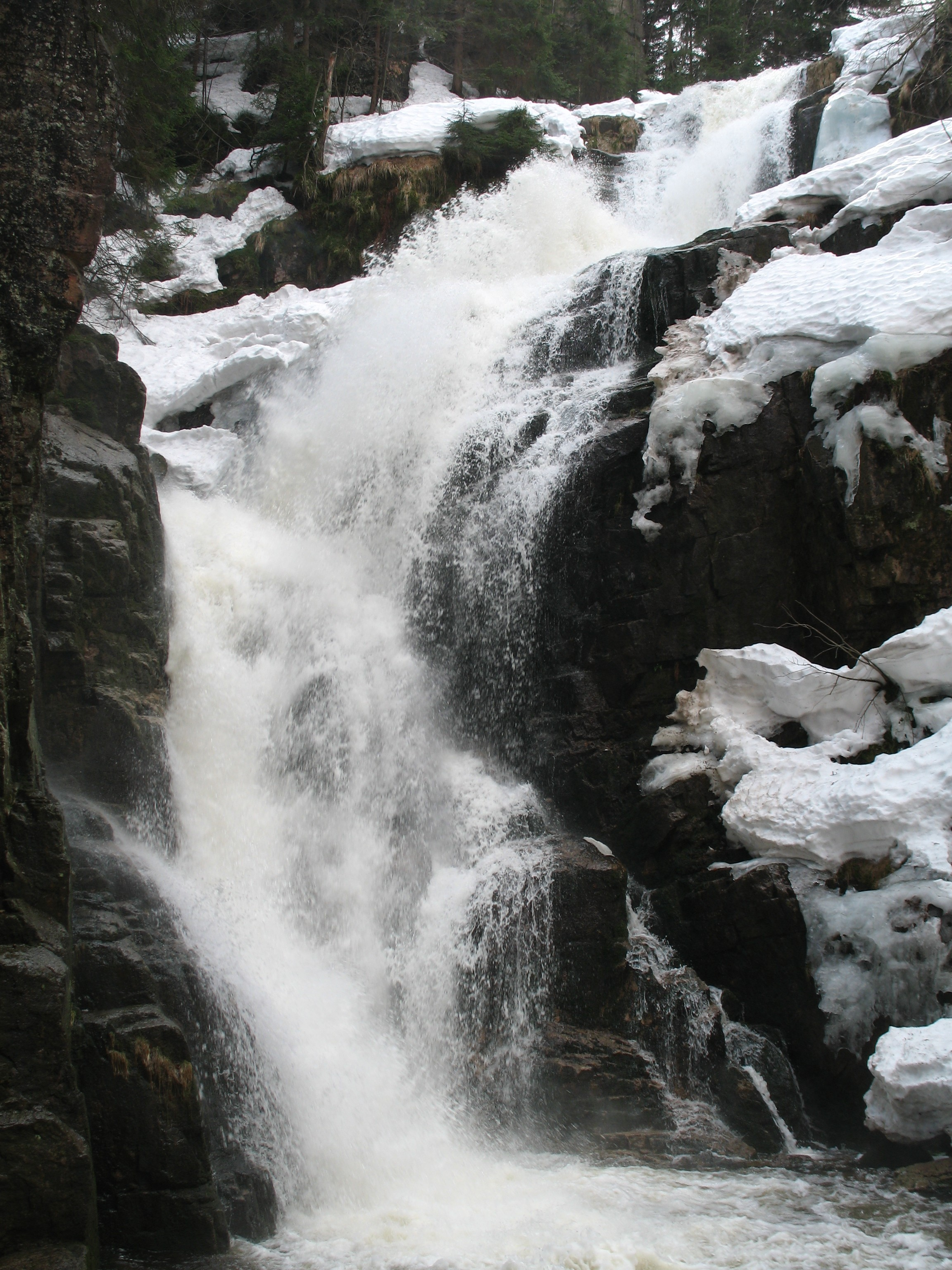
Kamieńczyk Falls in winter

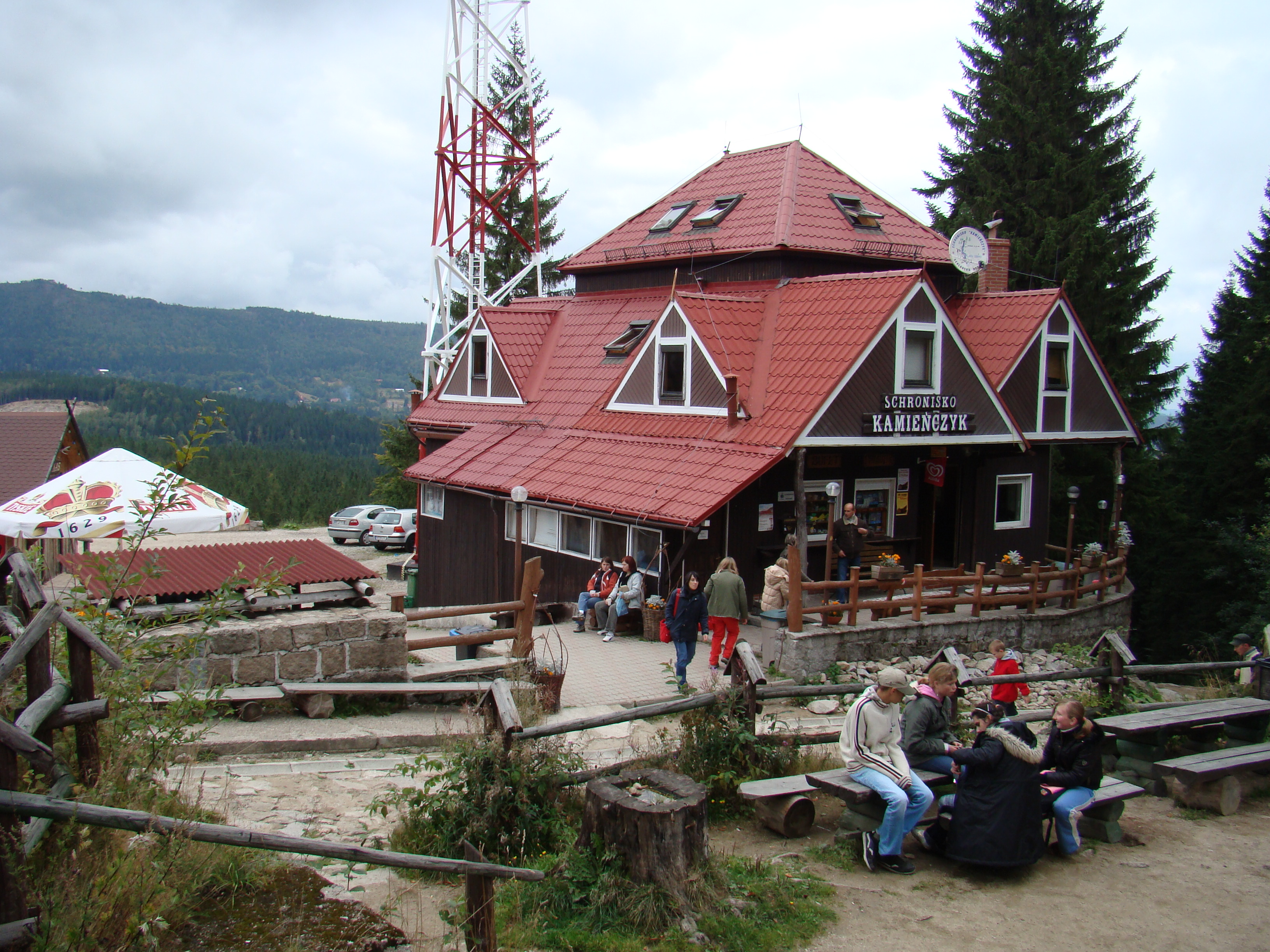
"Kamieńczyk" mountain shelter located near the waterfall

== See also ==
- Geography of Poland
- List of waterfalls
- Siklawa Falls
