= Stara Kamienica railway station =

Railway station in Stara Kamienica, south-western Poland

Stara Kamienica
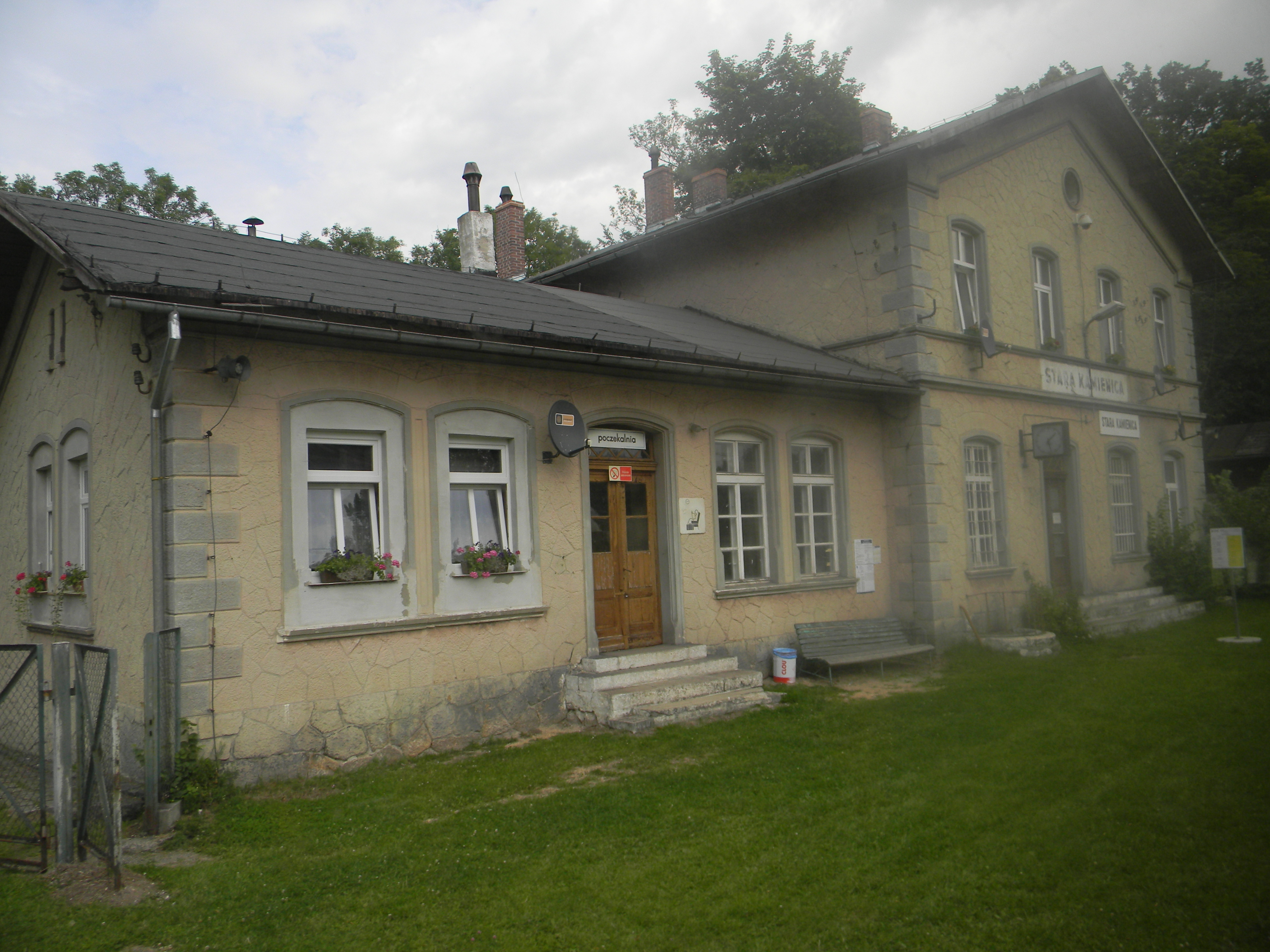
- Station building in July 2012

General information
- Location: Stara Kamienica, Lower Silesian Voivodeship; Poland
- Coordinates: 50°54′50.8″N 15°33′59.3″E
- Owner: PKP Polskie Linie Kolejowe
- Line: Wrocław Świebodzki–Zgorzelec
- Platforms: 2

History
- Opened: 20 September 1865
- Former names: Alt Kemnitz (1865–1914); Alt Kemnitz (Riesengebirge) (1914–1945); Kamienica Stara (1945–1947)

Services
| Preceding station | KD | Following station |
|---|---|---|
| Rybnica towards Karpacz | D62 | Kwieciszowice towards Görlitz |
Location
- Location within Poland Location within Lower Silesian Voivodeship

Stara Kamienica is a railway station in the village of Stara Kamienica, Karkonosze County within the Lower Silesian Voivodeship in south-western Poland.

== History ==
The station was opened by the Wrocław-Świdnica-Świebodzice Railway Company as Alt Kemnitz on 20 September 1865. The station was renamed to Alt Kemnitz (Riesengebirge) in 1914. After World War II, the area came under Polish administration. As a result, the station was taken over by Polish State Railways. It was renamed to Kamienica Stara in 1945, and eventually to its modern name, Kwieciszowice, in 1947.

== Train services ==
The station is served by the following services:

- Regional services (KD) Karpacz / Świeradów-Zdrój - Gryfów Śląski - Görlitz
