= Szyszak =

Szyszak may refer to:

- a Polish lobster-tailed pot helmet
- Mały Szyszak, a mountain on the Czech–Polish border (elevation 1,439 m)
- Wielki Szyszak, a mountain on the Czech–Polish border (elevation 1,509 m)
