= Rybnica railway station =

Railway station in Rybnica, south-western Poland

Rybnica
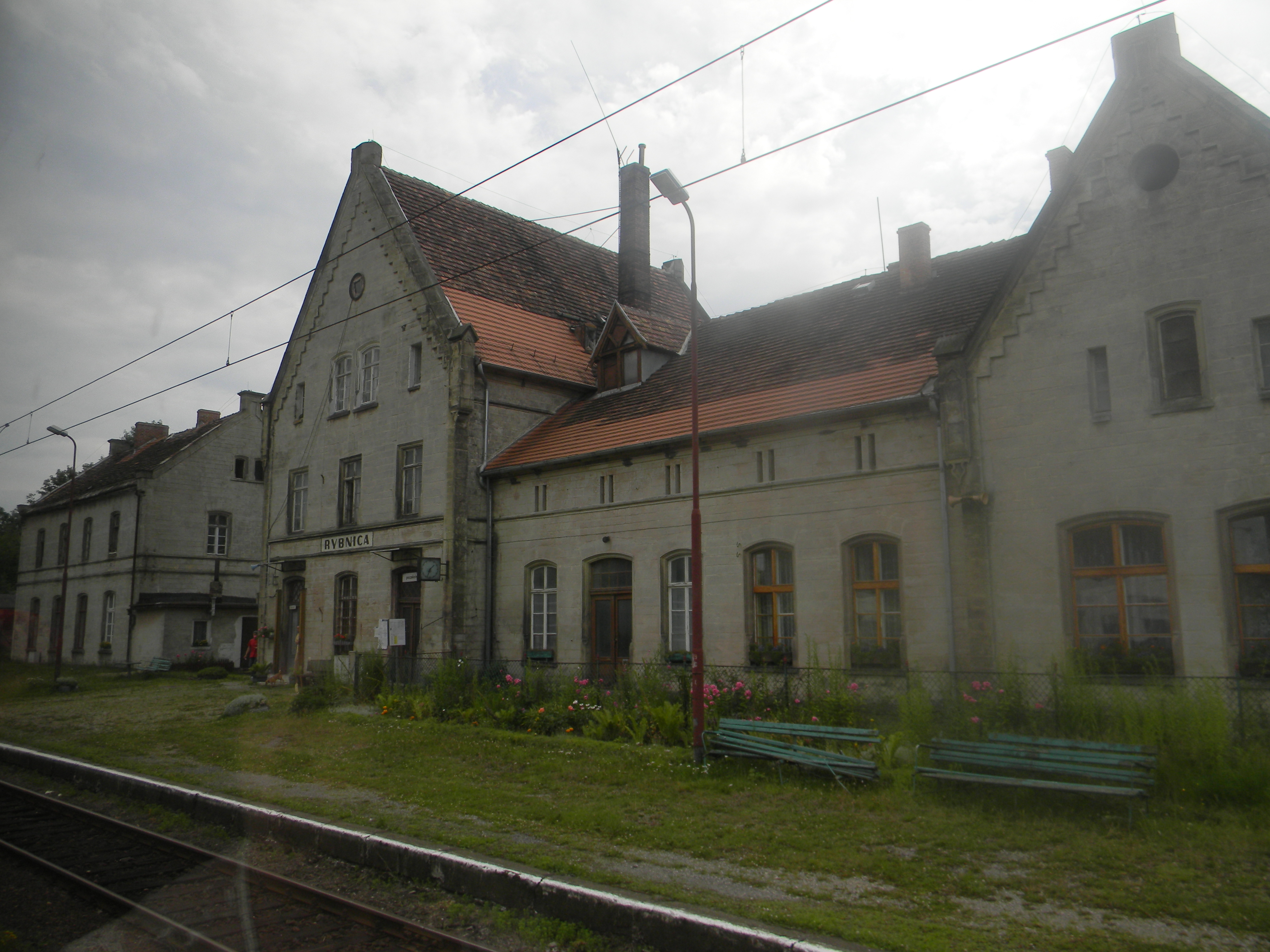
- Station building in July 2012

General information
- Location: Rybnica, Lower Silesian Voivodeship; Poland
- Coordinates: 50°54′38.2″N 15°38′40.2″E
- Owner: PKP Polskie Linie Kolejowe
- Line: Wrocław Świebodzki–Zgorzelec
- Platforms: 2

History
- Opened: 20 September 1865
- Former names: Reibnitz (1865–1945); Rybnick (1945–1947)

Services
| Preceding station | KD | Following station |
|---|---|---|
| Jelenia Góra Zabobrze towards Karpacz | D62 | Stara Kamienica towards Görlitz |
Location
- Location within Poland Location within Lower Silesian Voivodeship

Rybnica is a railway station in the village of Rybnica, Karkonosze County within the Lower Silesian Voivodeship in south-western Poland.

== History ==
The station was opened by the Wrocław-Świdnica-Świebodzice Railway Company as Reibnitz on 20 September 1865. After World War II, the area came under Polish administration. As a result, the station was taken over by Polish State Railways. It was renamed to Rybnick in 1945, and eventually to its modern name, Rybnica, in 1947.

A short single-span railway viaduct, 6.2 m (20 ft) long is situated just west of the station.

== Train services ==
The station is served by the following services:

- Regional services (KD) Karpacz / Świeradów-Zdrój - Gryfów Śląski - Görlitz
