= Nowa Kamienica =

- Village
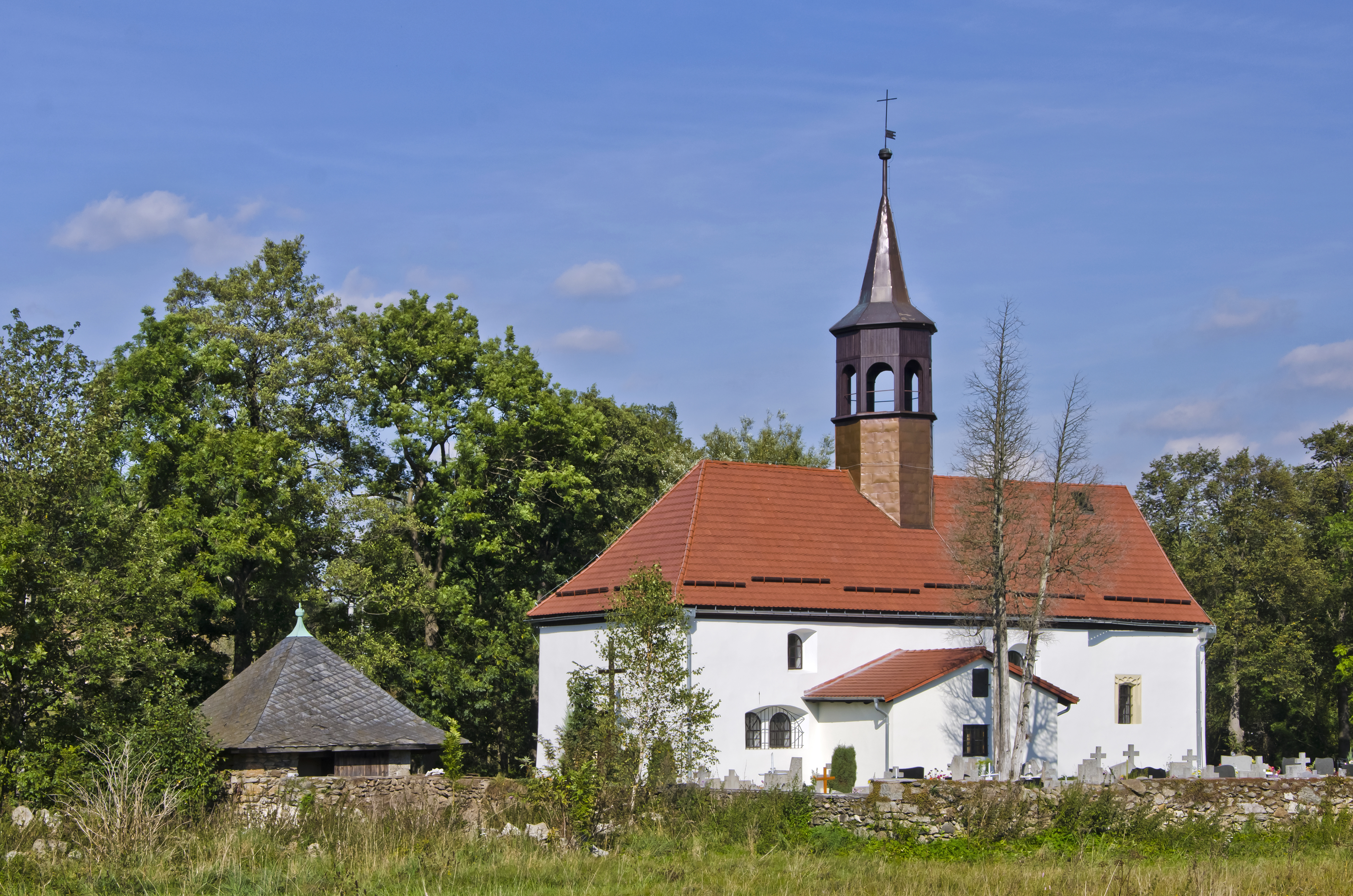
- Church of the Beheading of St. John the Baptist in Nowa Kamienica

- Location within Poland
- Coordinates: 50°55′47″N 15°31′42″E
- Country: Poland
- Voivodeship: Lower Silesian
- County: Karkonosze
- Gmina: Stara Kamienica
- Time zone: UTC+1 (CET)
  - Summer (DST): UTC+2 (CEST)
- Vehicle registration: DJE

Nowa Kamienica [ˈnɔva kamjɛˈnit͡sa] is a village in the administrative district of Gmina Stara Kamienica, within Karkonosze County, Lower Silesian Voivodeship, in south-western Poland.

The name of the village is of Polish origin and is derived from the word kamień, which means "stone".
