= Kopanina, Lower Silesian Voivodeship =

Kopanina
- Village
- Location within Poland
- Coordinates: 50°52′45″N 15°34′45″E
- Country: Poland
- Voivodeship: Lower Silesian
- County: Karkonosze
- Gmina: Stara Kamienica

Kopanina [kɔpaˈnina] is a village in the administrative district of Gmina Stara Kamienica, within Karkonosze County, Lower Silesian Voivodeship, in south-western Poland.
