= Antoniów, Lower Silesian Voivodeship =

Antoniów
- Village
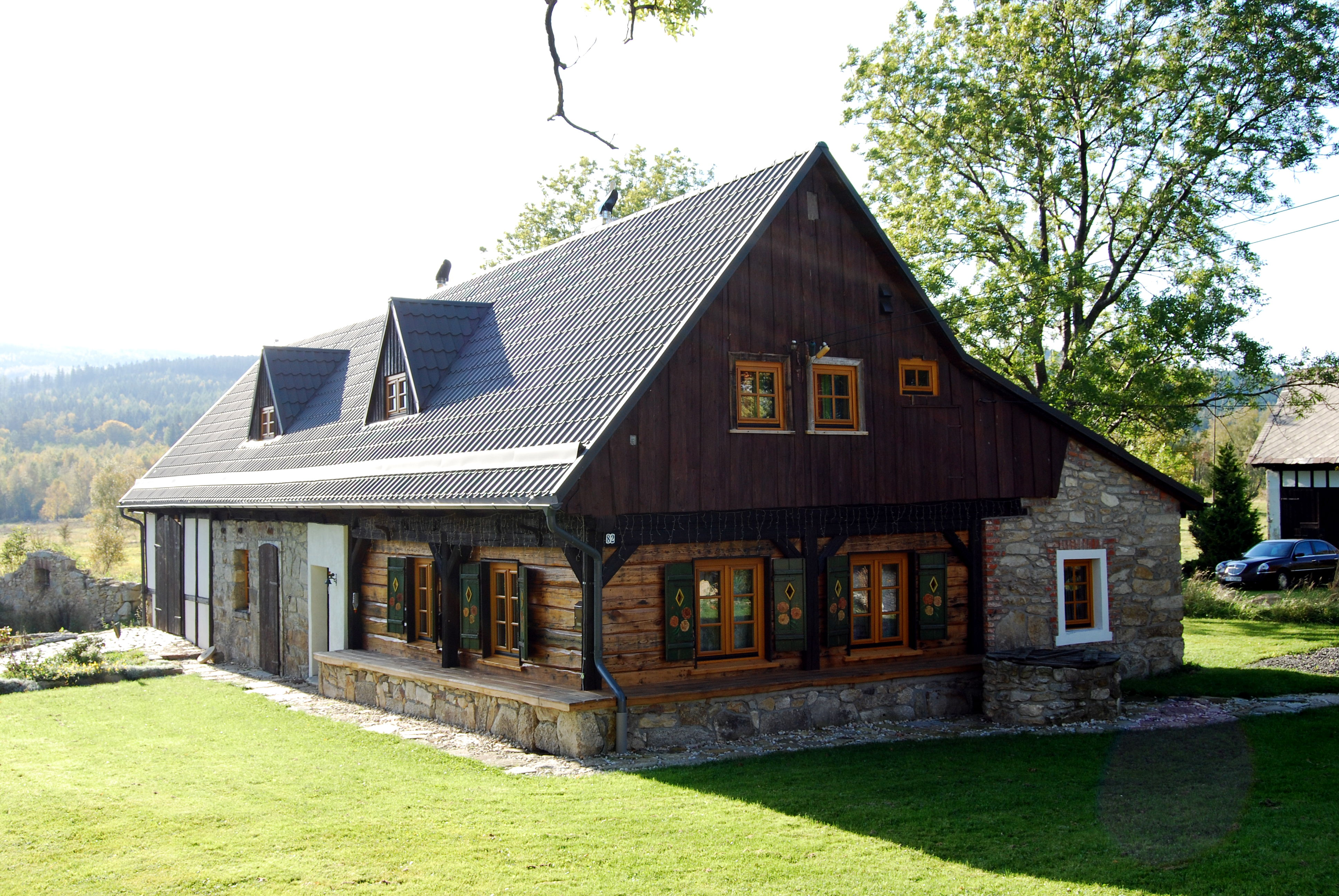
- Old house in Antoniów

- Location within Poland
- Coordinates: 50°53′30″N 15°30′31″E
- Country: Poland
- Voivodeship: Lower Silesian
- County: Karkonosze
- Gmina: Stara Kamienica
- Time zone: UTC+1 (CET)
  - Summer (DST): UTC+2 (CEST)
- Vehicle registration: DJE

Antoniów [anˈtɔɲuf] is a village in the administrative district of Gmina Stara Kamienica, within Karkonosze County, Lower Silesian Voivodeship, in south-western Poland.

During World War II, the Germans established and operated a forced labour camp in the village, in which they imprisoned Italian and Soviet prisoners of war. The prisoners lived and worked in poor sanitary conditions, and were forced to exhausting labour.
