= Mały Szyszak =

Mountain in Poland

- Czech: Malý Šišák; German: Kleine Sturmhaube
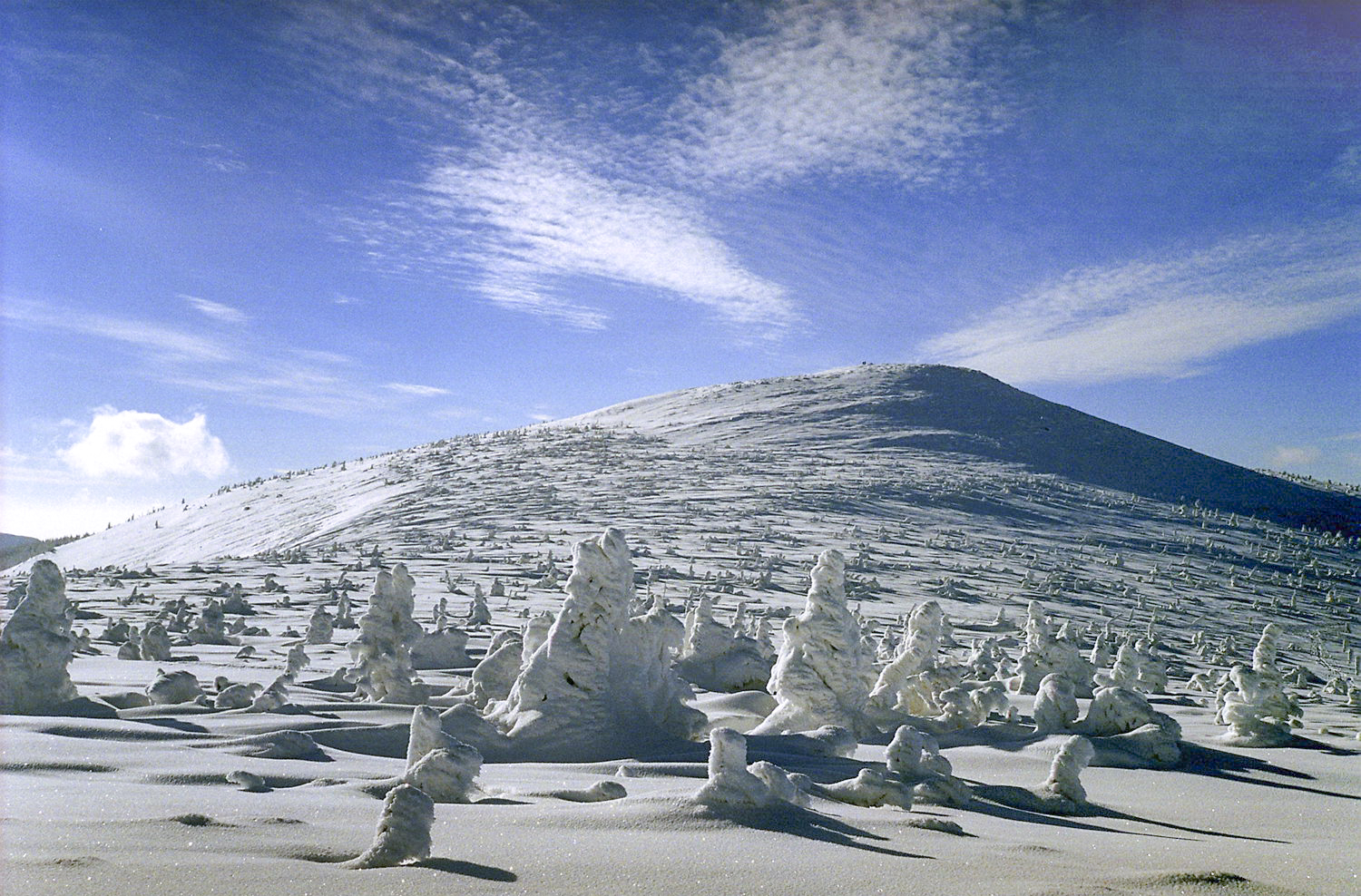

Highest point
- Elevation: 1,439 m (4,721 ft)
- Coordinates: 50°45′34″N 15°38′55″E

Geography
- Location: Poland; Czech Republic
- Parent range: Giant Mountains

Mały Szyszak (Polish pronunciation: [ˈmawɨ ˈʂɨʂak], Czech: Malý Šišák, [ˈmaliː ˈʃɪʃaːk], German: Kleine Sturmhaube, lit. 'Small Helmet') is a mountain on the border between the Czech Republic and Poland. It is situated in the central part of the main mountain range of the Giant Mountains, right above the villages Przesieka and Špindlerův Mlýn.

It is separated from the Wielki Szyszak mountain by Ptasi Kamień, Giant Mountains Pass, Silesian Stones, Czech Stones and Śmielec.
