= Kromnów =

Kromnów may refer to the following places in Poland:

- Kromnów, Lower Silesian Voivodeship (south-west Poland)
- Kromnów, Masovian Voivodeship (east-central Poland)
