= Wojcieszyce, Lower Silesian Voivodeship =

Wojcieszyce
- Village
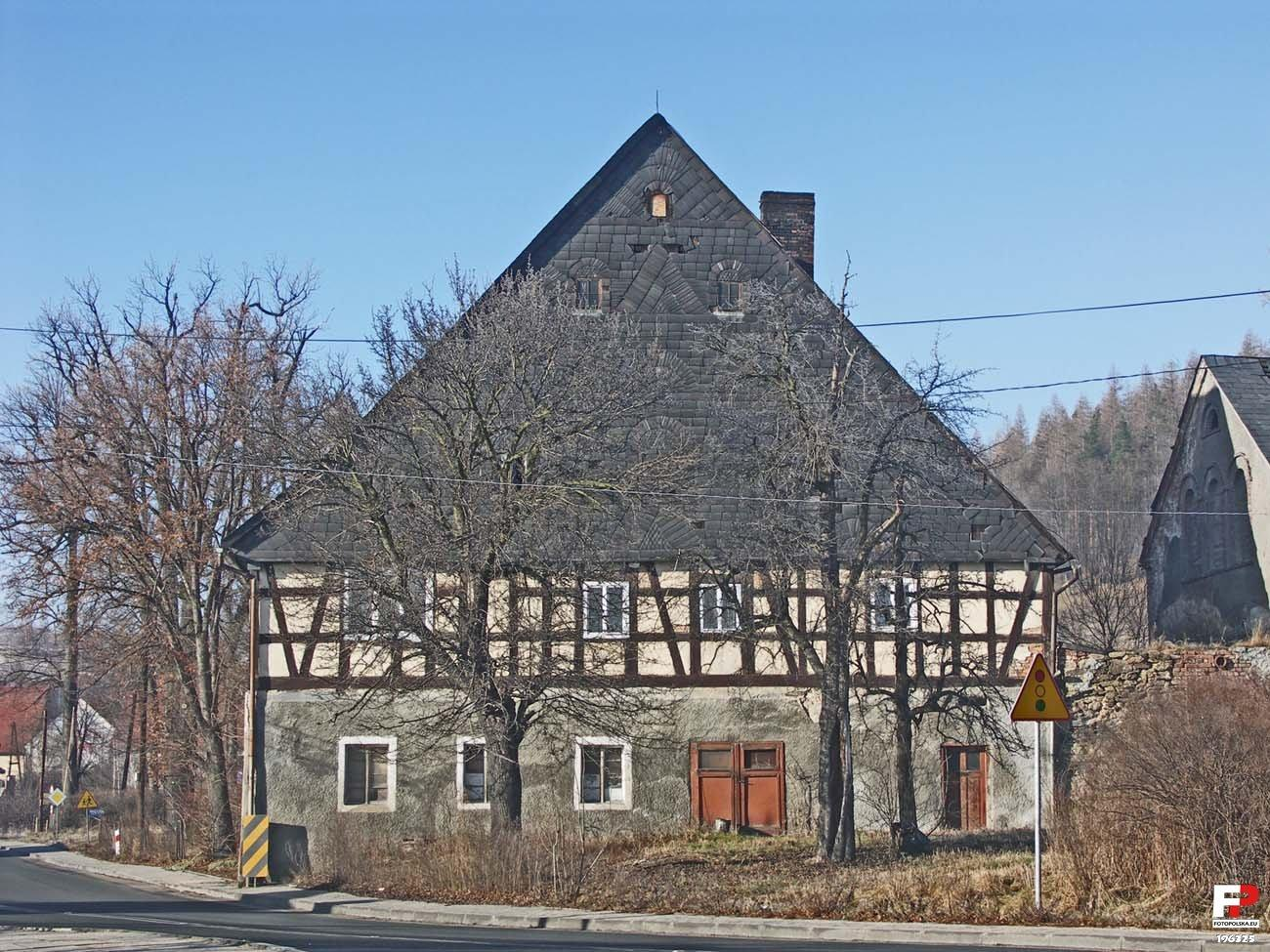

- Location within Poland
- Coordinates: 50°53′N 15°38′E
- Country: Poland
- Voivodeship: Lower Silesian
- County: Karkonosze
- Gmina: Stara Kamienica

Wojcieszyce (Polish: [vɔjt͡ɕɛˈʂɨt͡sɛ]; German: Voigtsdorf) is a village situated along National Road 3 in the administrative district of Gmina Stara Kamienica, within Karkonosze County, Lower Silesian Voivodeship, in south-western Poland. From 1975 to 1998, it was part of Jelenia Góra Voivodeship.

According to the National Heritage Board of Poland's registry, there are two historical sites in the village; The Church of Saint Barbara, built around 1761, and a Protestant church built in 1775.
