= Barcinek, Lower Silesian Voivodeship =

Barcinek
- Village
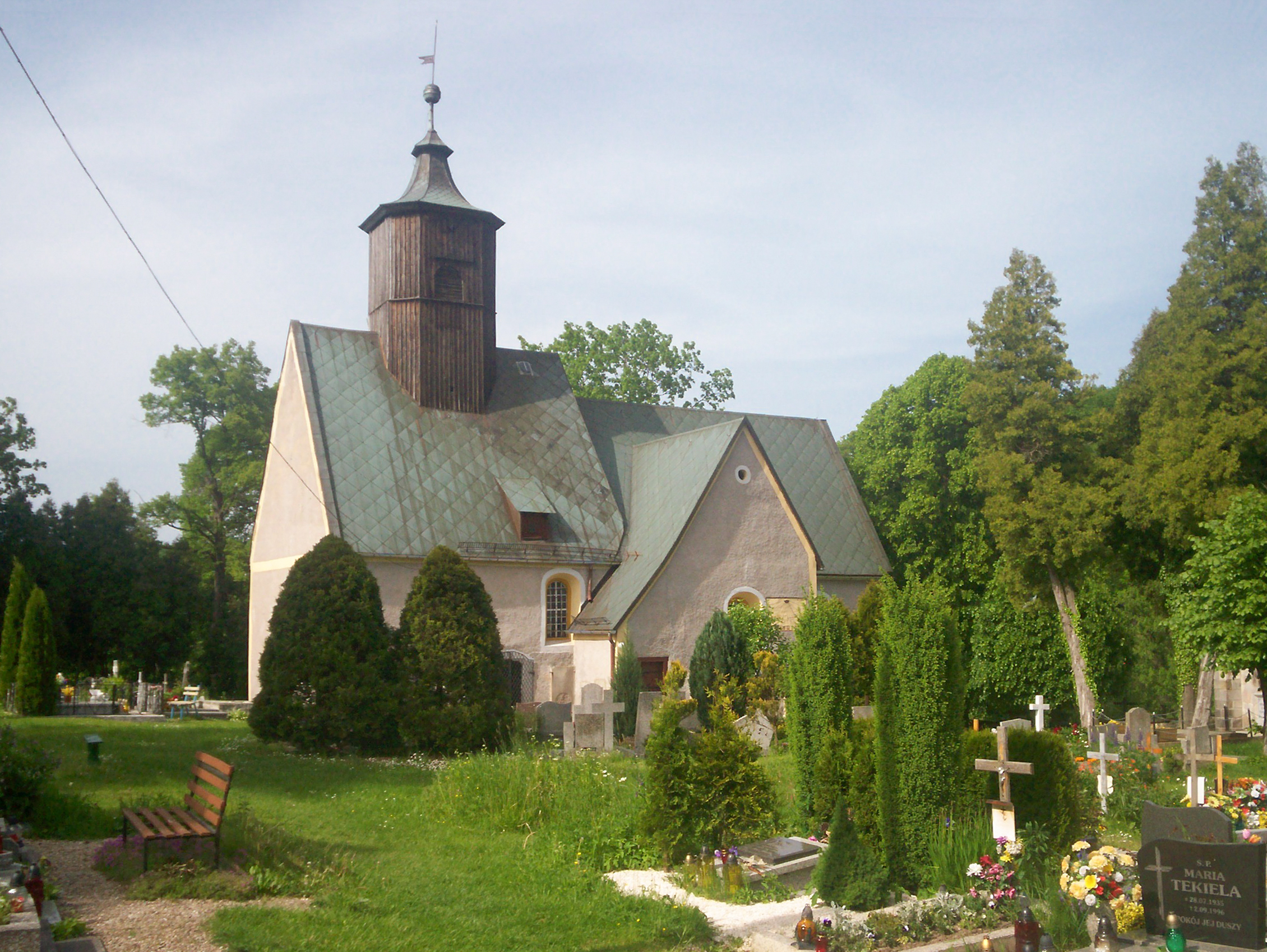

- Location within Poland
- Coordinates: 50°56′N 15°36′E
- Country: Poland
- Voivodeship: Lower Silesian
- County: Karkonosze
- Gmina: Stara Kamienica
- Population: 610

Barcinek (Polish pronunciation: [barˈt͡ɕinɛk]) is a village in the administrative district of Gmina Stara Kamienica, within Karkonosze County, Lower Silesian Voivodeship, in south-western Poland.

Berthelsdorf palace was built in 1772 by Count von Rothkirch on the site of an earlier foundation from the 16th century. This is evidenced by the stone arcade of the gate preserved in the wall surrounding the complex, dated 1565. During the reconstruction around 1890, a tower was added on the northern side. Until 1945, it was owned by the von Wartenberg family.

After the expulsion of the German inhabitants, the palace was to be the summer residence of the President of the Republic of Poland, but eventually it was handed over to the local state farm. Not used since the 1980s, it fell into disrepair.
