= Międzylesie, Karkonosze County =

Międzylesie
- Village
- Location within Poland
- Coordinates: 50°53′53″N 15°31′45″E
- Country: Poland
- Voivodeship: Lower Silesian
- County: Karkonosze
- Gmina: Stara Kamienica
- Time zone: UTC+1 (CET)
  - Summer (DST): UTC+2 (CEST)
- Vehicle registration: Dja

Międzylesie [mjɛnd͡zɨˈlɛɕɛ] is a small village in the administrative district of Gmina Stara Kamienica, within Karkonosze County, Lower Silesian Voivodeship, in south-western Poland. The hamlet belongs to the village of Kopaniec.

The village was founded around a mill on the river Kamienica at the foot of the Trzciniak mountain. In the first half of the 18th century a hunter's house was located here in the property of the Schaffgotsch family. Later a mill was built by the Schaffgotsch family as well as a settlement. Near the mill was a famous restaurant called Die Rambergschenke. In 1978 there were six farms in Międzylesie. In 2008 there were four houses – one of them houses the Nemoland international cultural centre.
