= Chromiec, Lower Silesian Voivodeship =

Chromiec
- Village
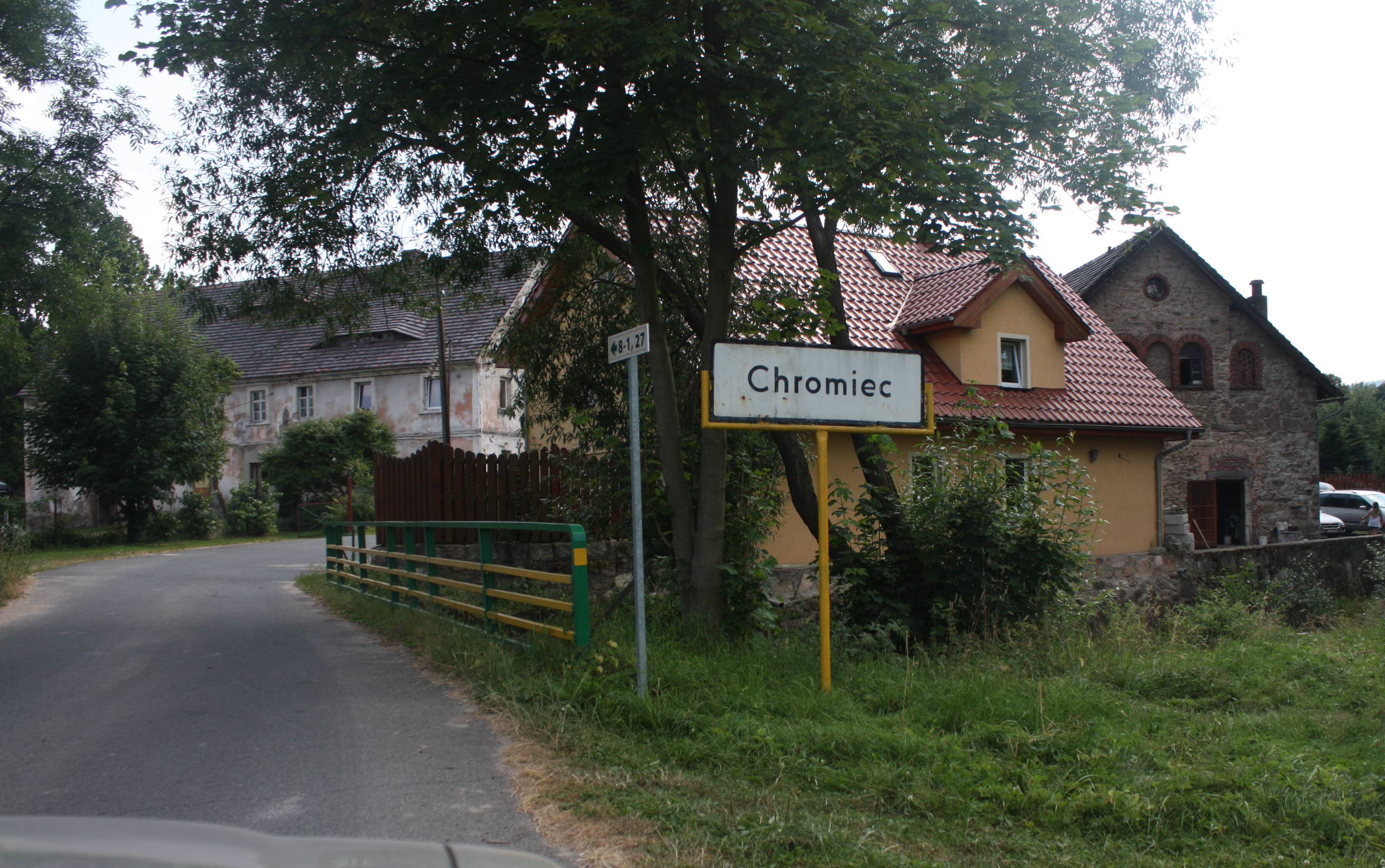

- Location within Poland
- Coordinates: 50°53′42″N 15°30′55″E
- Country: Poland
- Voivodeship: Lower Silesian
- County: Karkonosze
- Gmina: Stara Kamienica

Chromiec [ˈxrɔmjɛt͡s] is a village in the administrative district of Gmina Stara Kamienica, within Karkonosze County, Lower Silesian Voivodeship, in south-western Poland.
