= Kopaniec, Lower Silesian Voivodeship =

Kopaniec
- Village
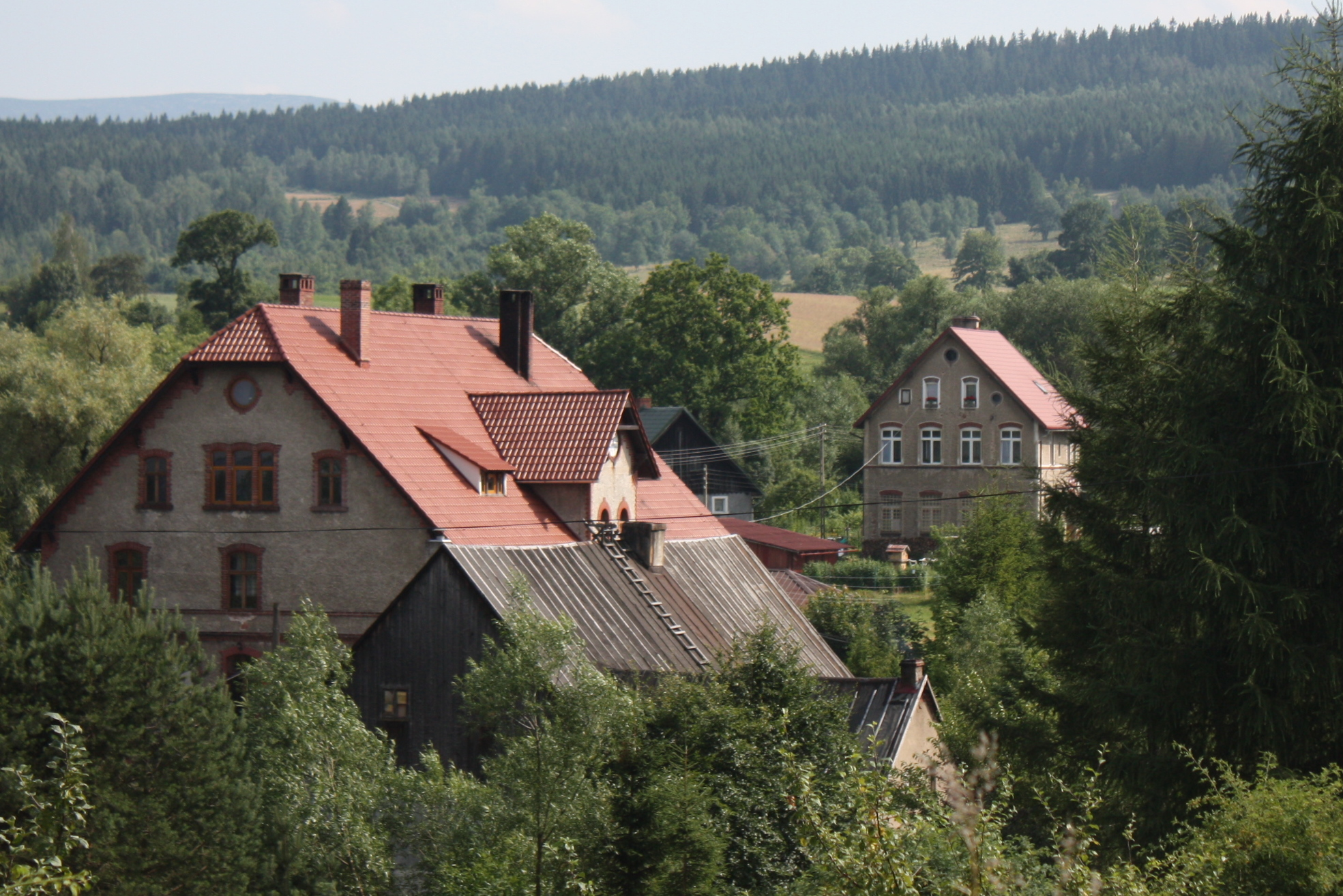

- Location within Poland
- Coordinates: 50°53′11″N 15°32′49″E
- Country: Poland
- Voivodeship: Lower Silesian
- County: Karkonosze
- Gmina: Stara Kamienica

Kopaniec [kɔˈpaɲɛt͡s] is a village in the administrative district of Gmina Stara Kamienica, within Karkonosze County, Lower Silesian Voivodeship, in south-western Poland.

Kopaniec is situated in the foothills of the Jizera Mountains (Góry Izerskie) near the Karkonosze. The village is well known because the artist colony (see www.kopaniec.pl). There are many agro-tourist facilities.
