= Jaroszyce =

- Village
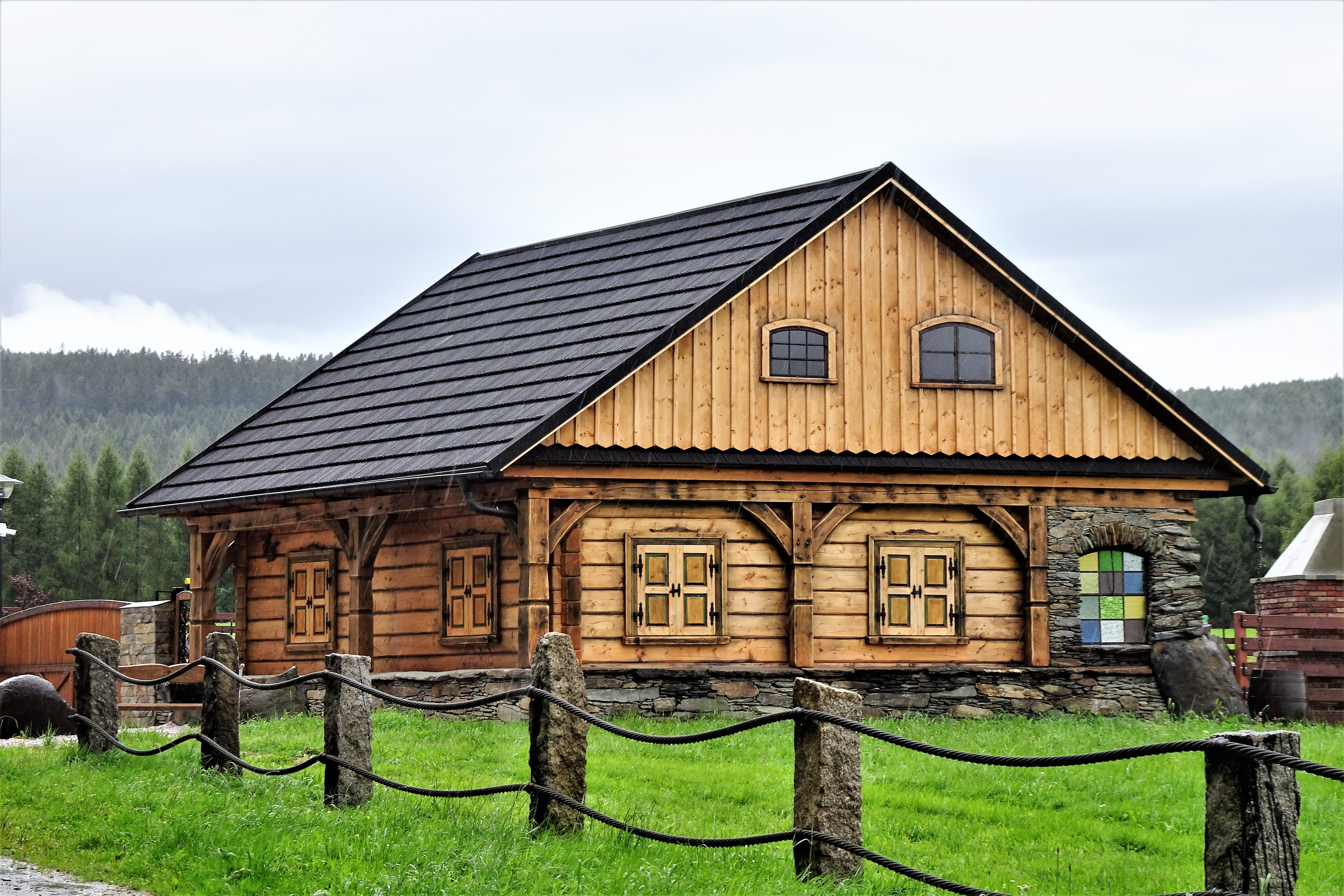

- Location within Poland
- Coordinates: 50°54′21″N 15°29′32″E
- Country: Poland
- Voivodeship: Lower Silesian
- County: Karkonosze
- Gmina: Stara Kamienica
- Time zone: UTC+1 (CET)
  - Summer (DST): UTC+2 (CEST)
- Vehicle registration: DJE

Jaroszyce [jarɔˈʂɨt͡sɛ] is a village in the administrative district of Gmina Stara Kamienica, within Karkonosze County, Lower Silesian Voivodeship, in south-western Poland.
