= Mała Kamienica =

- Village
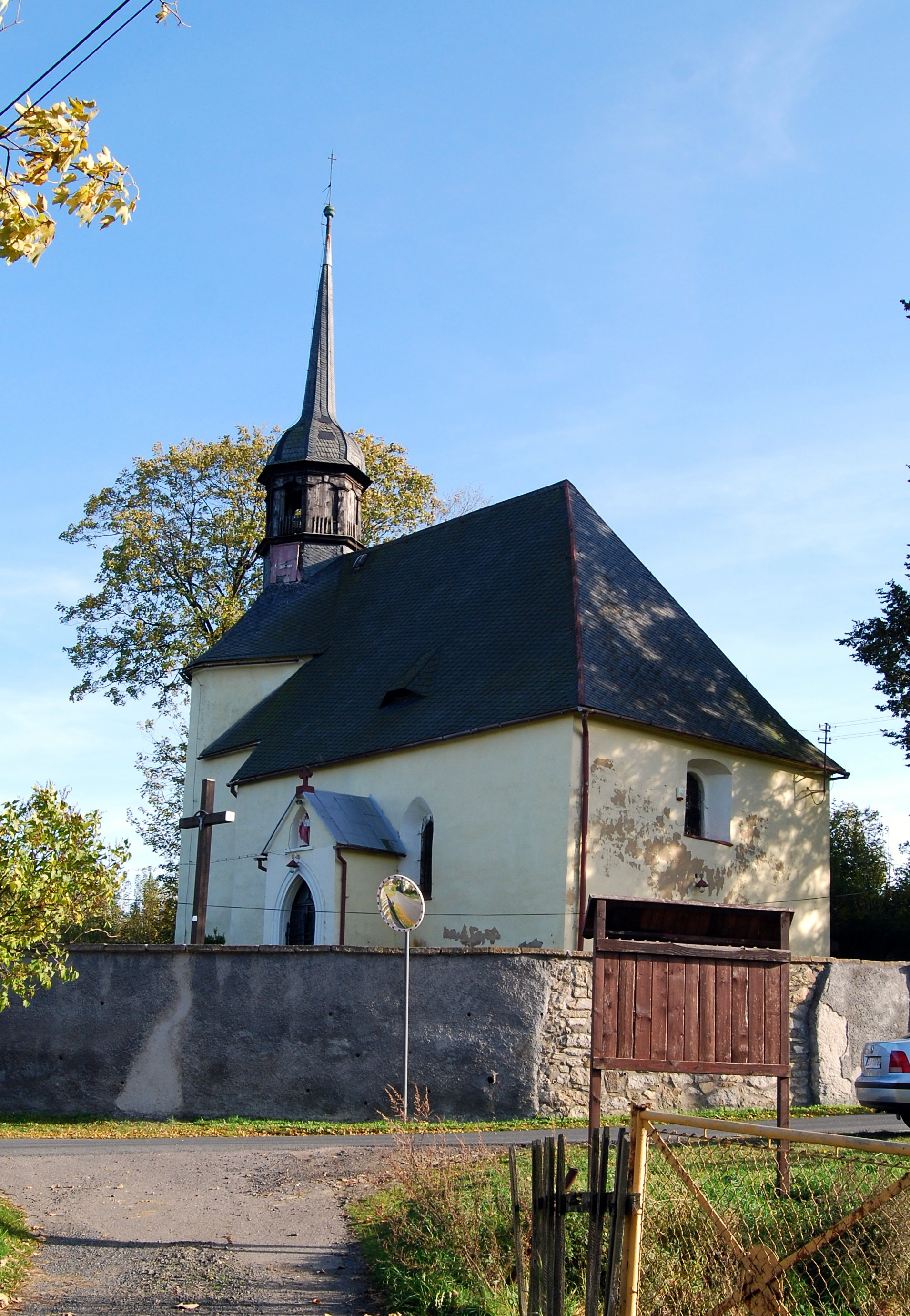
- Saint Barbara church in Mała Kamienica

- Location within Poland
- Coordinates: 50°54′35.3″N 15°32′34.3″E
- Country: Poland
- Voivodeship: Lower Silesian
- County: Karkonosze
- Gmina: Stara Kamienica
- Time zone: UTC+1 (CET)
  - Summer (DST): UTC+2 (CEST)
- Vehicle registration: DJE

Mała Kamienica [ˈmawa kamjɛˈnit͡sa] is a village in the administrative district of Gmina Stara Kamienica, within Karkonosze County, Lower Silesian Voivodeship, in south-western Poland.

A trade route connecting Jelenia Góra with Frýdlant and Zittau passed through the village in the late medieval and early modern periods.
