= Gmina Stara Kamienica =

Gmina Stara Kamienica Stara Kamienica Commune
- Gmina
- Flag Coat of arms
- Interactive map of Gmina Stara Kamienica
- Coordinates (Stara Kamienica): 50°55′4″N 15°33′49″E
- Country: Poland
- Voivodeship: Lower Silesian
- County: Karkonosze
- Seat: Stara Kamienica
- Sołectwos: Antoniów, Barcinek, Chromiec, Kopaniec, Kromnów, Mała Kamienica, Nowa Kamienica, Rybnica, Stara Kamienica, Wojcieszyce

Area
  - Total: 110.46 km^{2} (42.65 sq mi)

Population (2019-06-30)
  - Total: 5,266
  - Density: 47.67/km^{2} (123.5/sq mi)
- Website: http://www.starakamienica.pl

Gmina Stara Kamienica is a rural gmina (administrative district) in Karkonosze County, Lower Silesian Voivodeship, in south-western Poland. Its seat is the village of Stara Kamienica, which lies approximately 13 kilometres (8 mi) west of Jelenia Góra, and 106 kilometres (66 mi) west of the regional capital Wrocław.

The gmina covers an area of 110.46 square kilometres (42.6 sq mi), and as of 2019 its total population is 5,266.

== Neighbouring gminas ==
Gmina Stara Kamienica is bordered by the towns of Jelenia Góra, Piechowice and Szklarska Poręba, and the gminas of Jeżów Sudecki, Lubomierz and Mirsk.

== Villages ==
The gmina contains the villages of Antoniów, Barcinek, Chromiec, Jaroszyce, Kopaniec, Kopanina, Kromnów, Mała Kamienica, Międzylesie, Nowa Kamienica, Rybnica, Sosnka, Stara Kamienica and Wojcieszyce.
