= Rębiszów railway station =

Railway station in Rębiszów, south-western Poland

Rębiszów
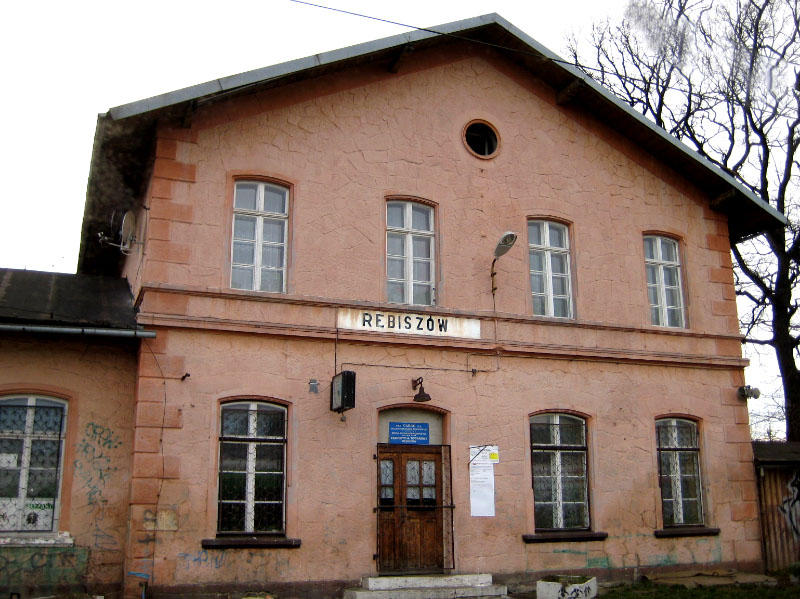
- Station building in March 2008

General information
- Location: Rębiszów, Lower Silesian Voivodeship; Poland
- Coordinates: 50°56′53.9″N 15°27′21.0″E
- Owner: PKP Polskie Linie Kolejowe
- Line: Wrocław Świebodzki–Zgorzelec
- Platforms: 3

History
- Opened: 20 September 1865
- Former names: Rabishau (1898–1945); Rąbsz (1945–1947)

Services
Preceding station	KD	Following station
Kwieciszowice towards Karpacz	D62	Młyńsko towards Görlitz
Location
- Location within Poland Location within Lower Silesian Voivodeship

Rębiszów is a railway station in the village of Rębiszów, Lwówek County within the Lower Silesian Voivodeship in south-western Poland.

== History ==
The station was opened by the Wrocław-Świdnica-Świebodzice Railway Company as Rabishau on 20 September 1865. After World War II, the area came under Polish administration. As a result, the station was taken over by Polish State Railways. It was renamed to Rąbsz in 1945, and eventually to its modern name, Rębiszów, in 1947.

== Train services ==
The station is served by the following services:

- Regional services (KD) Karpacz / Świeradów-Zdrój - Gryfów Śląski - Görlitz
