= Śmielec =

Mountain in Poland and the Czech Republic

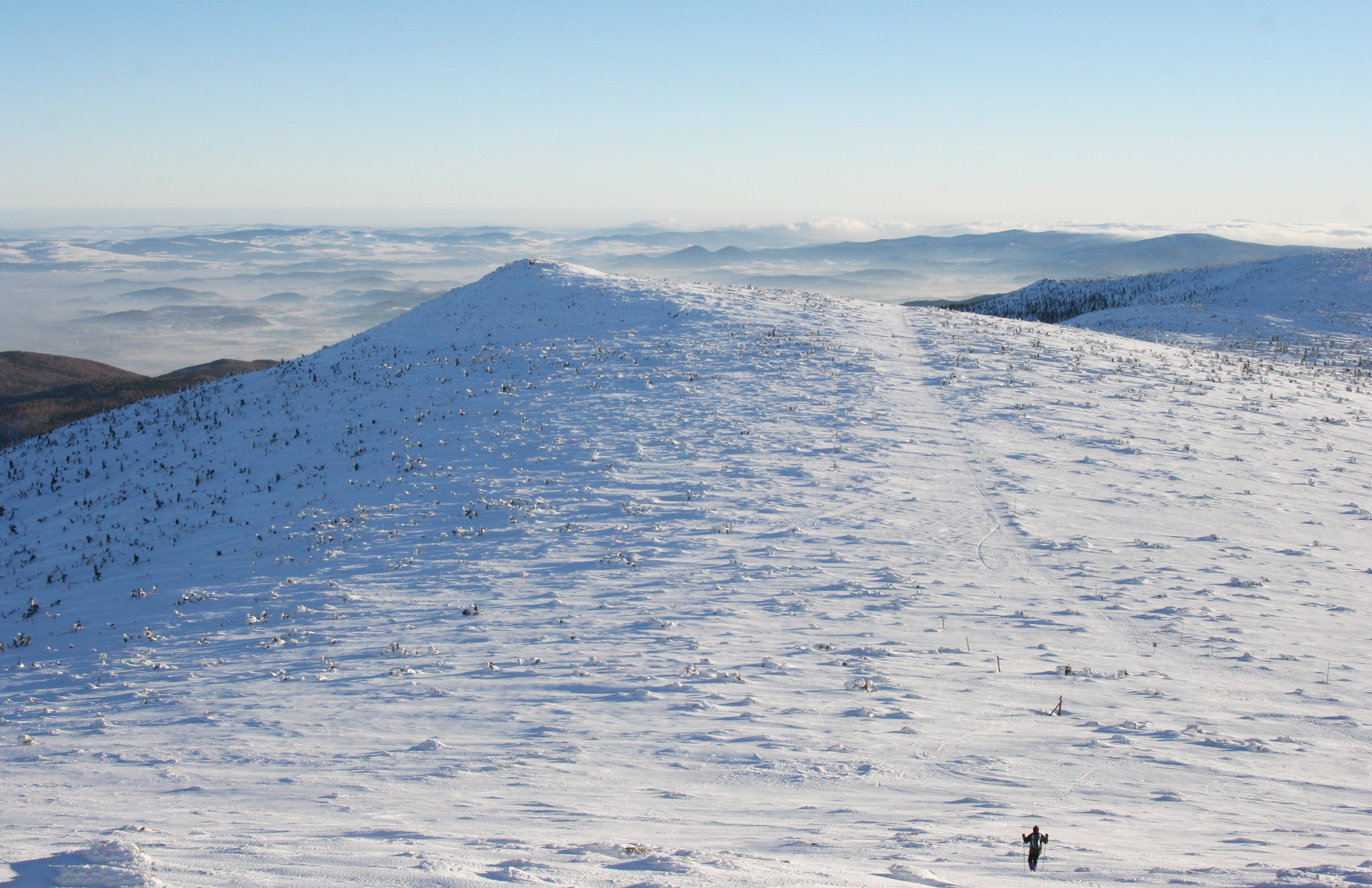
- The summit as seen from the peak Wielki Szyszak

Highest point
- Elevation: 1,424 m (4,672 ft)
- Coordinates: 50°46′49″N 15°34′42″E

Geography
- Location: Piechowice
- Parent range: Giant Mountains

Climbing
- Easiest route: public path marked red from Szklarska Poręba and Przełęcz Karkonoska

Śmielec is a mountain peak in the western part of the Giant Mountains in Poland and the Czech Republic within the Karkonosze National Park. The park is covered in granite rubble.

== Situation ==
In the main range the very distinct peak is situated between Łabski Szczyt and Czeskie Kamienie. The summit with an elevation of 1,424 metres (4,672 ft) is entirely on the Polish side in the territory of Piechowice. The southern slopes are in the territory of Špindlerův Mlýn.

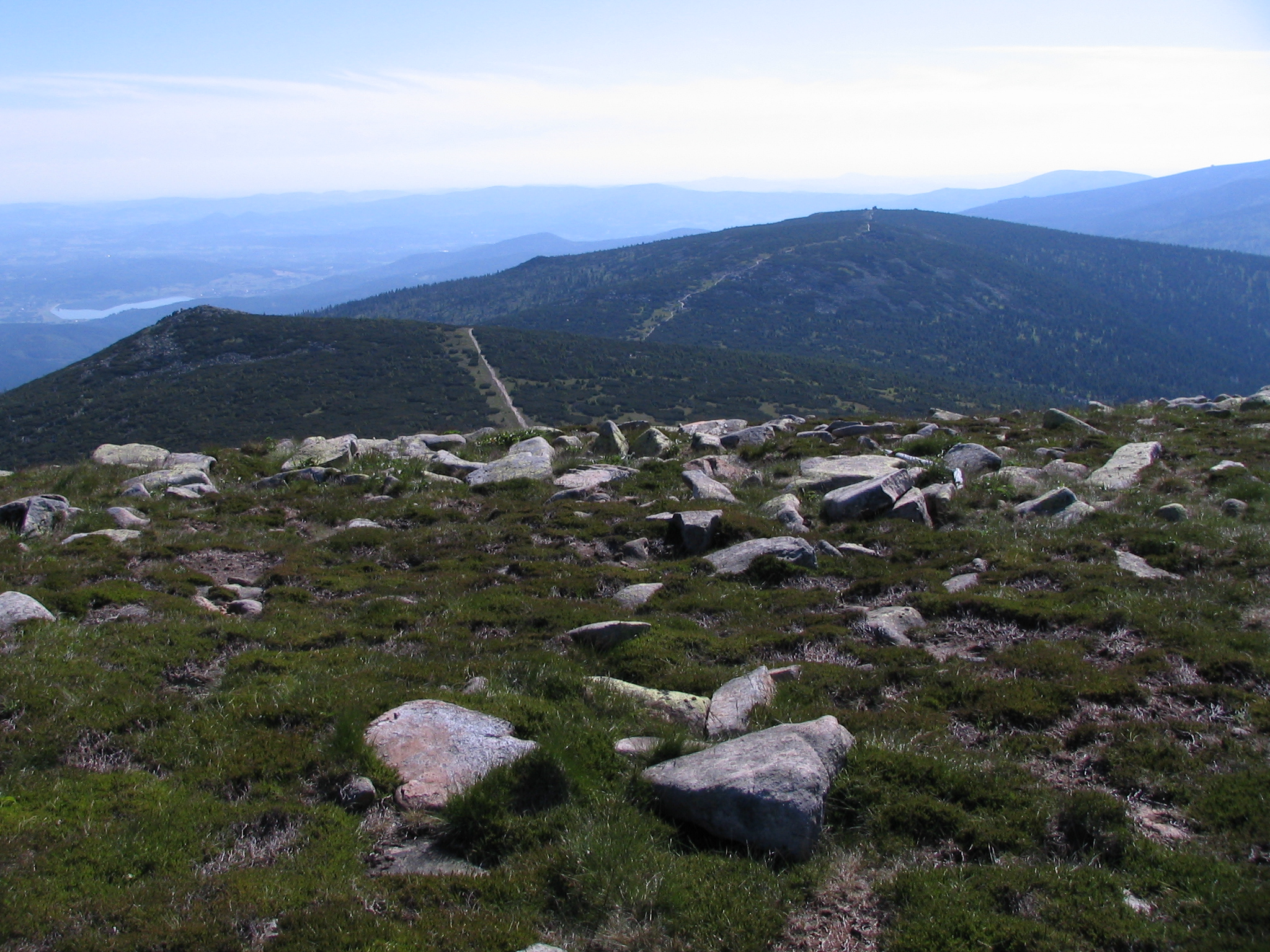
Śmielec from the summit of Wielki Szyszak

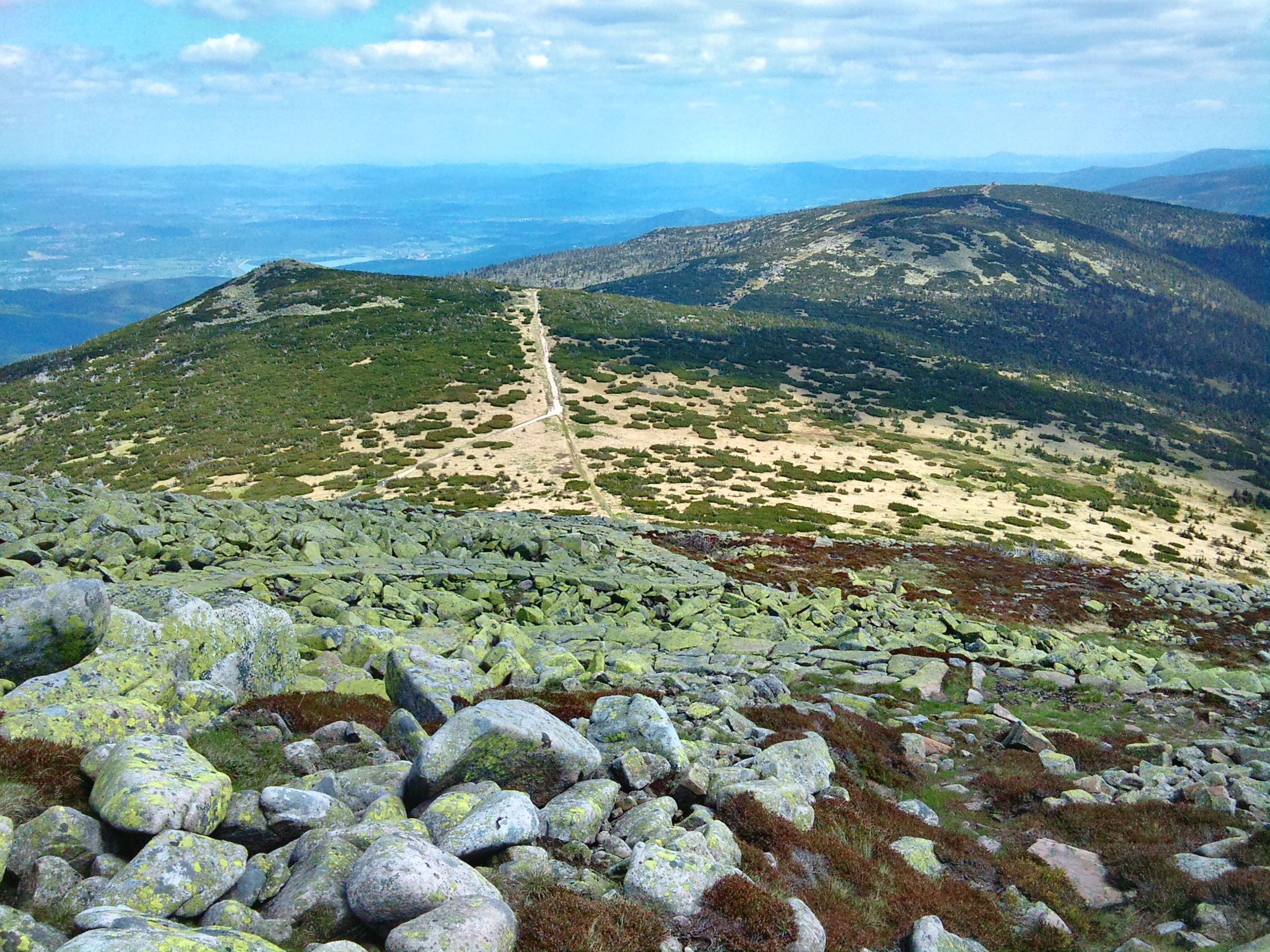
Śmielec from the slope of Wielki Szyszak

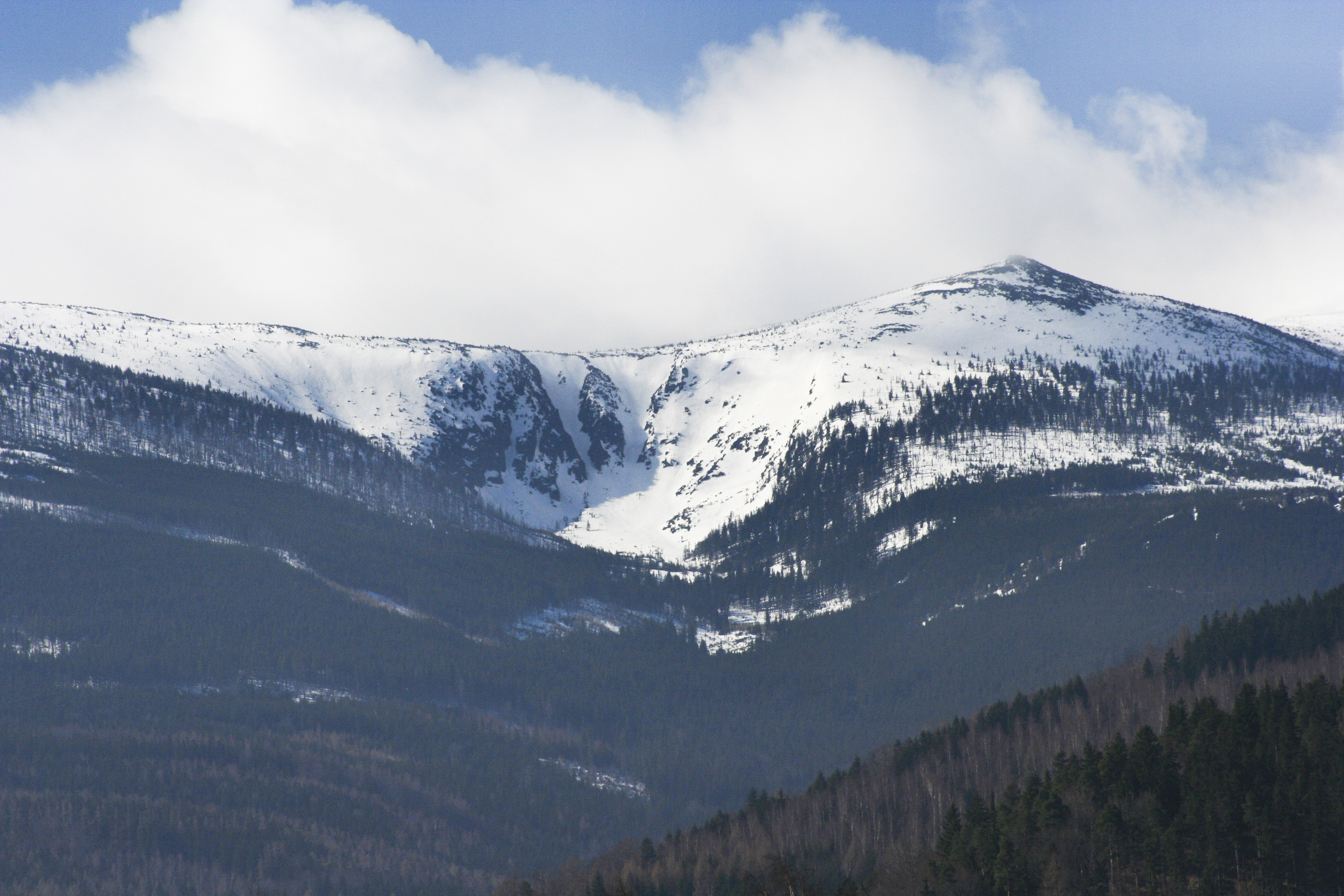
Śmielec and Czarny Kocioł Jagniątkowski
