= Rybnica, Karkonosze County =

Rybnica
- Village
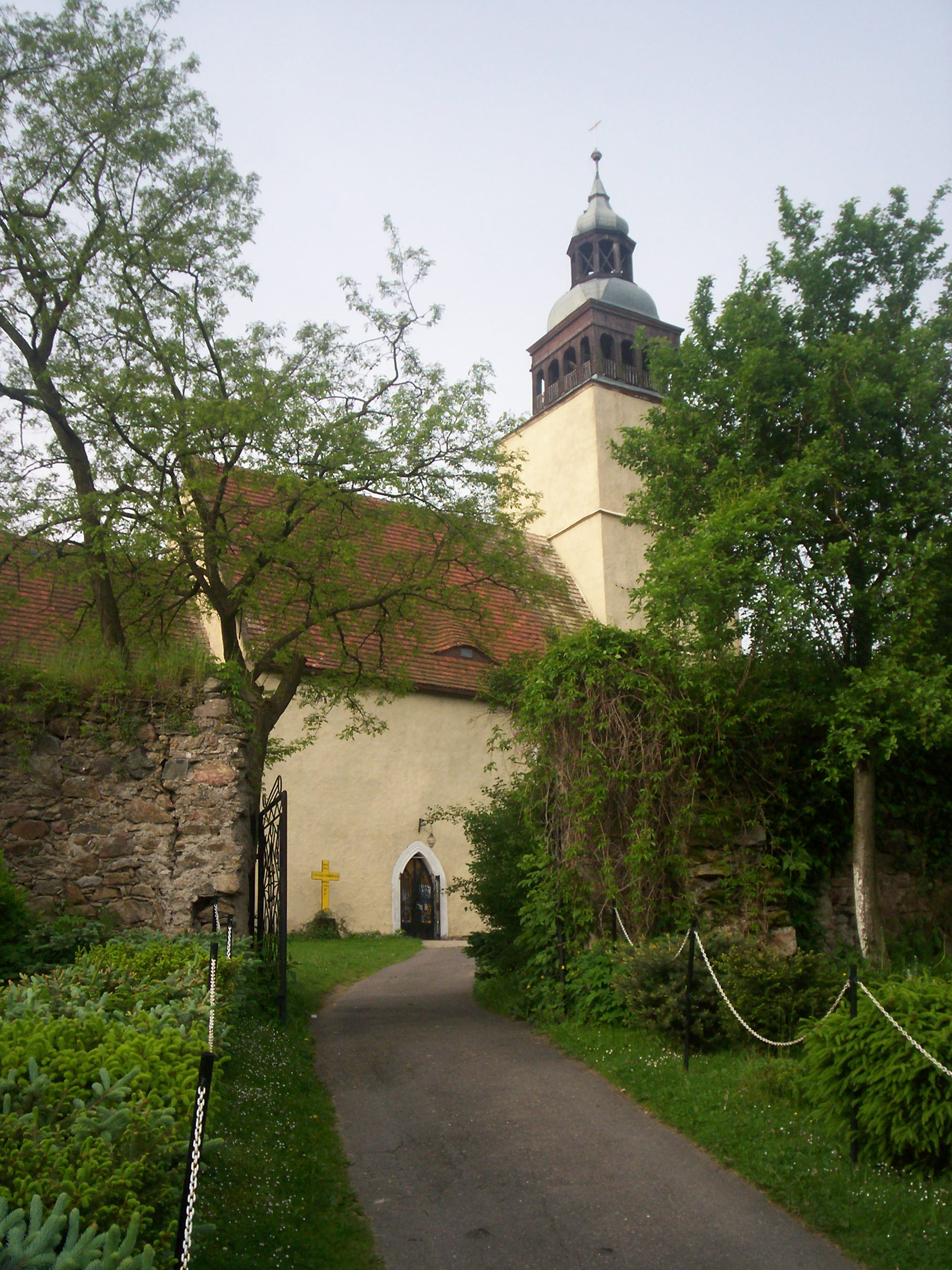
- Church of Saint Catherine

- Location within Poland
- Coordinates: 50°55′N 15°37′E
- Country: Poland
- Voivodeship: Lower Silesian
- County: Karkonosze
- Gmina: Stara Kamienica
- Time zone: UTC+1 (CET)
  - Summer (DST): UTC+2 (CEST)
- Vehicle registration: DJE

Rybnica [rɨbˈnit͡sa] (German: Reibnitz) is a village in the administrative district of Gmina Stara Kamienica, within Karkonosze County, Lower Silesian Voivodeship, in south-western Poland.

== History ==
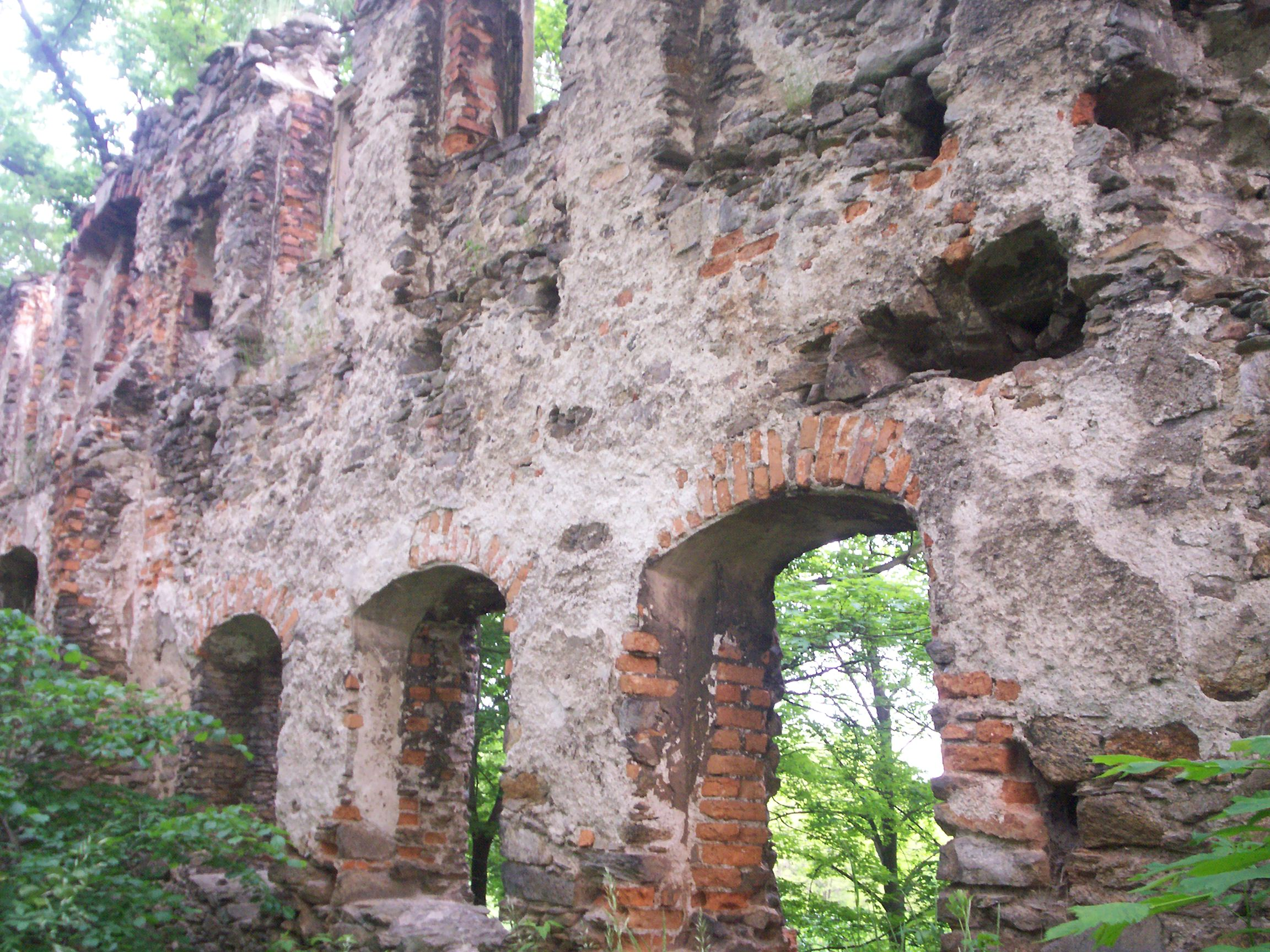
Medieval ruins of Rybnica castle

The name of the village is of Polish origin and comes from the word ryba, which means "fish". The oldest mention in documents comes from 1228, when part of fragmented Piast-ruled Poland.

A castle was built in the Middle Ages, which was part of a chain of castles protecting the southern Polish border and trade routes. Two trade routes of regional importance passed through the village in the late medieval and early modern periods, one connecting Wrocław, Bolków and Jelenia Góra with Gryfów, Lubań and Zgorzelec, and the other with Frýdlant and Zittau.

For centuries, the castle was the seat of the Reibnitz family, an ancient (uradel) Silesian noble family, whose most prominent scion is Princess Michael of Kent, member of the British royal family.

In the 1940s, several members of the Home Army resistance organization, fled persecution in Niedrzwica Duża and settled in Rybnica, where they continued their activities, and maintained contact with the resistance in nearby Jelenia Góra.

== Transport ==
The national road 30 passes through Rybnica, and there is a railway station in the village.
