= Rębiszów =

- Village
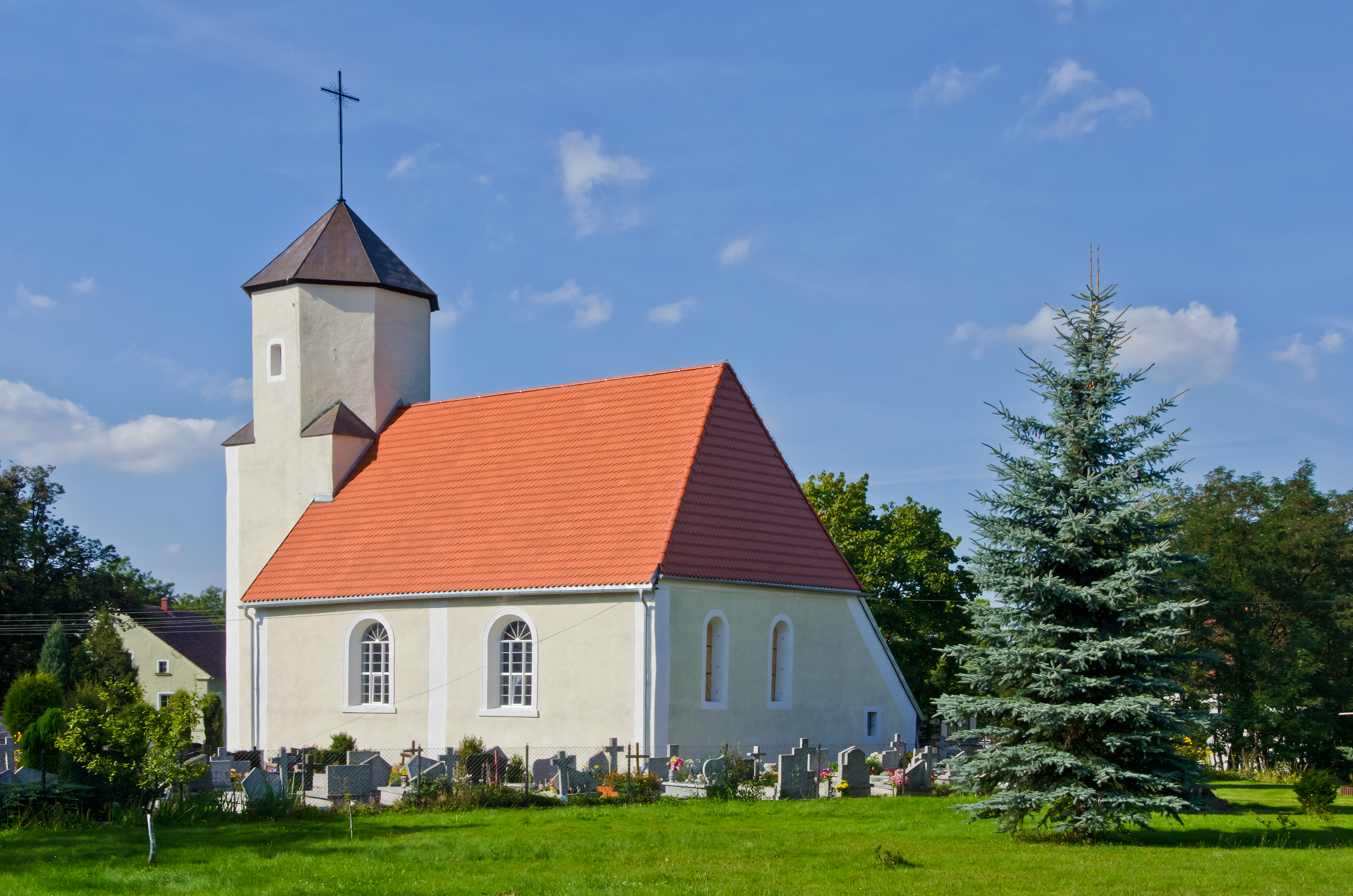
- Church of the Visitation of the Virgin Mary

- Location within Poland
- Coordinates: 50°57′03″N 15°26′57″E
- Country: Poland
- Voivodeship: Lower Silesian
- County: Lwówek
- Gmina: Mirsk

Population (2017)
  - Total: 703
- Time zone: UTC+1 (CET)
  - Summer (DST): UTC+2 (CEST)
- Area code: +48 75
- Vehicle registration: DLW

Rębiszów [rɛmˈbiʂuf] is a village in the administrative district of Gmina Mirsk, within Lwówek County, Lower Silesian Voivodeship, in south-western Poland, close to the Czech border.

There are two historic churches in Rębiszów: the Church of the Visitation, which dates back to the 16th century and the Saint Barbara church from the 18th century. There is also a train station in the village.

== History ==
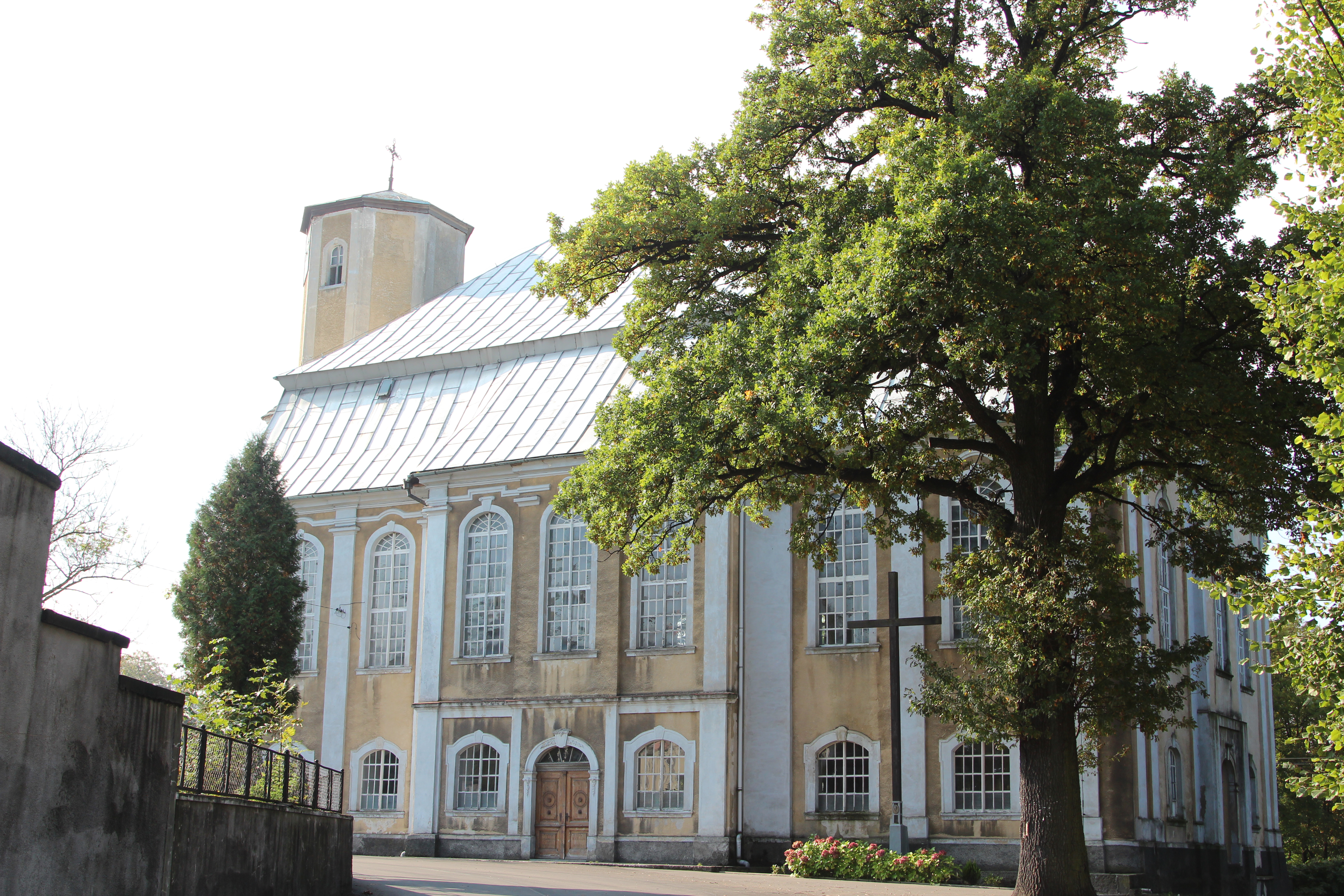
Saint Barbara church

The name of the village comes from the Polish word rąbać ("chop"), referring to chopping trees. Its oldest form was Rąbyn. In the Liber fundationis episcopatus Vratislaviensis from around 1300 the village was mentioned under the Latinized name Rabysow.

Later on, the village was also part of Bohemia (Czechia), Prussia and Germany. During World War II, the Germans created and operated the 11201 and E232 forced labour subcamps of the Stalag VIII-A and Stalag VIII-B/344 prisoner-of-war camps, respectively, at the local quarry. English, Yugoslav and French prisoners of war were held there. In the final stages of World War II, in January–February 1945, in the Rębiszów forest, the Germans carried out executions of forced laborers and prisoners of war, who were caught trying to escape from German labor camps.

== Sports ==
The local football club is Skalnik Rębiszów. It competes in the lower leagues.

== Transport ==
The village is served by Rębiszów railway station, which is served by regional Lower Silesian Railways services.
