= Kwieciszowice railway station =

Railway station in Kwieciszowice, south-western Poland

Kwieciszowice
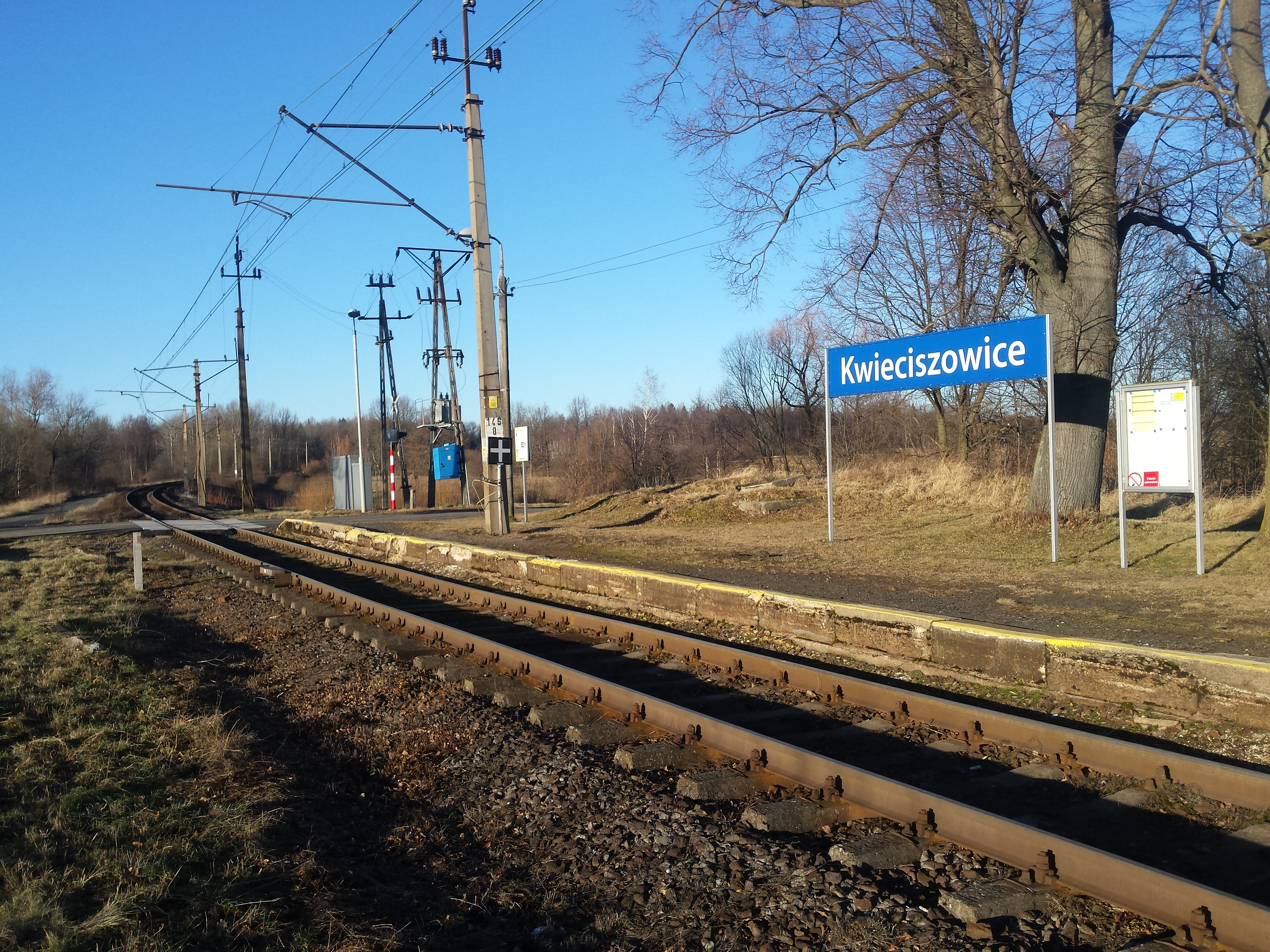
- Station in January 2017

General information
- Location: Kwieciszowice, Lower Silesian Voivodeship; Poland
- Coordinates: 50°55′29.1″N 15°30′09.1″E
- Owner: PKP Polskie Linie Kolejowe
- Line: Wrocław Świebodzki–Zgorzelec
- Platforms: 1

History
- Opened: 5 December 1905
- Former names: Blumendorf (1905–1945); Kwieciszewice (1945–1947)

Services
Preceding station	KD	Following station
Stara Kamienica towards Karpacz	D62	Rębiszów towards Görlitz
Location
- Location within Poland Location within Lower Silesian Voivodeship

Kwieciszowice is a railway station in the village of Kwieciszowice, Lwówek County within the Lower Silesian Voivodeship in south-western Poland.

== History ==
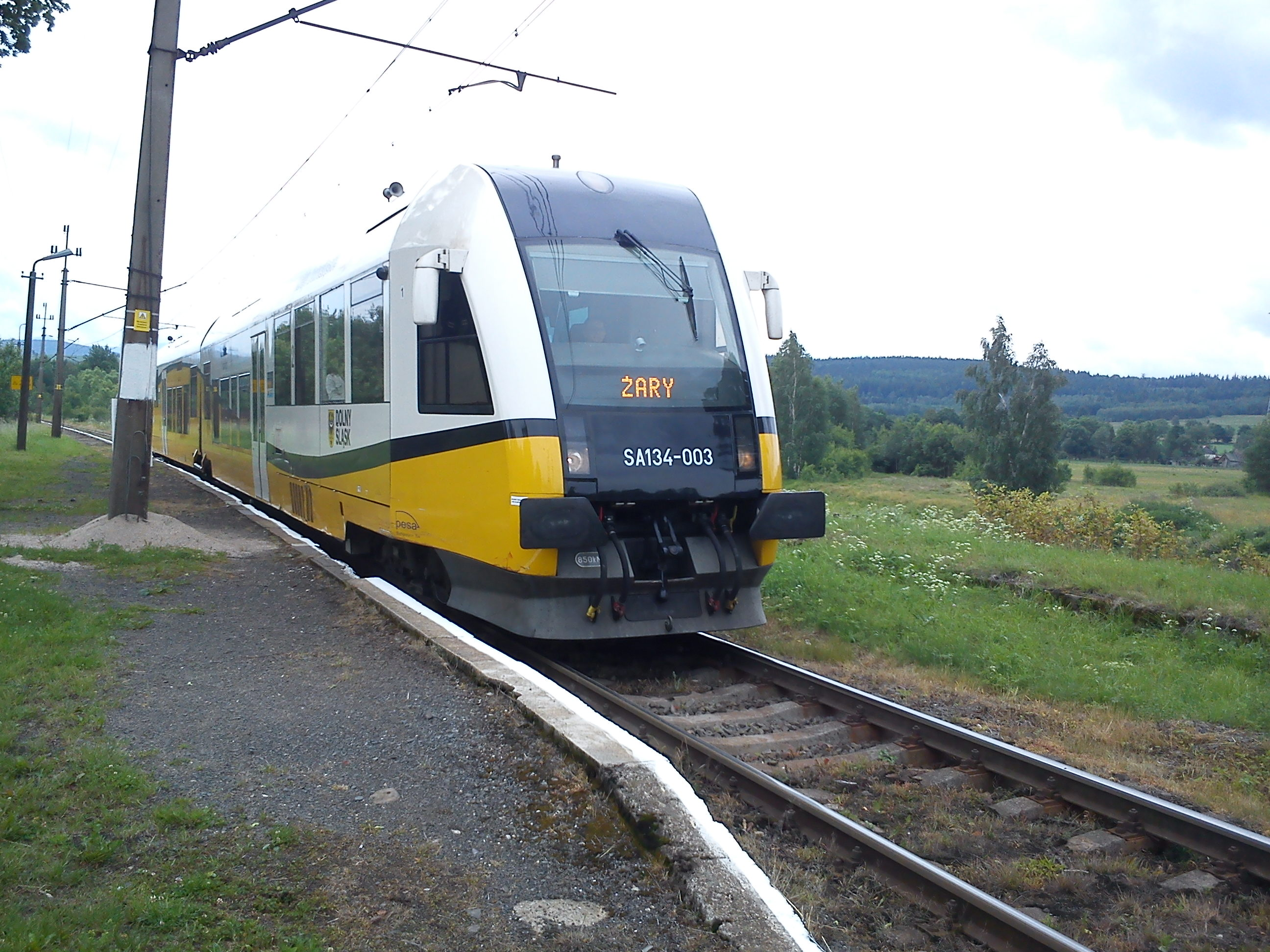
Lower Silesian Railways SA134 at the station bound for Żary in June 2012

The station was opened by Prussian State Railways as Blumendorf on 15 December 1902. After World War II, the area came under Polish administration. As a result, the station was taken over by Polish State Railways. It was renamed to Kwieciszewice in 1945, and eventually to its modern name, Kwieciszowice, in 1947.

A masonry-made building, dating back to the 19th century, was located at the station. It was demolished in 2008 after it fell into ruin.

== Train services ==
The station is a request stop of Lower Silesian Railways services.

The station is served by the following services:

- Regional services (KD) Karpacz / Świeradów-Zdrój - Gryfów Śląski - Görlitz
