= Kromnów, Lower Silesian Voivodeship =

Kromnów
- Village
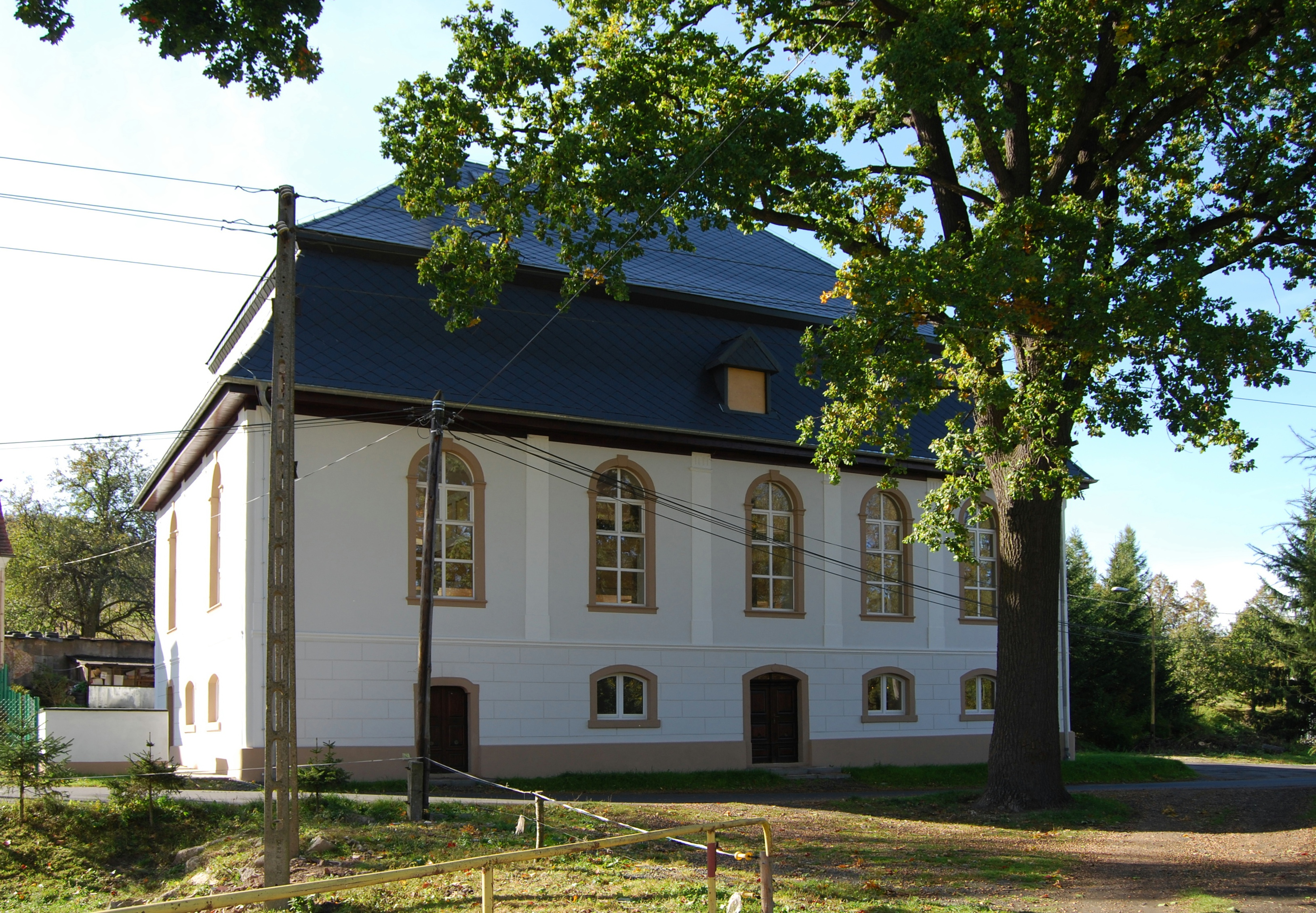
- Former evangelical church in Kromnów

- Location within Poland
- Coordinates: 50°53′35″N 15°35′04″E
- Country: Poland
- Voivodeship: Lower Silesian
- County: Karkonosze
- Gmina: Stara Kamienica
- Time zone: UTC+1 (CET)
  - Summer (DST): UTC+2 (CEST)
- Vehicle registration: DJE

Kromnów [ˈkrɔmnuf] is a village in the administrative district of Gmina Stara Kamienica, within Karkonosze County, Lower Silesian Voivodeship, in south-western Poland.
