= Stara Kamienica =

- Village
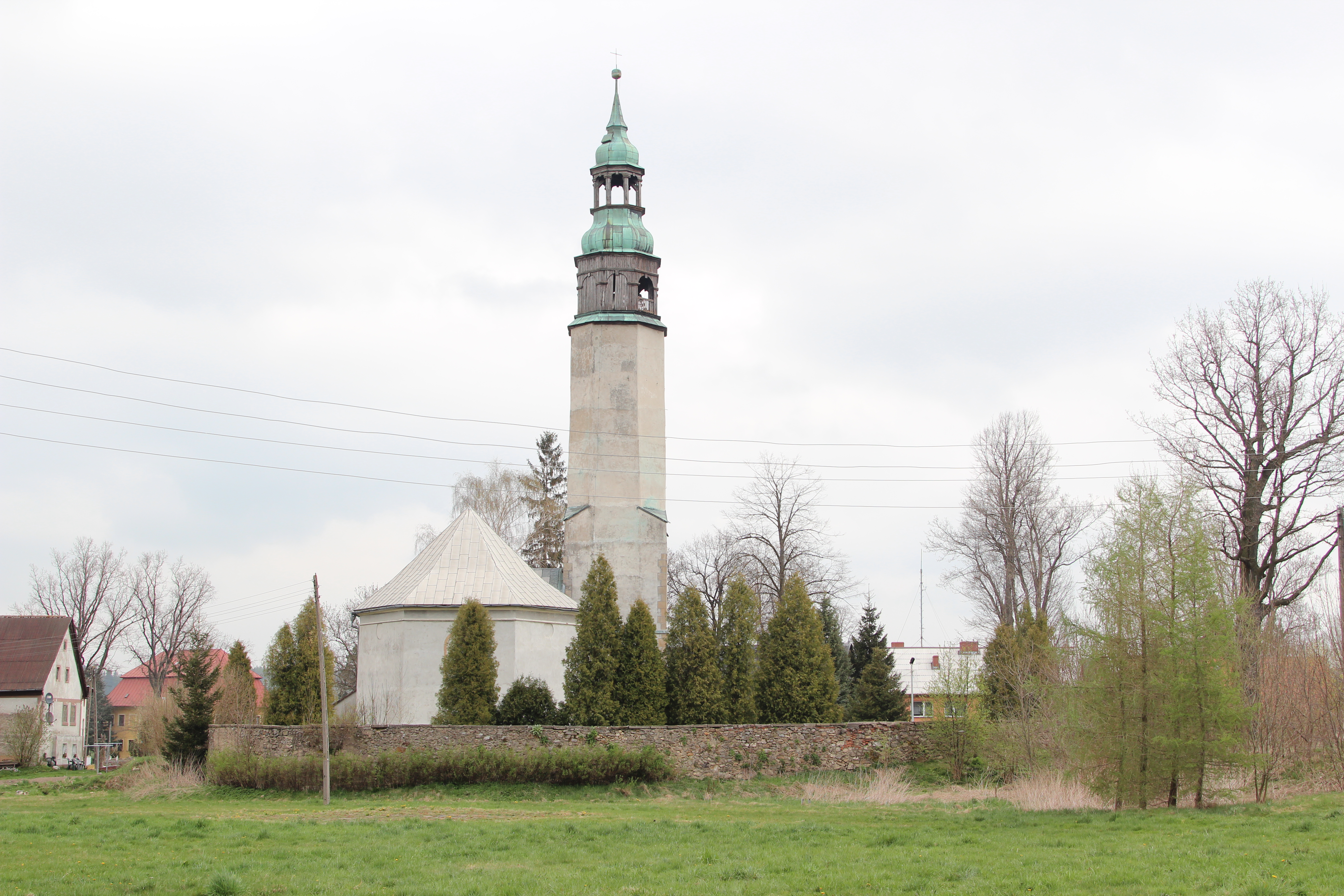
- Church of the Beheading of Saint John the Baptist

- Location within Poland
- Coordinates: 50°55′04″N 15°33′49″E
- Country: Poland
- Voivodeship: Lower Silesian
- County: Karkonosze
- Gmina: Stara Kamienica

Population
  - Total: 1,200
- Time zone: UTC+1 (CET)
  - Summer (DST): UTC+2 (CEST)
- Vehicle registration: DJE

Stara Kamienica [ˈstara kamjɛˈnit͡sa] is a village in Karkonosze County, Lower Silesian Voivodeship, in south-western Poland. It is the seat of the administrative district (gmina) called Gmina Stara Kamienica.

The name of the village is of Polish origin and is derived from the word kamień, which means "stone".

Two trade routes of regional importance passed through the village in the late medieval and early modern periods, one connecting Wrocław, Bolków and Jelenia Góra with Gryfów, Lubań and Zgorzelec, and the other with Frýdlant and Zittau.

There is a railway station in the village.
