= Piechowice =

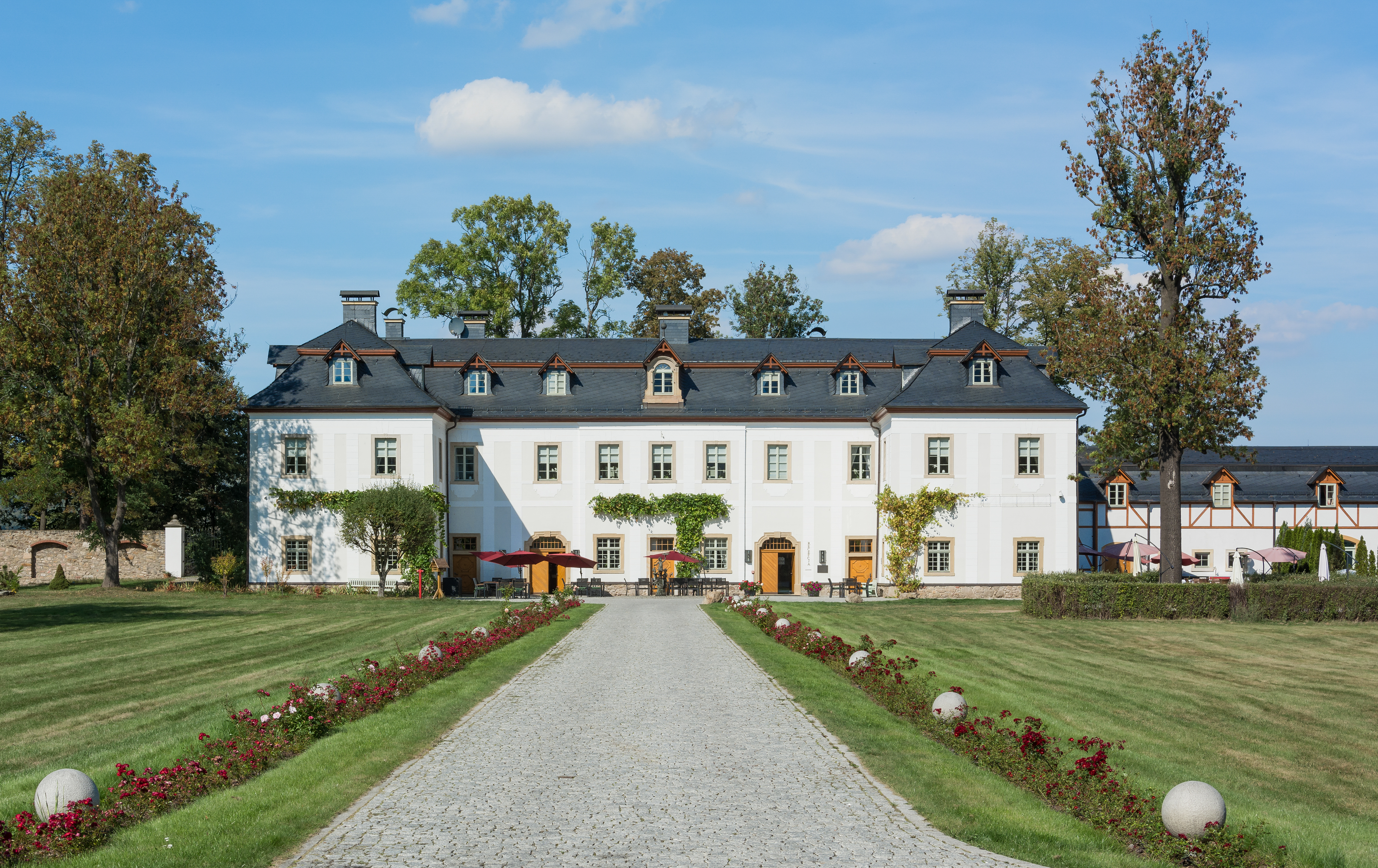
- Baroque palace

- Flag Coat of arms

- Location within Poland
- Coordinates: 50°51′20″N 15°37′08″E
- Country: Poland
- Voivodeship: Lower Silesian
- County: Karkonosze
- Gmina: Piechowice (urban gmina)
- First mentioned: 1305

Area
  - Total: 43.22 km^{2} (16.69 sq mi)
- Highest elevation: 480 m (1,570 ft)
- Lowest elevation: 360 m (1,180 ft)

Population (2024-12-31)
  - Total: 5,725
  - Density: 132.5/km^{2} (343.1/sq mi)
- Time zone: UTC+1 (CET)
  - Summer (DST): UTC+2 (CEST)
- Vehicle registration: DJE
- Website: http://www.piechowice.pl

Piechowice ([pʲɛxɔˈvʲit͡sɛ]; German: Petersdorf) is a town in Karkonosze County, Lower Silesian Voivodeship, in south-western Poland.

As of 2024, the town has a population of 5,725. It is 54th largest city in voivedeship.

== History ==
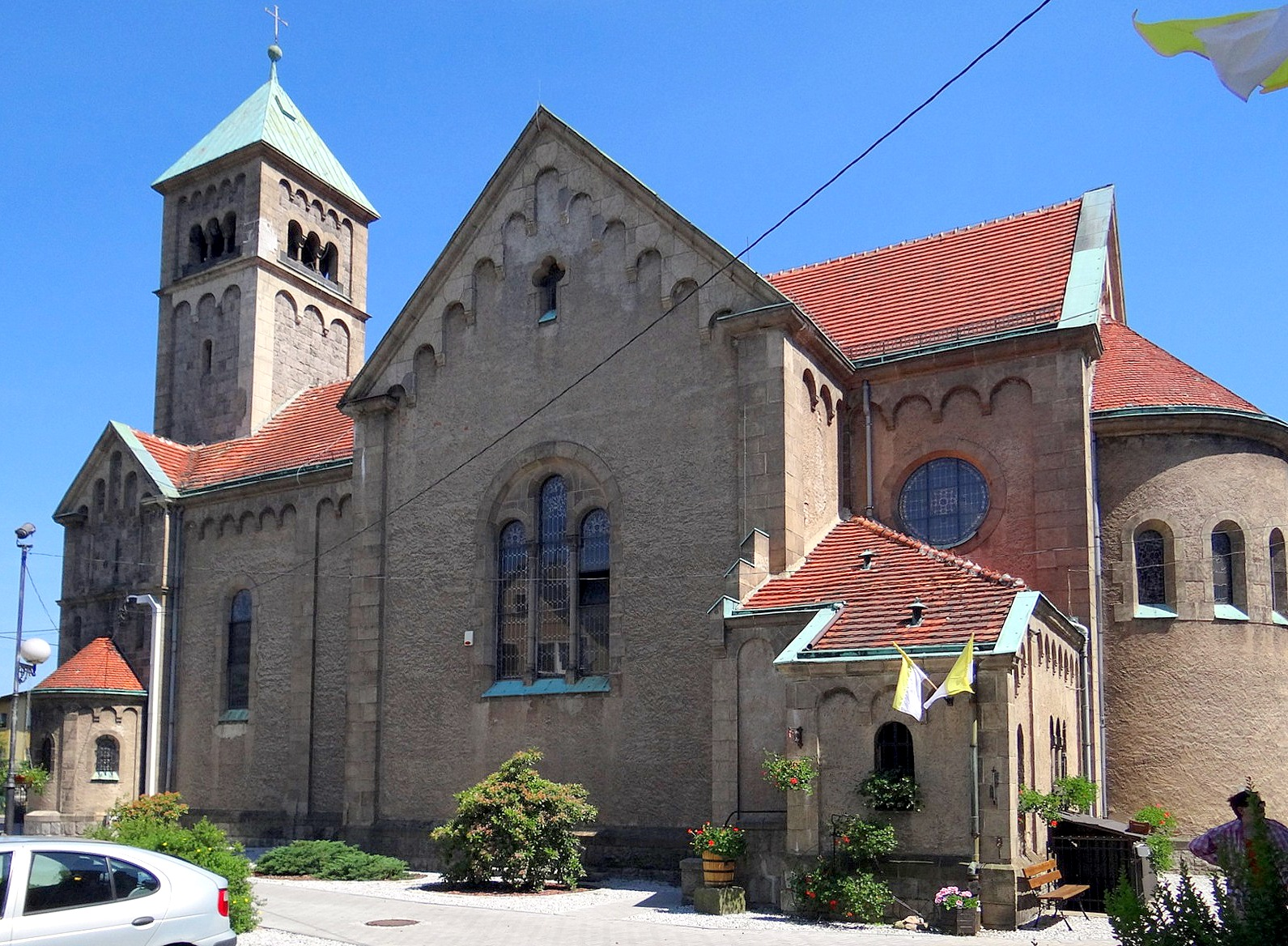
Saint Anthony church

The area became part of the emerging Polish state in the 10th century. Initially it was administratively part of the Wleń castellany. It was first mentioned in a document of the Wrocław cathedral chapter from 1305, when it was part of fragmented Piast-ruled Poland.

During the Thirty Years' War, Czech Protestant refugees founded the present-day district of Michałowice.

In 1891, a rail connection with Jelenia Góra was opened, and in 1902 a rail connection to Szklarska Poręba and Harrachov was opened.

During World War II, the German administration operated three forced labour camps in the town. The first camp was established in the winter of 1941–1942 and held Polish, French and Ukrainian prisoners, both men and women, the second was established in 1943 and held Italian prisoners-of-war, and the third was founded in 1944 and held Polish women and children. Conditions of all three camps were poor, the prisoners were subjected to mistreatment and abuse and several died, also by executions. Some Polish women and children were eventually relocated to forced labour camps in Jelenia Góra.

In 1961, town limits were expanded by including Górzyniec and Michałowice as new neighbourhoods.

== Transport ==
There are two railway stations in Piechowice, the main Piechowice station and the Górzyniec station in the Górzyniec district.

== Sights ==
Cultural heritage sights of Piechowice include the Baroque Pakoszów Palace, the Gothic-Baroque Corpus Christi church and the Romanesque Revival Saint Anthony of Padua church.

Natural sights within the town limits include the Szklarka Waterfall and the Wielki Szyszak mountain, the fourth highest peak of the Giant Mountains and the entire Sudetes. The Kochanówka mountain hut of the Polish Tourist and Sightseeing Society is located near the waterfall.

== Twin towns – sister cities ==
Piechowice is twinned with:

- Úpice, Czech Republic
