= Wielki Szyszak =

Mountain in Poland and the Czech Republic

Coordinates: 50°46′39″N 15°34′03″E

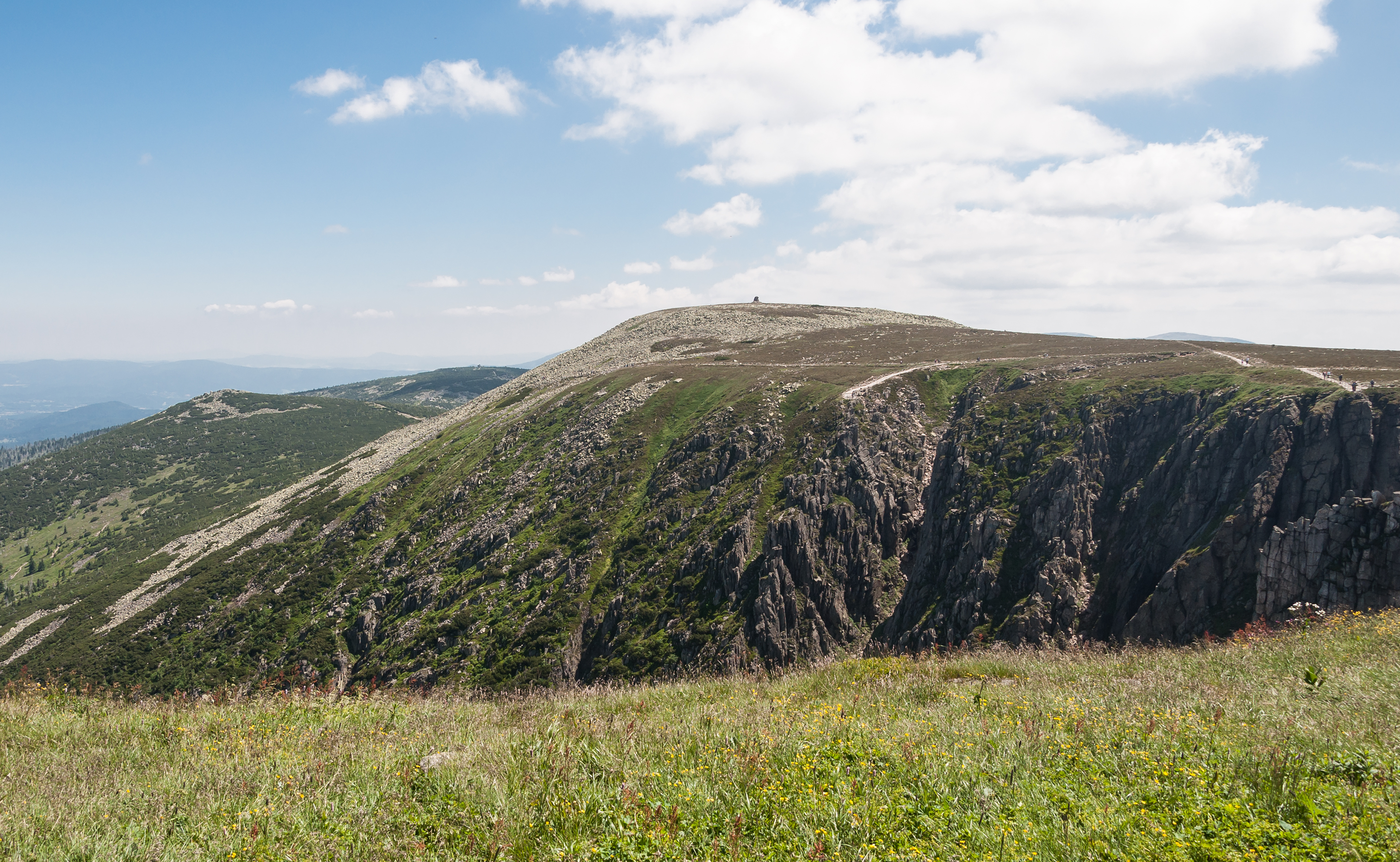

Highest point
- Elevation: 1,509 m (4,951 ft)
- Isolation: 9.19 km (5.71 mi) to Luční hora

Geography
- Location: Czech Republic / Poland
- Parent range: Giant Mountains

Wielki Szyszak (Czech: Vysoké kolo, German: Hohes Rad, literally High Wheel) is a mountain on the border between the Czech Republic and Poland. It is situated in the central (Silesian) part of the main mountain range of the Karkonosze, right above the village of Jagniątków. Its peak is at 1509 m above sea level. It is situated between Śnieżne Kotły and Śmielec.

Mount Wielki Szyszak is the tenth-highest mountain in the Czech Republic. There are numerous other peaks in the vicinity of Wielki Szyszak, such as Sokolnik, Violik, Velky Sisak, Kotel and Tvaroznik.

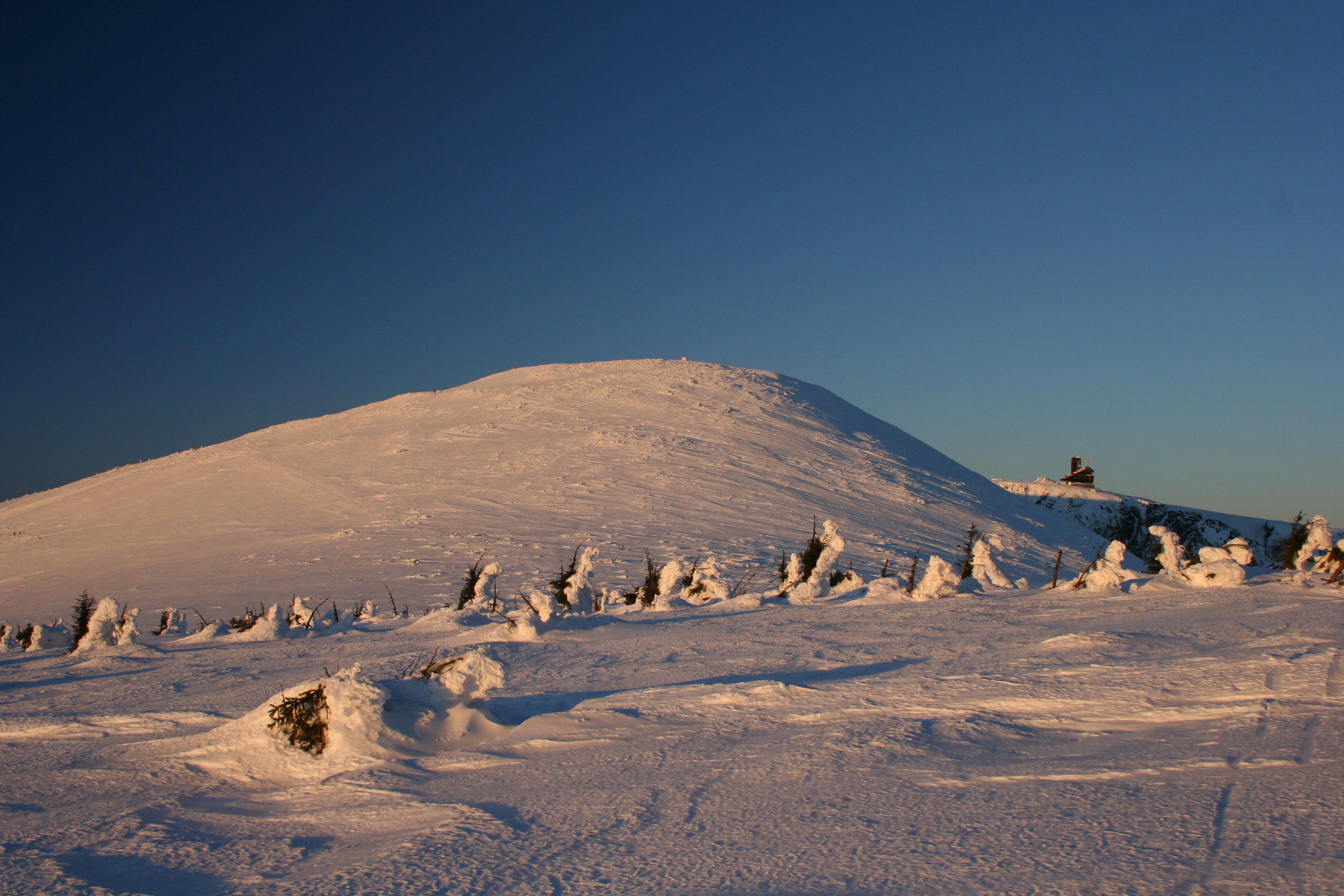
Sunrise on Wielki Szyszak view from Mountain Pass beneath Śmielec (Polish Przełęcz pod Śmielcem). Winter 2006.

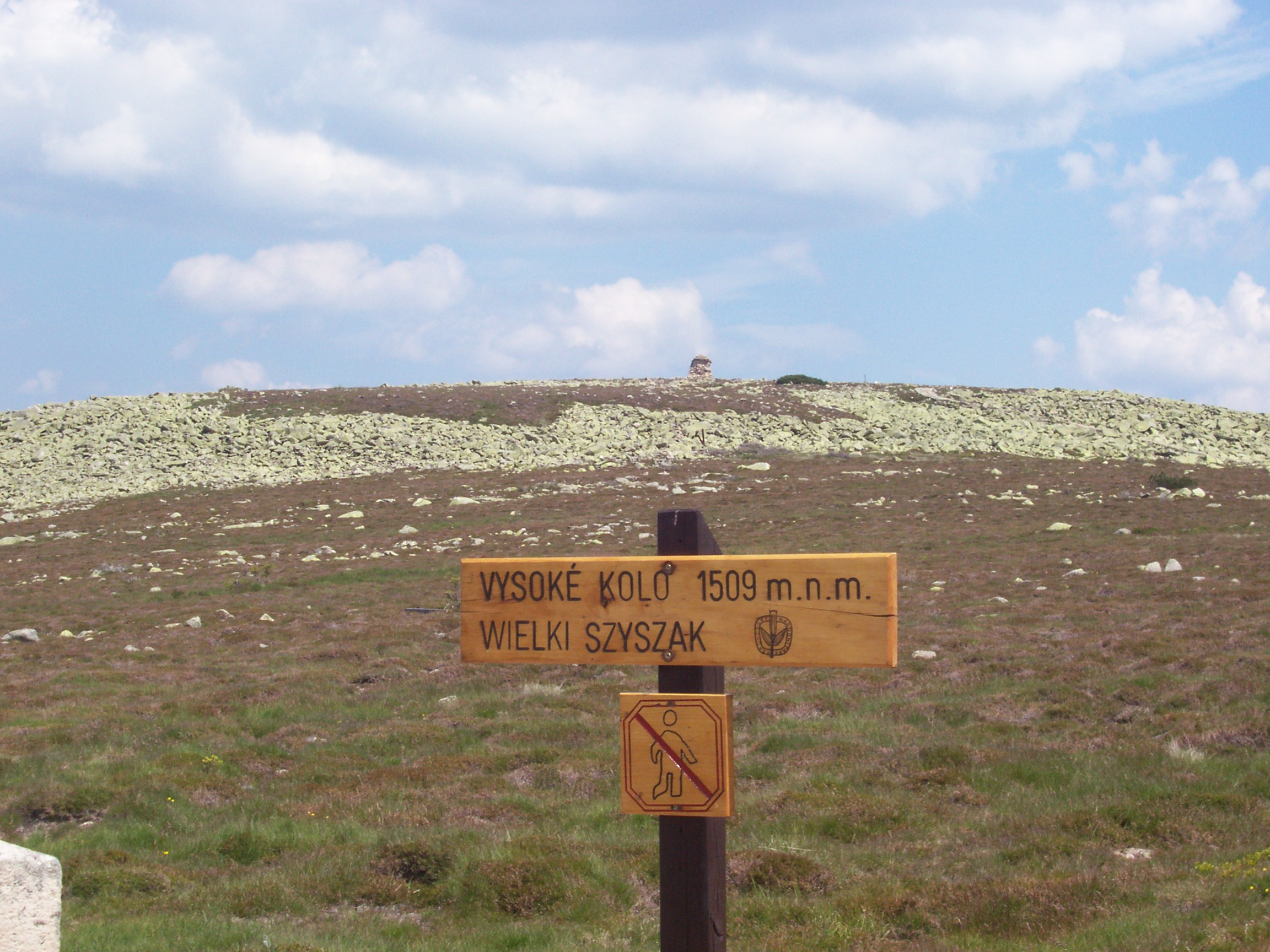
Sign on Wielki Szyszak showing its altitude.

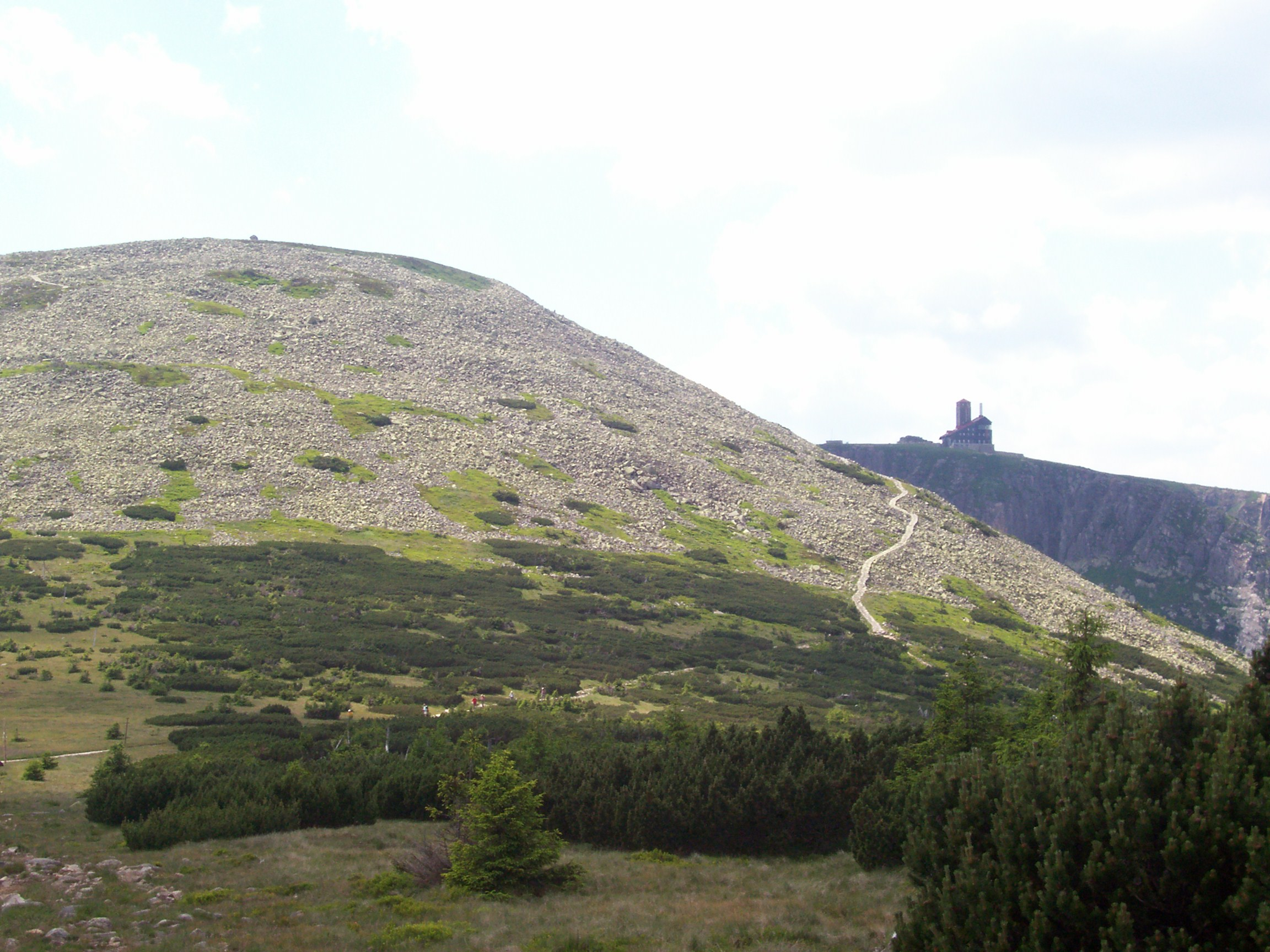
Wielki Szyszak in summer.

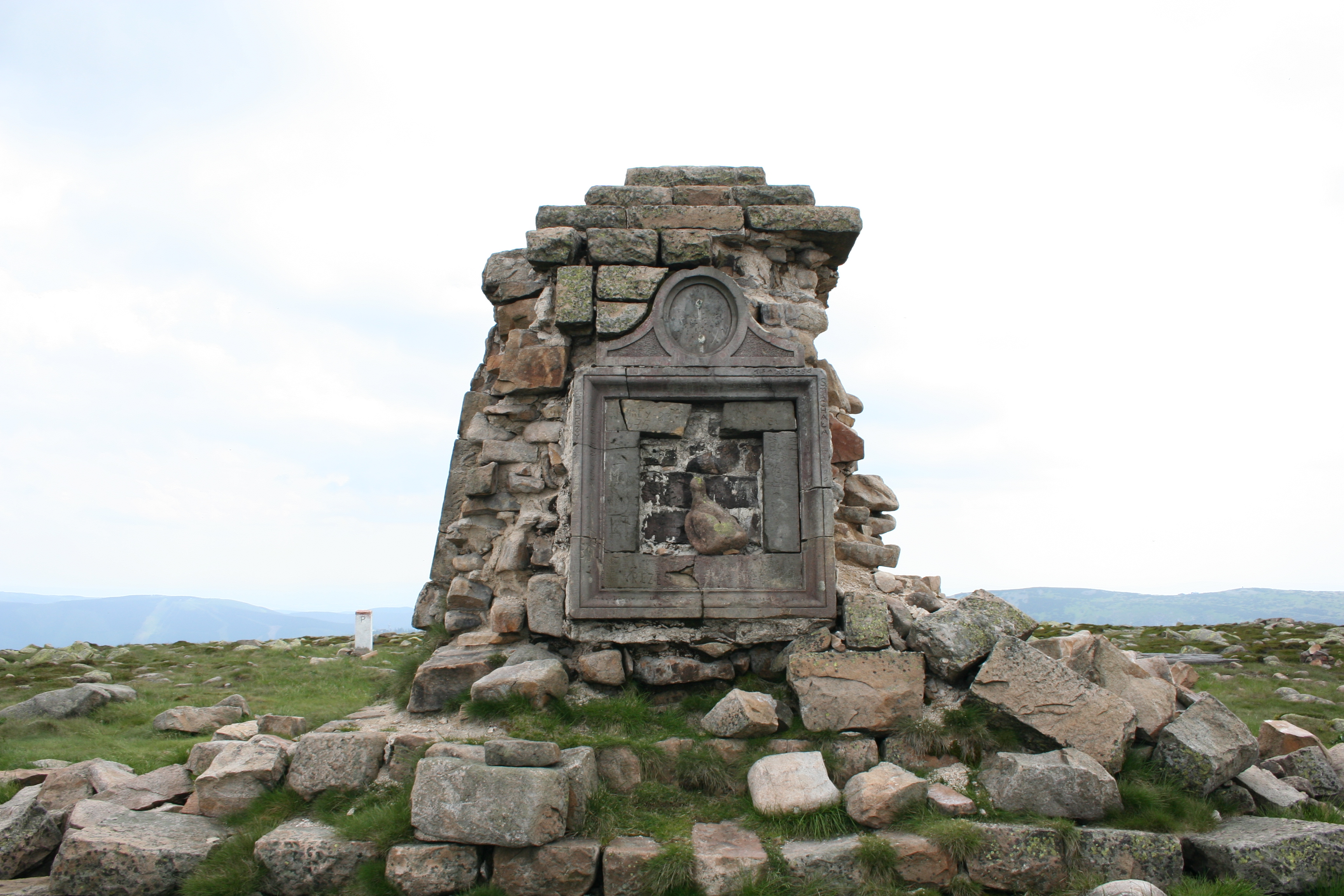
Remains of a monument to William I, German Emperor on Wielki Szyszak.
