= Karkonosze County =

Karkonosze County Powiat karkonoski
- County
- Flag Coat of arms

- Location within the voivodeship
- Coordinates: 50°54′13″N 15°43′58″E
- Country: Poland
- Voivodeship: Lower Silesian
- Seat: Jelenia Góra
- Gminas: Total 9 (incl. 4 urban): Karpacz; Kowary; Piechowice; Szklarska Poręba; Gmina Janowice Wielkie; Gmina Jeżów Sudecki; Gmina Myslakowice; Gmina Podgórzyn; Gmina Stara Kamienica

Area
  - Total: 628.21 km^{2} (242.55 sq mi)

Population (2019-06-30)
  - Total: 63,639
  - Density: 101.30/km^{2} (262.37/sq mi)
  - Urban: 28,213
  - Rural: 35,426
- Time zone: UTC+1 (CET)
  - Summer (DST): UTC+2 (CEST)
- Car plates: DJE
- Website: www.powiatkarkonoski.eu

Karkonosze County (Polish: powiat karkonoski) is a unit of territorial administration and local government (powiat) in Lower Silesian Voivodeship, south-western Poland. It came into being on January 1, 1999, as a result of the Polish local government reforms passed in 1998.

The county covers an area of 628.2 square kilometres (242.5 sq mi). Its administrative seat is the city of Jelenia Góra, although this city is not part of the county (it forms a separate city county, which is an enclave within Karkonosze County). There are four towns within the county: Karpacz, Szklarska Poręba, Kowary and Piechowice. The first two of these are major ski resorts.

As at 2019 the total population of the county is 63,639, out of which the population of the towns totals 28,213 and the rural population is 35,426.

Until July 2020 it was named Jelenia Góra County (Polish: powiat jeleniogórski). The change formally took effect on January 1, 2021. The current name references the Karkonosze Mountains.

== Neighbouring counties ==
Apart from the city of Jelenia Góra, Karkonosze County is bordered by Lwówek County and Złotoryja County to the north, and Jawor County and Kamienna Góra County to the east. It also borders the Czech Republic to the south and west.

== Administrative divisions ==
The county is subdivided into nine gminas (four urban and five rural). These are listed in the following table, in descending order of population.

Gmina	Type	Area (km^{2})	Population (2019)	Seat
Kowary	urban	37.4	10,869	
Gmina Mysłakowice	rural	88.8	10,160	Mysłakowice
Gmina Podgórzyn	rural	82.5	8,260	Podgórzyn
Gmina Jeżów Sudecki	rural	94.4	7,438	Jeżów Sudecki
Szklarska Poręba	urban	75.4	6,557	
Piechowice	urban	43.2	6,194	
Gmina Stara Kamienica	rural	110.5	5,266	Stara Kamienica
Karpacz	urban	38.0	4,593	
Gmina Janowice Wielkie	rural	58.1	4,302	Janowice Wielkie
