= Žernov =

Žernov may refer to places in the Czech Republic:

- Žernov (Náchod District), a market town in the Hradec Králové Region
- Žernov (Semily District), a municipality and village in the Liberec Region

== See also ==
- Zernov (surname)
