= Pohoří =

Pohoří may refer to places in the Czech Republic:

- Pohoří (Prague-West District), a municipality and village in the Central Bohemian Region
- Pohoří (Rychnov nad Kněžnou District), a municipality and village in the Hradec Králové Region
- Pohoří, a village and part of Jistebnice in the South Bohemian Region
- Pohoří, a village and part of Malečov in the Ústí nad Labem Region
- Pohoří, a village and part of Mišovice in the South Bohemian Region
- Pohoří, a village and part of Olešnice (Semily District) in the Liberec Region
- Pohoří, a village and part of Plánice in the Plzeň Region
- Pohoří, a village and part of Pluhův Žďár in the South Bohemian Region
- Pohoří, a village and part of Stružinec in the Liberec Region
- Pohoří na Šumavě, a hamlet and part of Pohorská Ves in the South Bohemian Region
