= Bystrá nad Jizerou =

- Municipality
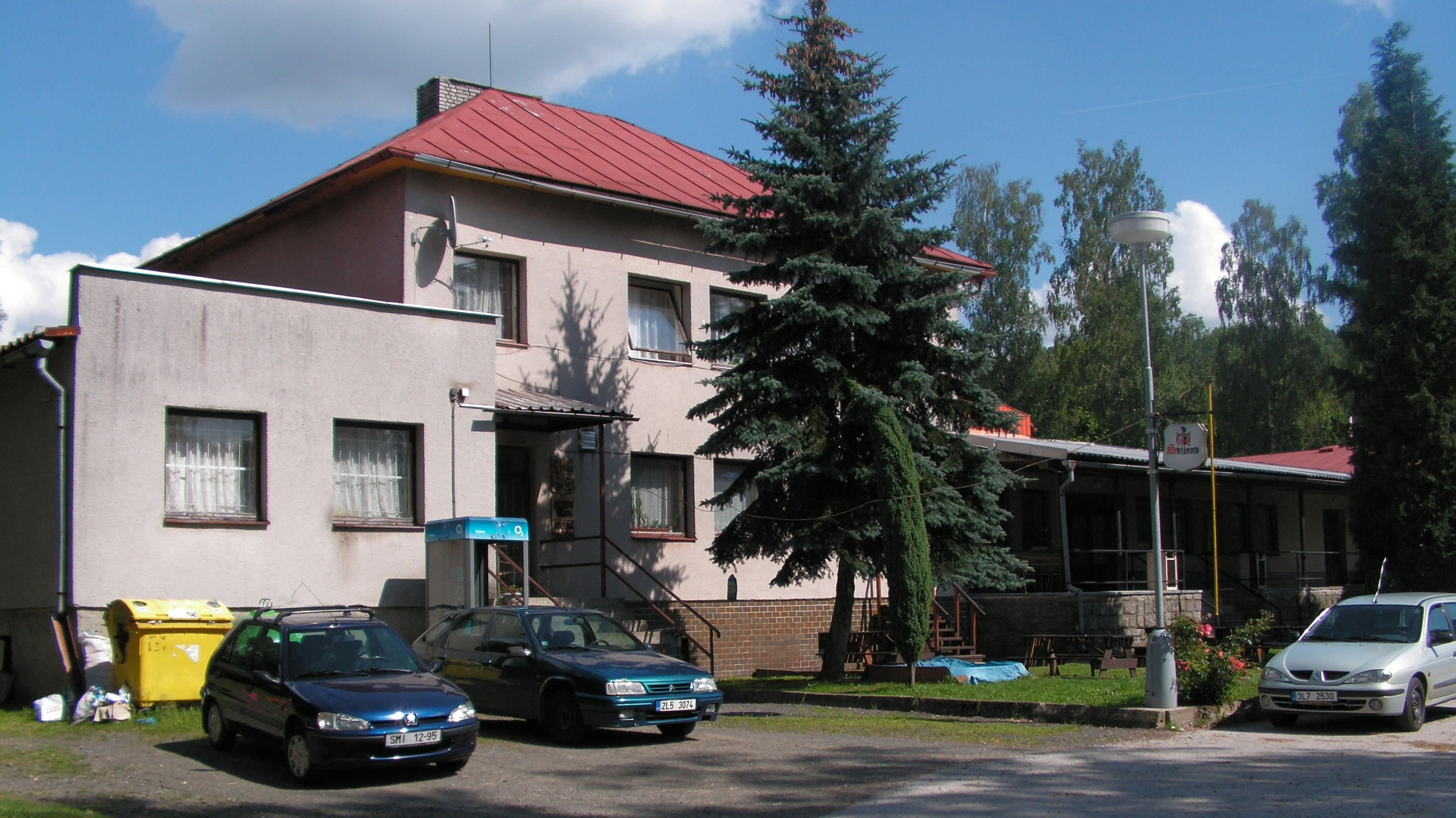
- Municipal office

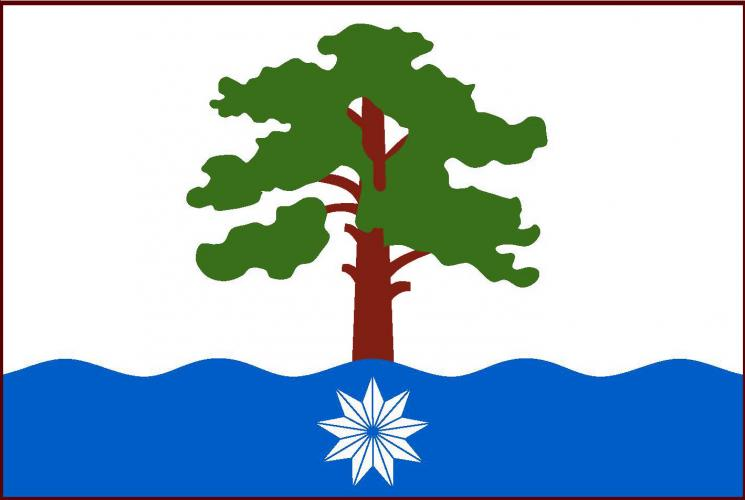
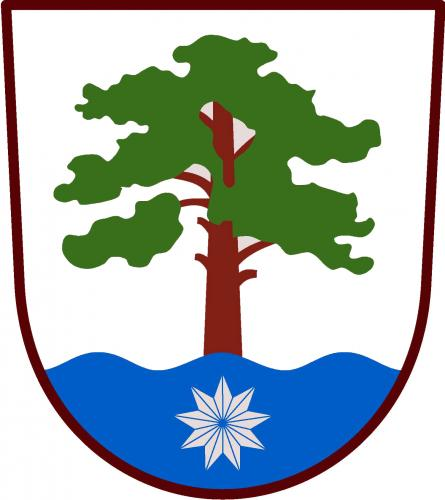
- Flag Coat of arms

- Location in the Czech Republic
- Coordinates: 50°36′17″N 15°24′7″E
- Country: Czech Republic
- Region: Liberec
- District: Semily
- First mentioned: 1320

Area
  - Total: 5.62 km^{2} (2.17 sq mi)
- Elevation: 468 m (1,535 ft)

Population (2026-01-01)
  - Total: 117
  - Density: 20.8/km^{2} (53.9/sq mi)
- Time zone: UTC+1 (CET)
  - Summer (DST): UTC+2 (CEST)
- Postal code: 513 01
- Website: www.bystranadjizerou.cz

Bystrá nad Jizerou is a municipality and village in Semily District in the Liberec Region of the Czech Republic. It has about 100 inhabitants.

== Demographics ==
Historical population
Year	Pop.	±%
1869	621	—
1880	638	+2.7%
1890	600	−6.0%
1900	535	−10.8%
1910	512	−4.3%
1921	516	+0.8%
1930	471	−8.7%
1950	292	−38.0%
1961	278	−4.8%
1970	233	−16.2%
1980	187	−19.7%
1991	149	−20.3%
2001	122	−18.1%
2011	116	−4.9%
2021	126	+8.6%
Source: Censuses
