= Radostná pod Kozákovem =

- Municipality
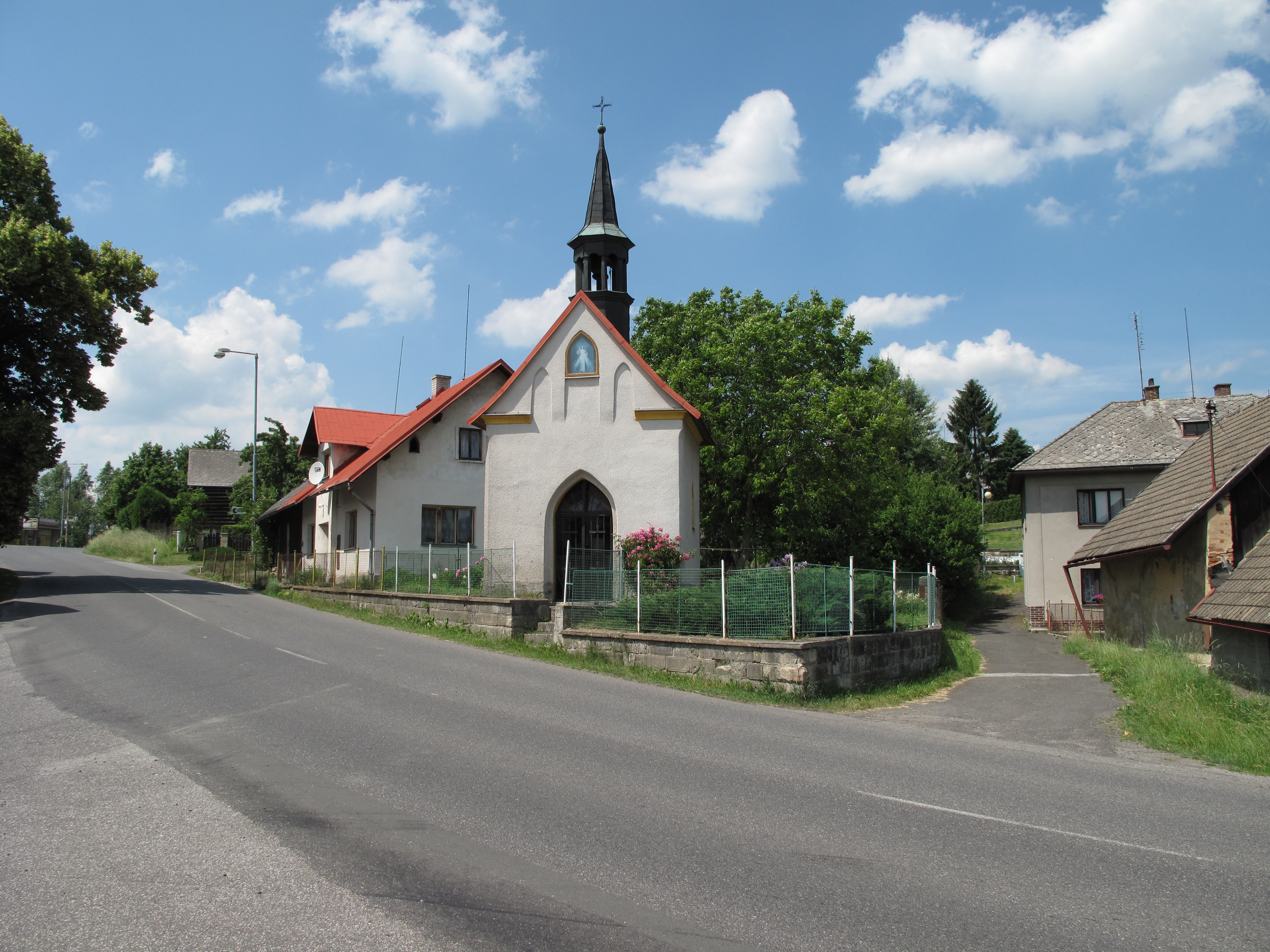
- Chapel in Lestkov

- Location in the Czech Republic
- Coordinates: 50°34′39″N 15°14′45″E
- Country: Czech Republic
- Region: Liberec
- District: Semily
- First mentioned: 1403

Area
  - Total: 5.68 km^{2} (2.19 sq mi)
- Elevation: 396 m (1,299 ft)

Population (2026-01-01)
  - Total: 436
  - Density: 76.8/km^{2} (199/sq mi)
- Time zone: UTC+1 (CET)
  - Summer (DST): UTC+2 (CEST)
- Postal code: 512 63
- Website: radostna.cz

Radostná pod Kozákovem is a municipality in Semily District in the Liberec Region of the Czech Republic. It has about 400 inhabitants.

== Administrative division ==
Radostná pod Kozákovem consists of three municipal parts (in brackets population according to the 2021 census):

- Kozákov (72)
- Lestkov (284)
- Volavec (88)

== Demographics ==
Historical population
Year	Pop.	±%
1869	738	—
1880	822	+11.4%
1890	858	+4.4%
1900	844	−1.6%
1910	770	−8.8%
1921	719	−6.6%
1930	688	−4.3%
1950	525	−23.7%
1961	520	−1.0%
1970	453	−12.9%
1980	431	−4.9%
1991	385	−10.7%
2001	352	−8.6%
2011	405	+15.1%
2021	444	+9.6%
Source: Censuses
