= Benešov u Semil =

- Municipality
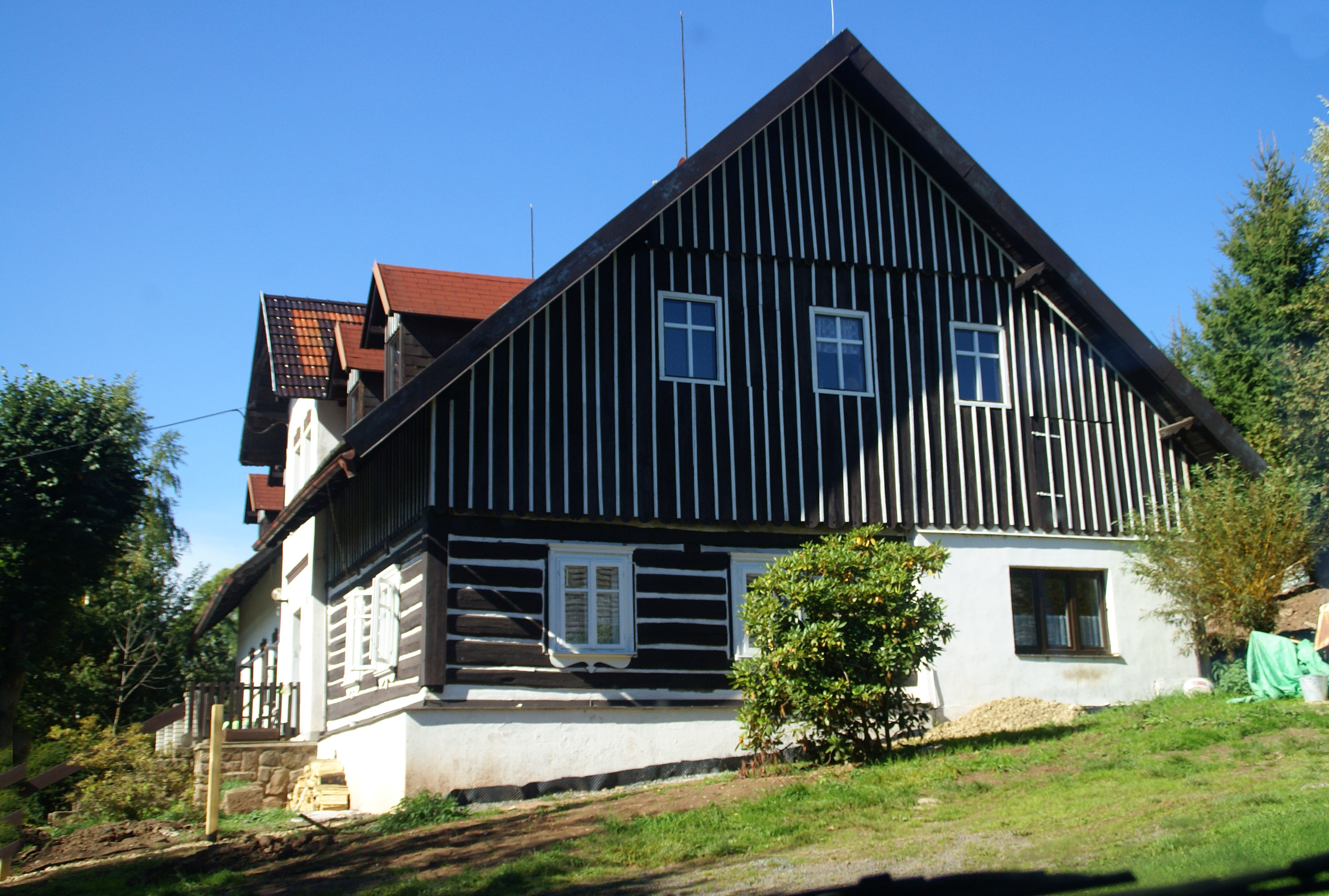
- Timber-framed house in the village

- Flag Coat of arms

- Location in the Czech Republic
- Coordinates: 50°36′12″N 15°22′6″E
- Country: Czech Republic
- Region: Liberec
- District: Semily
- First mentioned: 1411

Area
  - Total: 5.39 km^{2} (2.08 sq mi)
- Elevation: 352 m (1,155 ft)

Population (2026-01-01)
  - Total: 866
  - Density: 161/km^{2} (416/sq mi)
- Time zone: UTC+1 (CET)
  - Summer (DST): UTC+2 (CEST)
- Postal code: 512 06
- Website: www.benesovusemil.cz

Benešov u Semil is a municipality and village in Semily District in the Liberec Region of the Czech Republic. It has about 900 inhabitants.

== Demographics ==
Historical population
| Year | Pop. | ±% |
|---|---|---|
| 1869 | 789 | — |
| 1880 | 922 | +16.9% |
| 1890 | 1,164 | +26.2% |
| 1900 | 1,274 | +9.5% |
| 1910 | 1,652 | +29.7% |
| 1921 | 1,459 | −11.7% |
| 1930 | 1,525 | +4.5% |
| 1950 | 1,055 | −30.8% |
| 1961 | 1,047 | −0.8% |
| 1970 | 923 | −11.8% |
| 1980 | 839 | −9.1% |
| 1991 | 695 | −17.2% |
| 2001 | 850 | +22.3% |
| 2011 | 827 | −2.7% |
| 2021 | 802 | −3.0% |
Source: Censuses
