= Veselá (Semily District) =

- Municipality
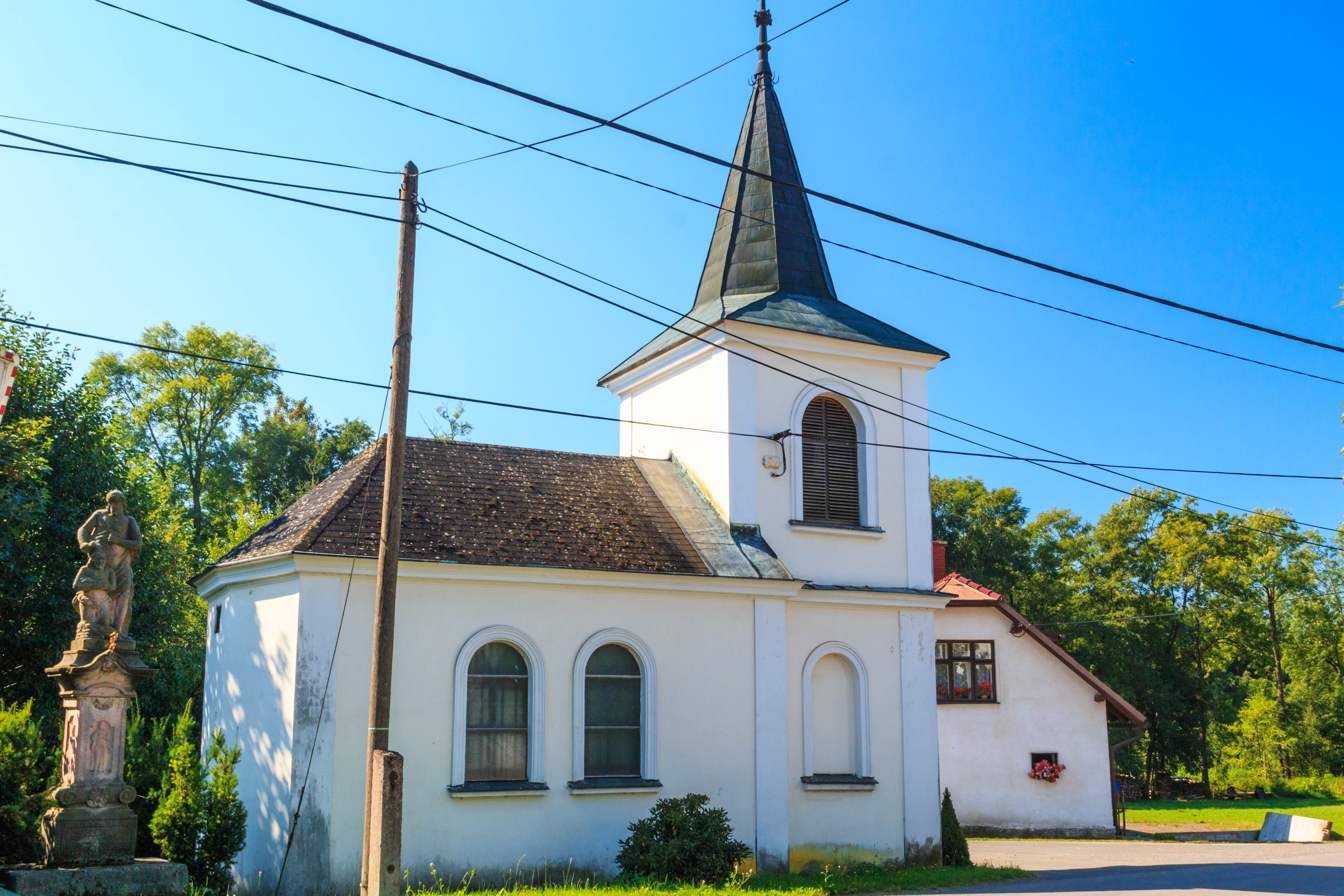
- Chapel of Saint John the Baptist

- Location in the Czech Republic
- Coordinates: 50°32′48″N 15°18′32″E
- Country: Czech Republic
- Region: Liberec
- District: Semily
- First mentioned: 1654

Area
  - Total: 5.78 km^{2} (2.23 sq mi)
- Elevation: 369 m (1,211 ft)

Population (2026-01-01)
  - Total: 235
  - Density: 40.7/km^{2} (105/sq mi)
- Time zone: UTC+1 (CET)
  - Summer (DST): UTC+2 (CEST)
- Postal codes: 512 52, 512 63
- Website: www.veselaobec.cz

Veselá is a municipality and village in Semily District in the Liberec Region of the Czech Republic. It has about 200 inhabitants.

== Administrative division ==
Veselá consists of five municipal parts (in brackets population according to the 2021 census):

- Veselá (117)
- Bítouchov (3)
- Kotelsko (70)
- Vranovsko (12)
- Žďár (30)

== Demographics ==
Historical population
Year	Pop.	±%
1869	782	—
1880	724	−7.4%
1890	777	+7.3%
1900	722	−7.1%
1910	674	−6.6%
1921	611	−9.3%
1930	524	−14.2%
1950	318	−39.3%
1961	329	+3.5%
1970	263	−20.1%
1980	264	+0.4%
1991	225	−14.8%
2001	219	−2.7%
2011	206	−5.9%
2021	232	+12.6%
Source: Censuses
