= Čistá u Horek =

- Municipality
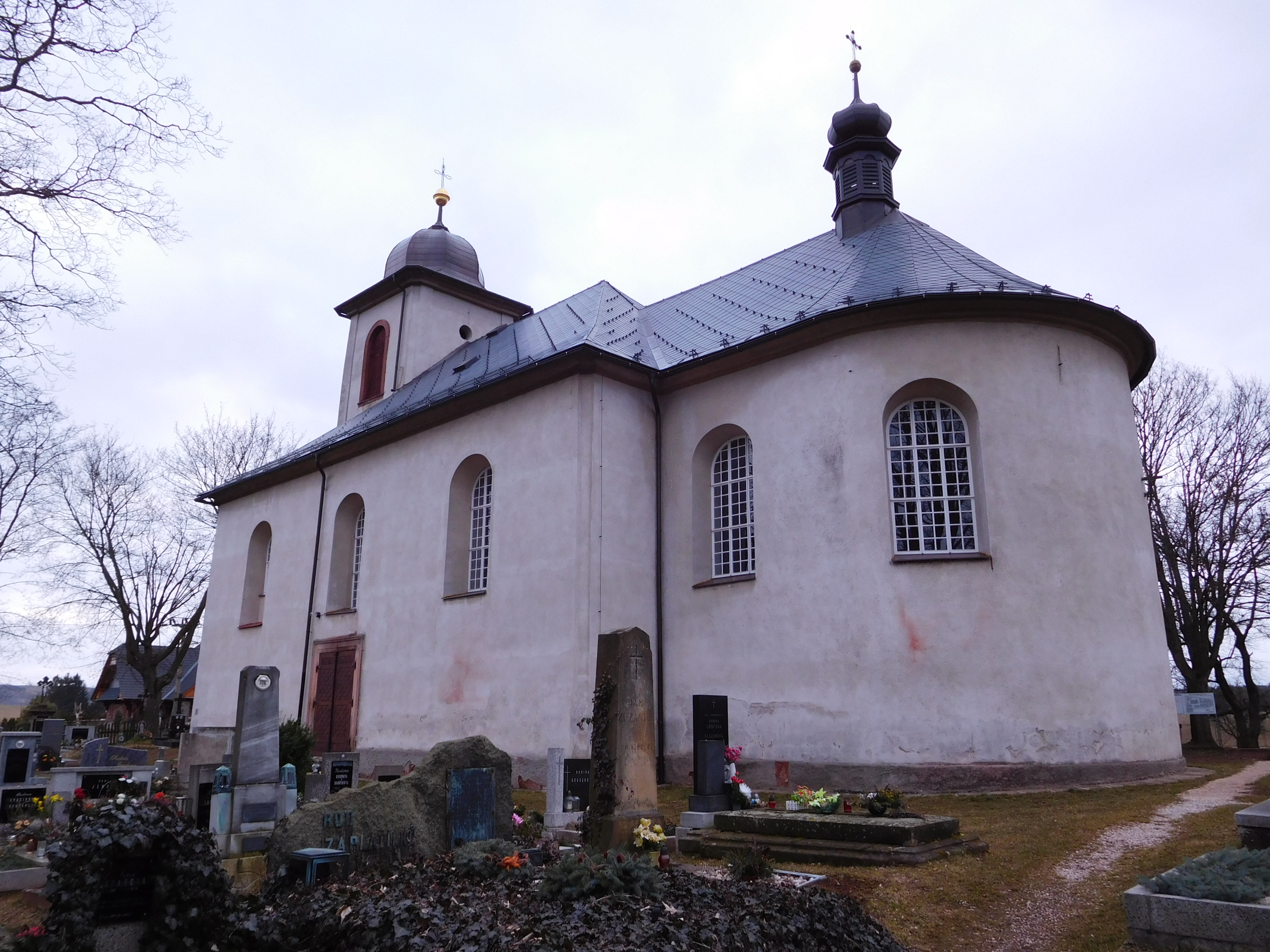
- Church of Saint Procopius

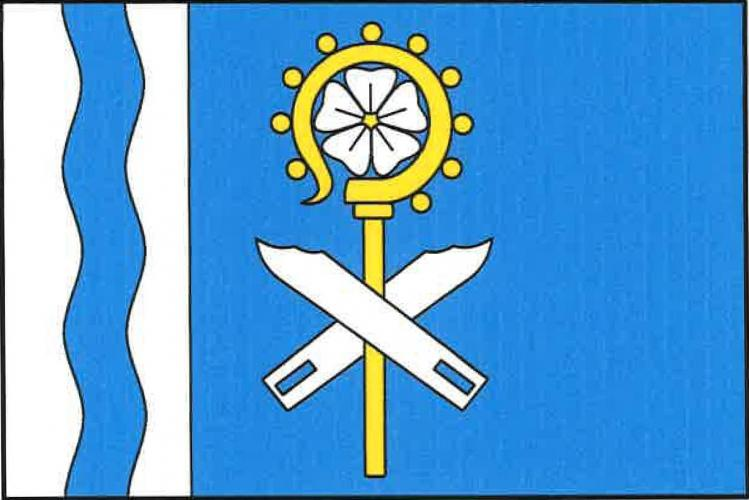
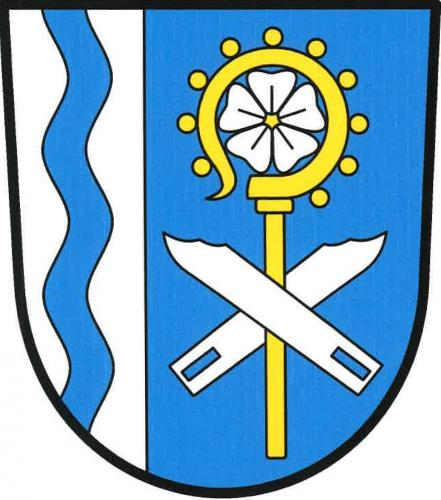
- Flag Coat of arms

- Location in the Czech Republic
- Coordinates: 50°31′54″N 15°36′27″E
- Country: Czech Republic
- Region: Liberec
- District: Semily
- First mentioned: 1369

Area
  - Total: 10.53 km^{2} (4.07 sq mi)
- Elevation: 422 m (1,385 ft)

Population (2026-01-01)
  - Total: 591
  - Density: 56.1/km^{2} (145/sq mi)
- Time zone: UTC+1 (CET)
  - Summer (DST): UTC+2 (CEST)
- Postal code: 512 35
- Website: www.cistauhorek.cz

Čistá u Horek is a municipality and village in Semily District in the Liberec Region of the Czech Republic. It has about 600 inhabitants.

== Demographics ==
Historical population
Year	Pop.	±%
1869	1,709	—
1880	1,454	−14.9%
1890	1,426	−1.9%
1900	1,423	−0.2%
1910	1,396	−1.9%
1921	1,186	−15.0%
1930	1,126	−5.1%
1950	758	−32.7%
1961	725	−4.4%
1970	698	−3.7%
1980	615	−11.9%
1991	516	−16.1%
2001	546	+5.8%
2011	535	−2.0%
2021	563	+5.2%
Source: Censuses
