= Všeň =

- Municipality
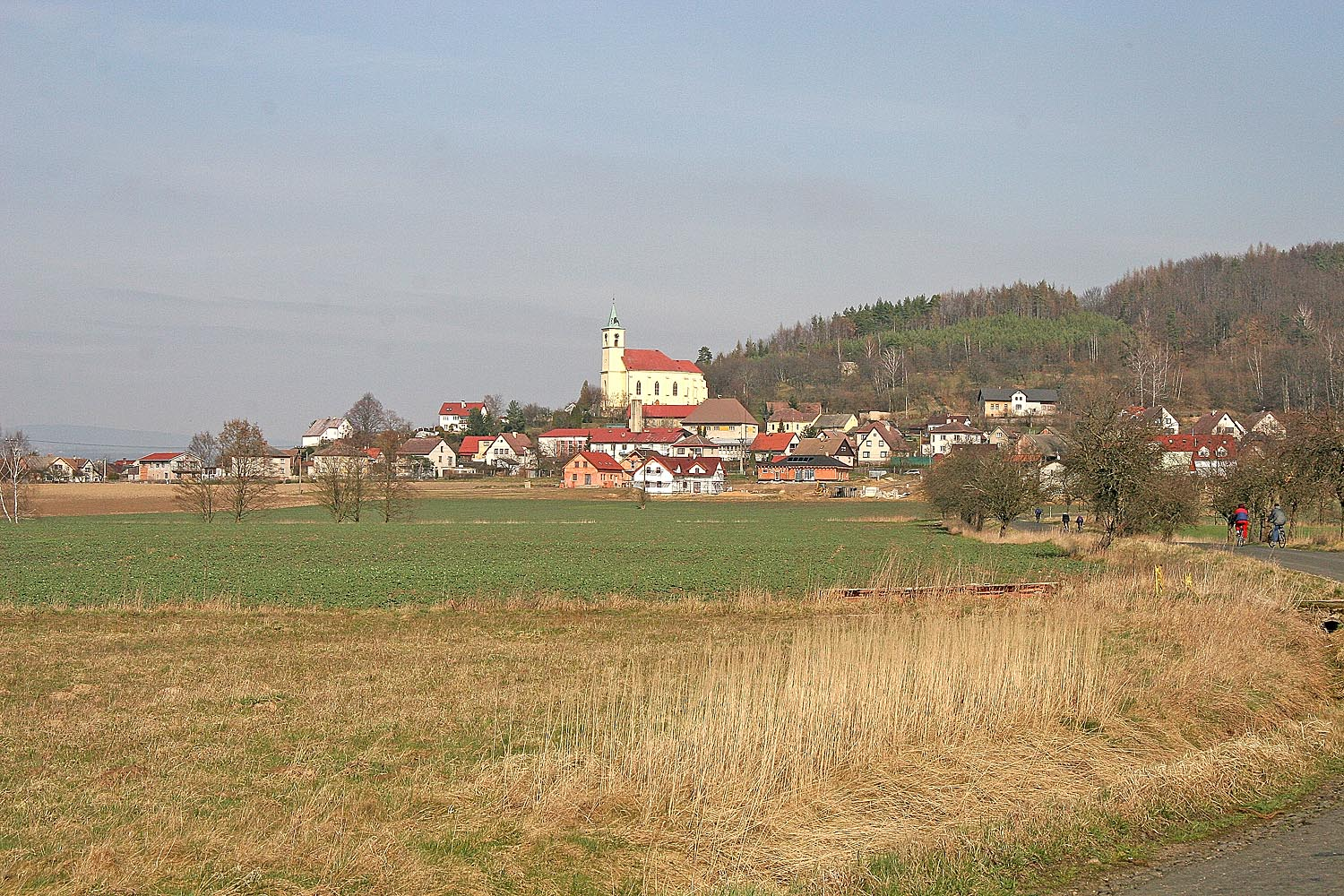
- General view

- Flag Coat of arms

- Location in the Czech Republic
- Coordinates: 50°33′27″N 15°6′19″E
- Country: Czech Republic
- Region: Liberec
- District: Semily
- First mentioned: 1318

Area
  - Total: 5.61 km^{2} (2.17 sq mi)
- Elevation: 272 m (892 ft)

Population (2026-01-01)
  - Total: 612
  - Density: 109/km^{2} (283/sq mi)
- Time zone: UTC+1 (CET)
  - Summer (DST): UTC+2 (CEST)
- Postal codes: 511 01, 512 65
- Website: vsen.cz

Všeň is a municipality and village in Semily District in the Liberec Region of the Czech Republic. It has about 600 inhabitants.

== Administrative division ==
Všeň consists of three municipal parts (in brackets population according to the 2021 census):

- Všeň (398)
- Mokrý (103)
- Ploukonice (93)

== Demographics ==
Historical population
Year	Pop.	±%
1869	648	—
1880	676	+4.3%
1890	736	+8.9%
1900	716	−2.7%
1910	756	+5.6%
1921	714	−5.6%
1930	743	+4.1%
1950	614	−17.4%
1961	614	+0.0%
1970	555	−9.6%
1980	512	−7.7%
1991	493	−3.7%
2001	524	+6.3%
2011	586	+11.8%
2021	594	+1.4%
Source: Censuses

== Twin towns – sister cities ==
Všeň is twinned with:

- Ledro, Italy
