= Svojek =

- Municipality
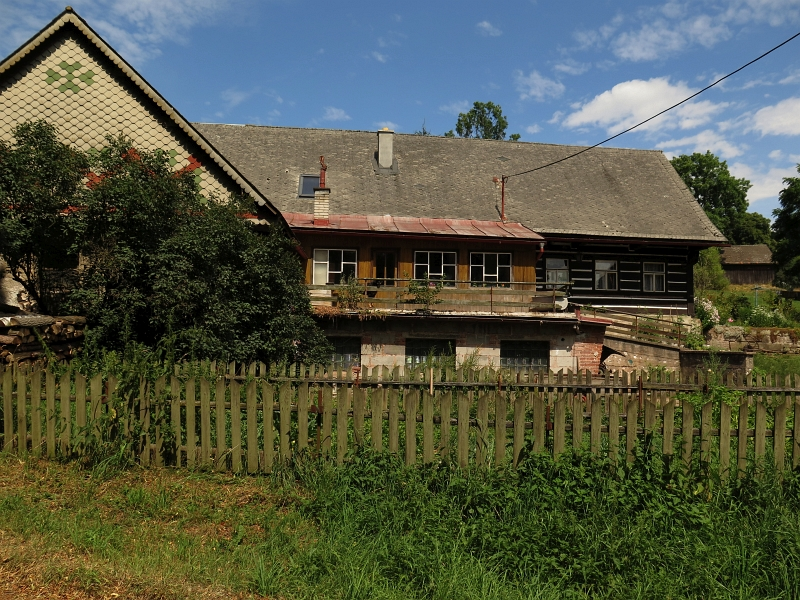
- A homestead in Svojek

- Flag Coat of arms

- Location in the Czech Republic
- Coordinates: 50°33′12″N 15°27′20″E
- Country: Czech Republic
- Region: Liberec
- District: Semily
- First mentioned: 1401

Area
  - Total: 5.38 km^{2} (2.08 sq mi)
- Elevation: 427 m (1,401 ft)

Population (2026-01-01)
  - Total: 179
  - Density: 33.3/km^{2} (86.2/sq mi)
- Time zone: UTC+1 (CET)
  - Summer (DST): UTC+2 (CEST)
- Postal code: 507 91
- Website: www.svojek.cz

Svojek is a municipality and village in Semily District in the Liberec Region of the Czech Republic. It has about 200 inhabitants.

== Administrative division ==
Svojek consists of two municipal parts (in brackets population according to the 2021 census):

- Svojek (99)
- Tample (62)

== Demographics ==
Historical population
Year	Pop.	±%
1869	887	—
1880	872	−1.7%
1890	812	−6.9%
1900	861	+6.0%
1910	773	−10.2%
1921	644	−16.7%
1930	617	−4.2%
1950	361	−41.5%
1961	320	−11.4%
1970	236	−26.2%
1980	232	−1.7%
1991	191	−17.7%
2001	185	−3.1%
2011	155	−16.2%
2021	161	+3.9%
Source: Censuses
