= Semily District =

Semily District Okres Semily
- District
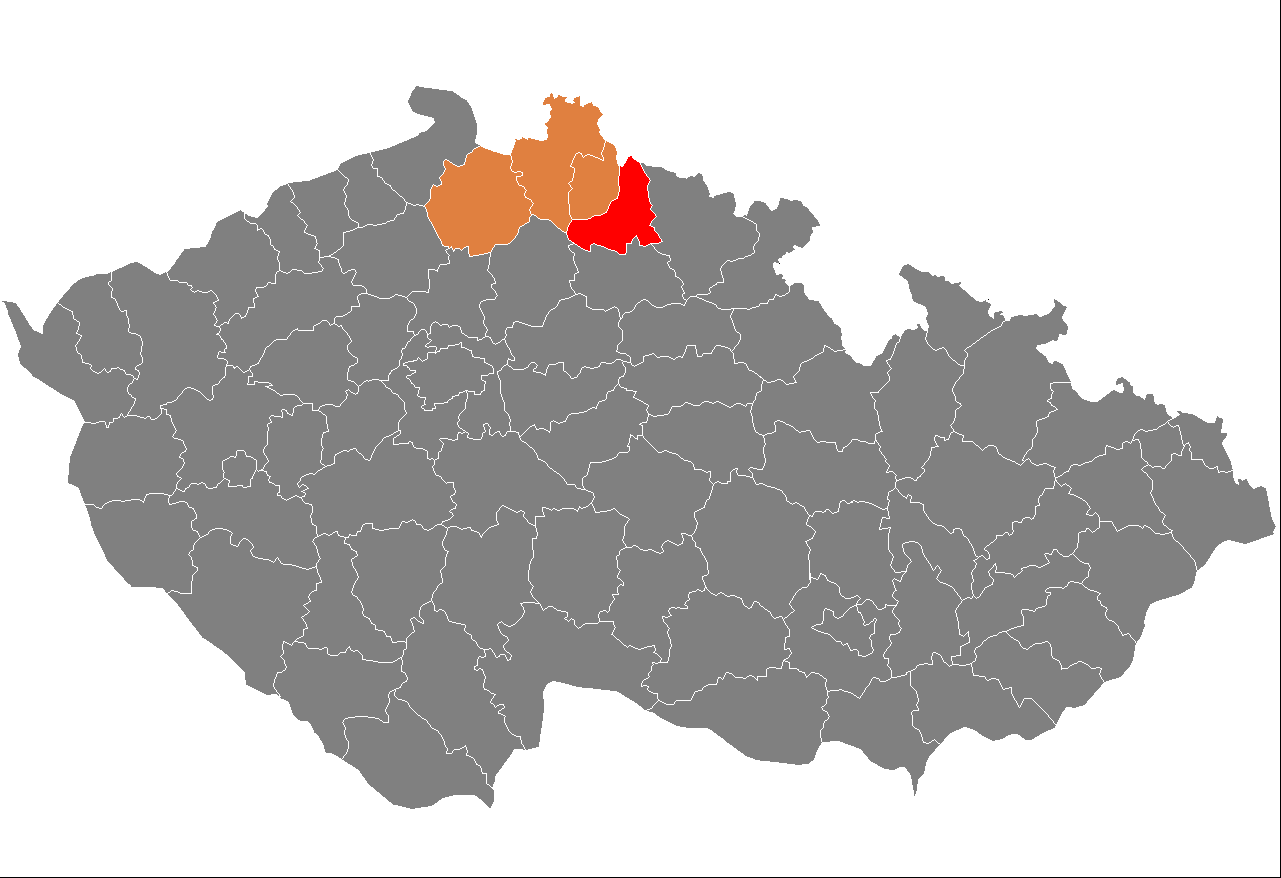
- Location in the Liberec Region within the Czech Republic
- Coordinates: 50°36′N 15°24′E
- Country: Czech Republic
- Region: Liberec
- Capital: Semily

Area
  - Total: 662.32 km^{2} (255.72 sq mi)

Population (2026)
  - Total: 72,478
  - Density: 109.43/km^{2} (283.42/sq mi)
- Time zone: UTC+1 (CET)
  - Summer (DST): UTC+2 (CEST)
- Municipalities: 64
- * Towns: 8
- * Market towns: 1

Semily District (Czech: okres Semily) is a district in the Liberec Region of the Czech Republic. Its capital is the town of Semily, but the most populous town is Turnov.

== Administrative division ==
Semily District is divided into three administrative districts of municipalities with extended competence: Semily, Jilemnice and Turnov. Turnov is the only such administrative district in the country, whose borders do not correspond to the borders of the district, and extends also to the neighbouring districts of Jablonec nad Nisou and Liberec.

=== List of municipalities ===
Towns are marked in bold and market towns in italics:

Bělá - Benecko - Benešov u Semil - Bozkov - Bradlecká Lhota - Bukovina u Čisté - Bystrá nad Jizerou - Chuchelna - Čistá u Horek - Háje nad Jizerou - Holenice - Horka u Staré Paky - Horní Branná - Hrubá Skála - Jablonec nad Jizerou - Jesenný - Jestřabí v Krkonoších - Jilemnice - Kacanovy - Karlovice - Klokočí - Košťálov - Kruh - Ktová - Levínská Olešnice - Libštát - Lomnice nad Popelkou - Loučky - Martinice v Krkonoších - Mírová pod Kozákovem - Modřišice - Mříčná - Nová Ves nad Popelkou - Ohrazenice - Olešnice - Paseky nad Jizerou - Peřimov - Poniklá - Přepeře - Příkrý - Radostná pod Kozákovem - Rakousy - Rokytnice nad Jizerou - Roprachtice - Rovensko pod Troskami - Roztoky u Jilemnice - Roztoky u Semil - Semily - Slaná - Stružinec - Studenec - Svojek - Syřenov - Tatobity - Troskovice - Turnov - Veselá - Víchová nad Jizerou - Vítkovice - Všeň - Vyskeř - Vysoké nad Jizerou - Záhoří - Žernov

== Geography ==
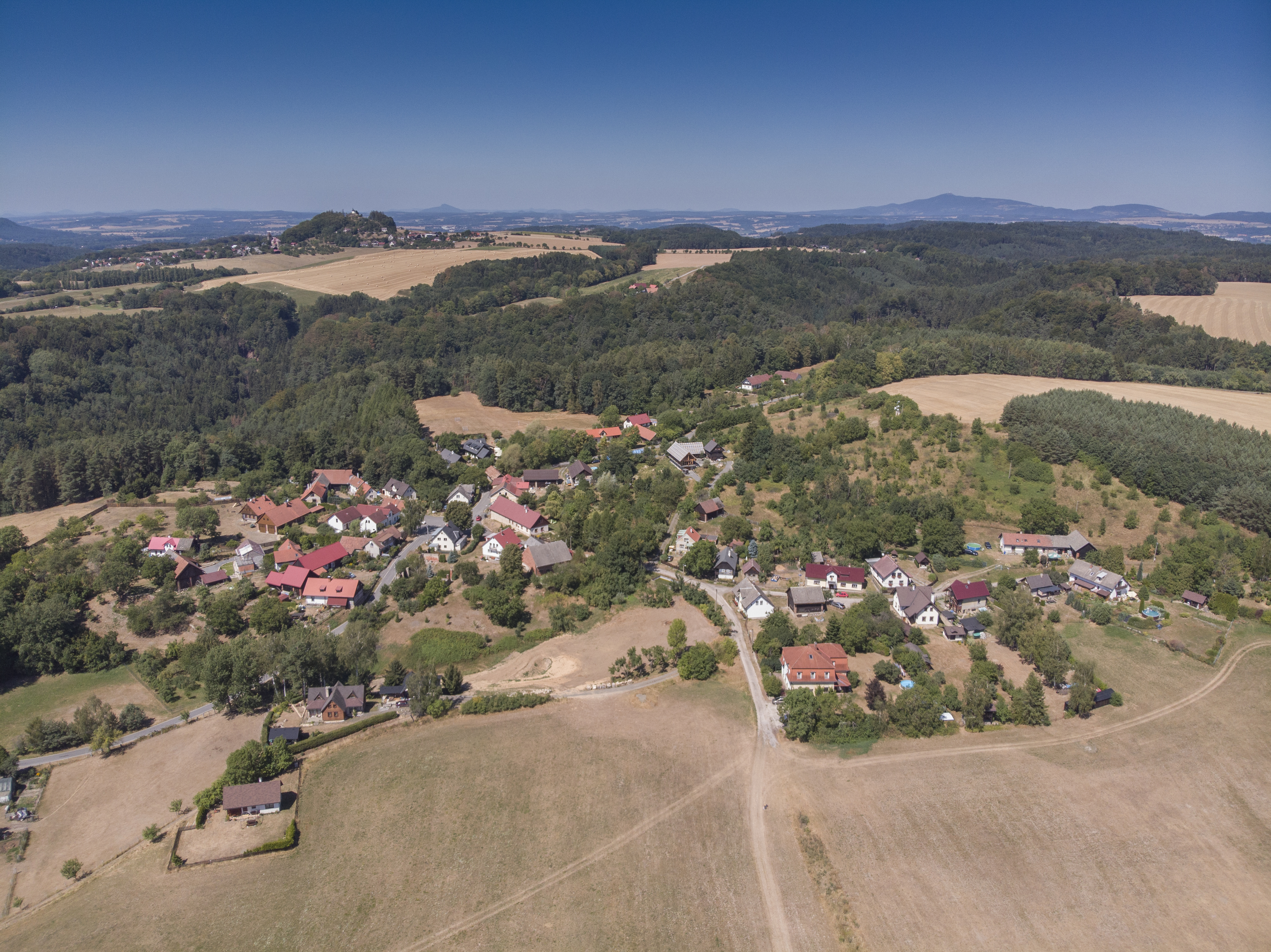
Krčkovice and surrounding landscape

Semily District briefly borders Poland in the north. The terrain is very diverse, mountainous in the north, foothills in the middle and slightly undulating in the south. The territory extends into five geomorphological mesoregions: Giant Mountains Foothills (most of the territory), Giant Mountains (north), Ještěd–Kozákov Ridge (a strip from west to south) and Jičín Uplands (southwest). The highest point of the district and of the entire Liberec Region is the mountain Kotel in Vítkovice with an elevation of 1,435 m (4,708 ft), the 10th highest mountain in the country. The lowest point is the river bed of the Jizera in Všeň at 236 m (774 ft).

From the total district area of 662.3 km^{2} (255.7 sq mi), agricultural land occupies 368.8 km^{2} (142.4 sq mi), forests occupy 229.0 km^{2} (88.4 sq mi), and water area occupies 6.6 km^{2} (2.5 sq mi). Forests cover 23.2% of the district's area.

The most important river is the Jizera, which crosses the territory from north to southwest. Its longest tributaries in the district are the Oleška and Jizerka. The Cidlina originates here, but soon after leaves the district. The area is poor in bodies of water.

Most of the Giant Mountains area of the district is protected as the Krkonoše National Park and belongs to the most valuable area of the country thanks to a significant amount of rare flora and fauna. In the west, two separate parts of the Bohemian Paradise Protected Landscape Area lie within the district. A small part of the Jizerské hory Protected Landscape Area also extends into the territory, although the Jizera Mountains range itself does not extend into the district.

== Demographics ==
Historical population

Year	Pop.	±%
1869	106,240	—
1880	106,920	+0.6%
1890	110,475	+3.3%
1900	109,887	−0.5%
1910	113,374	+3.2%

Year	Pop.	±%
1921	102,005	−10.0%
1930	103,848	+1.8%
1950	80,681	−22.3%
1961	78,072	−3.2%
1970	76,631	−1.8%

Year	Pop.	±%
1980	76,503	−0.2%
1991	75,547	−1.2%
2001	75,355	−0.3%
2011	73,605	−2.3%
2021	70,590	−4.1%

Source: Censuses

=== Most populous municipalities ===
Name	Population	Area (km^{2})
Turnov	14,607	23
Semily	7,999	16
Lomnice nad Popelkou	5,649	26
Jilemnice	5,312	14
Rokytnice nad Jizerou	2,459	37
Horní Branná	1,868	21
Studenec	1,843	17
Mírová pod Kozákovem	1,730	19
Košťálov	1,672	20
Jablonec nad Jizerou	1,592	22

== Economy ==
The largest employers with headquarters in Semily District and at least 500 employees are:

Economic entity	Location	Number of employees	Main activity
Devro	Jilemnice	1,000–1,499	Manufacture of plastic products
MMN	Jilemnice	500–999	Health care
Grupo Antolin Turnov	Turnov	500–999	Manufacture of plastic products
Kamax	Turnov	500–999	Treatment and coating of metals
Ontex CZ	Turnov	500–999	Manufacture of hygiene aids

== Transport ==
The D10 motorway from Prague, which further continues as the R/35 expressway to Liberec, runs along the western border of the district. The most important roads in the district are the I/10 road (part of the European route E65) from Turnov to the Czech–Polish border, the I/35 road (part of European route E442) to Hradec Králové, and the I/14 road from Liberec to Trutnov.

== Sights ==
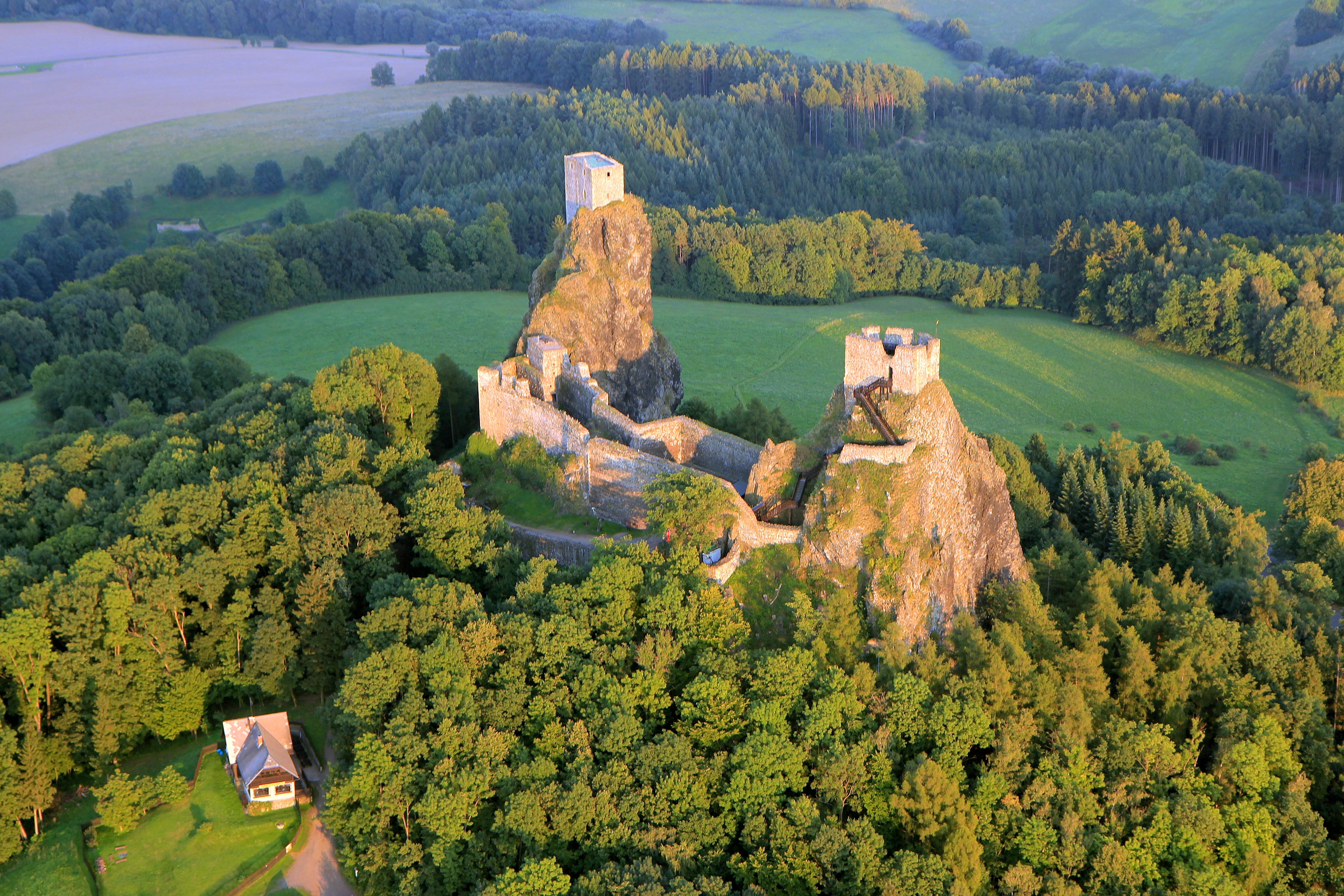
Trosky Castle

The most important monuments in the district, protected as national cultural monuments, are:

- Hrubý Rohozec Castle
- Trosky Castle
- Dlask's Farm in Dolánky u Turnova
- Janata's Mill in Buřany

The best-preserved settlements, protected as monument reservations and monument zones, are:

- Lomnice nad Popelkou-Karlov (monument reservation)
- Horní Štěpanice-Karlov (monument reservation)
- Jilemnice
- Lomnice nad Popelkou
- Turnov
- Újezdec

The most visited tourist destinations are the Trosky Castle and Valdštejn Castle.
