= Slaná (Semily District) =

- Municipality
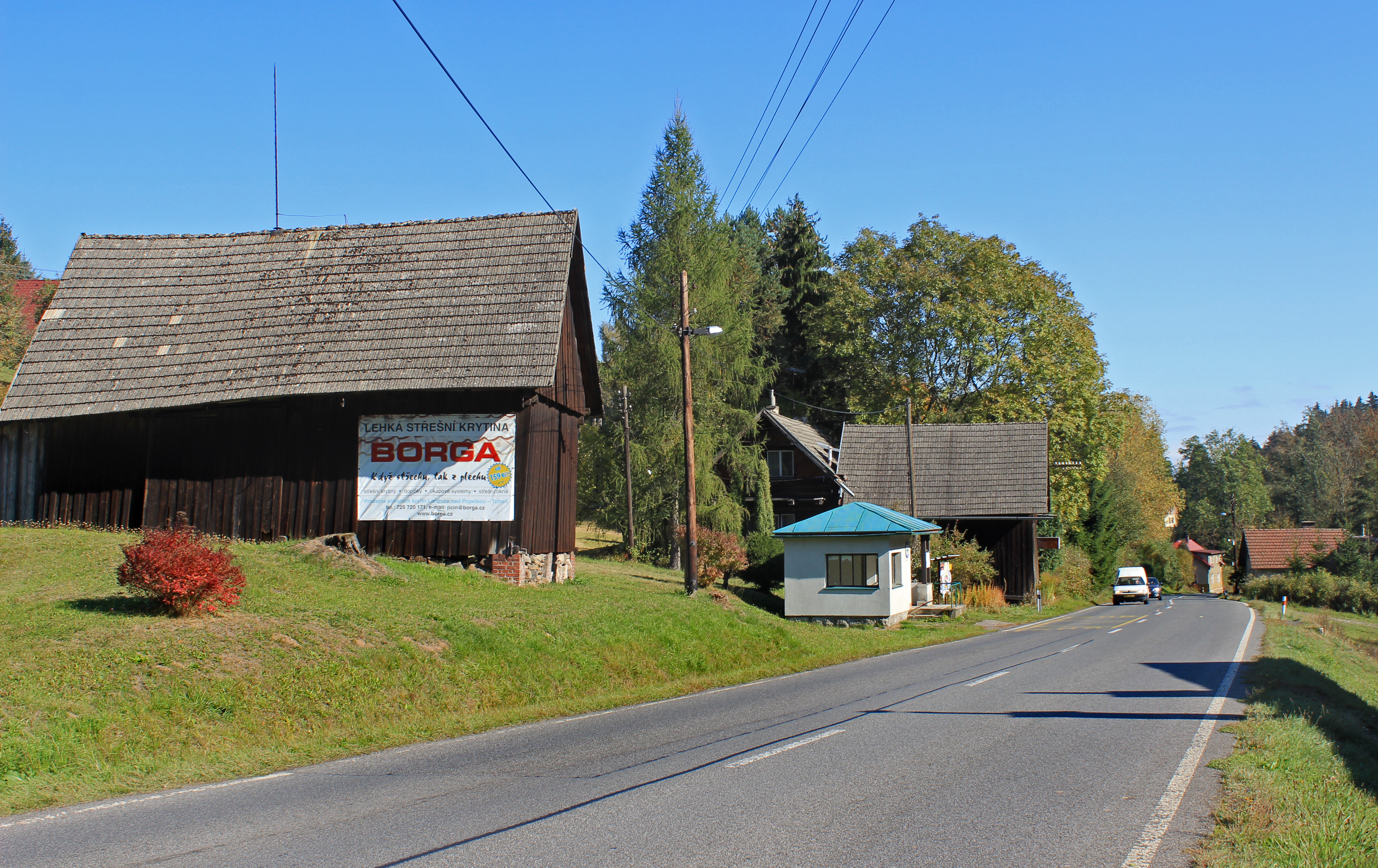
- Hořensko, a part of Slaná

- Flag Coat of arms

- Location in the Czech Republic
- Coordinates: 50°34′51″N 15°19′47″E
- Country: Czech Republic
- Region: Liberec
- District: Semily
- First mentioned: 1430

Area
  - Total: 10.26 km^{2} (3.96 sq mi)
- Elevation: 358 m (1,175 ft)

Population (2026-01-01)
  - Total: 677
  - Density: 66.0/km^{2} (171/sq mi)
- Time zone: UTC+1 (CET)
  - Summer (DST): UTC+2 (CEST)
- Postal code: 512 01
- Website: www.obecslana.cz

Slaná is a municipality and village in Semily District in the Liberec Region of the Czech Republic. It has about 700 inhabitants.

== Administrative division ==
Slaná consists of six municipal parts (in brackets population according to the 2021 census):

- Slaná (208)
- Bořkov (198)
- Hořensko (70)
- Nedvězí (185)
- Sutice (5)
- Světlá (24)

== History ==
The first written mention of Slaná is from 1430.

== Demographics ==
Historical population
Year	Pop.	±%
1869	1,267	—
1880	1,391	+9.8%
1890	1,418	+1.9%
1900	1,389	−2.0%
1910	1,567	+12.8%
1921	1,372	−12.4%
1930	1,330	−3.1%
1950	999	−24.9%
1961	928	−7.1%
1970	816	−12.1%
1980	749	−8.2%
1991	626	−16.4%
2001	632	+1.0%
2011	667	+5.5%
2021	690	+3.4%
Source: Censuses
