= Víchová nad Jizerou =

- Municipality
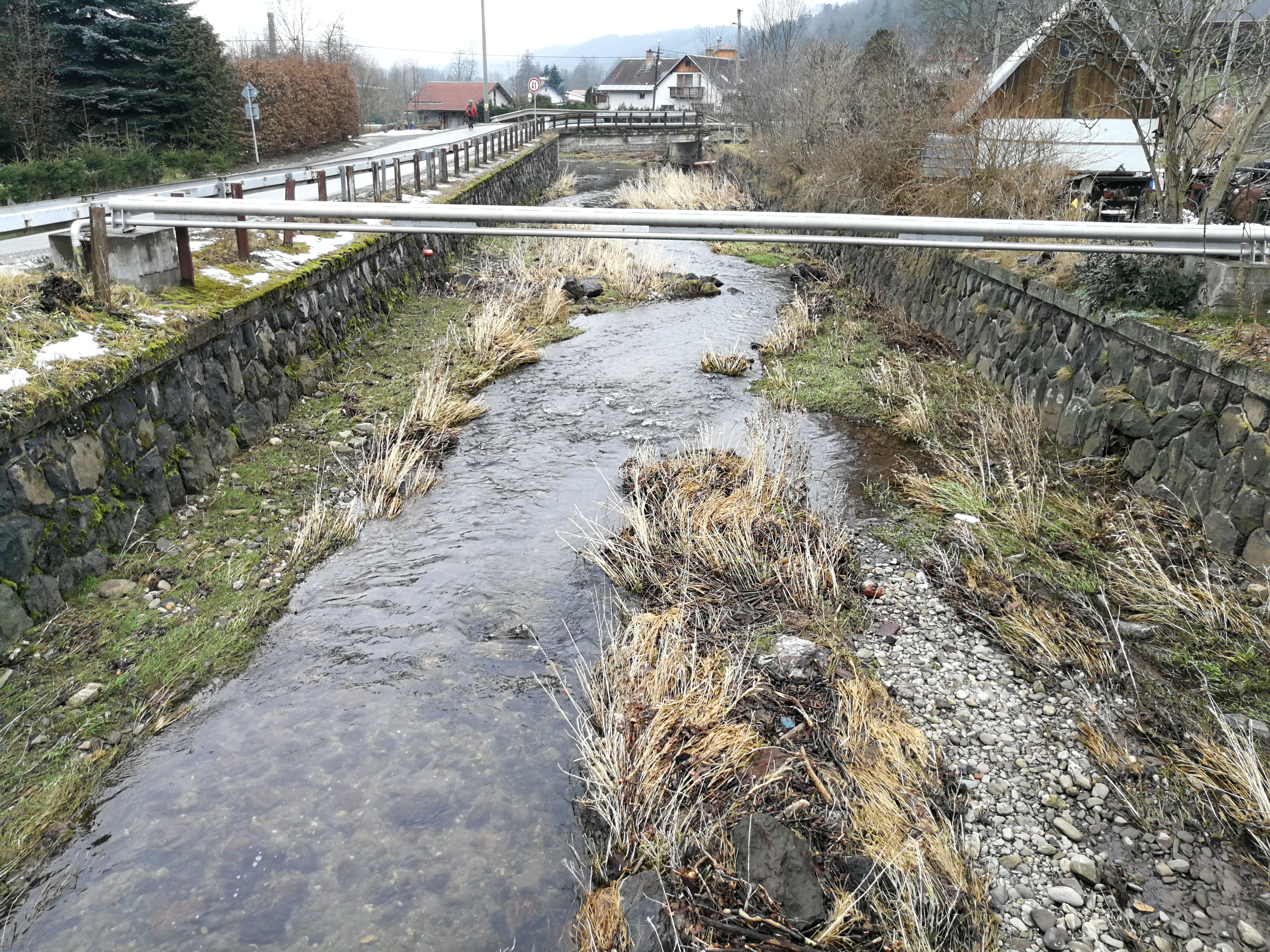
- Jizera River in Víchová nad Jizerou

- Flag Coat of arms

- Location in the Czech Republic
- Coordinates: 50°37′48″N 15°29′16″E
- Country: Czech Republic
- Region: Liberec
- District: Semily
- First mentioned: 1492

Area
  - Total: 12.30 km^{2} (4.75 sq mi)
- Elevation: 411 m (1,348 ft)

Population (2026-01-01)
  - Total: 837
  - Density: 68.0/km^{2} (176/sq mi)
- Time zone: UTC+1 (CET)
  - Summer (DST): UTC+2 (CEST)
- Postal codes: 512 41, 514 01
- Website: www.vichovanj.cz

Víchová nad Jizerou is a municipality and village in Semily District in the Liberec Region of the Czech Republic. It has about 800 inhabitants. It lies on the Jizera River.

== Administrative division ==
Víchová nad Jizerou consists of three municipal parts (in brackets population according to the 2021 census):

- Víchová nad Jizerou (578)
- Horní Sytová (214)
- Víchovská Lhota (74)

== History ==
The first written mention of Víchová nad Jizerou is from 1492.

== Demographics ==
Historical population
Year	Pop.	±%
1869	1,929	—
1880	1,825	−5.4%
1890	1,876	+2.8%
1900	1,776	−5.3%
1910	1,934	+8.9%
1921	1,692	−12.5%
1930	1,688	−0.2%
1950	1,106	−34.5%
1961	1,047	−5.3%
1970	918	−12.3%
1980	872	−5.0%
1991	868	−0.5%
2001	935	+7.7%
2011	912	−2.5%
2021	866	−5.0%
Source: Censuses
