= Holenice =

- Municipality
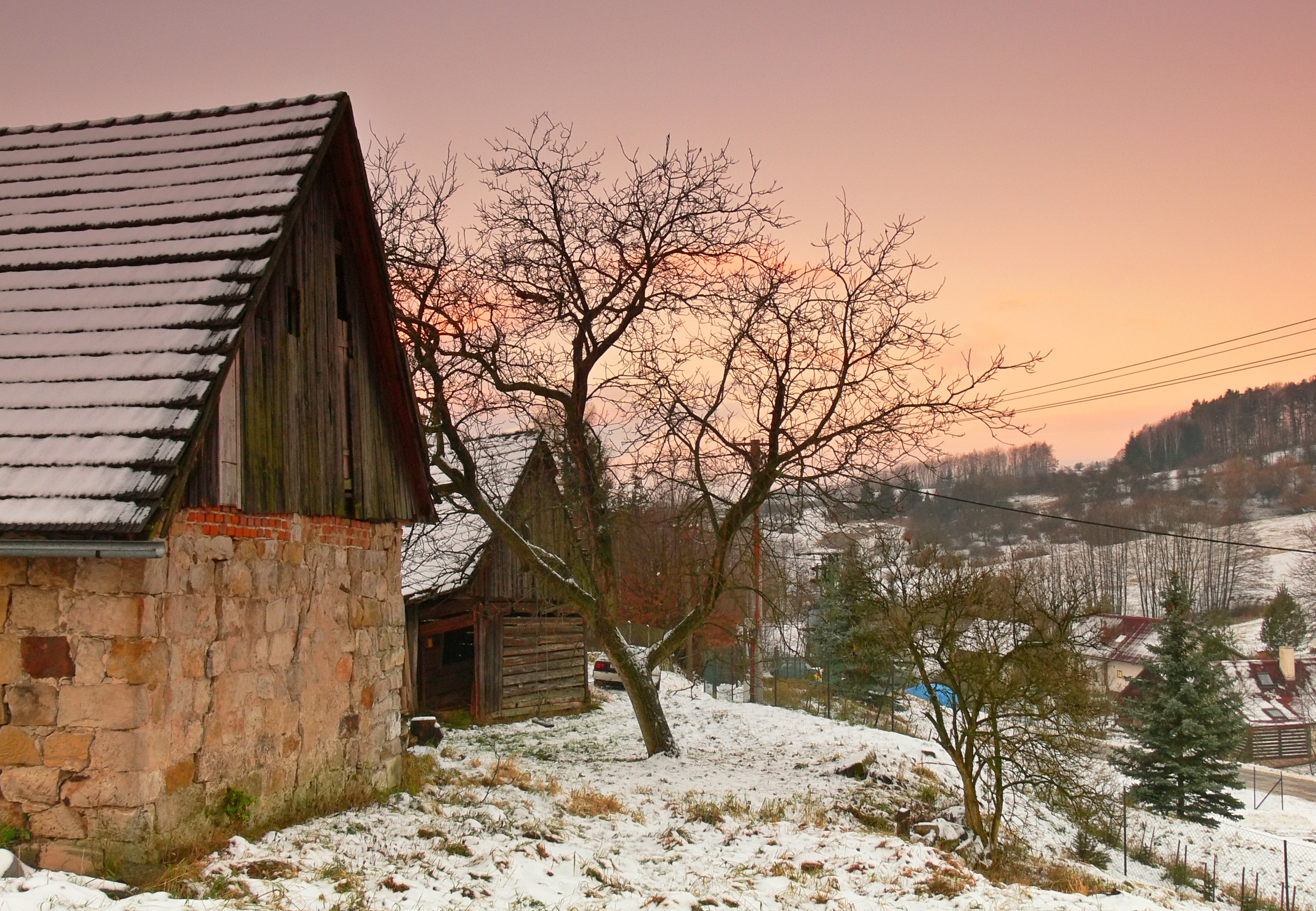
- Houses in Holenice

- Location in the Czech Republic
- Coordinates: 50°31′14″N 15°18′2″E
- Country: Czech Republic
- Region: Liberec
- District: Semily
- First mentioned: 1398

Area
  - Total: 3.50 km^{2} (1.35 sq mi)
- Elevation: 368 m (1,207 ft)

Population (2026-01-01)
  - Total: 100
  - Density: 29/km^{2} (74/sq mi)
- Time zone: UTC+1 (CET)
  - Summer (DST): UTC+2 (CEST)
- Postal code: 506 01
- Website: www.holenice.cz

Holenice is a municipality and village in Semily District in the Liberec Region of the Czech Republic. It has about 100 inhabitants.

== Demographics ==
Historical population
Year	Pop.	±%
1869	373	—
1880	382	+2.4%
1890	407	+6.5%
1900	407	+0.0%
1910	371	−8.8%
1921	308	−17.0%
1930	306	−0.6%
1950	207	−32.4%
1961	187	−9.7%
1970	175	−6.4%
1980	134	−23.4%
1991	102	−23.9%
2001	83	−18.6%
2011	93	+12.0%
2021	96	+3.2%
Source: Censuses
