= Mříčná =

- Municipality
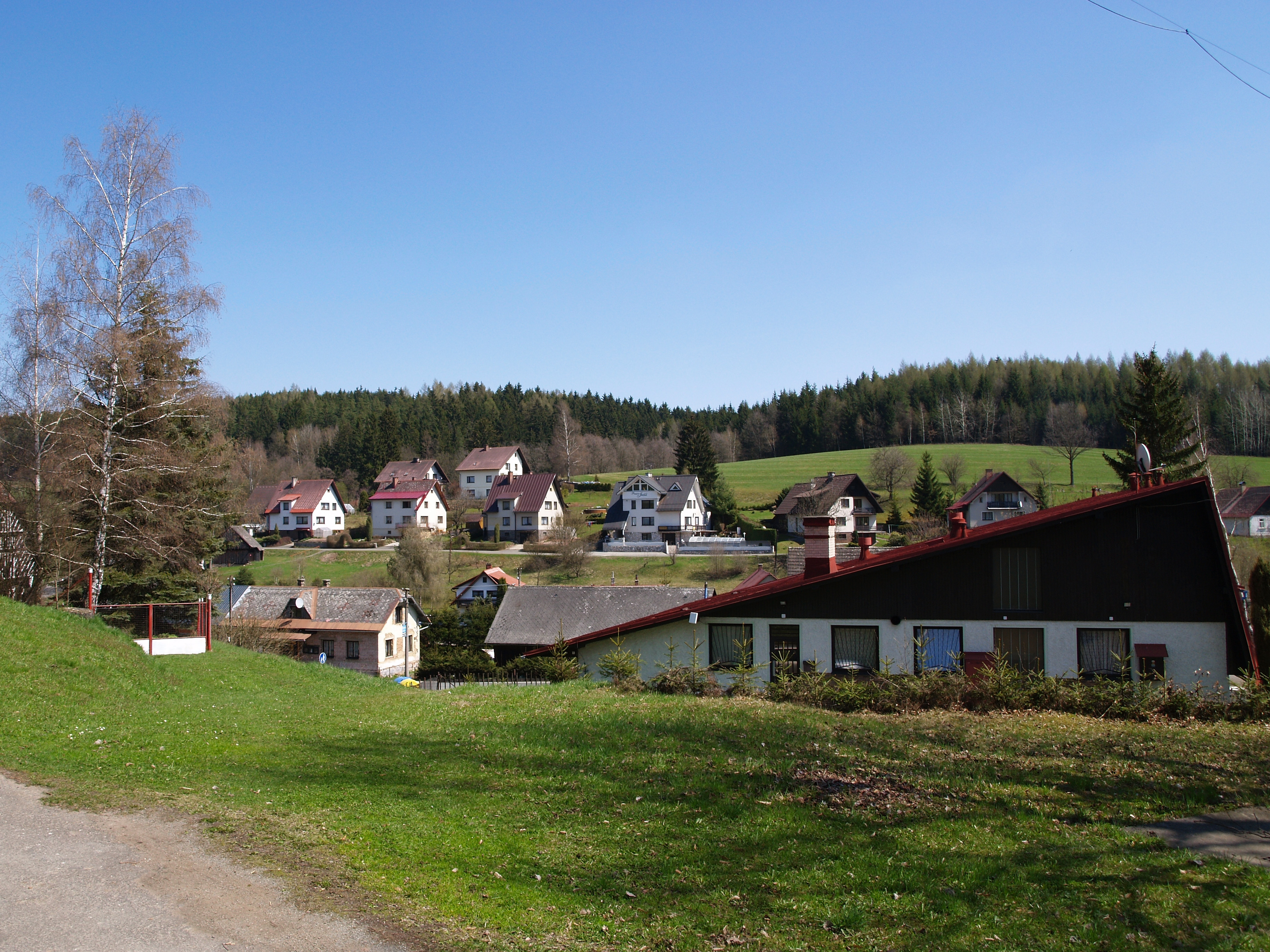
- General view

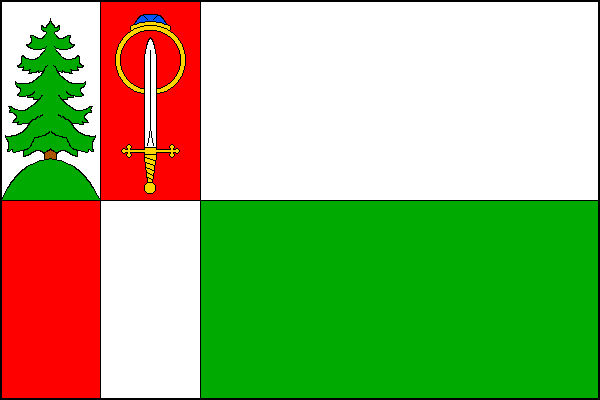
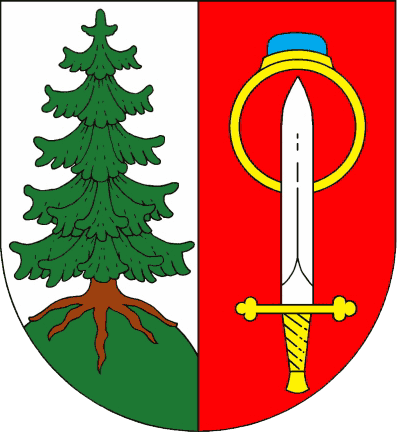
- Flag Coat of arms

- Location in the Czech Republic
- Coordinates: 50°36′3″N 15°28′8″E
- Country: Czech Republic
- Region: Liberec
- District: Semily
- First mentioned: 1356

Area
  - Total: 10.05 km^{2} (3.88 sq mi)
- Elevation: 431 m (1,414 ft)

Population (2026-01-01)
  - Total: 593
  - Density: 59.0/km^{2} (153/sq mi)
- Time zone: UTC+1 (CET)
  - Summer (DST): UTC+2 (CEST)
- Postal code: 512 04
- Website: www.mricna.cz

Mříčná is a municipality and village in Semily District in the Liberec Region of the Czech Republic. It has about 600 inhabitants.

== Demographics ==
Historical population
Year	Pop.	±%
1869	1,413	—
1880	1,433	+1.4%
1890	1,480	+3.3%
1900	1,401	−5.3%
1910	1,392	−0.6%
1921	1,146	−17.7%
1930	1,048	−8.6%
1950	588	−43.9%
1961	591	+0.5%
1970	495	−16.2%
1980	486	−1.8%
1991	448	−7.8%
2001	474	+5.8%
2011	505	+6.5%
2021	588	+16.4%
Source: Censuses
