= Roztoky u Jilemnice =

- Municipality
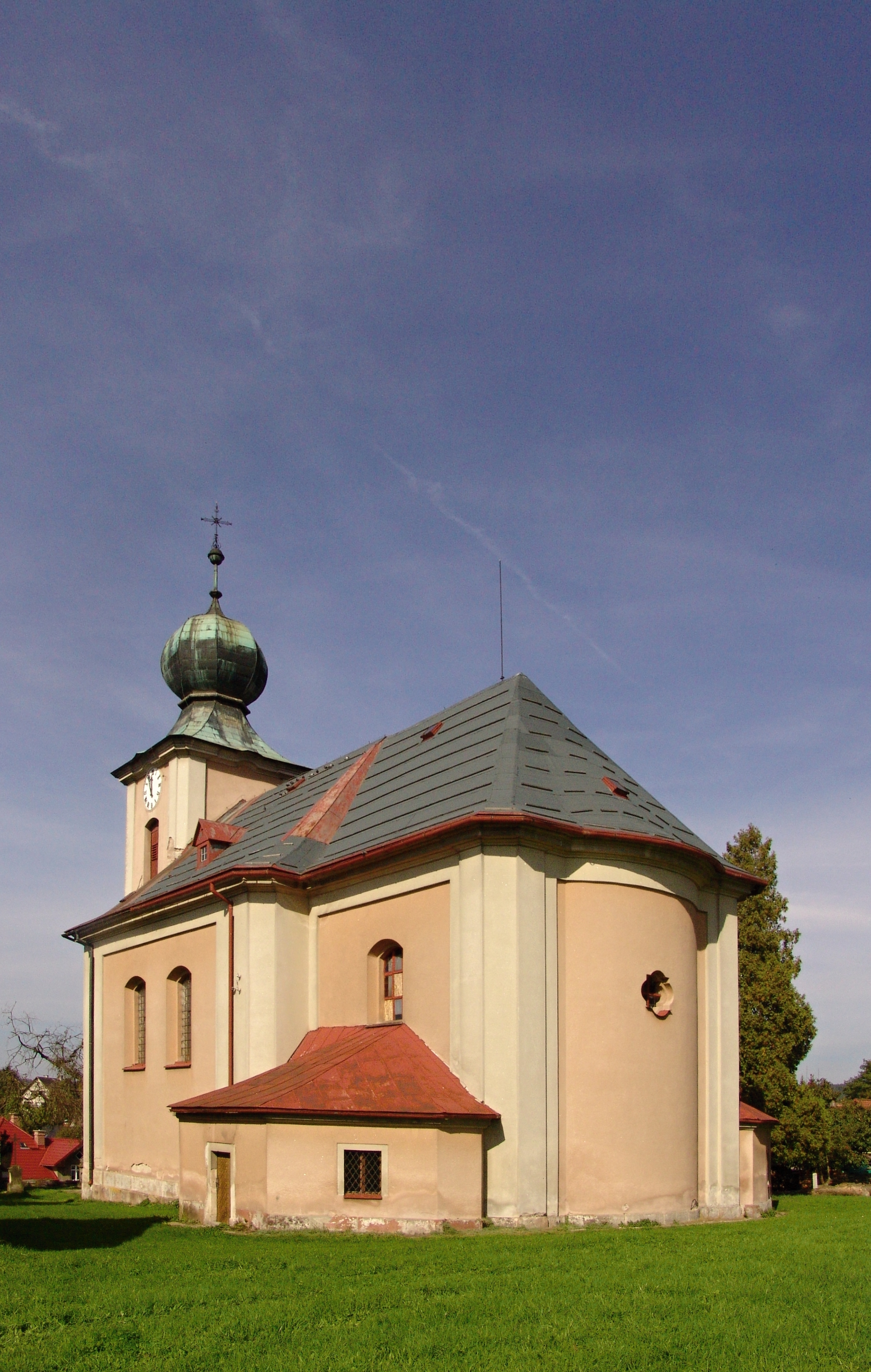
- Church of Saints Philip and James

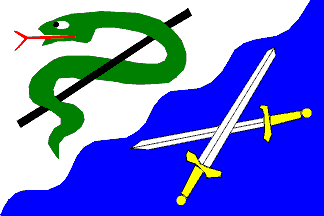
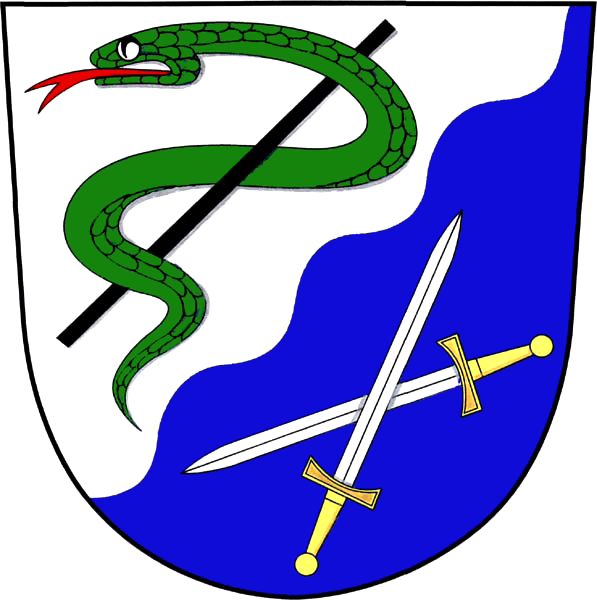
- Flag Coat of arms

- Location in the Czech Republic
- Coordinates: 50°33′50″N 15°29′59″E
- Country: Czech Republic
- Region: Liberec
- District: Semily
- First mentioned: 1360

Area
  - Total: 13.04 km^{2} (5.03 sq mi)
- Elevation: 428 m (1,404 ft)

Population (2026-01-01)
  - Total: 1,083
  - Density: 83.05/km^{2} (215.1/sq mi)
- Time zone: UTC+1 (CET)
  - Summer (DST): UTC+2 (CEST)
- Postal code: 512 31
- Website: www.roztoky-u-jilemnice.cz

Roztoky u Jilemnice is a municipality and village in Semily District in the Liberec Region of the Czech Republic. It has about 1,100 inhabitants.

== Demographics ==
Historical population
Year	Pop.	±%
1869	1,407	—
1880	1,423	+1.1%
1890	1,469	+3.2%
1900	1,552	+5.7%
1910	1,580	+1.8%
1921	1,372	−13.2%
1930	1,311	−4.4%
1950	1,032	−21.3%
1961	1,196	+15.9%
1970	1,163	−2.8%
1980	1,014	−12.8%
1991	933	−8.0%
2001	922	−1.2%
2011	977	+6.0%
2021	1,055	+8.0%
Source: Censuses
