= Ohrazenice (Semily District) =

- Municipality
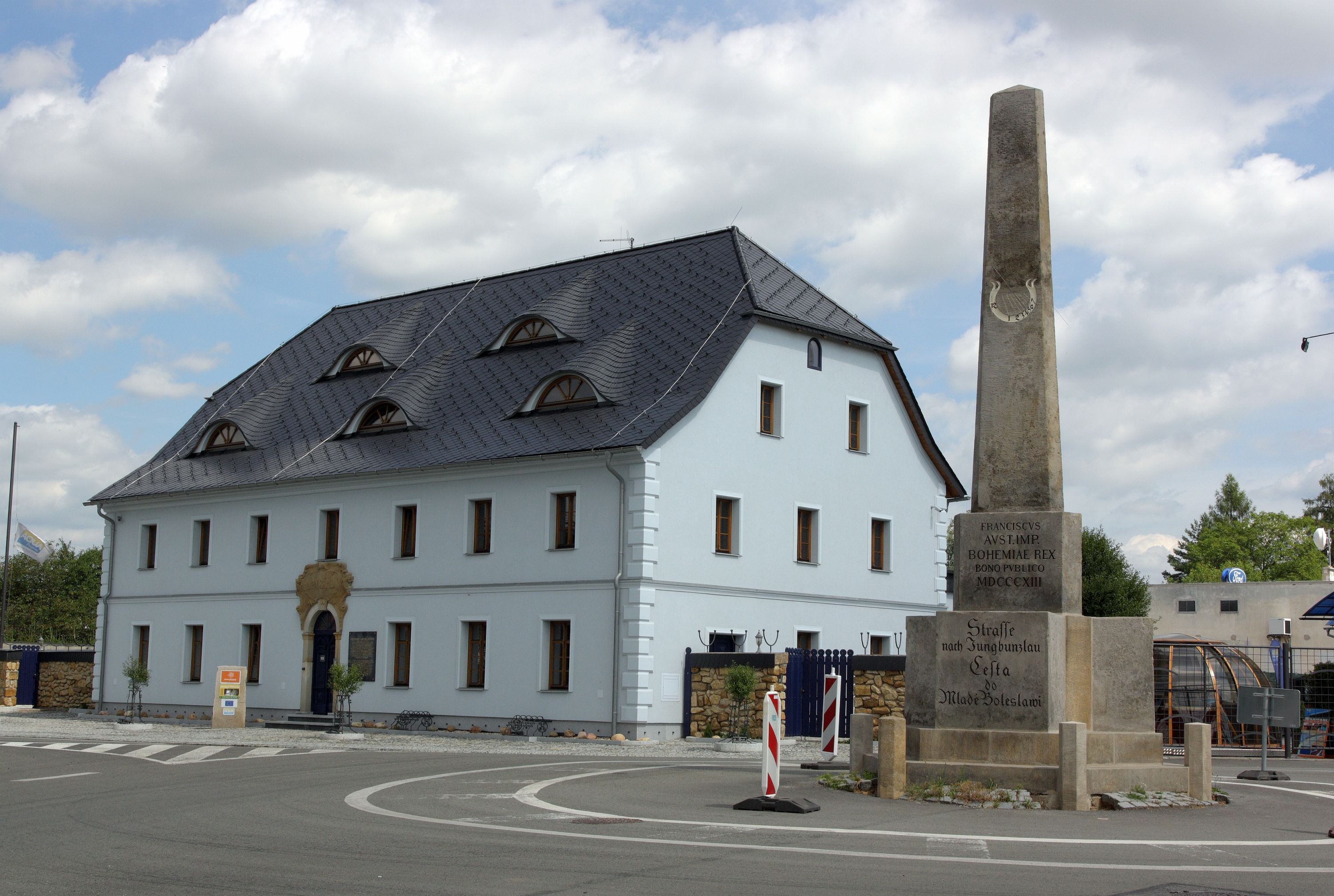
- Stone guidepost and former inn

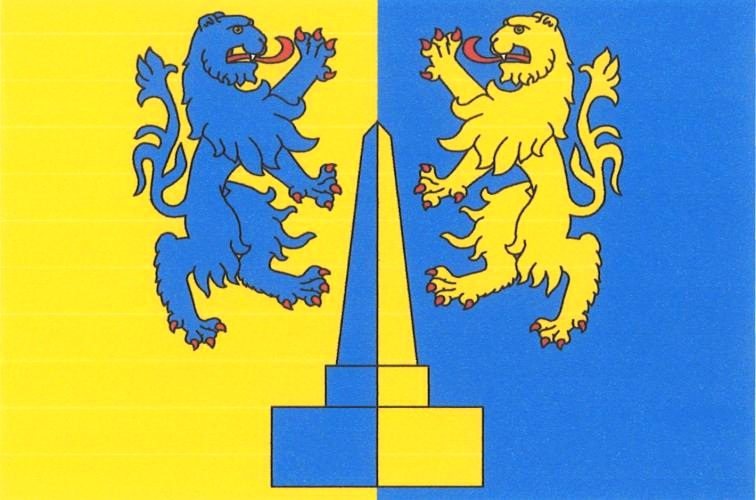
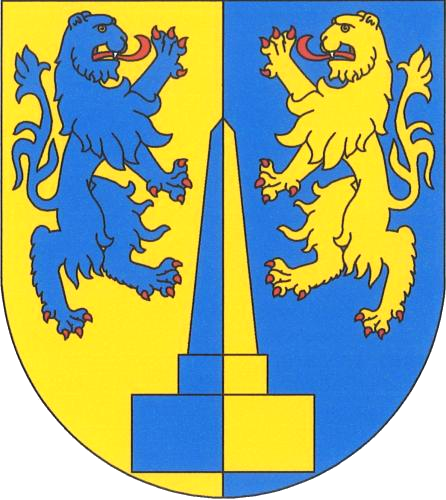
- Flag Coat of arms

- Location in the Czech Republic
- Coordinates: 50°35′52″N 15°7′34″E
- Country: Czech Republic
- Region: Liberec
- District: Semily
- First mentioned: 1543

Area
  - Total: 2.69 km^{2} (1.04 sq mi)
- Elevation: 256 m (840 ft)

Population (2026-01-01)
  - Total: 1,105
  - Density: 411/km^{2} (1,060/sq mi)
- Time zone: UTC+1 (CET)
  - Summer (DST): UTC+2 (CEST)
- Postal code: 511 01
- Website: ohrazenice.cz

Ohrazenice is a municipality and village in Semily District in the Liberec Region of the Czech Republic. It has about 1,100 inhabitants.

== Demographics ==
Historical population
Year	Pop.	±%
1869	543	—
1880	510	−6.1%
1890	576	+12.9%
1900	607	+5.4%
1910	728	+19.9%
1921	729	+0.1%
1930	722	−1.0%
1950	672	−6.9%
1961	677	+0.7%
1970	695	+2.7%
1980	688	−1.0%
1991	984	+43.0%
2001	1,036	+5.3%
2011	1,094	+5.6%
2021	1,088	−0.5%
Source: Censuses
