= Kacanovy =

- Municipality
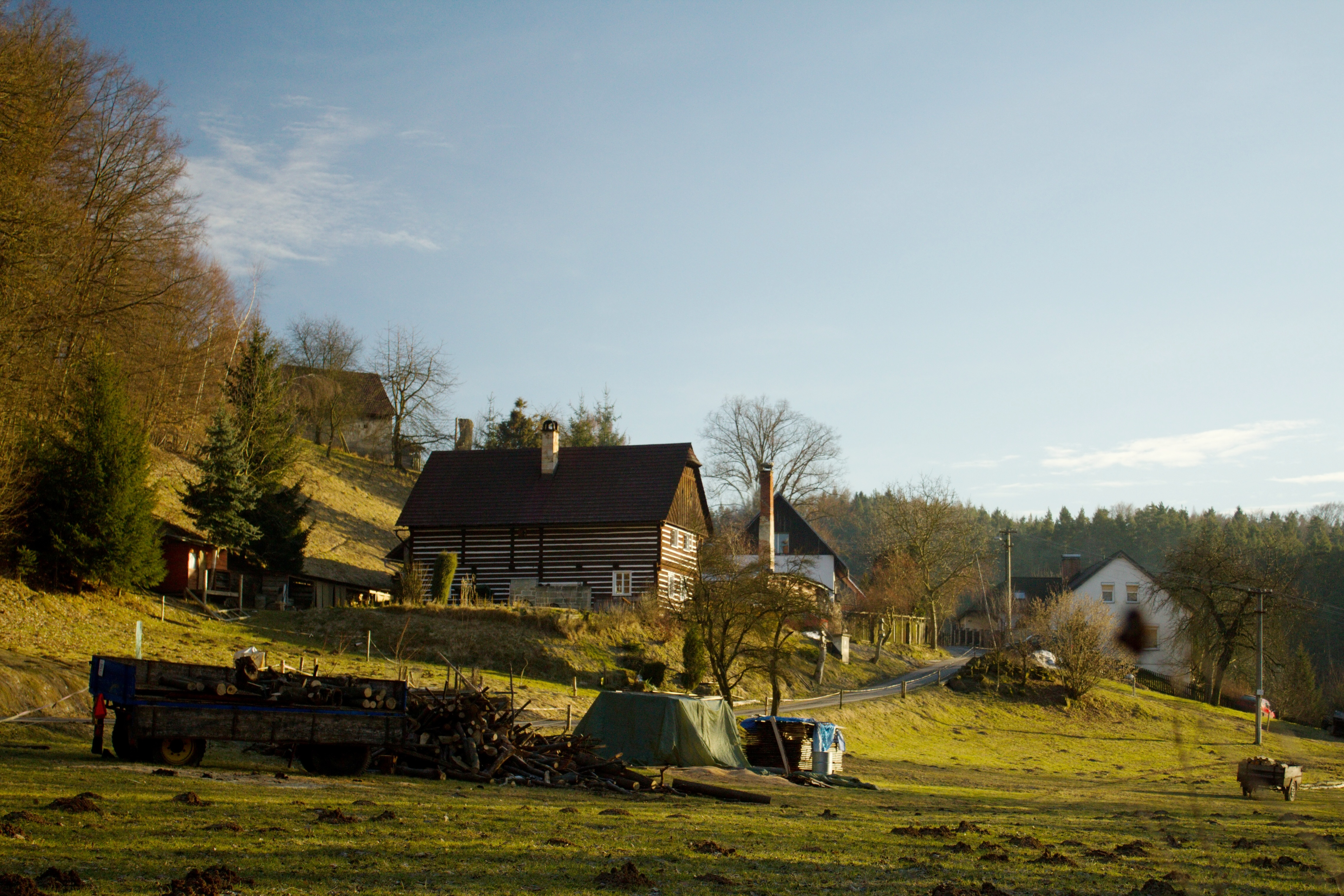
- View from the village

- Flag Coat of arms

- Location in the Czech Republic
- Coordinates: 50°33′3″N 15°8′43″E
- Country: Czech Republic
- Region: Liberec
- District: Semily
- First mentioned: 1615

Area
  - Total: 6.00 km^{2} (2.32 sq mi)
- Elevation: 296 m (971 ft)

Population (2026-01-01)
  - Total: 234
  - Density: 39.0/km^{2} (101/sq mi)
- Time zone: UTC+1 (CET)
  - Summer (DST): UTC+2 (CEST)
- Postal code: 511 01
- Website: www.kacanovy.craj.cz

Kacanovy is a municipality and village in Semily District in the Liberec Region of the Czech Republic. It has about 200 inhabitants.

== Demographics ==
Historical population
Year	Pop.	±%
1869	362	—
1880	363	+0.3%
1890	417	+14.9%
1900	375	−10.1%
1910	388	+3.5%
1921	383	−1.3%
1930	359	−6.3%
1950	266	−25.9%
1961	256	−3.8%
1970	203	−20.7%
1980	179	−11.8%
1991	180	+0.6%
2001	159	−11.7%
2011	179	+12.6%
2021	208	+16.2%
Source: Censuses
