= Vyskeř =

- Municipality
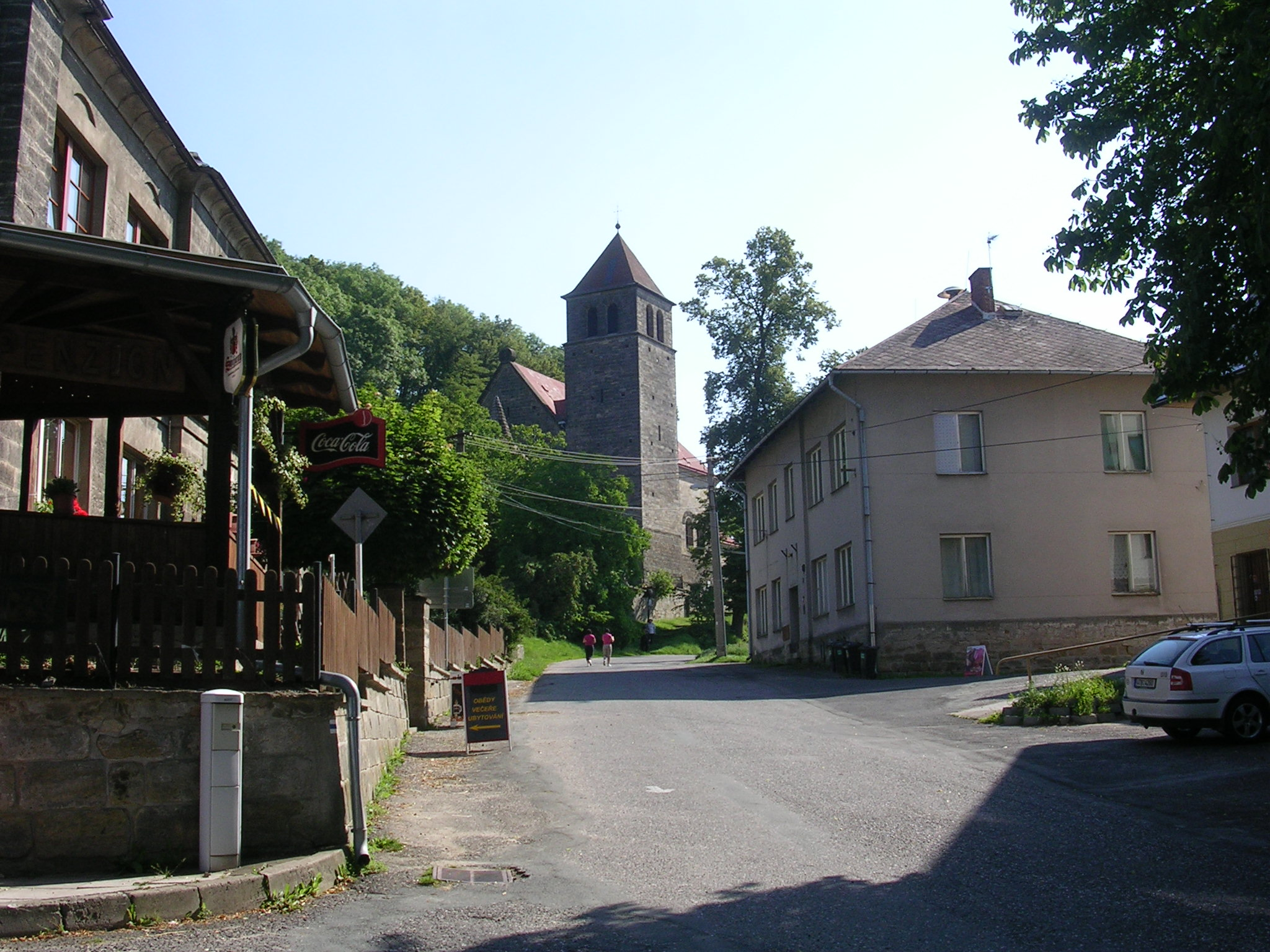
- Church of the Assumption of the Virgin Mary

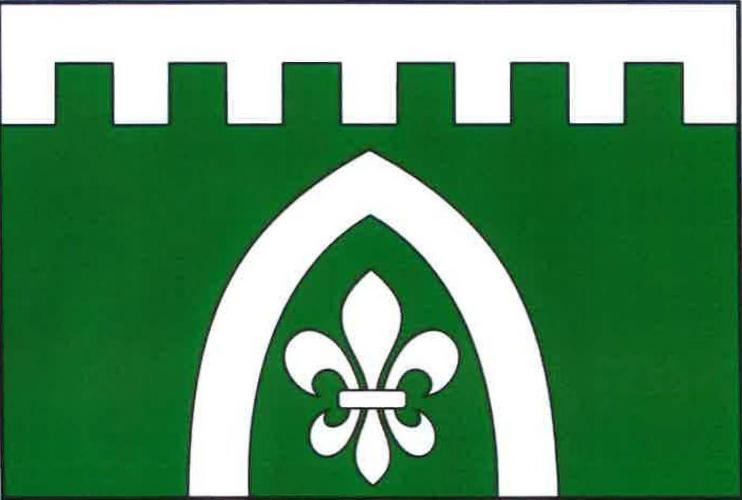
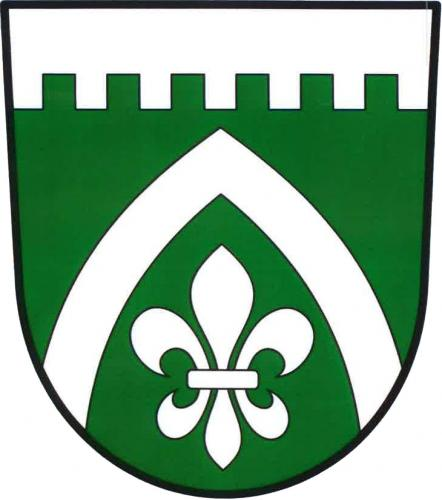
- Flag Coat of arms

- Location in the Czech Republic
- Coordinates: 50°31′46″N 15°9′29″E
- Country: Czech Republic
- Region: Liberec
- District: Semily
- First mentioned: 1318

Area
  - Total: 9.61 km^{2} (3.71 sq mi)
- Elevation: 372 m (1,220 ft)

Population (2026-01-01)
  - Total: 406
  - Density: 42.2/km^{2} (109/sq mi)
- Time zone: UTC+1 (CET)
  - Summer (DST): UTC+2 (CEST)
- Postal codes: 511 01, 512 64
- Website: www.vysker.cz

Vyskeř is a municipality and village in Semily District in the Liberec Region of the Czech Republic. It has about 400 inhabitants.

== Administrative division ==
Vyskeř consists of six municipal parts (in brackets population according to the 2021 census):

- Vyskeř (307)
- Drahoňovice (14)
- Lažany (18)
- Mladostov (2)
- Poddoubí (3)
- Skalany (72)

== Demographics ==
Historical population
Year	Pop.	±%
1869	1,041	—
1880	963	−7.5%
1890	1,048	+8.8%
1900	1,062	+1.3%
1910	1,030	−3.0%
1921	978	−5.0%
1930	863	−11.8%
1950	593	−31.3%
1961	540	−8.9%
1970	443	−18.0%
1980	394	−11.1%
1991	341	−13.5%
2001	375	+10.0%
2011	394	+5.1%
2021	416	+5.6%
Source: Censuses
