= Modřišice =

- Municipality
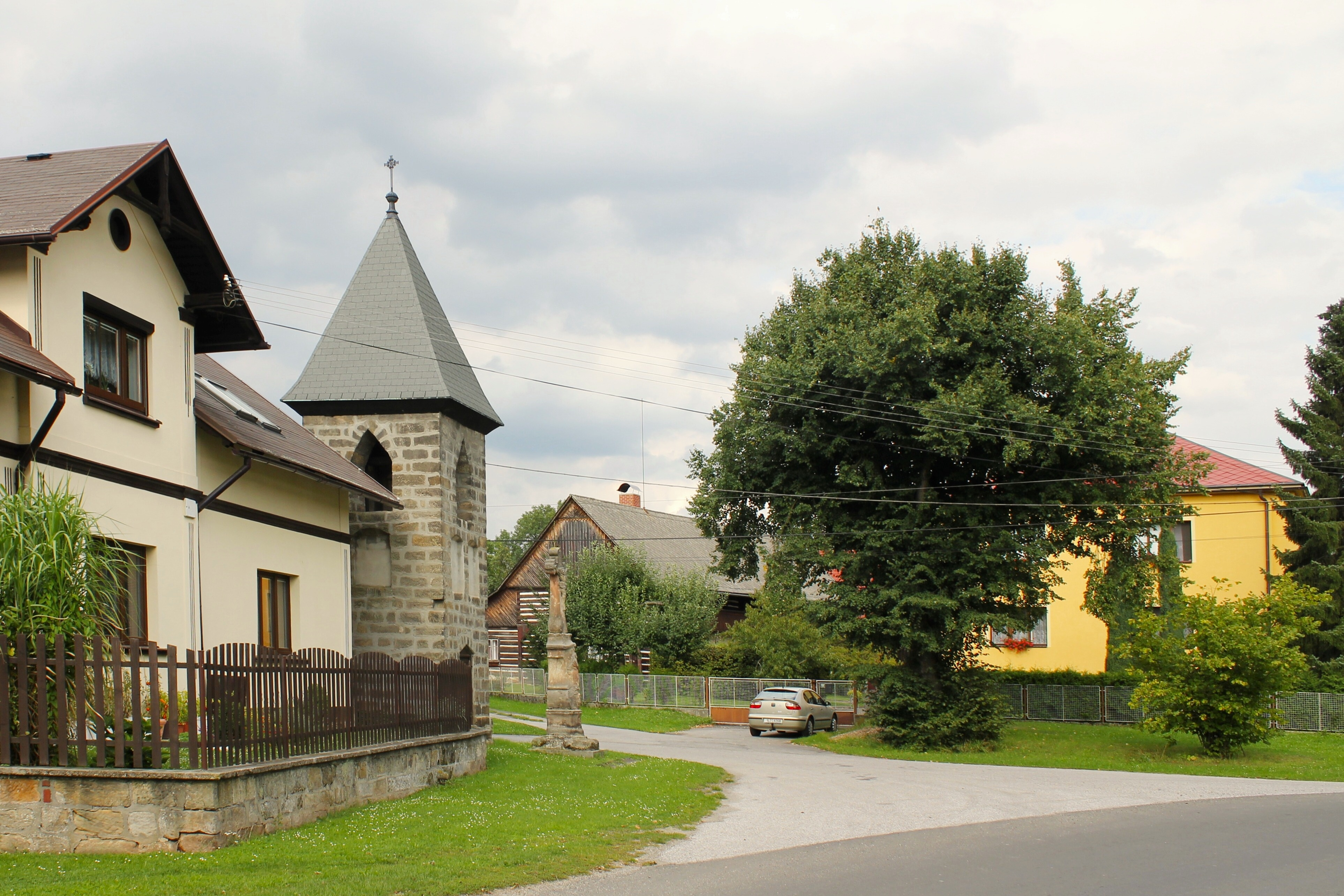
- Centre of Modřišice

- Flag Coat of arms

- Location in the Czech Republic
- Coordinates: 50°34′27″N 15°7′10″E
- Country: Czech Republic
- Region: Liberec
- District: Semily
- First mentioned: 1410

Area
  - Total: 3.46 km^{2} (1.34 sq mi)
- Elevation: 243 m (797 ft)

Population (2026-01-01)
  - Total: 427
  - Density: 123/km^{2} (320/sq mi)
- Time zone: UTC+1 (CET)
  - Summer (DST): UTC+2 (CEST)
- Postal code: 511 01
- Website: www.modrisice.cz

Modřišice is a municipality and village in Semily District in the Liberec Region of the Czech Republic. It has about 400 inhabitants.

== Demographics ==
Historical population
| Year | Pop. | ±% |
|---|---|---|
| 1869 | 459 | — |
| 1880 | 467 | +1.7% |
| 1890 | 491 | +5.1% |
| 1900 | 439 | −10.6% |
| 1910 | 479 | +9.1% |
| 1921 | 523 | +9.2% |
| 1930 | 514 | −1.7% |
| 1950 | 385 | −25.1% |
| 1961 | 436 | +13.2% |
| 1970 | 396 | −9.2% |
| 1980 | 359 | −9.3% |
| 1991 | 324 | −9.7% |
| 2001 | 357 | +10.2% |
| 2011 | 402 | +12.6% |
| 2021 | 448 | +11.4% |
Source: Censuses
