= Kruh =

- Municipality
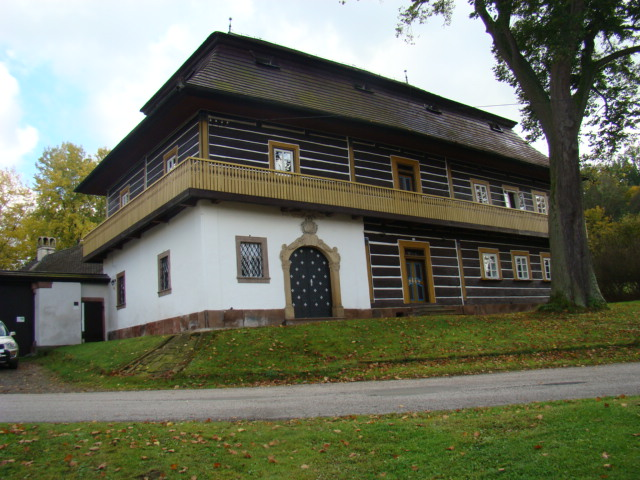
- Tuláček's farmhouse

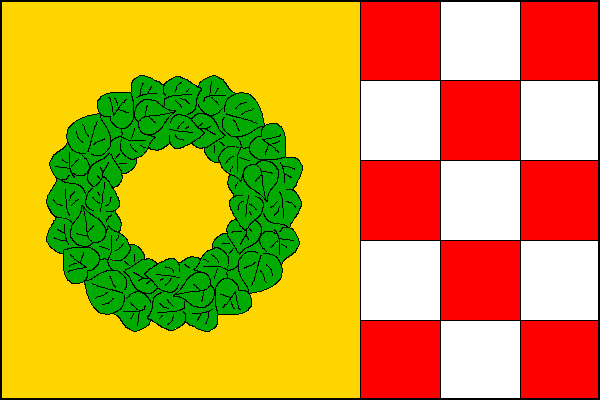
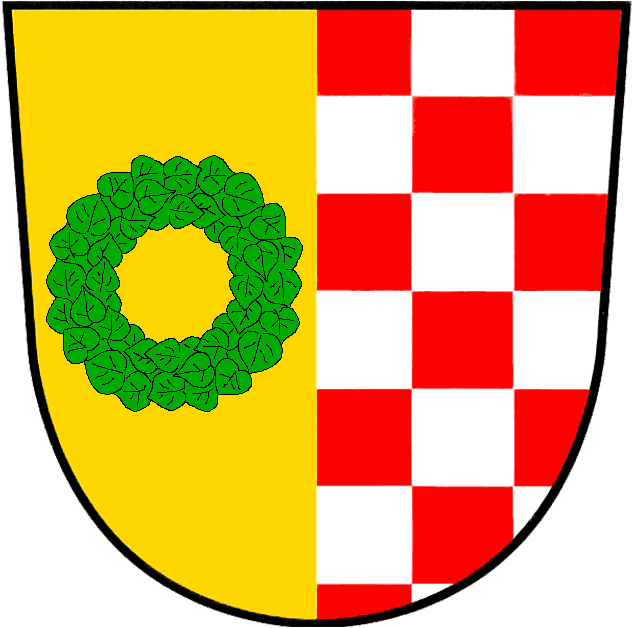
- Flag Coat of arms

- Location in the Czech Republic
- Coordinates: 50°33′56″N 15°28′49″E
- Country: Czech Republic
- Region: Liberec
- District: Semily
- First mentioned: 1386

Area
  - Total: 6.04 km^{2} (2.33 sq mi)
- Elevation: 426 m (1,398 ft)

Population (2026-01-01)
  - Total: 513
  - Density: 84.9/km^{2} (220/sq mi)
- Time zone: UTC+1 (CET)
  - Summer (DST): UTC+2 (CEST)
- Postal code: 514 01
- Website: www.obeckruh.cz

Kruh is a municipality and village in Semily District in the Liberec Region of the Czech Republic. It has about 500 inhabitants.

== Demographics ==
Historical population
Year	Pop.	±%
1869	1,174	—
1880	1,247	+6.2%
1890	1,241	−0.5%
1900	1,204	−3.0%
1910	1,236	+2.7%
1921	1,076	−12.9%
1930	1,016	−5.6%
1950	763	−24.9%
1961	591	−22.5%
1970	539	−8.8%
1980	550	+2.0%
1991	520	−5.5%
2001	499	−4.0%
2011	485	−2.8%
2021	462	−4.7%
Source: Censuses
