= Horka u Staré Paky =

- Municipality
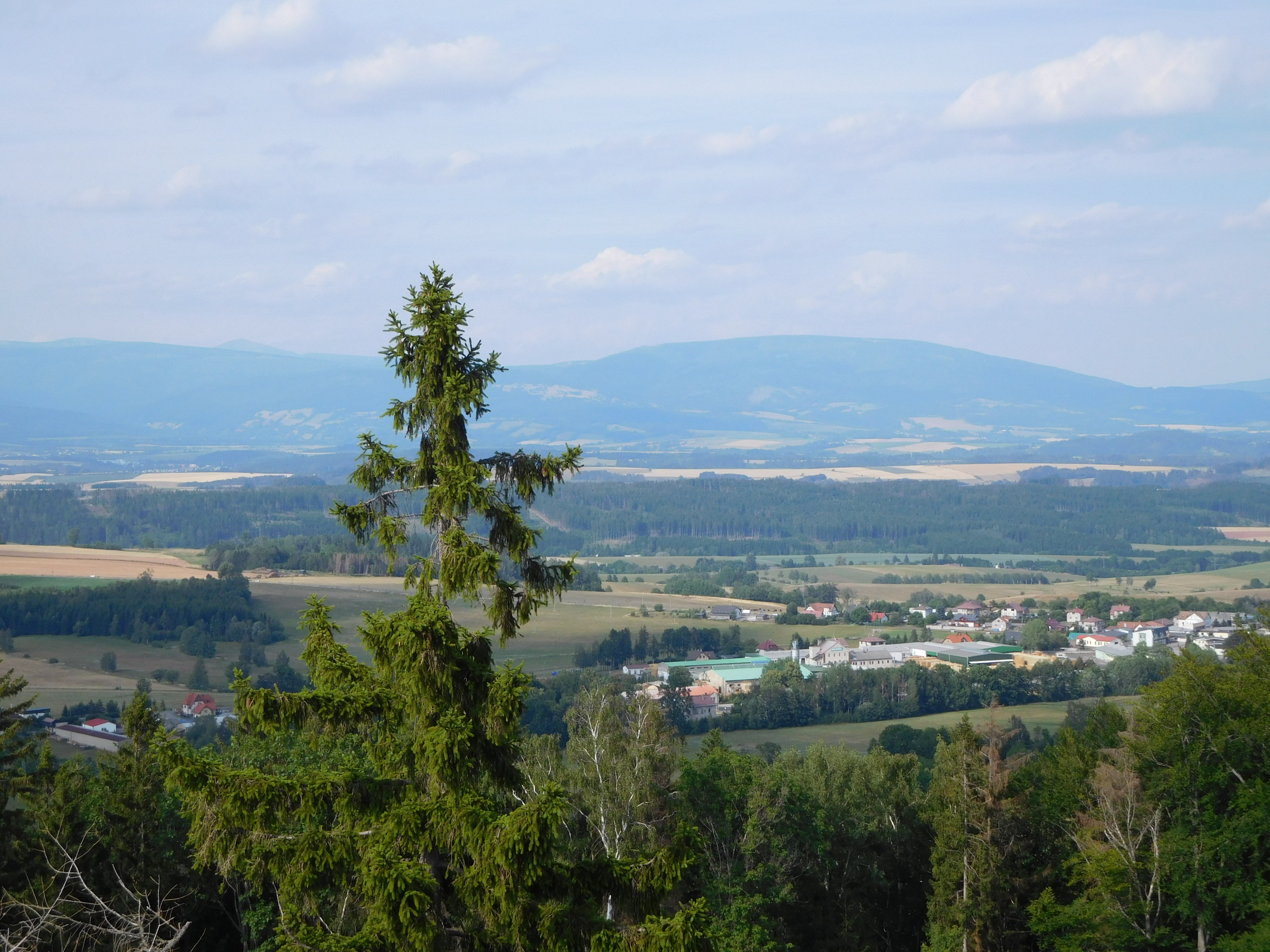
- View of Horka u Staré Paky and the Giant Mountains

- Flag Coat of arms

- Location in the Czech Republic
- Coordinates: 50°31′34″N 15°34′33″E
- Country: Czech Republic
- Region: Liberec
- District: Semily
- Founded: 1823

Area
  - Total: 2.03 km^{2} (0.78 sq mi)
- Elevation: 503 m (1,650 ft)

Population (2026-01-01)
  - Total: 233
  - Density: 115/km^{2} (297/sq mi)
- Time zone: UTC+1 (CET)
  - Summer (DST): UTC+2 (CEST)
- Postal code: 512 34
- Website: www.horkaustarepaky.cz

Horka u Staré Paky is a municipality and village in Semily District in the Liberec Region of the Czech Republic. It has about 200 inhabitants.

== Administrative division ==
Horka u Staré Paky consists of two municipal parts (in brackets population according to the 2021 census):

- Horka u Staré Paky (141)
- Nedaříž (103)

== Demographics ==
Historical population
Year	Pop.	±%
1869	449	—
1880	308	−31.4%
1890	324	+5.2%
1900	305	−5.9%
1910	365	+19.7%
1921	477	+30.7%
1930	456	−4.4%
1950	324	−28.9%
1961	340	+4.9%
1970	288	−15.3%
1980	296	+2.8%
1991	261	−11.8%
2001	255	−2.3%
2011	280	+9.8%
2021	244	−12.9%
Source: Censuses
