= Peřimov =

- Municipality
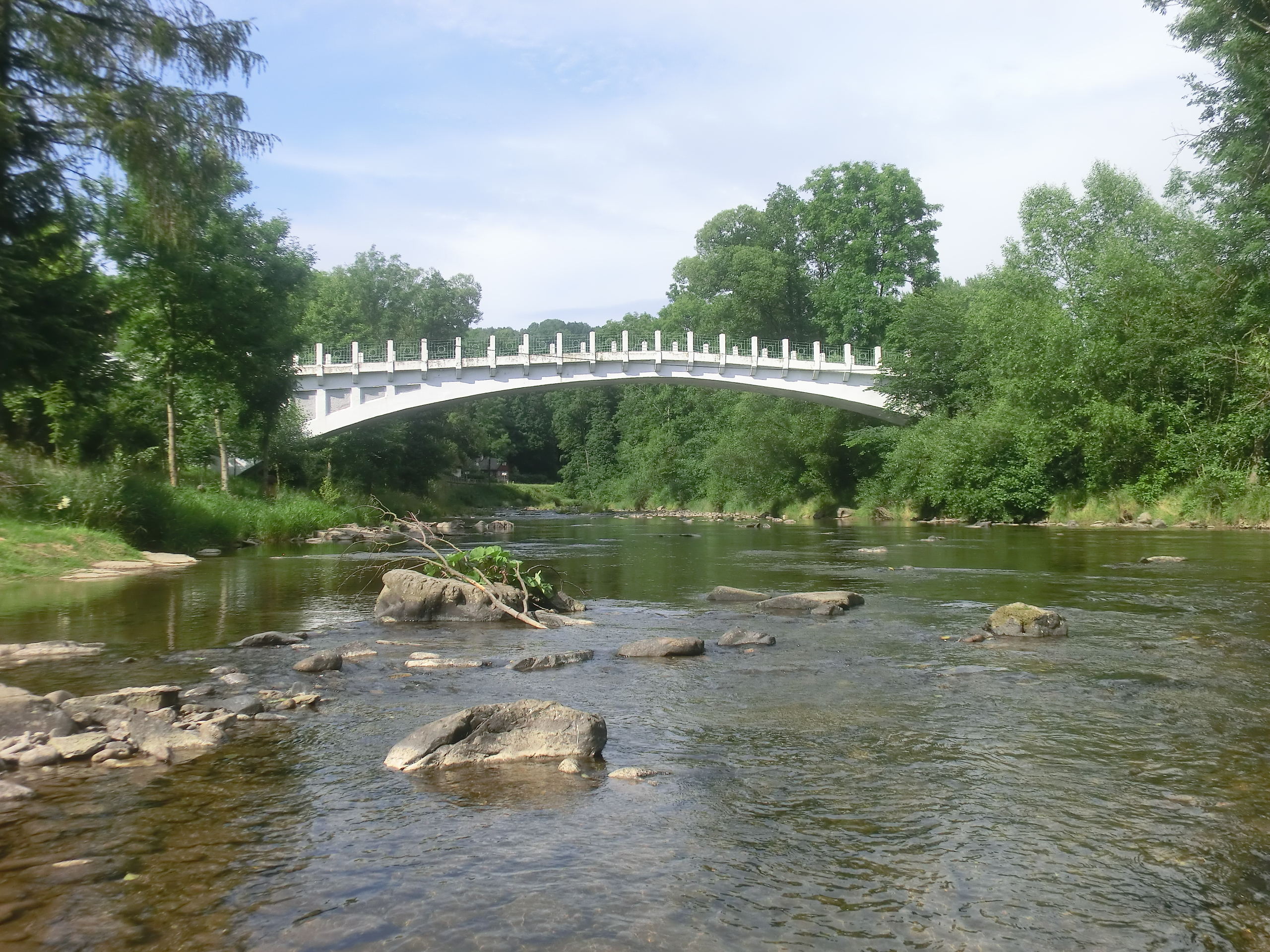
- Peřimov Bridge over the Jizera

- Flag Coat of arms

- Location in the Czech Republic
- Coordinates: 50°37′10″N 15°26′39″E
- Country: Czech Republic
- Region: Liberec
- District: Semily
- First mentioned: 1654

Area
  - Total: 6.64 km^{2} (2.56 sq mi)
- Elevation: 394 m (1,293 ft)

Population (2026-01-01)
  - Total: 282
  - Density: 42.5/km^{2} (110/sq mi)
- Time zone: UTC+1 (CET)
  - Summer (DST): UTC+2 (CEST)
- Postal code: 512 04
- Website: www.obecperimov.cz

Peřimov is a municipality and village in Semily District in the Liberec Region of the Czech Republic. It has about 300 inhabitants.

== Demographics ==
Historical population
| Year | Pop. | ±% |
|---|---|---|
| 1869 | 794 | — |
| 1880 | 781 | −1.6% |
| 1890 | 788 | +0.9% |
| 1900 | 817 | +3.7% |
| 1910 | 683 | −16.4% |
| 1921 | 656 | −4.0% |
| 1930 | 575 | −12.3% |
| 1950 | 369 | −35.8% |
| 1961 | 327 | −11.4% |
| 1970 | 281 | −14.1% |
| 1980 | 262 | −6.8% |
| 1991 | 222 | −15.3% |
| 2001 | 202 | −9.0% |
| 2011 | 228 | +12.9% |
| 2021 | 272 | +19.3% |
Source: Censuses
