= Ktová =

- Municipality
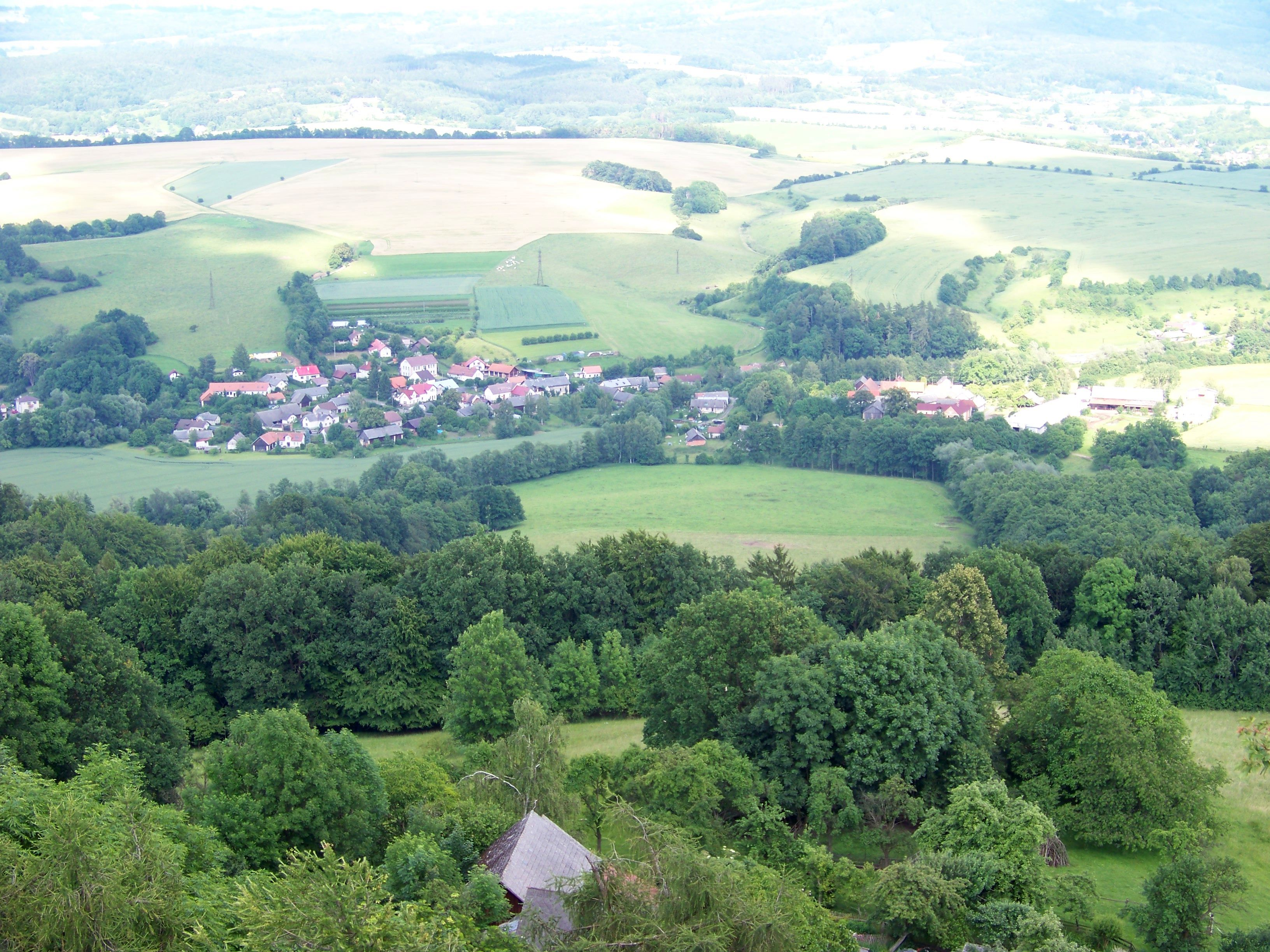
- View of Ktová from Trosky Castle

- Flag Coat of arms

- Location in the Czech Republic
- Coordinates: 50°31′12″N 15°14′49″E
- Country: Czech Republic
- Region: Liberec
- District: Semily
- First mentioned: 1320

Area
  - Total: 3.95 km^{2} (1.53 sq mi)
- Elevation: 285 m (935 ft)

Population (2026-01-01)
  - Total: 222
  - Density: 56.2/km^{2} (146/sq mi)
- Time zone: UTC+1 (CET)
  - Summer (DST): UTC+2 (CEST)
- Postal code: 512 63
- Website: ktova.cz

Ktová is a municipality and village in Semily District in the Liberec Region of the Czech Republic. It has about 200 inhabitants.

== Demographics ==
Historical population
| Year | Pop. | ±% |
|---|---|---|
| 1869 | 459 | — |
| 1880 | 427 | −7.0% |
| 1890 | 472 | +10.5% |
| 1900 | 429 | −9.1% |
| 1910 | 421 | −1.9% |
| 1921 | 403 | −4.3% |
| 1930 | 430 | +6.7% |
| 1950 | 346 | −19.5% |
| 1961 | 309 | −10.7% |
| 1970 | 261 | −15.5% |
| 1980 | 216 | −17.2% |
| 1991 | 192 | −11.1% |
| 2001 | 173 | −9.9% |
| 2011 | 186 | +7.5% |
| 2021 | 204 | +9.7% |
Source: Censuses
