= Bradlecká Lhota =

- Municipality
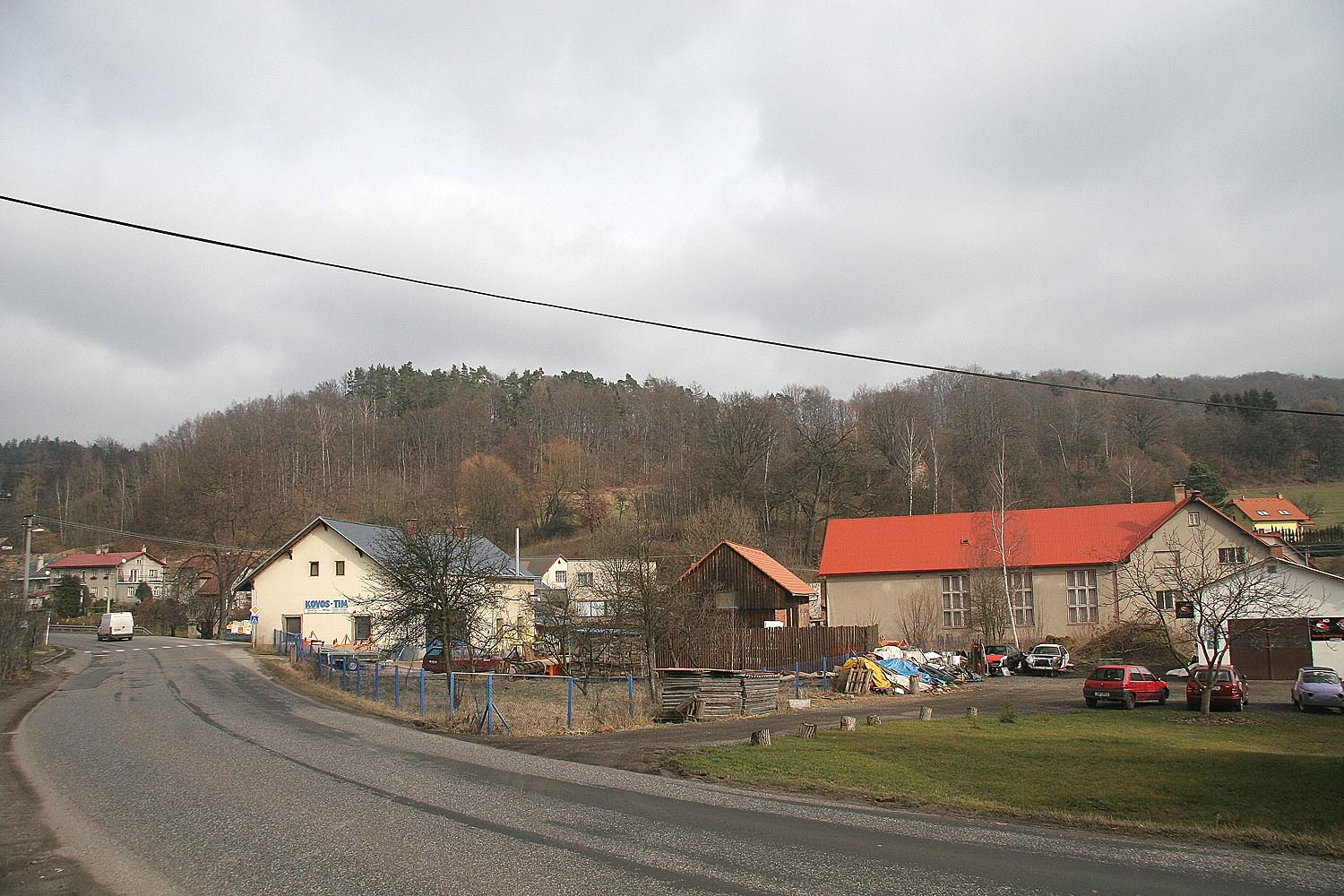
- Centre of the village

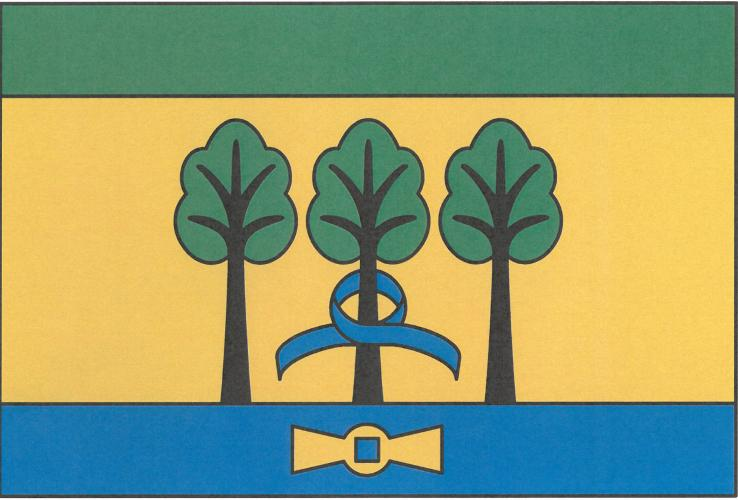
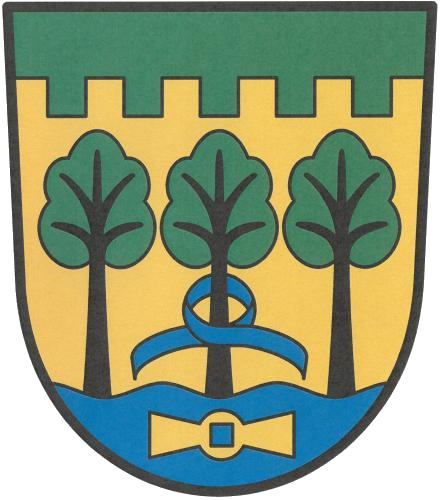
- Flag Coat of arms

- Location in the Czech Republic
- Coordinates: 50°29′19″N 15°23′47″E
- Country: Czech Republic
- Region: Liberec
- District: Semily
- First mentioned: 1395

Area
  - Total: 3.69 km^{2} (1.42 sq mi)
- Elevation: 335 m (1,099 ft)

Population (2026-01-01)
  - Total: 236
  - Density: 64.0/km^{2} (166/sq mi)
- Time zone: UTC+1 (CET)
  - Summer (DST): UTC+2 (CEST)
- Postal code: 507 13
- Website: www.bradleckalhota.cz

Bradlecká Lhota is a municipality and village in Semily District in the Liberec Region of the Czech Republic. It has about 200 inhabitants.

== Demographics ==
Historical population
Year	Pop.	±%
1869	423	—
1880	449	+6.1%
1890	440	−2.0%
1900	405	−8.0%
1910	371	−8.4%
1921	365	−1.6%
1930	356	−2.5%
1950	267	−25.0%
1961	274	+2.6%
1970	248	−9.5%
1980	225	−9.3%
1991	222	−1.3%
2001	201	−9.5%
2011	216	+7.5%
2021	236	+9.3%
Source: Censuses
