= Zernov (surname) =

Zernov (Russian: Зернов) is a surname. Notable people with the surname include:

- Aleksandr Zernov (born 1974), Russian footballer
- Nicholas Zernov (1898-1980), Christian Russian émigré
- Viktor Zernov (born 1945), Russian footballer and coach
