= Olešnice (Semily District) =

- Municipality
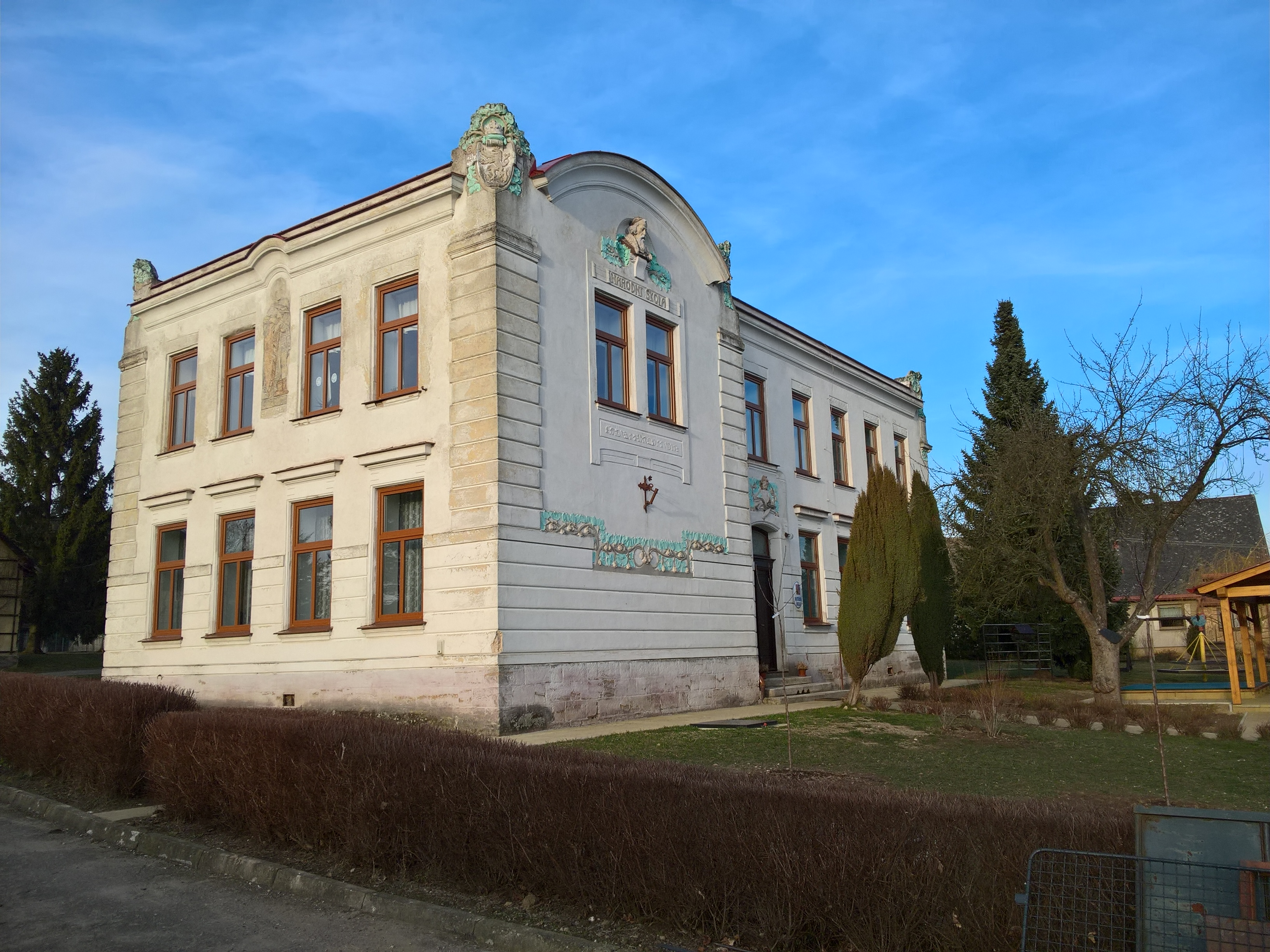
- Former national school, now a kindergarten

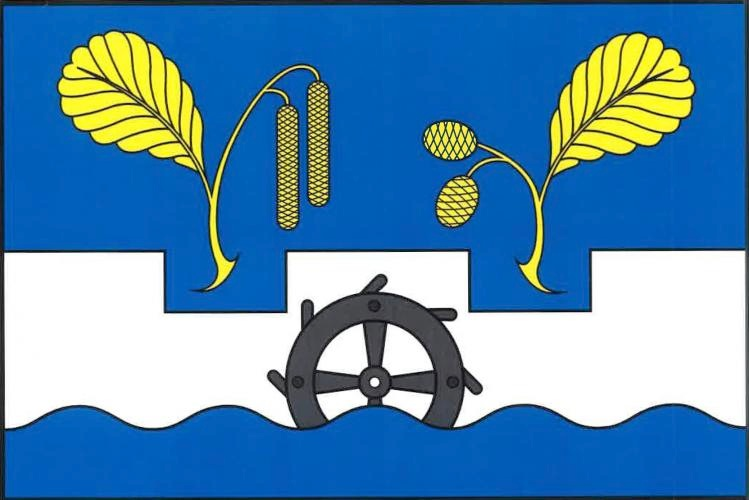
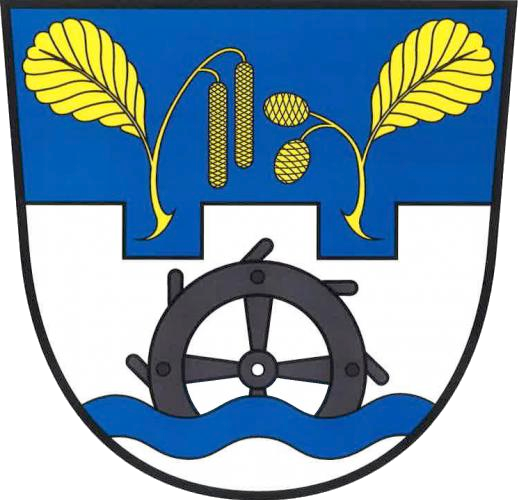
- Flag Coat of arms

- Location in the Czech Republic
- Coordinates: 50°32′42″N 15°7′9″E
- Country: Czech Republic
- Region: Liberec
- District: Semily
- First mentioned: 1318

Area
  - Total: 5.26 km^{2} (2.03 sq mi)
- Elevation: 286 m (938 ft)

Population (2026-01-01)
  - Total: 239
  - Density: 45.4/km^{2} (118/sq mi)
- Time zone: UTC+1 (CET)
  - Summer (DST): UTC+2 (CEST)
- Postal code: 511 01
- Website: olesnice.craj.cz

Olešnice is a municipality and village in Semily District in the Liberec Region of the Czech Republic. It has about 200 inhabitants.

== Administrative division ==
Olešnice consists of two municipal parts (in brackets population according to the 2021 census):

- Olešnice (163)
- Pohoří (52)

== Demographics ==
Historical population
Year	Pop.	±%
1869	462	—
1880	443	−4.1%
1890	457	+3.2%
1900	474	+3.7%
1910	452	−4.6%
1921	437	−3.3%
1930	433	−0.9%
1950	304	−29.8%
1961	314	+3.3%
1970	268	−14.6%
1980	219	−18.3%
1991	183	−16.4%
2001	179	−2.2%
2011	174	−2.8%
2021	215	+23.6%
Source: Censuses

== Notable people ==
- Adam Helcelet (born 1991), decathlete
