= Stružinec =

- Municipality
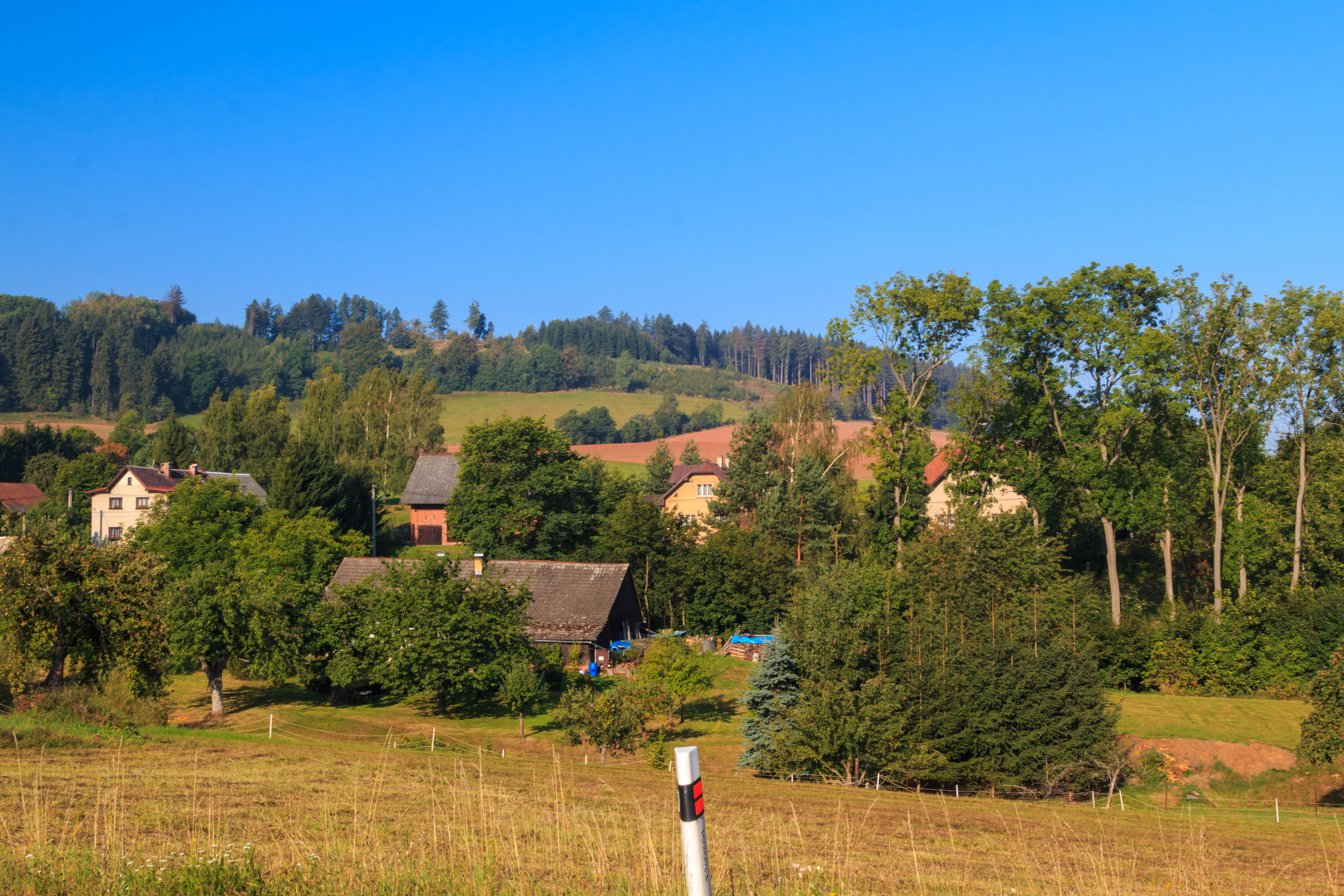
- Living houses in Stružinec

- Location in the Czech Republic
- Coordinates: 50°33′3″N 15°21′29″E
- Country: Czech Republic
- Region: Liberec
- District: Semily
- First mentioned: 1377

Area
  - Total: 11.22 km^{2} (4.33 sq mi)
- Elevation: 434 m (1,424 ft)

Population (2026-01-01)
  - Total: 690
  - Density: 61/km^{2} (160/sq mi)
- Time zone: UTC+1 (CET)
  - Summer (DST): UTC+2 (CEST)
- Postal code: 512 51
- Website: www.struzinec.cz

Stružinec is a municipality and village in Semily District in the Liberec Region of the Czech Republic. It has about 700 inhabitants.

== Administrative division ==
Stružinec consists of four municipal parts (in brackets population according to the 2021 census):

- Stružinec (509)
- Bezděčín (5)
- Pohoří (48)
- Tuhaň (99)

== Demographics ==
Historical population
Year	Pop.	±%
1869	1,407	—
1880	1,362	−3.2%
1890	1,382	+1.5%
1900	1,351	−2.2%
1910	1,377	+1.9%
1921	1,249	−9.3%
1930	1,300	+4.1%
1950	1,001	−23.0%
1961	1,017	+1.6%
1970	922	−9.3%
1980	836	−9.3%
1991	740	−11.5%
2001	692	−6.5%
2011	679	−1.9%
2021	661	−2.7%
Source: Censuses
