= Žernov (Semily District) =

- Municipality
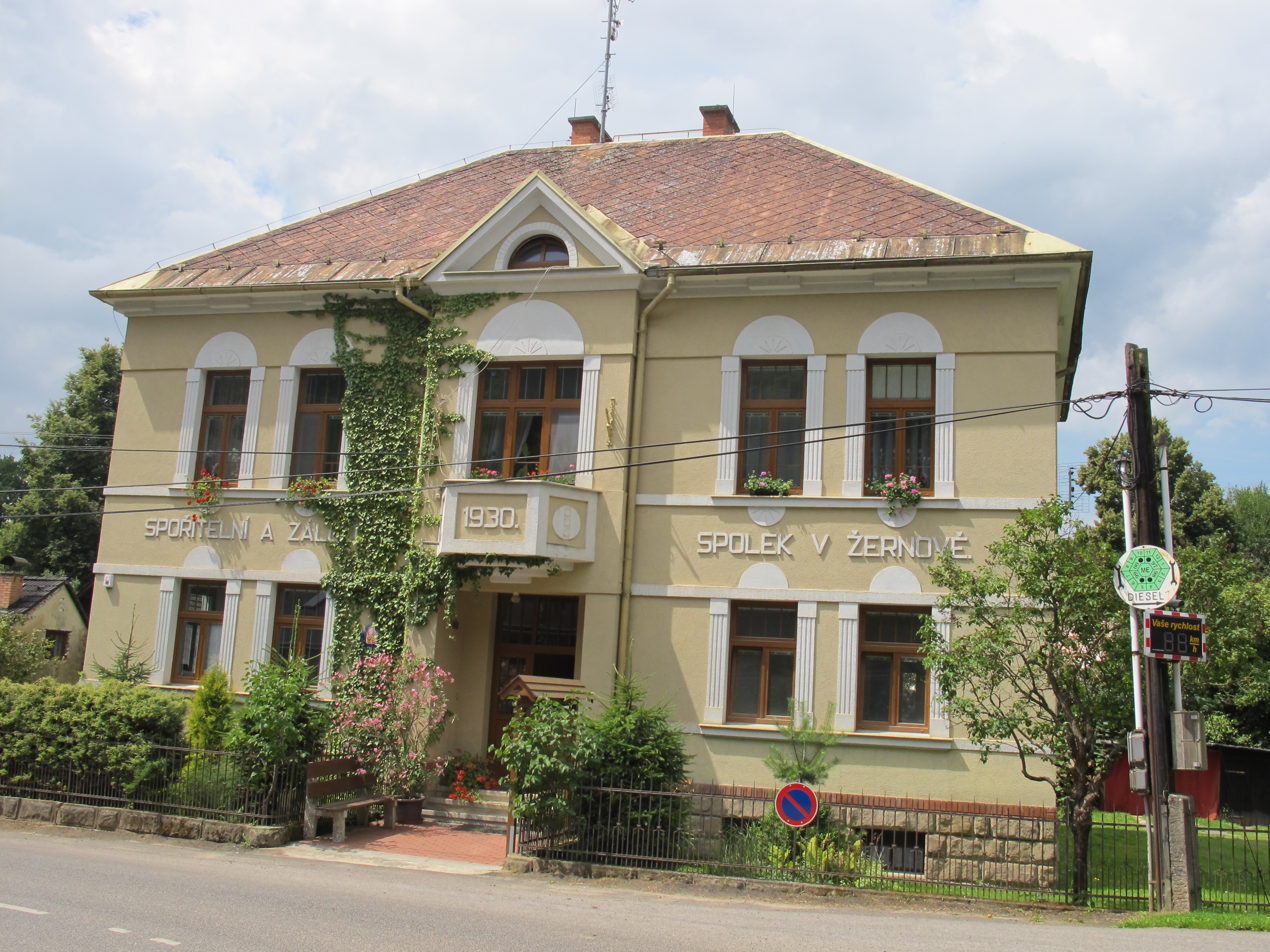
- Municipal office

- Flag Coat of arms

- Location in the Czech Republic
- Coordinates: 50°33′24″N 15°16′11″E
- Country: Czech Republic
- Region: Liberec
- District: Semily
- First mentioned: 1375

Area
  - Total: 4.85 km^{2} (1.87 sq mi)
- Elevation: 339 m (1,112 ft)

Population (2026-01-01)
  - Total: 245
  - Density: 50.5/km^{2} (131/sq mi)
- Time zone: UTC+1 (CET)
  - Summer (DST): UTC+2 (CEST)
- Postal code: 512 63
- Website: zernov.info

Žernov is a municipality and village in Semily District in the Liberec Region of the Czech Republic. It has about 200 inhabitants.

== Administrative division ==
Žernov consists of five municipal parts (in brackets population according to the 2021 census):

- Žernov (69)
- Křečovice 1.díl (4)
- Podtýn (18)
- Proseč (12)
- Sýkořice (67)

== Demographics ==
Historical population
Year	Pop.	±%
1869	525	—
1880	519	−1.1%
1890	525	+1.2%
1900	488	−7.0%
1910	496	+1.6%
1921	456	−8.1%
1930	403	−11.6%
1950	312	−22.6%
1961	269	−13.8%
1970	234	−13.0%
1980	206	−12.0%
1991	173	−16.0%
2001	185	+6.9%
2011	247	+33.5%
2021	170	−31.2%
Source: Censuses
