= Plavy =

- Municipality
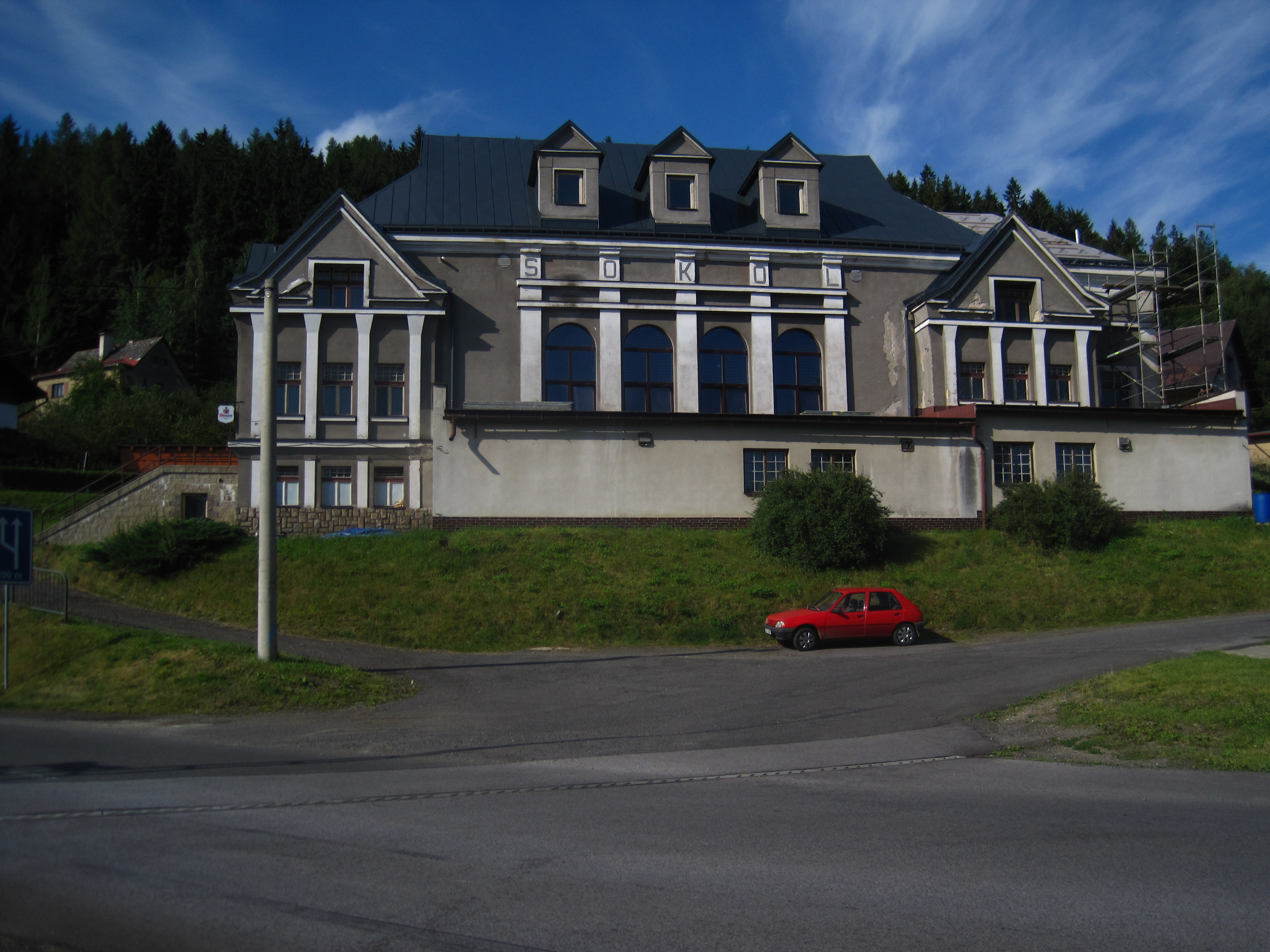
- Sokol hall in Plavy

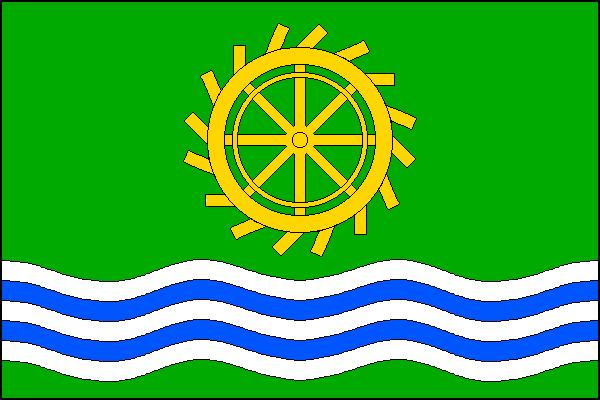
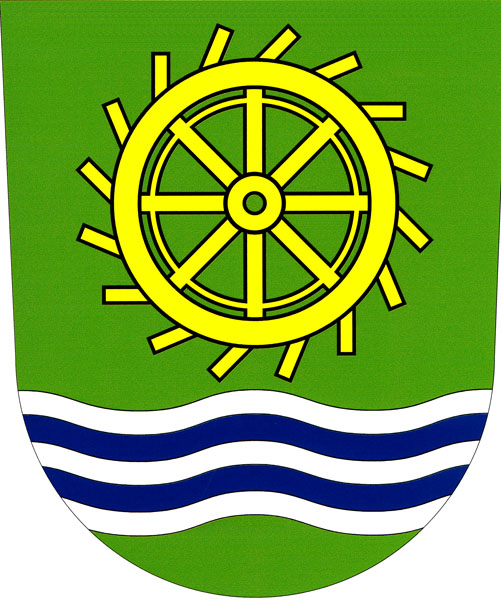
- Flag Coat of arms

- Location in the Czech Republic
- Coordinates: 50°42′12″N 15°19′3″E
- Country: Czech Republic
- Region: Liberec
- District: Jablonec nad Nisou
- First mentioned: 1624

Area
  - Total: 5.20 km^{2} (2.01 sq mi)
- Elevation: 403 m (1,322 ft)

Population (2026-01-01)
  - Total: 1,024
  - Density: 197/km^{2} (510/sq mi)
- Time zone: UTC+1 (CET)
  - Summer (DST): UTC+2 (CEST)
- Postal code: 468 46
- Website: www.plavy.cz

Plavy is a municipality and village in Jablonec nad Nisou District in the Liberec Region of the Czech Republic. It has about 1,000 inhabitants.

== Administrative division ==
Plavy consists of two municipal parts (in brackets population according to the 2021 census):

- Plavy (524)
- Haratice (488)

== Etymology ==
The name is derived from the Czech word plav, which denoted a place where timber was rafted.

== Geography ==
Plavy is located about 10 kilometres (6 mi) east of Jablonec nad Nisou and 18 km (11 mi) east of Liberec. It lies mostly in the Giant Mountains Foothills, only a small part of the municipal territory in the northwest extends into the Jizera Mountains. The highest point is at 580 m (1,900 ft) above sea level. The Kamenice River flows through the municipality.

== History ==
The first written mention of Plavy is from 1624.

== Demographics ==
Historical population

Year	Pop.	±%
1869	1,048	—
1880	1,130	+7.8%
1890	1,296	+14.7%
1900	1,504	+16.0%
1910	1,816	+20.7%

Year	Pop.	±%
1921	1,700	−6.4%
1930	1,927	+13.4%
1950	1,245	−35.4%
1961	1,297	+4.2%
1970	1,272	−1.9%

Year	Pop.	±%
1980	1,295	+1.8%
1991	1,173	−9.4%
2001	1,084	−7.6%
2011	1,034	−4.6%
2021	1,012	−2.1%

Source: Censuses

== Transport ==
The I/10 road (part of the European route E65) from Turnov to the Czech–Polish border in Harrachov runs through the municipality.

Plavy is located on the railway line Prague–Tanvald.

== Sport ==
Plavy is known for a small ski resort. There are three downhill routes.

== Sights ==
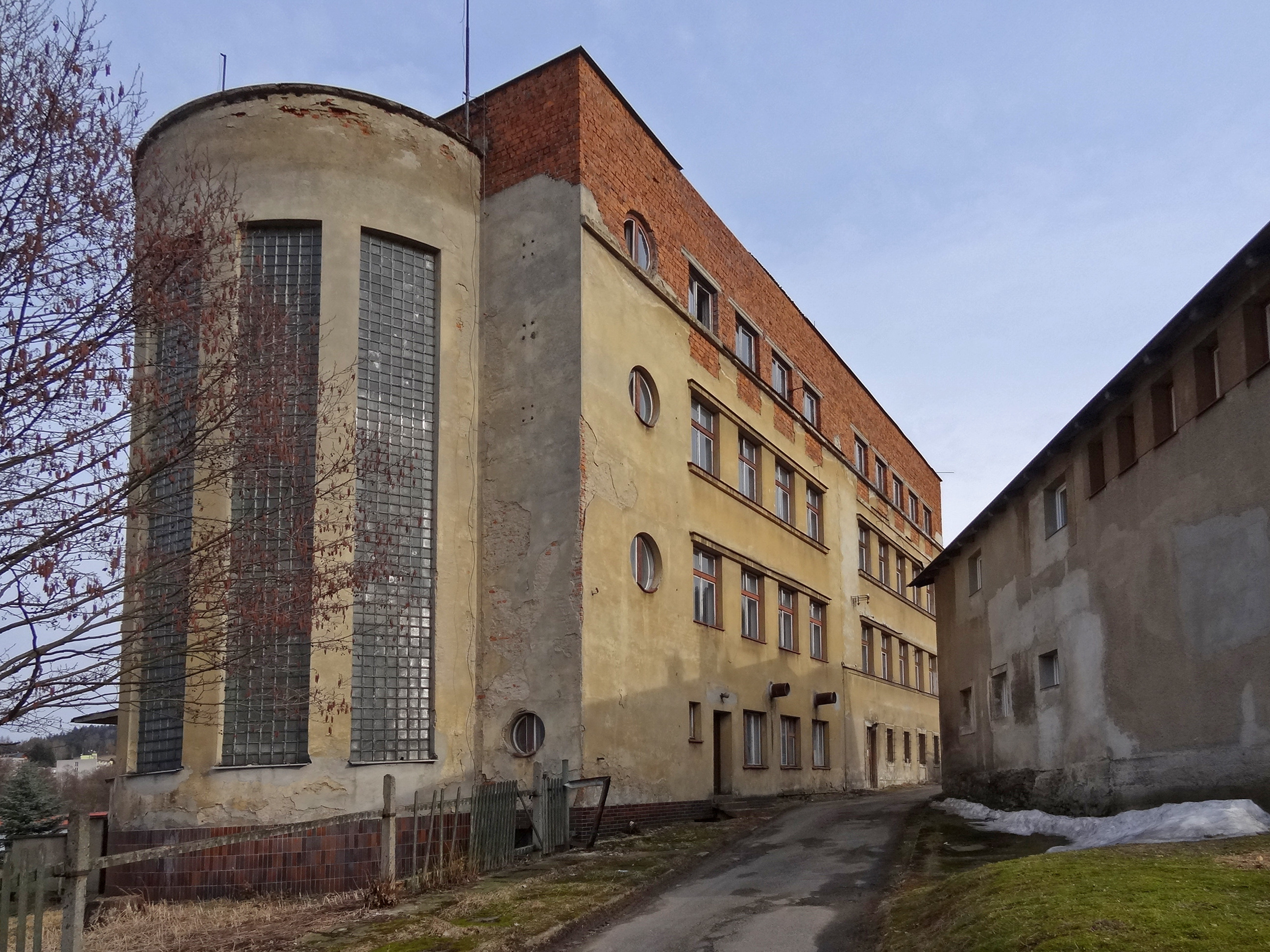
Administrative building of Brůna's factory

The only protected cultural monuments in the municipality are the Art Nouveau house of the factory owner František Brůna, and the administrative building of Brůna's glass factory from the 1920s.

== Notable people ==
- Josef Jindřišek (born 1981), footballer

== Twin towns – sister cities ==
Plavy is twinned with:

- Paszowice, Poland
