= Velké Hamry =

- Town
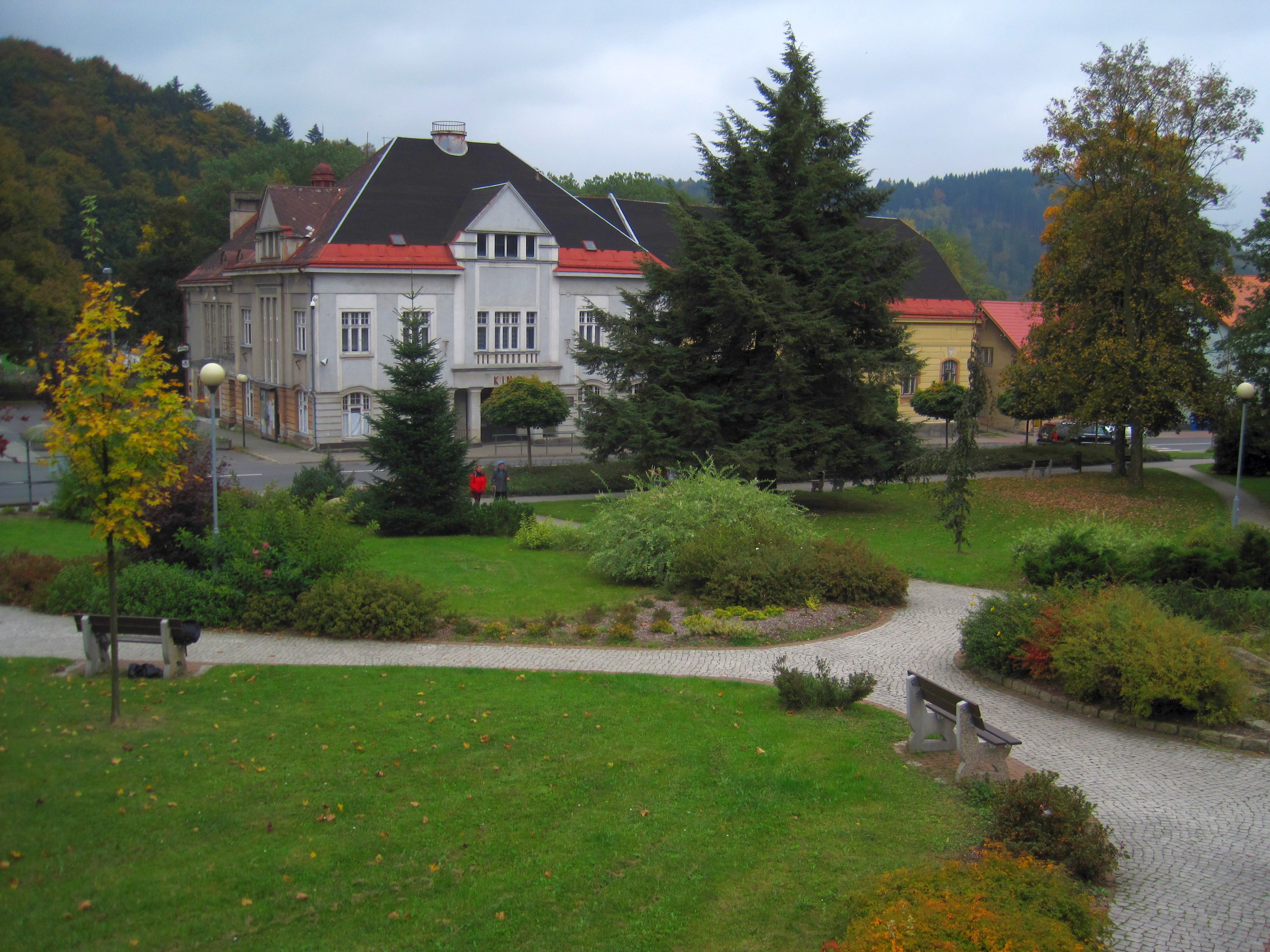
- Square in Velké Hamry

- Flag Coat of arms

- Location in the Czech Republic
- Coordinates: 50°42′50″N 15°18′56″E
- Country: Czech Republic
- Region: Liberec
- District: Jablonec nad Nisou
- First mentioned: 1624

Government
  - Mayor: Jaroslav Najman

Area
  - Total: 9.32 km^{2} (3.60 sq mi)
- Elevation: 412 m (1,352 ft)

Population (2026-01-01)
  - Total: 2,716
  - Density: 291/km^{2} (755/sq mi)
- Time zone: UTC+1 (CET)
  - Summer (DST): UTC+2 (CEST)
- Postal code: 468 45
- Website: www.velke-hamry.cz

Velké Hamry (Czech pronunciation: [ˈvɛlkɛː ˈɦamrɪ]; German: Großhammer, Groß Hammer) is a town in Jablonec nad Nisou District in the Liberec Region of the Czech Republic. It has about 2,700 inhabitants. The town is located on the Kamenice River in the Jizera Mountains.

== Administrative division ==
Velké Hamry consists of two municipal parts (in brackets population according to the 2021 census):

- Velké Hamry (2,464)
- Bohdalovice (153)

== Etymology ==
The town's name literally means 'great hammer mills' in Czech and refers to hammer mills that stood here probably in the 13th and 14th centuries.

== Geography ==
Velké Hamry is located about 10 kilometres (6 mi) east of Jablonec nad Nisou. It lies in the Jizera Mountains. The highest point is the mountain Pustina at 831 m (2,726 ft) above sea level. The Kamenice River flows through the town.

== History ==
In the area of today's Velké Hamry there were two hamlets called Dolení ('lower') Hamr and Hoření ('upper') Hamr. In 1914, the two hamlets were merged and created a new municipality named Velké Hamry. In 1926, it was promoted to a market town. In 1926, Bohdalovice and Svárov joined the market town. Velké Hamry was promoted to a town in 1968.

== Demographics ==
Historical population

Year	Pop.	±%
1869	2,774	—
1880	3,305	+19.1%
1890	3,362	+1.7%
1900	4,132	+22.9%
1910	4,867	+17.8%

Year	Pop.	±%
1921	4,033	−17.1%
1930	4,300	+6.6%
1950	2,582	−40.0%
1961	2,531	−2.0%
1970	2,273	−10.2%

Year	Pop.	±%
1980	2,118	−6.8%
1991	2,063	−2.6%
2001	2,721	+31.9%
2011	2,811	+3.3%
2021	2,617	−6.9%

Source: Censuses

== Transport ==
The I/10 road from Turnov to the Czech–Polish border in Harrachov runs through the town.

Velké Hamry is located on the railway line Železný Brod–Tanvald.

== Sights ==
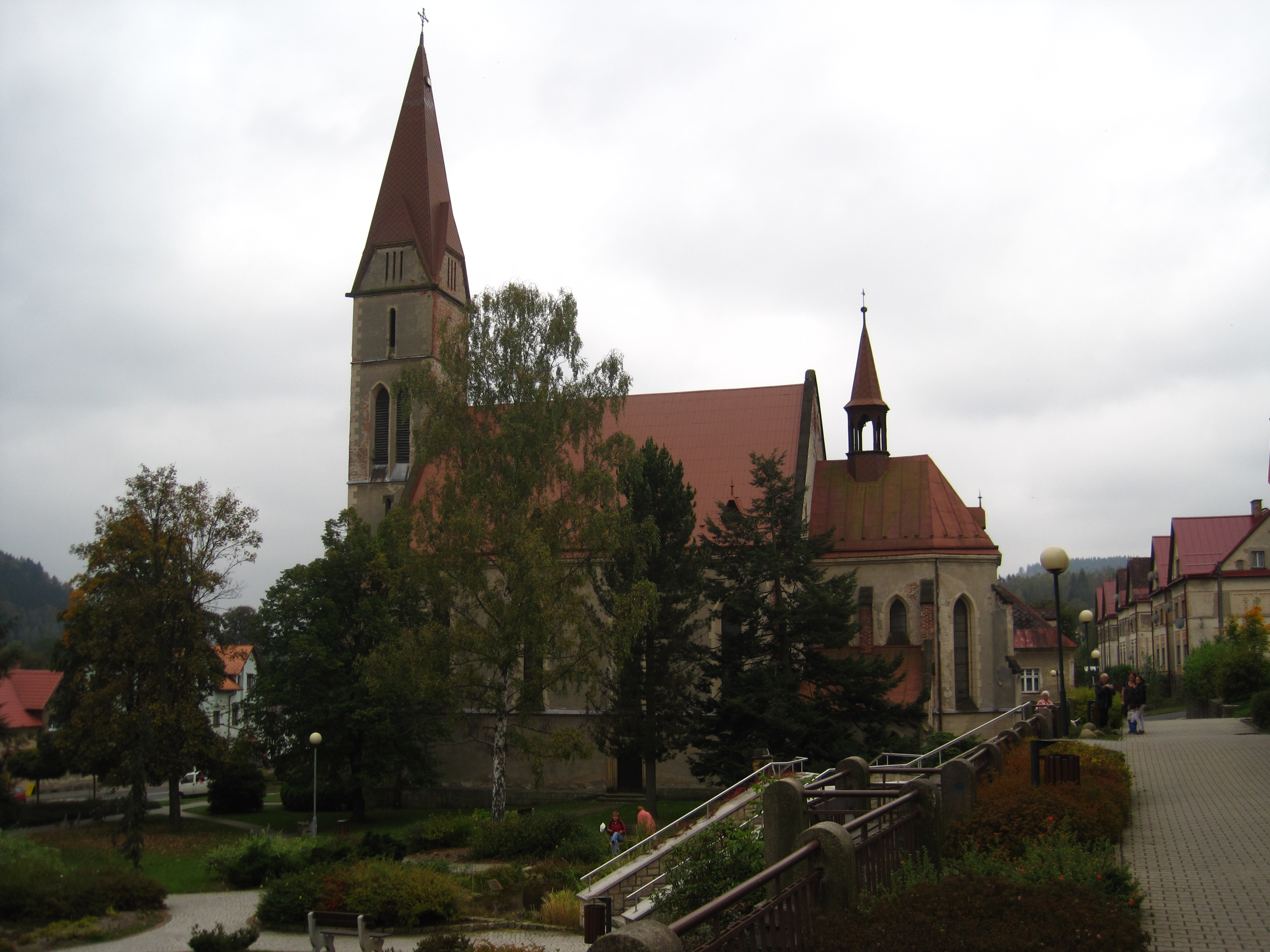
Church of Saint Wenceslaus

The main landmark of Velké Hamry is the Church of Saint Wenceslaus. It was built in the neo-Gothic style in 1915–1925.
