= Gustav Leutelt =

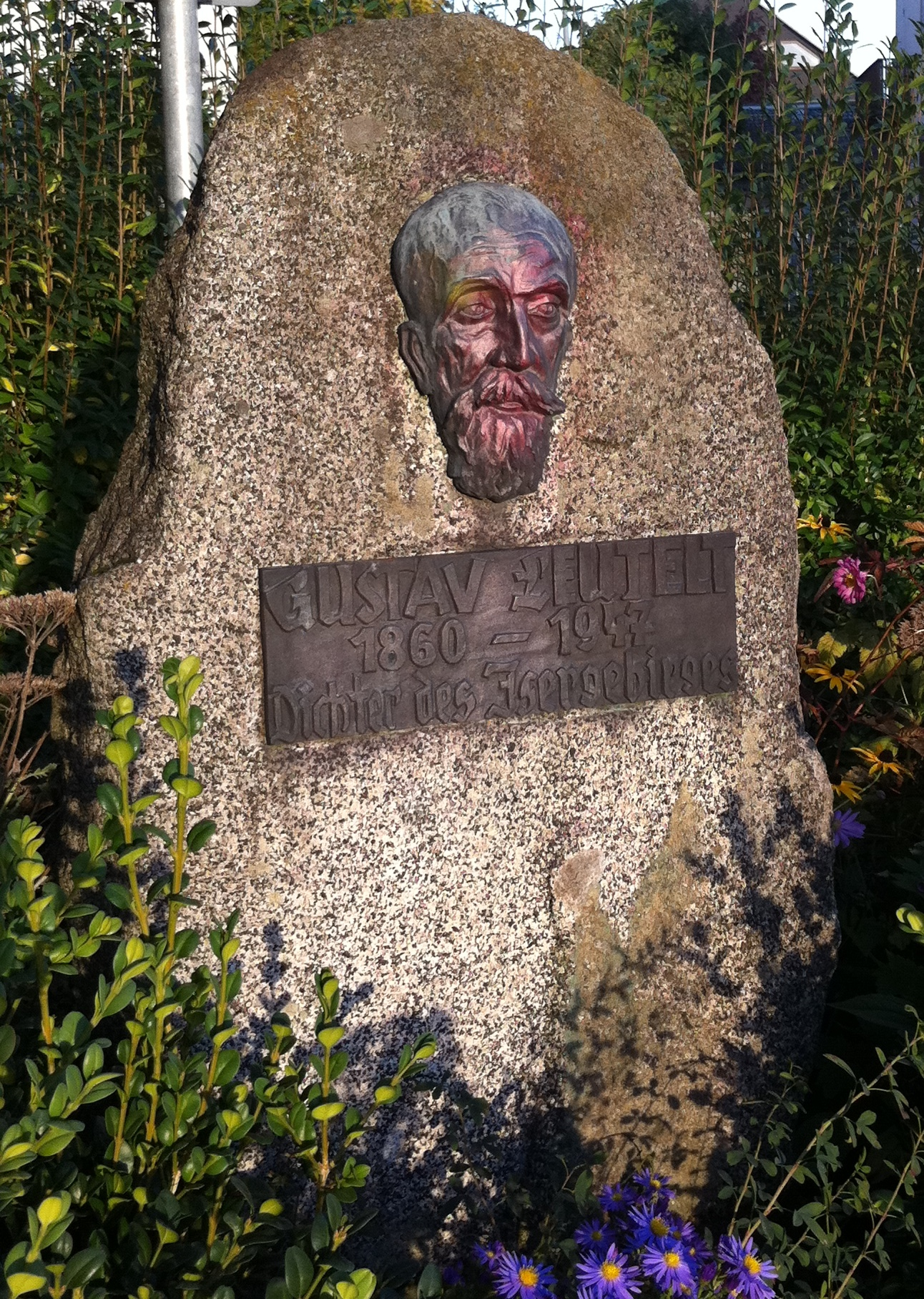
- Gustav Leutelt-Denkmal in Wiesbaden
- Born: 21 September 1860; Josefsthal, Bohemia, Austrian Empire
- Died: 17 February 1947 (aged 86); Seebergen, Germany
- Occupation: Poet
- Writing career
- Language: German

Gustav Leutelt (21 September 1860 – 17 February 1947) was a German Bohemian poet and writer. Most of his poetry concerned the area around his birthplace of Josefsthal, causing him to be described as a "poet of the Jizera Mountains."

== Life ==
Leutelt was born the son of a teacher in Josefsthal in the Jizera Mountains, northern Bohemia, then a part of the Austrian Empire, now the Czech Republic. He was the great-grandson of the "miracle doctor" Josef Johann Kittel. Leutelt settled in Litoměřice to train at a teachers' training college and work as a teacher at the elementary school of his father. As a senior teacher, he took over the local elementary school in the nearby town of Untermaxdorf (Dolní Maxov) first but later at the training college. At this institution he came into contact with glass workers and he chose this craft as his life's study. In 1906, he founded a museum in Untermaxdorf, in which he documented the history and economy of the Upper Kamenice valley. After 1922 he moved as a pensioner near Jablonec nad Nisou.

As a result of the Beneš decrees, Leutelt, an 85-year-old, was expelled from his home in 1946. He died in 1947 in Seebergen, Germany at the age of 86. His gravestone in the cemetery of Seebergen reads: "Here rests away his beloved forest homeland, a former champion of German art, Gustav Leutelt, poet of the Jizera Mountains, born in Josefsthal on 21 September 1860; 17 February 1947 died in Seebergen." At the memorial is a plaque: "This memorial stone was donated by Gablonzer compatriots of the Jizera Mountains in the Sudetenland from which the people of Thuringia were expelled in 1945. Renewed by the Leutelt Society in Schwäbisch Gmünd in 2002".

== Quotes ==
"The home is not everything but rather the root system of the rising World Tree. Neither patriotism, as escapism, or the global love for the homeland of contempt are good. Home education is probably not an end in itself, but it should lead to respect from the home. And we must find a way to this, it's possible even for those who are alienated. Global love in our heart for the home is the ultimate."

== Awards and honors ==
- 1935 Joseph-Freiherr-von-Eichendorff-Preis (Joseph Freiherr von Eichendorff Prize)

== Works ==
- Schilderungen aus dem Isergebirge, 1899 (Descriptions of the Jizera Mountains, 1899)
- Die Königshäuser, 1906 (The royal, 1906)
- Das zweite Gesicht, 1911 (The Good Son, 1911)
- Hüttenheimat, 1919 (Cottage home, 1919)
- Aus den Iserbergen. (From the Iserbergen. Erzählungen, 1920 Fiction, 1920)
- Der Glaswald, 1925 (The Glass Forest, 1925)
- Das Buch vom Walde, 1928 (The book of the Grove, 1928)
- Bilder aus dem Leben der Glasarbeiter, 1929 (Images from the life of the glass workers, 1929)
- Siebzig Jahre meines Lebens, 1930 (Seventy years of my life, 1930)
- Johannisnacht. St. John's Night. Sudetendeutsche Geschichten, 1930 (Sudeten German stories, 1930)
- Doktor Kittel, 1943 (Doctor Kittel, 1943)
- Glasmacher, 1944 (Glasmacher, 1944)
- Schicksal, 1944 (Fate, 1944)

=== Collections ===
- Gesammelte Werke in drei Bänden, Karlsbad: Adam Kraft Verlag 1934–1936 (2. Aufl. 1941–1943) (Collected works in three volumes, Carlsbad: Adam Kraft Verlag 1934–1936 (2nd edition 1941–1943))
- Gustav Leutelt. Gustav Leutelt. Gesamtausgabe in zwei Bänden, hrsg. (Complete edition in two volumes, ed. v. Adalbert Schmidt. Adalbert von Schmidt. Augsburg: Adam Kraft Verlag 1953–1955 Augsburg: Adam Kraft Verlag 1953–1955)
- Gesamtausgabe in fünf Bänden, Schwäbisch Gmünd: Leutelt-Gesellschaft 1986–1990 (Complete edition in five volumes, Schwäbisch Gmünd: Leutelt Society 1986–1990 )
