= List of classical composers in the German Democratic Republic =

This list contains famous classical music composers who have lived in East Germany.

== B ==
- Thomas Böttger (1954)
- Reiner Bredemeyer (1929–1995)
- Max Butting (1888–1976)

== D ==
- Paul Dessau (1894–1979)
- Gerd Domhardt (1945–1997)

== E ==
- Hanns Eisler (1898–1962)

== F ==
- Fidelio F. Finke (1891–1968)

== G ==
- Fritz Geißler (1921–1984)
- Ottmar Gerster (1897–1969)
- Lutz Glandien (1954)
- Friedrich Goldmann (1941–2009)

== H ==
- Wolfgang Hohensee (1927)

== K ==
- Georg Katzer (1935–2019)
- Günter Kochan (1930–2009)
- Rainer Kunad (1936–1995)

== M ==
- Siegfried Matthus (1934–2021)
- Rudolf Mauersberger (1889–1971)
- Tilo Medek (1940–2006)
- Ernst Hermann Meyer (1905–1988)

== N ==
- Gerd Natschinski (1928–2015)
- Wilhelm Neef (1916–1990)
- Walter Niemann (1876–1953)

== S ==
- Steffen Schleiermacher (1960)
- Kurt Schwaen (1909–2007)
- Leo Spies (1899–1965)

== T ==
- Johannes Paul Thilman (1906–1973)
- Georg Trexler (1903–1979)

== U ==
- Jakob Ullmann (1958)

== W ==
- Rudolf Wagner-Régeny (1903–1969)
- H. Johannes Wallmann (1952)

== Z ==
- Ruth Zechlin (1926–2007)
- Udo Zimmermann (1943–2021)
