= Josefův Důl Reservoir =

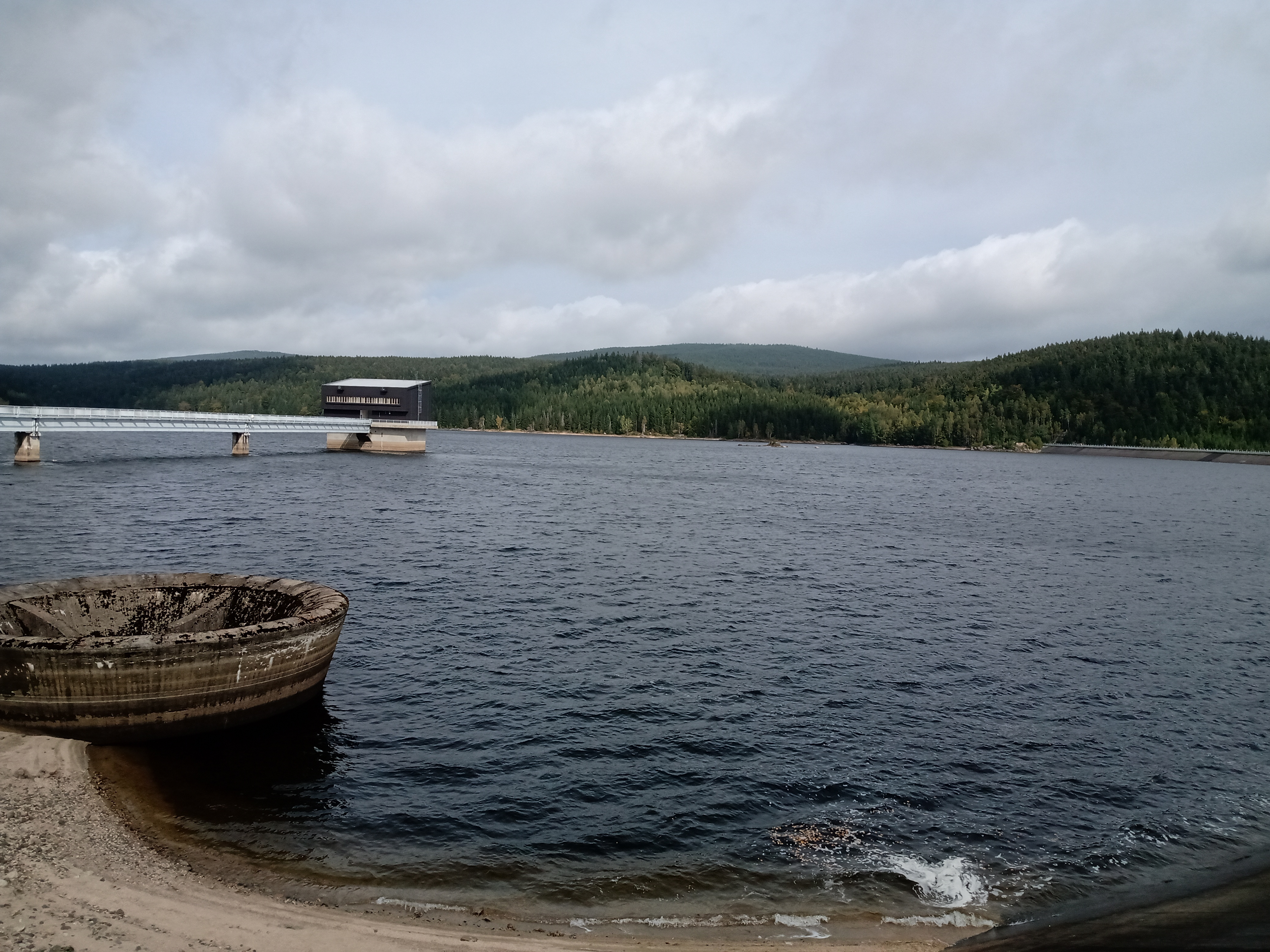
- General view

- Location within Czech Republic
- Coordinates: 50°47′41″N 15°11′44″E
- Type: reservoir
- Primary inflows: Kamenice, Hluboký potok, Blatný potok, Červený potok
- Primary outflows: Kamenice
- Basin countries: Czech Republic
- Surface area: 130.1 ha (321 acres)
- Max. depth: 44 m (144 ft)
- Water volume: 23,000,000 m^{3} (19,000 acre⋅ft)
- Surface elevation: 730 m (2,400 ft)

The Josefův Důl Reservoir (Czech: vodní nádrž Josefův Důl) is a reservoir in Josefův Důl in the Liberec Region of the Czech Republic. It was built on the Kamenice River in 1976–1982 and is the largest reservoir in the Jizera Mountains.

The reservoir has an area of 130.1 ha (321 acres). The dam has a height of 43 m (141 ft) and a length of 720 m (2,360 ft). The reservoir has a capacity of 23 million cubic metres and its maximal depth is 44 m (144 ft). Its main purpose is the supply of drinking water, so recreational activities are not permitted upon it.
