= Hohensee =

Hohensee may refer to:

- Mike Hohensee (born 1961), football coach
- Wolfgang Hohensee (1927–2018), German composer

== Places ==
- Hohensee, a suburb of Zemitz, in Mecklenburg-Vorpommern
