= Jesenný =

- Municipality
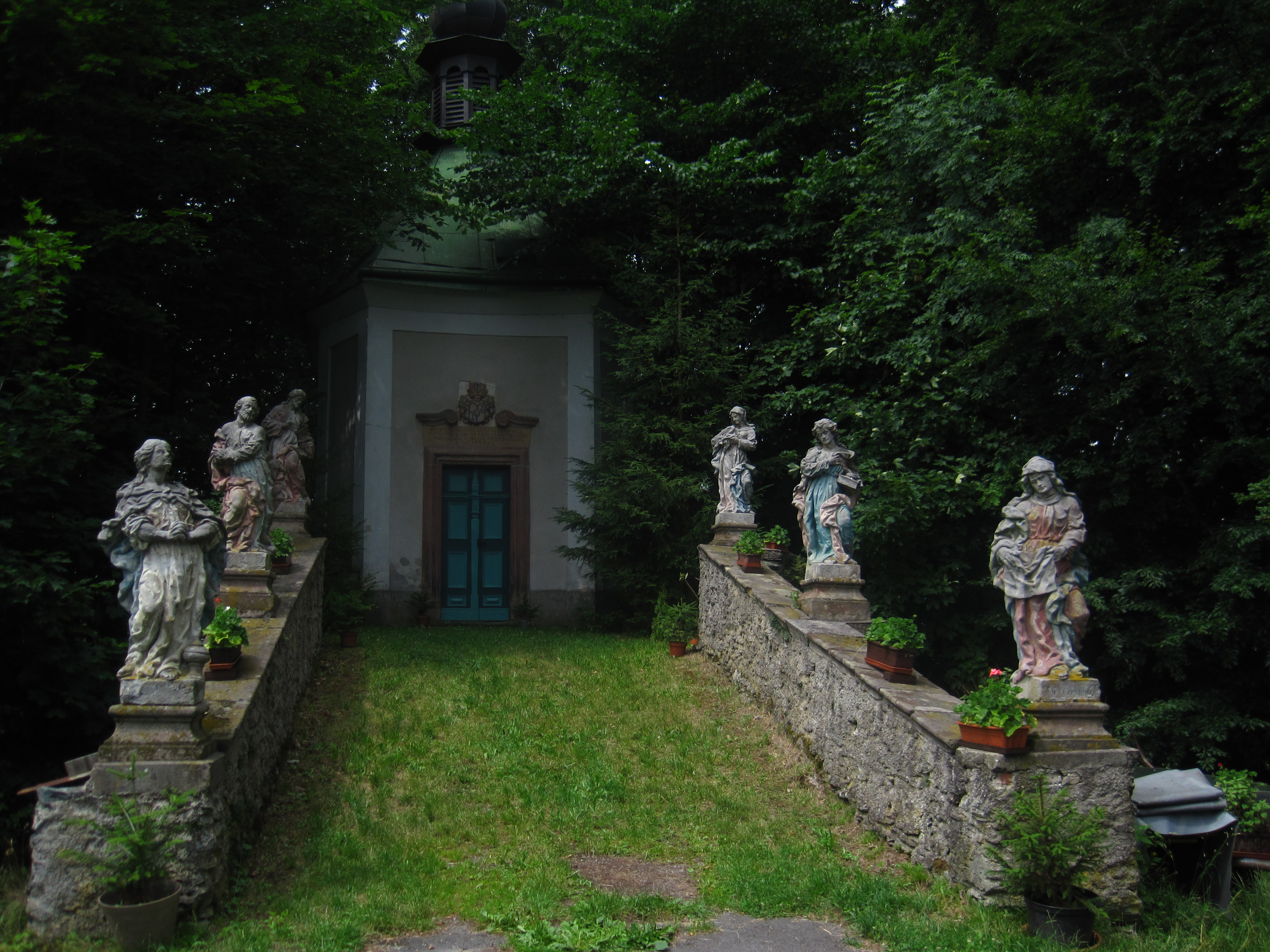
- Chapel of the Exaltation of the Holy Cross

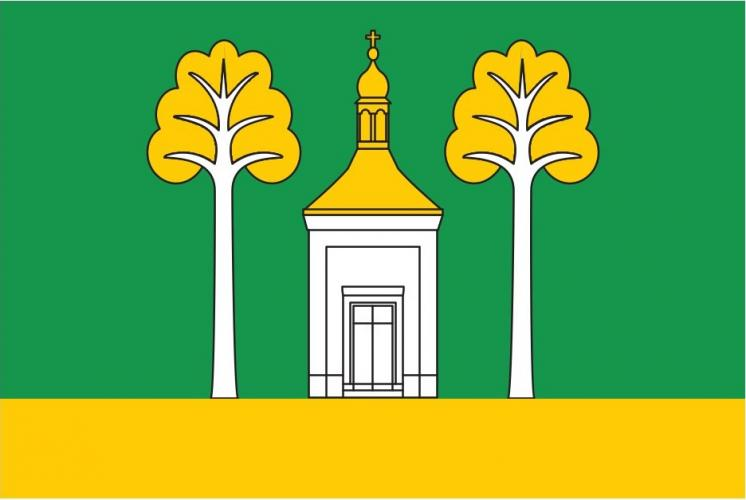
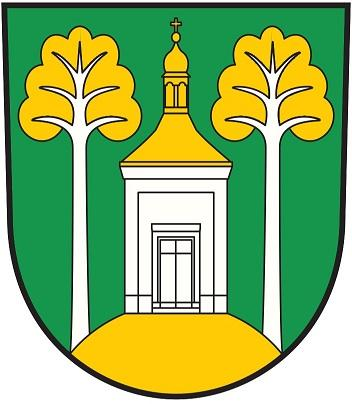
- Flag Coat of arms

- Location in the Czech Republic
- Coordinates: 50°39′28″N 15°20′19″E
- Country: Czech Republic
- Region: Liberec
- District: Semily
- First mentioned: 1356

Area
  - Total: 7.84 km^{2} (3.03 sq mi)
- Elevation: 433 m (1,421 ft)

Population (2026-01-01)
  - Total: 511
  - Density: 65.2/km^{2} (169/sq mi)
- Time zone: UTC+1 (CET)
  - Summer (DST): UTC+2 (CEST)
- Postal codes: 512 12, 513 01
- Website: www.jesenny.cz

Jesenný (German: Jessenei) is a municipality and village in Semily District in the Liberec Region of the Czech Republic. It has about 500 inhabitants.

== Administrative division ==
Jesenný consists of two municipal parts (in brackets population according to the 2021 census):

- Jesenný (453)
- Bohuňovsko (10)

== Etymology ==
The name Jesenný is derived from the Czech word jasan (i.e. 'ash'; in Old Czech jesen) and the adjective jesenný, and originally referred to a stream flowing between ash trees.

== Geography ==
Jesenný is located about 6 kilometres (4 mi) north of Semily and 21 km (13 mi) southeast of Liberec. It lies in a hilly landscape in the Giant Mountains Foothills. The highest point is at 617 m (2,024 ft) above sea level. The Kamenice River flows along the western municipal border and the Vošmenda Stream flows along the eastern border. The stream Jesenský potok branches off from the Vošmenda, flows through the village, and then joins the Kamenice.

== History ==
The first written mention of Jesenný is from 1356.

== Demographics ==
Historical population

Year	Pop.	±%
1869	1,234	—
1880	1,222	−1.0%
1890	1,207	−1.2%
1900	1,249	+3.5%
1910	1,339	+7.2%

Year	Pop.	±%
1921	1,177	−12.1%
1930	1,136	−3.5%
1950	760	−33.1%
1961	789	+3.8%
1970	699	−11.4%

Year	Pop.	±%
1980	596	−14.7%
1991	554	−7.0%
2001	516	−6.9%
2011	485	−6.0%
2021	463	−4.5%

Source: Censuses

== Transport ==
Jesenný is located on the railway line Prague–Tanvald.

== Sights ==
The main landmark of Jesenný is the Chapel of the Exaltation of the Holy Cross. It is an octagonal Baroque structure from 1734.
