= Bozkov =

- Municipality
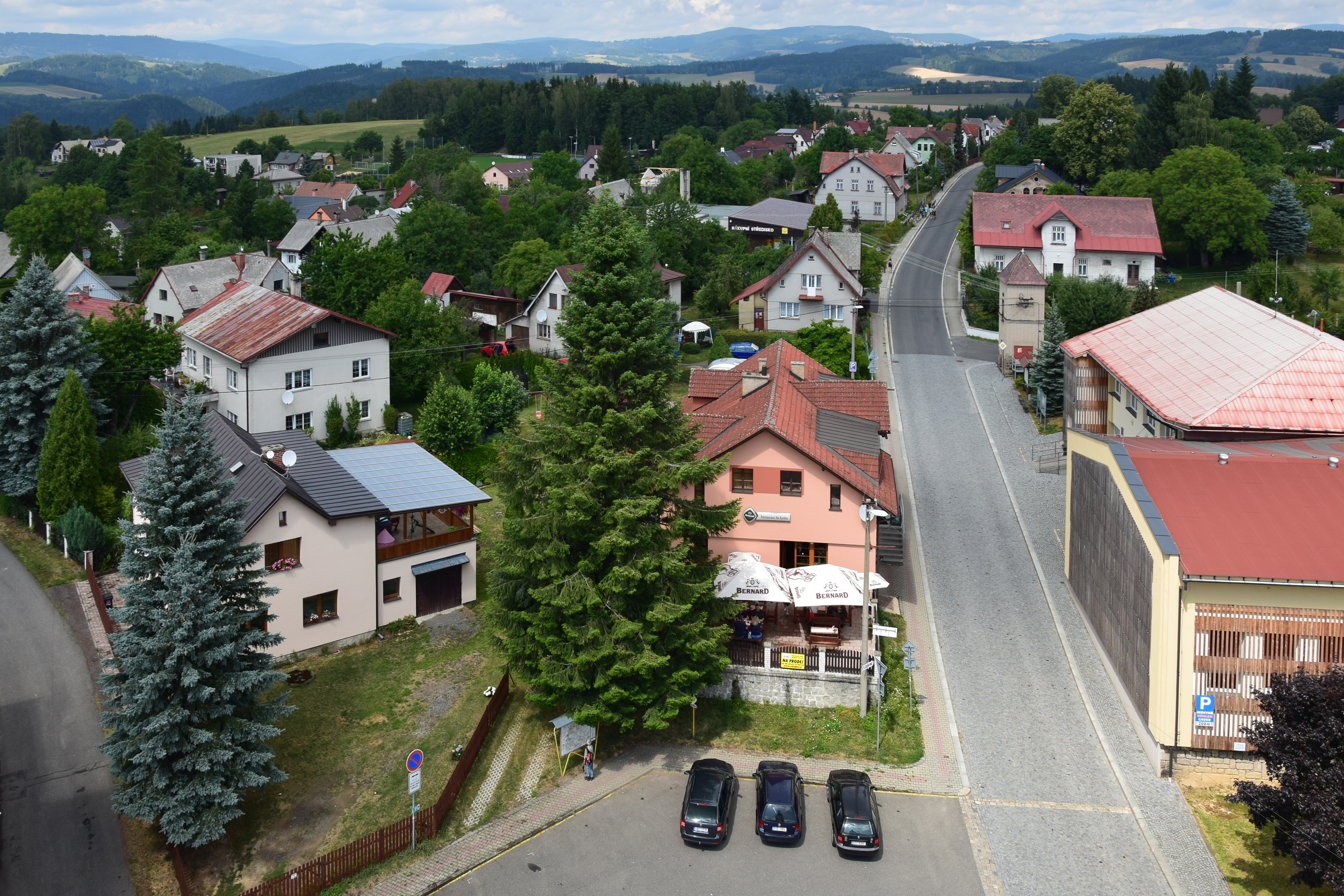
- View from the church

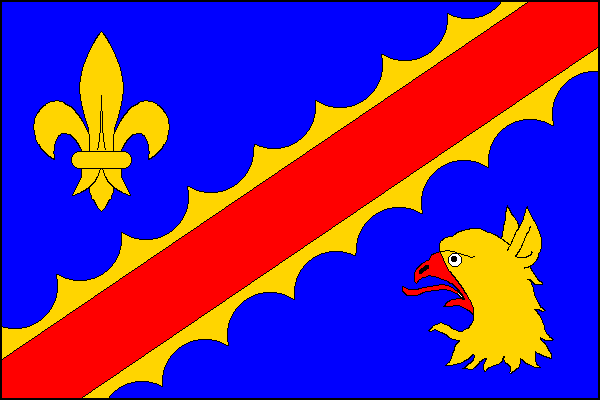
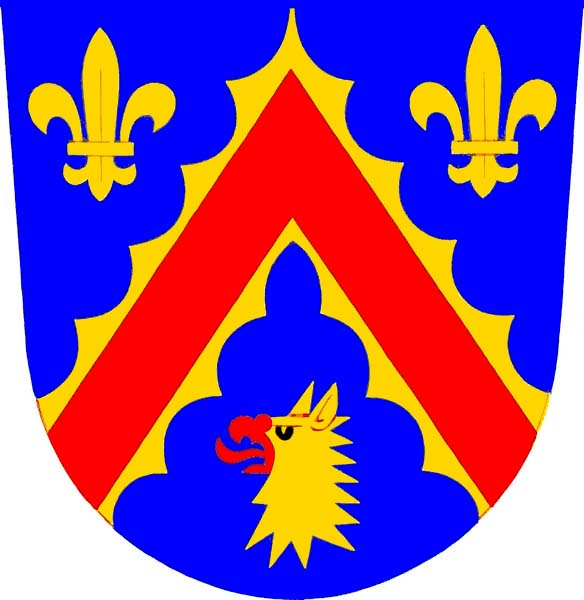
- Flag Coat of arms

- Location in the Czech Republic
- Coordinates: 50°38′24″N 15°20′14″E
- Country: Czech Republic
- Region: Liberec
- District: Semily
- First mentioned: 1356

Area
  - Total: 6.81 km^{2} (2.63 sq mi)
- Elevation: 488 m (1,601 ft)

Population (2026-01-01)
  - Total: 591
  - Density: 86.8/km^{2} (225/sq mi)
- Time zone: UTC+1 (CET)
  - Summer (DST): UTC+2 (CEST)
- Postal code: 512 13
- Website: www.obecbozkov.cz

Bozkov is a municipality and village in Semily District in the Liberec Region of the Czech Republic. It has about 600 inhabitants. It is known for the Bozkov Dolomite Caves.

== Etymology ==
The initial name of the village was most likely Boskov and the name was derived from the personal name Bosek, meaning "Bosek's (court)". Perhaps due to a clerical error, the name was corrupted to Bozkov.

== Geography ==
Bozkov is located about 4 kilometres (2 mi) north of Semily and 22 km (14 mi) southeast of Liberec. It lies in a hilly landscape of the Giant Mountains Foothills. The highest point is the hill Na Končinách at 524 m (1,719 ft) above sea level. The Kamenice River flows along the western municipal border.

== History ==
The first written mention of Bozkov is from 1356. The most notable owners of Bozkov were the Smiřičký of Smiřice family (in the 16th century), Albrecht von Wallenstein (in 1622–1634), the Desfours family (in 1635–1748), and the Caretto-Millesimo family (in 1748–1824). Bozkov was promoted to a market town in 1923, but lost the title after World War II.

== Demographics ==
Historical population

Year	Pop.	±%
1869	1,007	—
1880	1,082	+7.4%
1890	1,147	+6.0%
1900	1,063	−7.3%
1910	1,148	+8.0%

Year	Pop.	±%
1921	1,049	−8.6%
1930	1,036	−1.2%
1950	703	−32.1%
1961	726	+3.3%
1970	651	−10.3%

Year	Pop.	±%
1980	634	−2.6%
1991	566	−10.7%
2001	560	−1.1%
2011	560	+0.0%
2021	574	+2.5%

Source: Censuses

== Transport ==
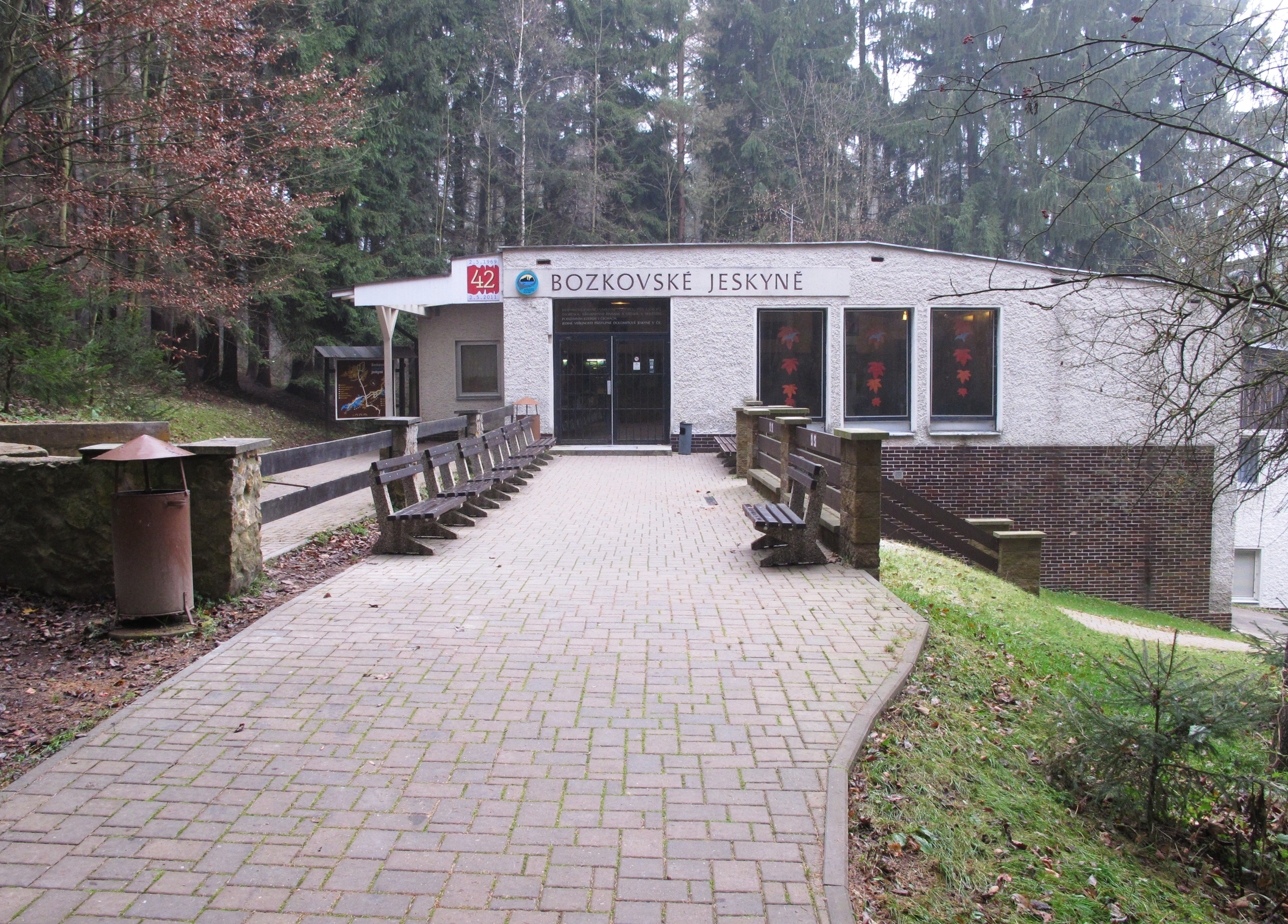
Entrance to the caves

The municipality is briefly crossed by the railway line Železný Brod–Tanvald. However, there is no train station.

== Sights ==
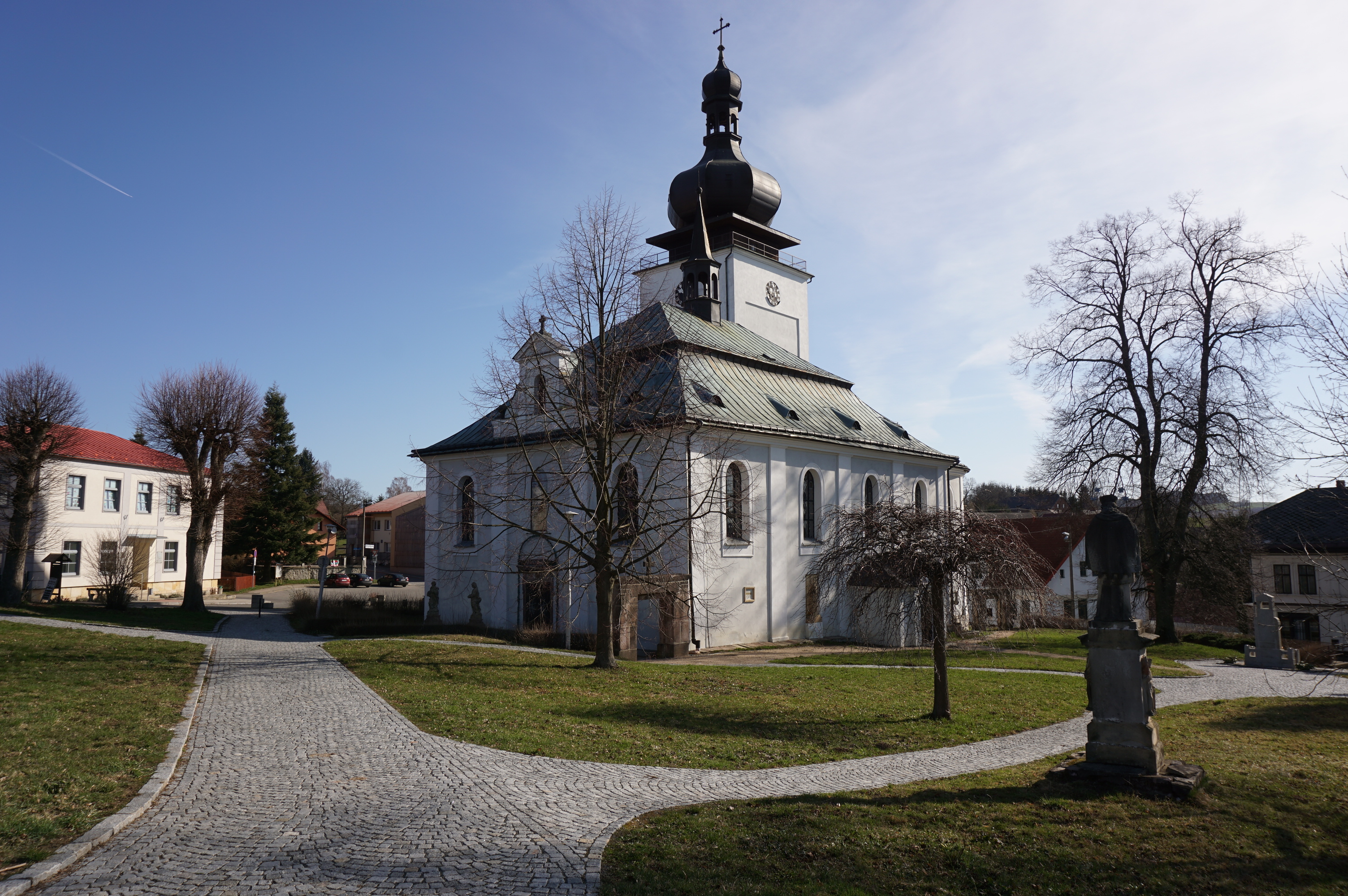
Church of the Visitation of the Virgin Mary

Bozkov is known for the Bozkov Dolomite Caves. They were formed due to a strong corrosive activity of the underground water in the lentil of calcareous metamorphosed dolomites, in some parts strongly silificated. Since 1999, they have been protected as a national nature monument. Their lower parts are permanently flooded and form the largest underground lake in Bohemia. The known spaces are 1,060 metres (3,480 ft) long and are the longest dolomite caves in the country. A 350 metres (1,150 ft) long route is open to the public and annually visited by about 70,000 visitors.

The most valuable building in Bozkov is the Church of the Visitation of the Virgin Mary. It was built in 1697 and contains a rare Gothic sculpture of the Madonna, locally called "Queen of the Mountains". The church tower is 49 metres (161 ft) high and is open to the public as a lookout tower.
