= Fidelio F. Finke =

Bohemian-German composer

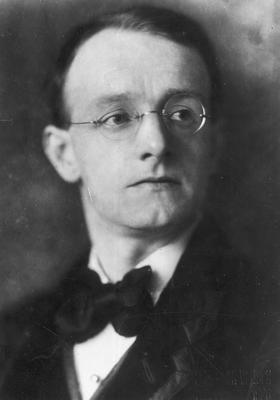
- Born: 22 October 1891; Josefsthal, Austria-Hungary
- Died: 12 June 1968 (aged 76); Dresden, East Germany
- Occupation(s): composer, music teacher, rector
- Era: 20th century

Fidelio Friedrich "Fritz" Finke (22 October 1891 – 12 June 1968) was a Bohemian-German composer.

== Life ==
Finke was born the son of a teacher in 1891 in the north-Bohemian village of Josefstal (modern-day Josefův Důl, Czech Republic). From 1906 to 1908, he attended a teacher's seminar in Reichenberg (now Liberec). He received organ, piano and violin lessons, and from 1908 to 1911, studied at the Prague Conservatory, where he studied piano and composition. From 1911 onward, he worked as a private music teacher and from 1915 as a teacher of musical theory at the Prague Conservatory. In 1920, he moved to the German Academy of Music and Performing Arts in Prague, where he worked as a teacher of musical theory and composition. He became a professor in 1926, and worked as the rector from 1927 to 1945. His students included Friederike Schwarz.

During the German occupation of Czechoslovakia, he composed works expressing sympathy for the Nazis, most notably the hymn O Herzland Böhmen (1942). His opportunistic application for membership within the Nazi party expired in 1942 because of his political unreliability.

After imprisonment and expropriation as a result of the Beneš decrees as well as a suicide attempt in 1945, Finke was brought to Dresden by the Soviet occupation forces via Moscow. There, he founded the State Academy of Music and Dresden Theatre, and was, until 1951, its rector. Until 1958, he was a professor of sound recordings at the Leipzig Academy of Music. His total works comprise about 170 compositions.

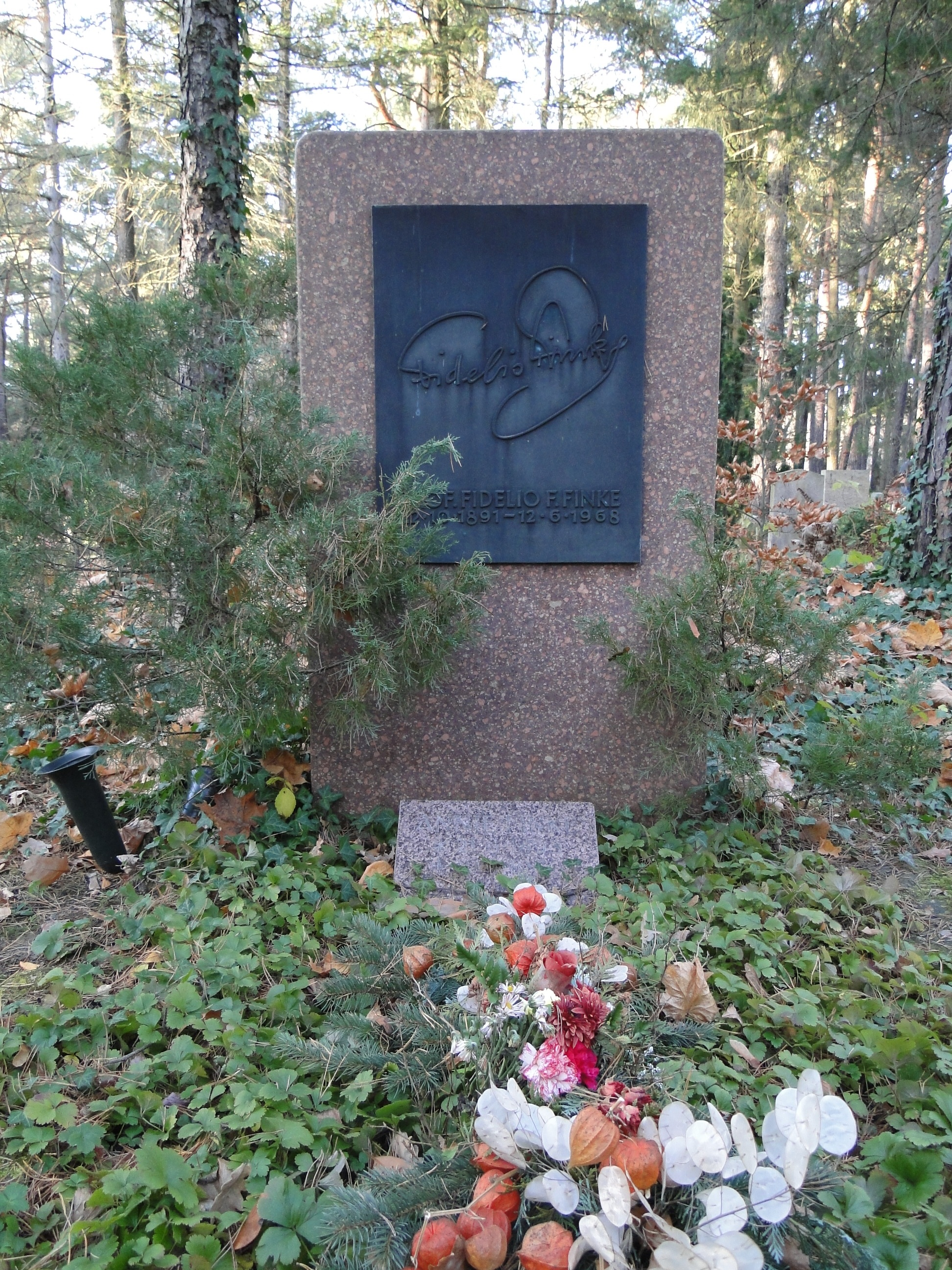
Finke's grave at the Heidefriedhof in Dresden

Finke was a member of the SED from 1946 until his death in 1968 in Dresden. He was buried in Heidenfriedhof Cemetery. His signature graces his gravestone. Finke's estate is preserved by the Academy of Arts in Berlin.

== Selected works ==
=== Stage ===
- Die versunkene Glocke (The Sunken Bell), Opera in 4 acts after the drama by Gerhart Hauptmann (1916–1919); unfinished
- Die Jakobsfahrt, Opera in 3 acts after the legend by Dietzenschmidt (1932–1936); premiere 1936, New German Theatre, Prague)
- Lied der Zeit, Dance Pantomime in 2 parts (premiere 1947 in Buehlau, Dresden)
- Ruth, die Ährenleserin, begegnet Boas, Characteristic Dance for solo dancer and piano (1946–1947)
- Der schlagfertige Liebhaber, Opera buffa in 3 acts after Karl Zuchardt (1950–1954); unfinished (vocal/piano score only)
- Der Zauberfisch, Children's Opera in 2 acts after folk tales by the Brothers Grimm (1956–1959; premiere 1960, State Opera Dresden); libretto by Wilhelm Hübner

=== Orchestral ===
- Schauspielouvertüre (1908)
- Suite for string orchestra (1911)
- Variationen und Fuge for chamber orchestra (1915)
- Pan, Symphony for large orchestra (1919)
- Konzert für Orchester (Concerto for Orchestra) (1932)
- Kleine Festmusik for concert band (1937)
- Acht Bagatellen (8 Bagatelles) (1939)
- Vier Studien (4 Studies) (1943)
- Ciacona (1944)
- Suite No. 2 (1947)
- Suite No. 3 (1949)
- Suite No. 4 for 16 wind instruments and percussion (1953)
- Suite No. 5 Musik für elf Bläser (Music for 11 Winds) (1955)
- Suite No. 6 (1956)
- Symphonische Märsche (Symphonic Marches), Suite No. 7 (1960)
- Suite No. 8 for wind quintet, 2 pianos and string orchestra (1961)
- Divertimento for chamber orchestra (1964)
- Festmusik (1964)

=== Concertante ===
- Concerto for piano and small orchestra (1930)
- Capriccio über ein polnisches Volkslied (Capriccio on a Polish Folk Song) for piano and orchestra (1953)

=== Chamber music ===
- String Quartet No. 1 (1914); dedicated to Arnold Schoenberg
- Piano Trio (1923)
- 8 Musiken for 2 violins and viola (1923)
- Sonata for violin and piano (1924)
- String Quartet No. 2 „Der zerstörte Tasso“ (with soprano solo) (1925)
- Ciacona nach Vitali for violin and piano (1925)
- String Quartet No. 3 (1926, lost)
- Sonata for cello (1926, lost)
- Sonata for flute and piano (1927)
- 100 Stücke (100 Pieces) for recorder solo (1936)
- Sonatina for harp (1945)
- Sonata for horn and piano (1946)
- Sonata for clarinet and piano (1949)
- Sonata for viola and piano (1954)
- Wind Quintet (1955)
- Toccata for accordion (1955)
- String Quartet No. 5 (1963–1964)
- … ismen und … ionen for flute, viola, cello, double bass, piano and harp (1968); movement IV completed by Heinrich Simbriger

=== Piano ===
- Polka groteska
- Sonata in E minor (1903, lost)
- Thema con Variazioni, Op. 9 (before 1908)
- Fantasia auf der Fahrt (Fantasia on the Ride), Op. 12 (1908)
- Intermezzo (1909)
- 4 Klavierstücke (4 Piano Pieces) (1910–11)
- Eine Reiter-Burleske, Symphonic Poem for piano (1913)
- Romantische Suite (Romantic Suite) (1916)
- Gesichten (Visions), 7 Piano Pieces (1921)
- Klaviermusiken für Kinder (Piano Music for Children) (1921)
- 19 kleine Klavierstücke (19 Little Piano Pieces) (1921)
- Marionetten-Musiken, 6 Piano Pieces (1921)
- 10 Kinderstücke (10 Pieces for Children) (1926)
- Suite No. 2 (1928)
- Concertino for 2 pianos (1931)
- Lehrer und Schüler (Teacher and Student), 10 Pieces for piano 4-hands (1935)
- 10 Kinderstücke (10 Piano Pieces) for piano 4-hands (1938)
- Egerländer Sträußlein: Eine Reihe kleiner Stücke für Klavier nach Egerländer Volkslieder (Egerland Bouquet: Series of Little Piano Pieces after Egerland Folk Songs) (1939)
- Tänze aus dem Isergebirge (Dances from the Jizera Mountains) for piano 4-hands (1940)
- Sonatina (1945)
- Klavierstücke nach slawischen Volksliedern (Piano Pieces after Slavic Folk Songs) (1952)
- Drei Klaviersätze nach deutschen Volksliedern (3 Movements for Piano after German Folk Songs) (1954)

=== Organ ===
- Fantasie, Variationen und Doppelfuge über den Choral „Aus tiefer Not“ (1928)
- Toccate und Fuge (1928)
- Sieben Choralvorspiele (7 Chorale Preludes) (1928)
- Suite für Orgel (1930)

=== Choral ===
- Trinklied (Drinking Song) for mixed chorus (1908); words by Gotthold Ephraim Lessing
- Es fuhr eine Fischerin for female chorus and piano (1912); words from Des Knaben Wunderhorn
- 7 Frauenchöre (7 Female Choruses) (1914); words from folk poetry and by Eduard Mörike, Clemens Brentano
- Mein Trinklied for 3 male voices, male chorus and wind orchestra (1918)
- Weihnachtskantilene for mixed chorus (1933); words by Matthias Claudius
- Der große und der kleine Hund for mixed chorus; words by Matthias Claudius
- Sechs vierstimmige Kanons (6 Four-Voice Canons) (1936); words by Wilhelm Busch
- Chor der Toten for mixed chorus (1938); words by Conrad Ferdinand Meyer
- Wir tragen ein Licht for mixed chorus (1938); words by Franz Höller
- Deutsche Kantate (German Cantata) for soprano, baritone, mixed chorus, boys chorus, orchestra and organ (1940); words by Franz Höller
- Weihnachtslied (Christmas Song) for mixed chorus (1940)
- O Herzland Böhmens for mixed chorus, organ and brass (1942)
- 3 Kanons (2 Canons) for mixed chorus (1946); words by Emanuel Geibel, Wilhelm Busch, Ludwig Christoph Hölty
- 2 russische Volkslieder (2 Russian Folk Songs) for female chorus and piano (1946)
- Weihnachts-Kantilene, Little Cantata for children's or female chorus with optional violin, cello and organ (or piano) (1948); words by Matthias Claudius
- Das Göttliche Edel sei der Mensch for mixed chorus (1949); words by Johann Wolfgang von Goethe
- Freiheit und Friede, Cantata for mixed chorus (1953); words by Bertolt Brecht
- Aufbaulied for mixed chorus with instrumental accompaniment (1953)
- Naturtrieb wie die goldnen Bienlein schweben for mixed chorus (published 1953)
- Erziehung durch Natur ich hör das süße Lallen for mixed chorus (published 1953)
- Die Zeit so ist nun mal die Zeit for female chorus (published 1953)
- Glaubensbekenntnis (Faith), Cantata in One Movement for mixed chorus (published 1958); words by Christo Boteff
- Bauernballade for mixed chorus (1961); words by Johannes Robert Becher
- Wir, Volk der schaffenden Hände, Three-voice canon (1962)

=== Vocal ===
- 3 frühe Lieder (3 Early Songs) (1915)
- Frühling (Spring) (1912)
- Abschied, Lyric Scene after Franz Werfel for soprano, tenor and orchestra (1917)
- Fallender Schnee (1917)
- 3 Lieder (1918)
- Kleinseitner Adagio (1928)
- 3 Lieder (1929); words by Rainer Maria Rilke
- Drei Lieder nach Carl Bayer for voice and piano (published 1931)
- Märlein (1937); words by Hans Watzlik
- Frau Nachtigal, Madrigal for soprano, alto, tenor, high and low bass (1937); words from Des Knaben Wunderhorn
- Sudetendeutsche Volkslieder (1939)
- Lob des Sommers, 4 Songs for voice and piano (1940); words by Rainer Maria Rilke
- 4 Lieder (1940–1942); words by Emil Merker
- Einmal for bass (or alto) and piano (1943); words by Franz Brendal
- Beginn des Endes (1945); words by Theodor Storm
- Schein und Sein, 10 Songs for voice and piano (1948); words by Wilhelm Busch
- Drei Terzette nach slawischen Volksliedern (3 Trios after Slavic Folk Songs) for soprano, alto, tenor and piano (published 1953)
- Eros, Cantata for soprano, tenor and orchestra (1962)
- Der Apfelbaum am Wegrand (The Apple Tree by the Wayside) for voice and piano (1965); words by Mihai Beniuc
- Epilog (1966); words by Bertold Brecht
- Cantata piccola for voice and piano (1966); words by Wilhelm Busch

== Honors, memberships ==
- 1910 Brahms-Preis at the Vienna Tonkünstlervereins
- 1919 Chorpreis des Weltmusikbundes in Vienna
- 1928 and 1937 Czechoslovak State Prize for music
- 1956 National Prize of the German Democratic Republic
- Membership at the Academy of Arts, Berlin
- Honorary sponsor at the music academies of Dresden and Leipzig
- 1961 Bronze Patriotic Order of Merit

== Literature ==
- Dieter Härtwig: Fidelio F. Finke: Leben und Werk. Habilitationsschrift, masch. vervielf. Leipzig 1970. Deutsche Bibliothek Frankfurt am Main U.70.3699
- Fred K. Prieberg: Handbuch Deutsche Musiker 1933–1945, CD-Rom-Lexikon, Kiel 2004, p. 1565–1569.
- Wilhelm Hübner: Fidelio F. Finke – Gedanken über meinen Lehrer, in: Dresden und die avancierte Musik im 20. Jahrhundert. Teil II: 1933-1966, edited by Matthias Herrmann and Hanns-Werner Heister, Laaber 2002, p. 397–404 (Musik in Dresden 5), ISBN 3-89007-510-X

== See also ==
- List of classical composers in the GDR
