= Josefův Důl (Jablonec nad Nisou District) =

- Municipality
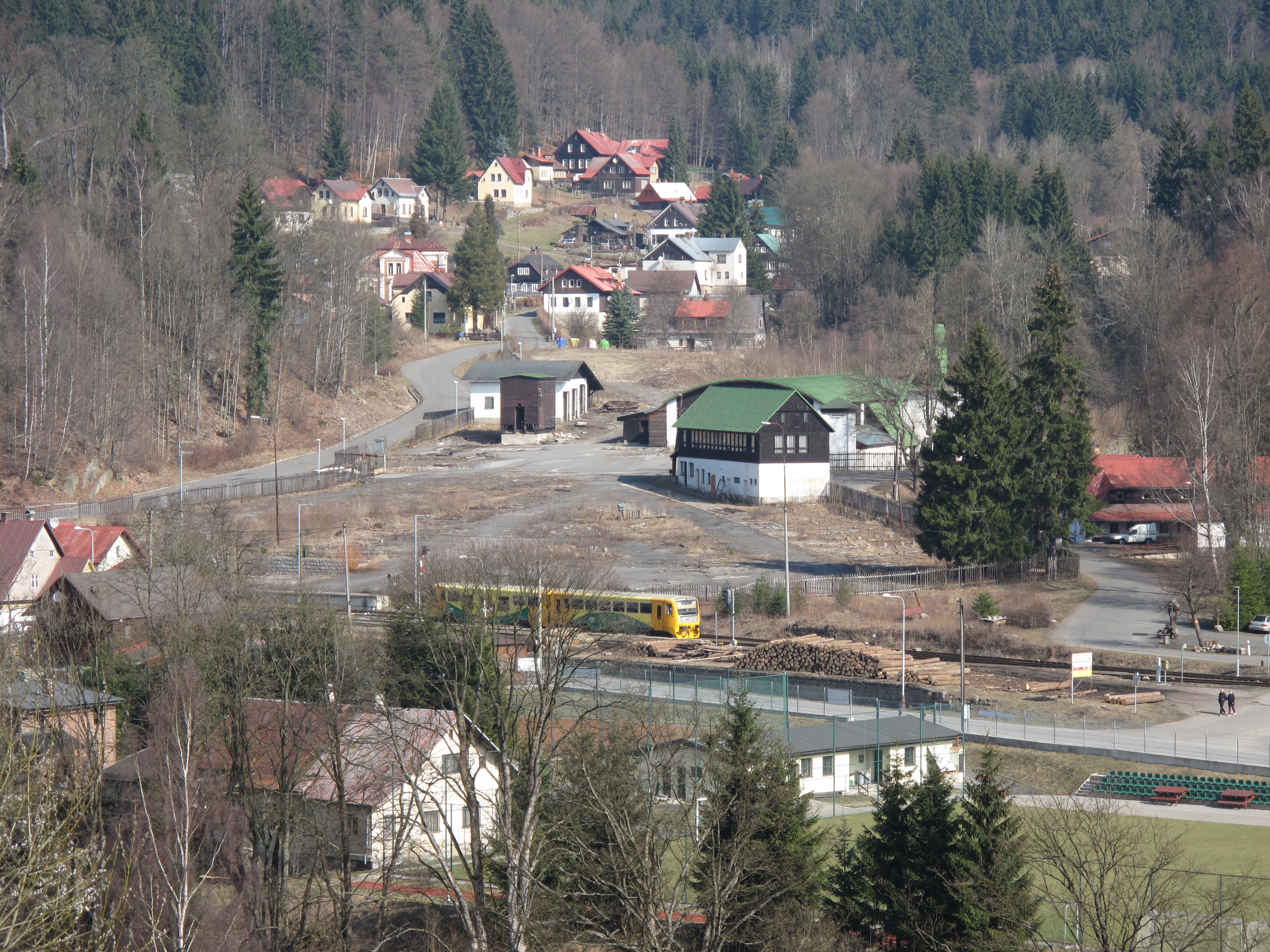
- View of Josefův Důl

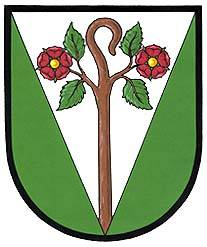
- Flag Coat of arms

- Location in the Czech Republic
- Coordinates: 50°46′55″N 15°13′54″E
- Country: Czech Republic
- Region: Liberec
- District: Jablonec nad Nisou
- Founded: 1701

Area
  - Total: 22.01 km^{2} (8.50 sq mi)
- Elevation: 625 m (2,051 ft)

Population (2026-01-01)
  - Total: 860
  - Density: 39/km^{2} (100/sq mi)
- Time zone: UTC+1 (CET)
  - Summer (DST): UTC+2 (CEST)
- Postal code: 468 44
- Website: josefuvdul.eu

Josefův Důl (German: Josefsthal) is a municipality and village in Jablonec nad Nisou District in the Liberec Region of the Czech Republic. It has about 900 inhabitants.

== Administrative division ==
Josefův Důl consists of four municipal parts (in brackets population according to the 2021 census):

- Josefův Důl (419)
- Antonínov (190)
- Dolní Maxov (246)
- Karlov (44)

== Etymology ==
The name Josefův Důl means "Josef's valley" in Czech. Josefův Důl and Karlov were named after Count Karl Josef Desfours-Walderode.

== Geography ==
Josefův Důl is located about 7 kilometres (4 mi) northeast of Jablonec nad Nisou and 11 km (7 mi) east of Liberec. It lies in the southeastern part of the Jizera Mountains and in the Jizerské hory Protected Landscape Area. The highest point is at 995 m (3,264 ft) above sea level.

The village is situated in the valley of the Kamenice River. Other watercourses in the municipality include the Jedlová Stream, which flows through the Jedlový důl nature reserve, and the streams Červený potok, Jelení potok, Pekelný potok and Hluboký potok. Due to the rugged terrain there are multiple waterfalls in the area. Josefův Důl Reservoir, located in the northwestern part of the municipal territory, was built on the Kamenice in 1976–1982.

== History ==
Around 1690, Count Maximilian II Desfours-Walderode settled the area with German immigrants. The village of Karlov was founded in 1700 and Josefův Důl was founded in 1701, and both villages were named after Maximilian's newborn son, Karl Josef Desfours-Walderode. Dolní Maxov was founded in 1670 and named after Albrecht Maximilian Desfours-Walderode. The livelihood of the inhabitants of the villages was glassmaking, grinding and herding. The first glassworks was built in the 17th century.

The Munich Agreement permitted Nazi Germany to annex the area in 1938 and administer it as part of Reichsgau Sudetenland. Shortly thereafter Karlov was dissolved becoming Horní Maxov and Antonínov. Josefův Důl and Dolní Maxov formed a new municipality named Josefodol. Following World War II, in 1945, the municipality was returned to Czechoslovakia and the German inhabitants were expelled under the terms of Beneš decrees.

== Demographics ==
Historical population

Year	Pop.	±%
1869	3,600	—
1880	4,126	+14.6%
1890	5,032	+22.0%
1900	5,386	+7.0%
1910	5,431	+0.8%

Year	Pop.	±%
1921	4,423	−18.6%
1930	4,320	−2.3%
1950	1,956	−54.7%
1961	1,590	−18.7%
1970	1,437	−9.6%

Year	Pop.	±%
1980	1,319	−8.2%
1991	1,071	−18.8%
2001	990	−7.6%
2011	904	−8.7%
2021	899	−0.6%

Source: Censuses

== Transport ==
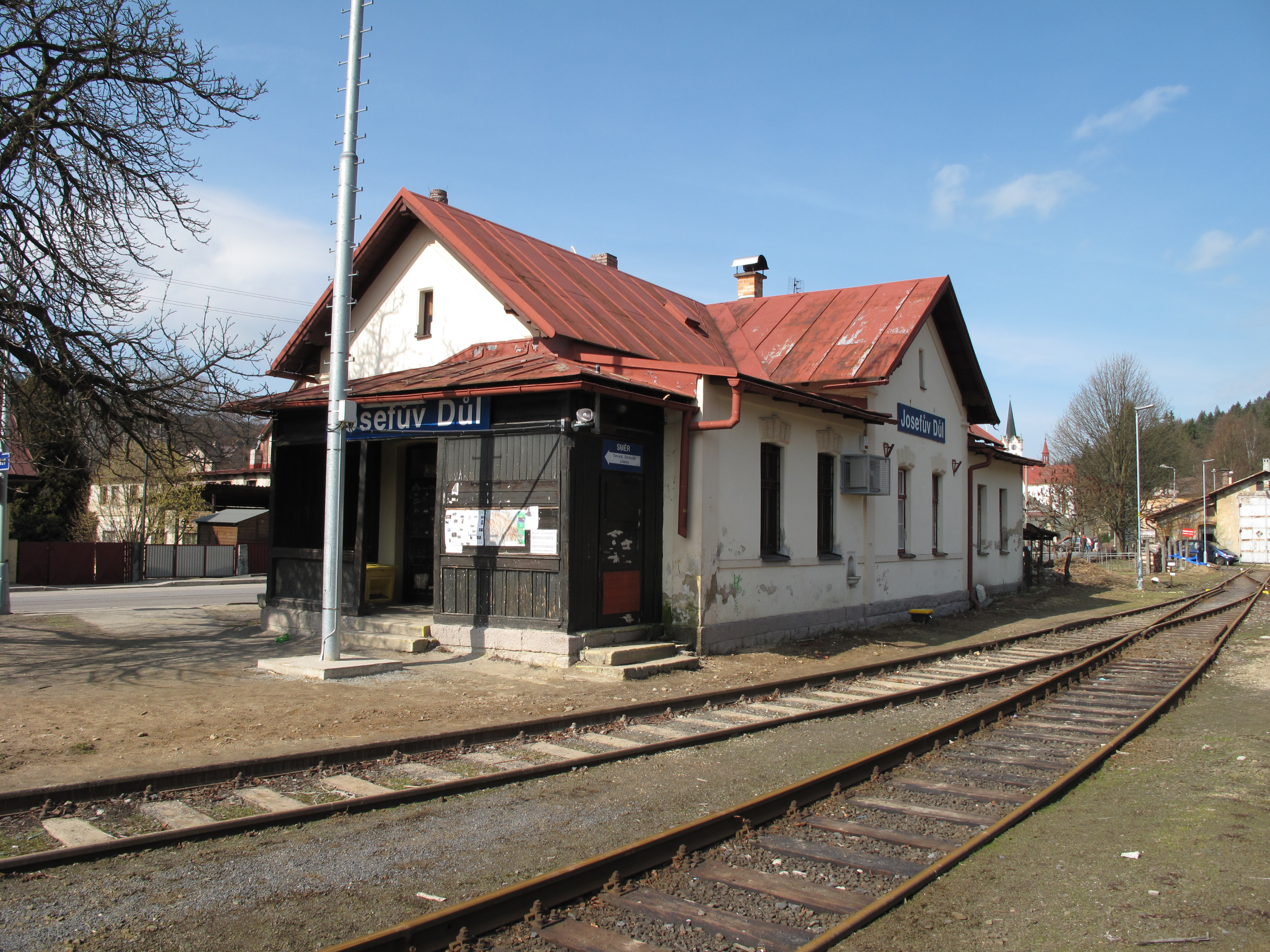
Train station

The railway line Josefův Důl–Smržovka starts here.

== Sport ==
Known as "the gateway to Jizera Mountains", Josefův Důl is a popular destination for skiers, hikers and cyclists. There is a small ski resort.

== Sights ==
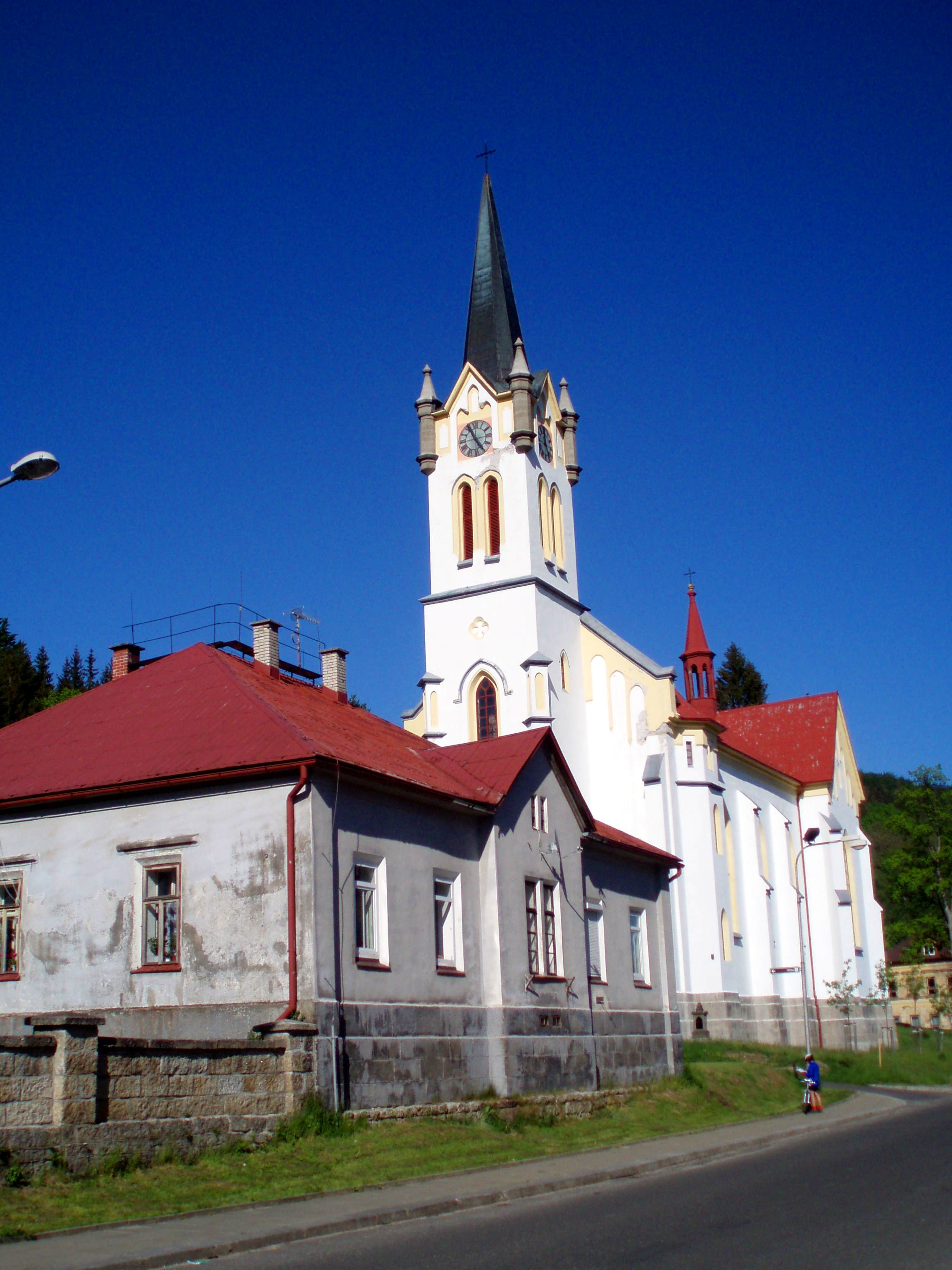
Church of the Transfiguration of Christ

The main landmark of Josefův Důl is the Church of the Transfiguration of Christ with a 45 metres (148 ft) high tower. It was built in the pseudo-Gothic style in 1862–1865. The interior fittings house three valuable altar paintings by Wilhelm Kandler.

The Chapel of the Visitation of the Virgin Mary in Karlov was built in the Baroque style in 1803 and rebuilt into its current form in 1865. It replaced an old wooden chapel from 1762.

== Notable people ==
- Gustav Leutelt (1860–1947), poet and writer
- Fidelio F. Finke (1891–1968), composer
