= Kamenice (Jizera) =

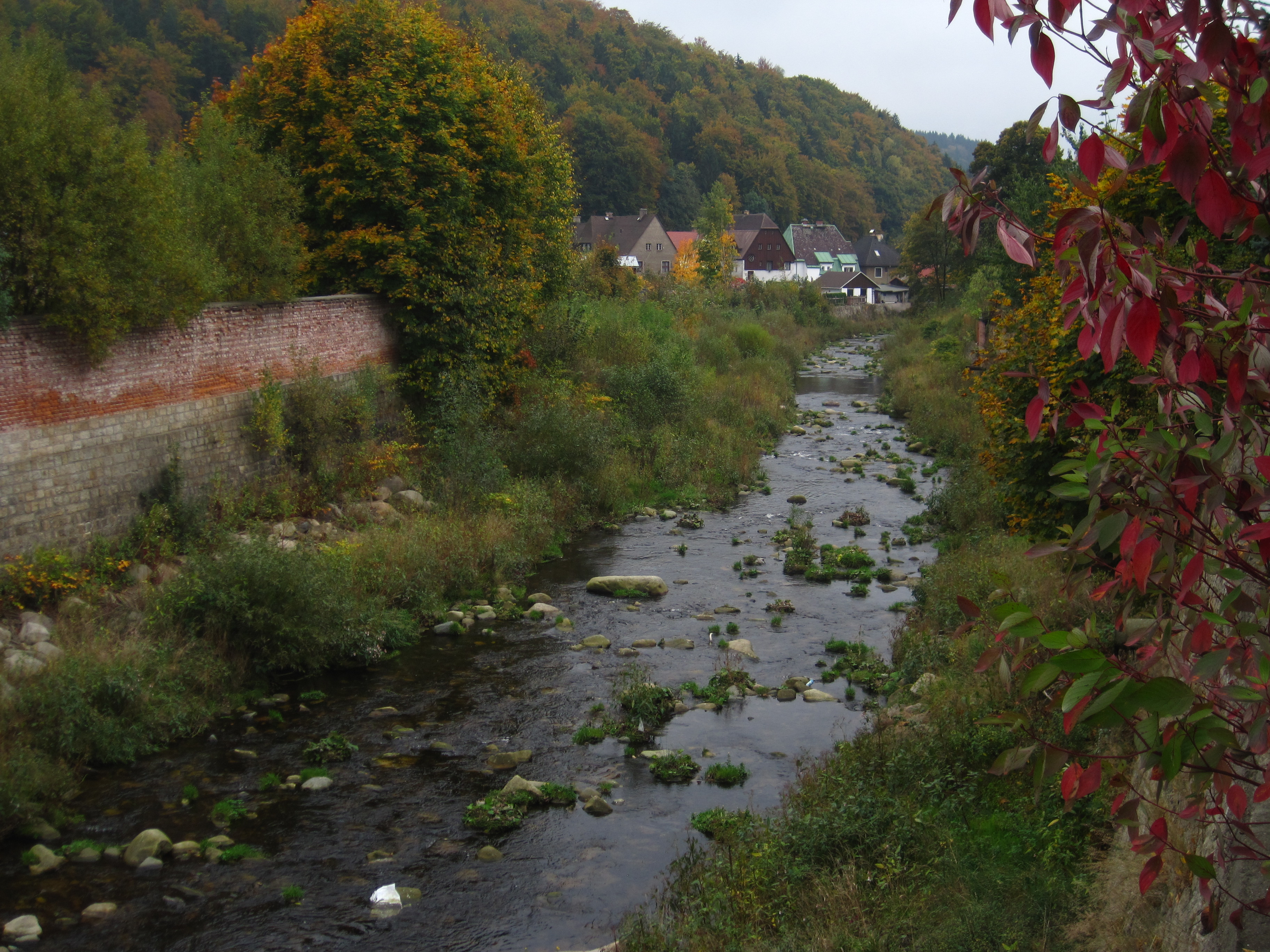
- The Kamenice in Velké Hamry

Location
- Country: Czech Republic
- Region: Liberec

Physical characteristics
- Source
  - location: Bedřichov, Jizera Mountains
  - coordinates: 50°49′59″N 15°12′23″E
  - elevation: 1,007 m (3,304 ft)
- Mouth
  - location: Jizera
  - coordinates: 50°38′2″N 15°17′59″E
  - elevation: 283 m (928 ft)
- Length: 36.9 km (22.9 mi)
- Basin size: 218.6 km^{2} (84.4 sq mi)
- Discharge
  - average: 4.65 m^{3}/s (164 cu ft/s) near estuary

Basin features
- Progression: Jizera→ Elbe→ North Sea

The Kamenice (German: Kamnitz) is a river in the Czech Republic, a right tributary of the Jizera River. It flows through the Liberec Region. It is 36.9 km (22.9 mi) long. The Josefův Důl Reservoir is built on the river.

== Etymology ==
Kamenice is a common Czech toponym. The name is derived from the Czech word kamenný, i.e. 'stony'. The river is named after the character of the river bed. The river is sometimes called Tanvaldská Kamenice to distinguish it from the eponymous rivers in the country.

== Characteristic ==
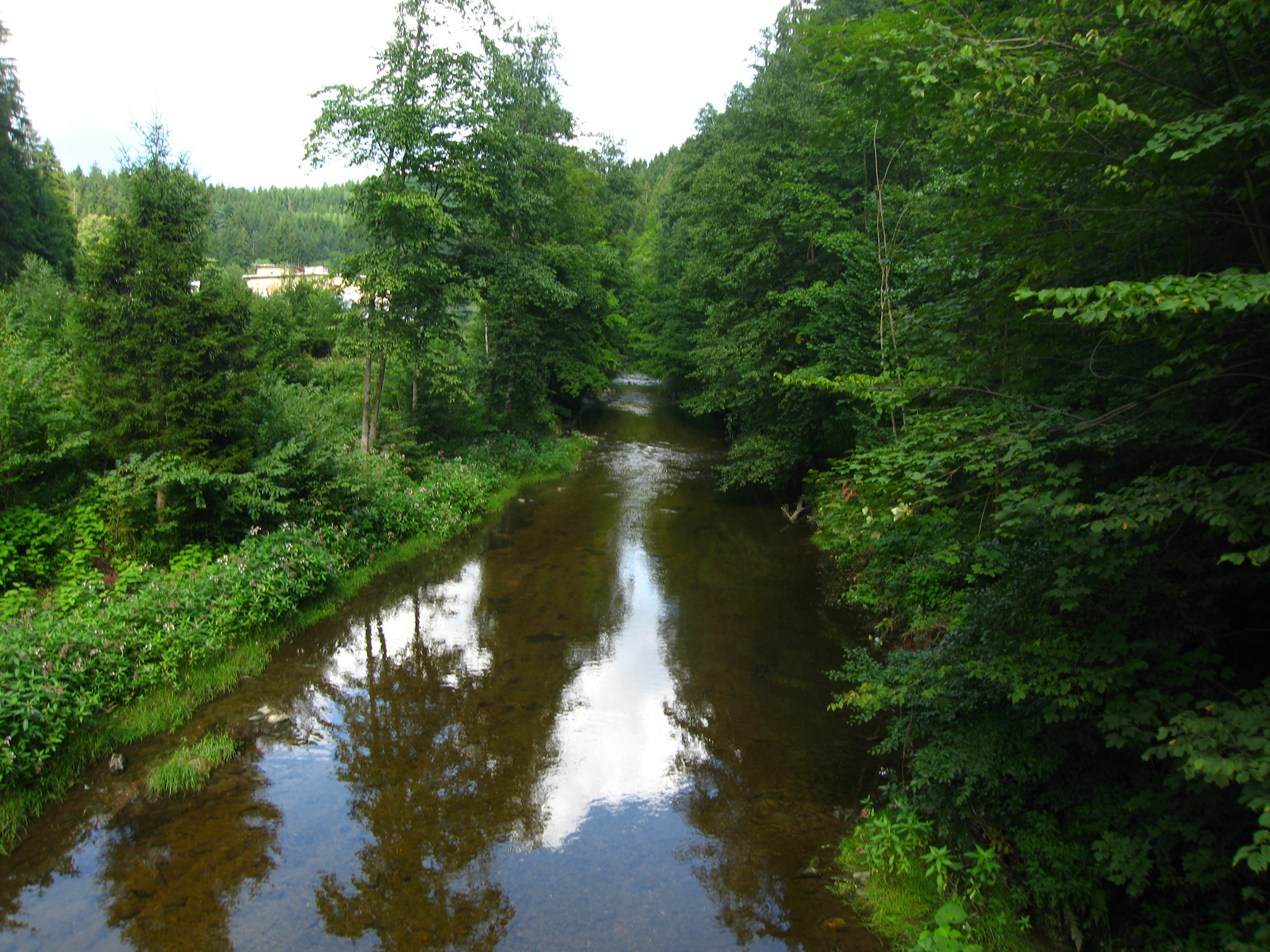
The Kamenice near Jesenný

The Kamenice originates in the territory of Bedřichov in the Jizera Mountains at an elevation of 1,007 m (3,304 ft) and flows to Semily-Spálov, where it enters the Jizera River at an elevation of 283 m (928 ft). It is 36.9 km (22.9 mi) long. Its drainage basin has an area of 218.6 km^{2} (84.4 sq mi).

The longest tributaries of the Kamenice are:

Tributary	Length (km)	River km	Side
Desná	13.6	15.9	left
Vošmenda	12.6	1.2	left
Zlatník	8.4	8.5	left
Smržovský potok	7.7	18.6	right

== Course ==
The river flows through the municipal territories of Bedřichov, Josefův Důl, Janov nad Nisou, Albrechtice v Jizerských horách, Tanvald, Jiřetín pod Bukovou, Smržovka, Velké Hamry, Plavy, Zlatá Olešnice, Držkov, Vlastiboř, Jesenný, Bozkov, Železný Brod and Semily.

== Bodies of water ==
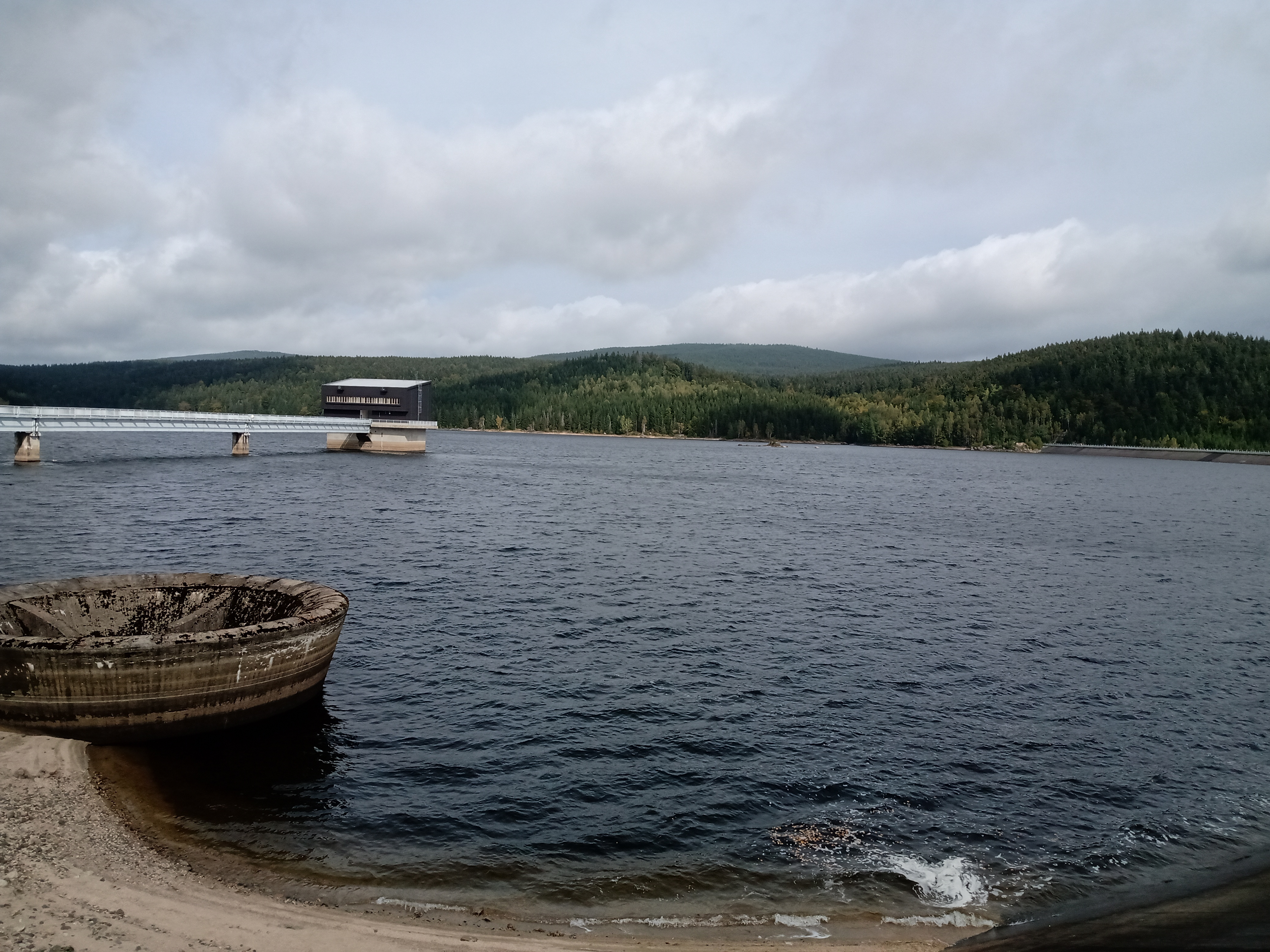
Josefův Důl Reservoir

The Josefův Důl Reservoir was built on the upper course of the Kamenice in 1976–1982. Its main purpose is the supply of drinking water.

== Tourism ==
The Kamenice is suitable for river tourism and is among the most popular wild rivers in the Czech Republic. However, the river is navigable only in spring or after heavy rains.

== See also ==
- List of rivers of the Czech Republic
