= Friederike Schwarz =

Czech composer (1910–1945)

- Born: 17 June 1894; Prague, Czechoslovakia
- Died: 30 August 1945 (aged 51); Prague, Czechoslovakia
- Occupations: Musicologist, composer, pianist, educator
- Known for: Work on Czech music, piano compositions

Friederike Schwarz (15 January 1910 – 5 May 1945) was a Czech composer, educator, pianist and writer. She, together with her sister, committed suicide during the Prague uprising. She sometimes published under the pseudonym rz.

== Biography ==
Schwarz was born in Prague to a family of modest means. Her musical talent came to the attention of composer Fidelio Finke, director of the German Academy of Music and Performing Arts, who helped Schwarz get scholarships to study piano and composition at the Academy. She graduated in 1931 and began writing for the music journal Der Auftakt, the official publication of the Musikpädagogischer Verband (Music Education Association) in Prague. She wrote about activities at the German Academy and other facets of German musical life in Prague, under her own name and under the pseudonym rz.

Schwarz was mentored by Erich Steinhard, the editor of Der Auftakt, who favorably reviewed her compositions. During the 1930s, she succeeded him as the Prague correspondent for the Berlin publication Die Musik.

Schwarz's Concerto for Piano and Chamber Orchestra won a prize from the Prague Literary-Artistic Society. Her chamber music compositions were favorably reviewed in the Prager Tagblatt. She continued to write and teach piano and music theory until her death.

== Work ==
Schwarz's music is published by Laurentius Musikverlag. Her compositions include:

Chamber

- Quintet (string quartet and clarinet)
- Sonata (violin and piano)
- Three Pieces (cello and piano)

Orchestra

- Concerto for Piano and Chamber Orchestra

Piano

- Perpetuum Mobile
- Piano Trio (probably violin, cello and piano)
- Sonata
- Suite

Vocal

- songs
