= Hans-Heinz Dräger =

German-American musicologist

Hans-Heinz Dräger (6 December 1909 – 9 November 1968), complete name Hans-Heinz Gerhard Kurt Dräger, was a German-American musicologist. He died in November 1968 at age 58.

== Life and career ==
Born in Stralsund, Dräger attended the secondary school in Stralsund from 1920 to 1931. From 1931 to 1937, he studied musicology at the Humboldt-Universität zu Berlin with Friedrich Blume, Curt Sachs, Arnold Schering, Georg Schünemann and Erich Schumann. In addition, he studied art history with Albert Erich Brinckmann and Wilhelm Pinder, philosophy with Max Dessoir and Nicolai Hartmann and German literature with Herrmann.

After obtaining his doctorate in 1937, he was offered a post as an assistant at the State Institute for Music Research. In 1938, he became assistant to the director of the Berlin Musical Instrument Museum. In 1939, he was appointed acting director of the museum.

After the Second World War, he went to the University of Kiel where he was habilitated in 1946. In 1947, he was appointed professor at the University of Greifswald, after which he taught at the University of Rostock until 1949. Afterwards he was professor at the Humboldt University of Berlin until 1953. Then he left the German Democratic Republic and was professor at the Free University of Berlin until 1961. In 1955, he was employed by RIAS as a music specialist and expert in musicology. From September 1955 to May 1956, he was a visiting professor at Stanford University as part of the Fulbright Program. In 1961, he accepted a visiting professorship at the University of Texas at Austin. There he took over the chair for systematic musicology in 1963.

In 1966, Draeger received the Citizenship of the United States. He was chairman of the Texan section of the American Musicological Society.

Draeger's main subject was description and musical instrument classification. For this purpose, he developed a set of tables in his habilitation thesis, in which all musical instruments were to be sorted according to a constant sequence of questions.

Dräger died in Austin (Texas) at age 58.

== Work ==
- Die Entwicklung des Streichbogens und seine Anwendung in Europa. (Promotion) Bärenreiter, Kassel 1937
- Article Amati, Blasinstrumentenbau, Bogen, Buhle, Casals, Dräger, Drehleier, Dynamik, Fidel, Gagliano Familie, Gasparo da Salò, Geige, Familie Grancino, Groblicz, Hackbrett, Instrumentenkunde, Janko, Kontrabaß, Mersenne, Monochord, Musette, Musik-Ästhetik A, Psalterium A and Tourte in Friedrich Blume (ed.): Die Musik in Geschichte und Gegenwart. Bärenreiter, Kassel 1949–1966
- Prinzip einer Systematik der Musikinstrumente. Bärenreiter, Kassel 1948

== Literature ==
- Dräger, Hans-Heinz. In Deutsche Biographische Enzyklopädie. K. G. Saur, Berlin, Boston 2011. (Verlag Walter de Gruyter Online, 9 August 2015).
- Michael S. Morawski: Draeger, Hans-Heinz. In Laurie E. Jasinski (ed.): Handbook of Texas Music. Texas A&M University Press, 2012, ISBN 9780876112977, (Google Books).
- University of Texas (Publ.): In memoriam Hans-Heinz Draeger. Austin 1968, (Online, PDF).
