= Wolfgang Hohensee =

German composer (1927–2018)

Wolfgang Hohensee (3 January 1927 – 25 March 2018) was a German classical composer.

== Biography ==
Wolfgang Hohensee was born in Berlin on 3 January 1927. From 1945 to 1949 he studied School Music at the Academy of Music in Berlin-Charlottenburg and then Composition with Paul Höffer and Konrad Friedrich Noetel. Thereafter he began studying musicology with Walther Vetter, Ernst Hermann Meyer and Hans-Heinz Dräger in Berlin and with Thrasybulos Georgiades in Heidelberg. From 1949 to 1951 he attended the master classes in composition of Hanns Eisler and Leo Spies at the Academy of Arts in Berlin. After working briefly for a radio station, he worked as a conductor, choral conductor and musical dramaturg from 1951 to 1957, inter alia at the German National Theatre (Weimar). Starting in 1955 he taught at the Academy of Music "Hanns Eisler", from 1962 as a docent for texture and since 1969 as a professor for composition. He received the Art Prize of the German Democratic Republic (1962 and 1970) as well as the Art Prize of the Free German Trade Union Federation (1970). He died on 25 March 2018, at the age of 91.
