= Tanvald =

- Town
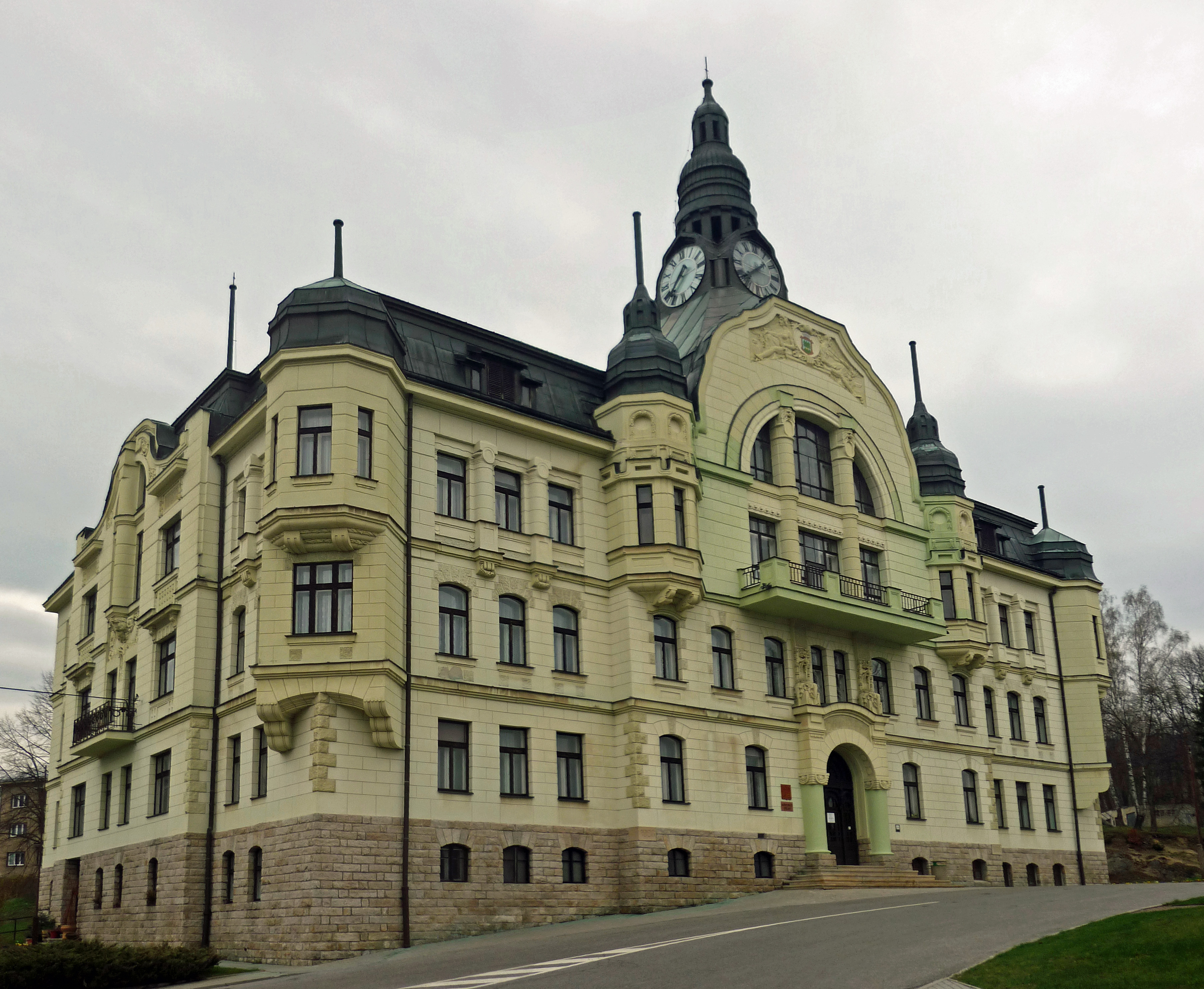
- Town hall

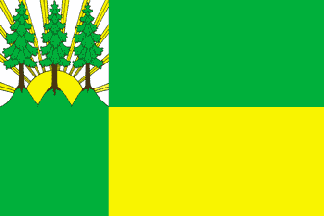
- Flag Coat of arms

- Location in the Czech Republic
- Coordinates: 50°44′15″N 15°18′21″E
- Country: Czech Republic
- Region: Liberec
- District: Jablonec nad Nisou
- First mentioned: 1586

Government
  - Mayor: Jan Prašivka

Area
  - Total: 12.45 km^{2} (4.81 sq mi)
- Elevation: 455 m (1,493 ft)

Population (2026-01-01)
  - Total: 5,941
  - Density: 477.2/km^{2} (1,236/sq mi)
- Time zone: UTC+1 (CET)
  - Summer (DST): UTC+2 (CEST)
- Postal code: 468 41
- Website: www.tanvald.cz

Tanvald (Czech pronunciation: [ˈtanvalt]; German: Tannwald) is a town in Jablonec nad Nisou District in the Liberec Region of the Czech Republic. It has about 5,900 inhabitants. The town is located in the Jizera Mountains, at the confluence of the rivers Kamenice and Desná.

Tanvald was founded as a lumberjack settlement in the 16th century and became a town in 1925.

== Administrative division ==
Tanvald consists of three municipal parts (in brackets population according to the 2021 census):

- Tanvald (3,982)
- Šumburk nad Desnou (1,592)
- Žďár (251)

== Etymology ==
The original German name Tannwald literally means 'fir forest'. The Czech name was created by transcription of the German name.

== Geography ==
Tanvald is located about 9 km (6 mi) east of Jablonec nad Nisou. It lies in the Jizera Mountains. The highest point is the mountain Špičák at 810 m (2,660 ft) above sea level. The town is situated at the confluence of the rivers Kamenice, which flows along the southern municipal border, and Desná, which flows across the eastern part of the municipal territory.

== History ==
The first written mention of Tanvald is from 1586, when it was described as a lumberjack settlement. In 1895, the village was promoted to a market town and in 1905 to a town. In 1848, Žďár was joined to Tanvald.

The first written mention of Šumburk nad Desnou is from the 17th century, it was probably founded between 1565 and 1581. In 1906, it was promoted to a market town and in 1925 to a town. In 1942, Tanvald and Šumburk nad Desnou were merged into one municipality.

From 1938 to 1945, Tanvald was annexed by Nazi Germany and administered as part of the Reichsgau Sudetenland. The majority German population was expelled in 1945. The town was then resettled with Czechs.

== Demographics ==
Historical population

Year	Pop.	±%
1869	4,177	—
1880	4,824	+15.5%
1890	6,075	+25.9%
1900	6,747	+11.1%
1910	7,830	+16.1%

Year	Pop.	±%
1921	6,902	−11.9%
1930	7,799	+13.0%
1950	5,240	−32.8%
1961	5,114	−2.4%
1970	6,168	+20.6%

Year	Pop.	±%
1980	7,592	+23.1%
1991	7,055	−7.1%
2001	7,001	−0.8%
2011	6,435	−8.1%
2021	5,825	−9.5%

Source: Censuses

== Transport ==
Tanvald is located on the railway lines Prague–Tanvald and Liberec–Szklarska Poręba. Historic trains also run on the Tanvald–Harrachov cog railway.

== Sport ==
On the mountain Špičák is a ski resort.

== Sights ==
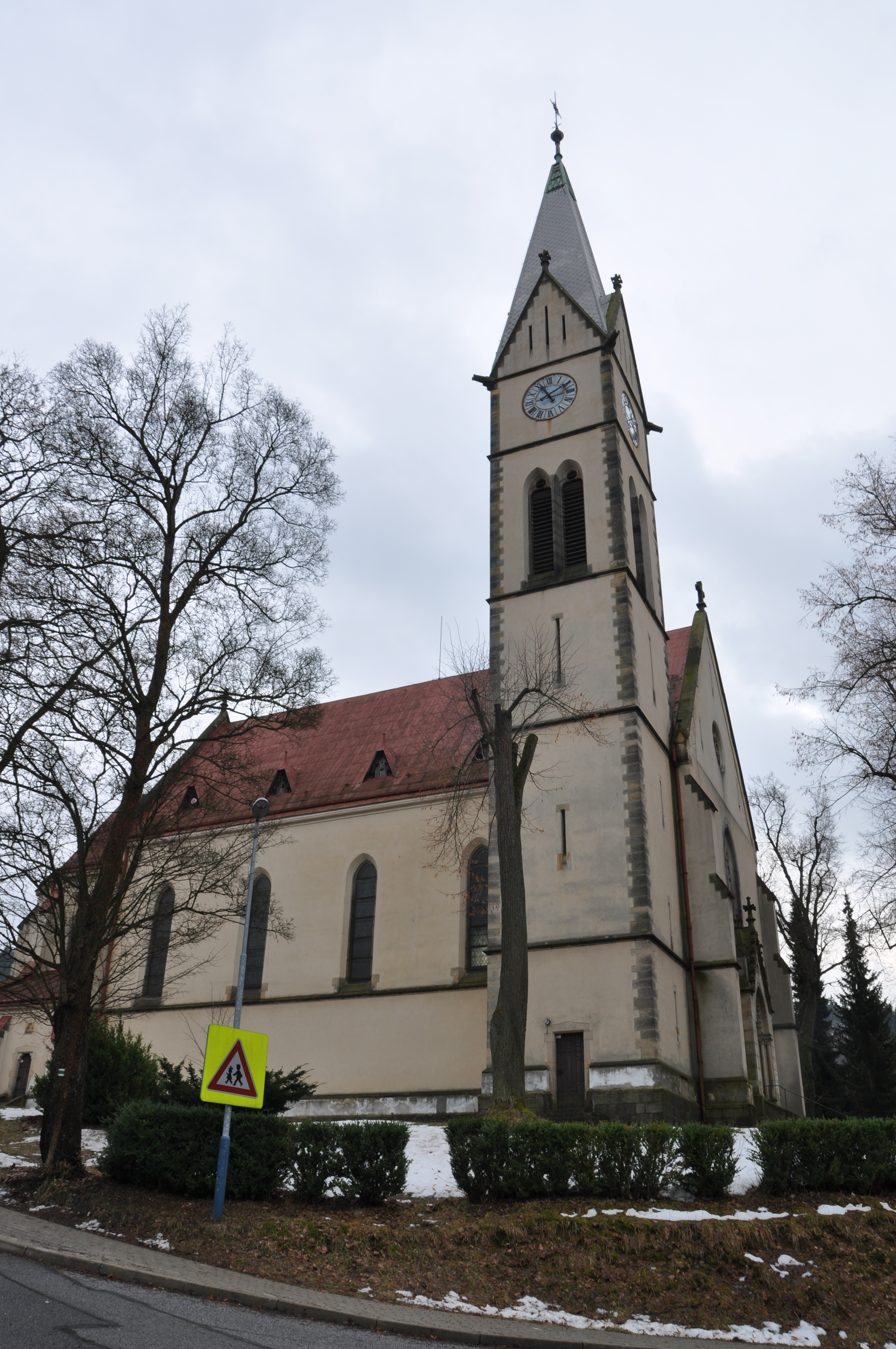
Church of Saint Francis of Assisi

The main landmark of the town is the Church of Saint Francis of Assisi. It was built in the neo-Gothic style in 1899–1901.

The mountain Špičák is known for the Tanvaldský Špičák observation tower. This stone tower was built in 1909 and is 18 m (59 ft) high.

== Notable people ==
- Libor Němeček (born 1968), tennis player and coach

== Twin towns – sister cities ==
Tanvald is twinned with:

- Burbach, Germany
- Lubomierz, Poland
- Marcinowice, Poland
- Wittichenau, Germany
