= Jizera Mountains =

Mountain range in the Czech Republic and Poland

- Czech: Jizerské hory; Polish: Góry Izerskie
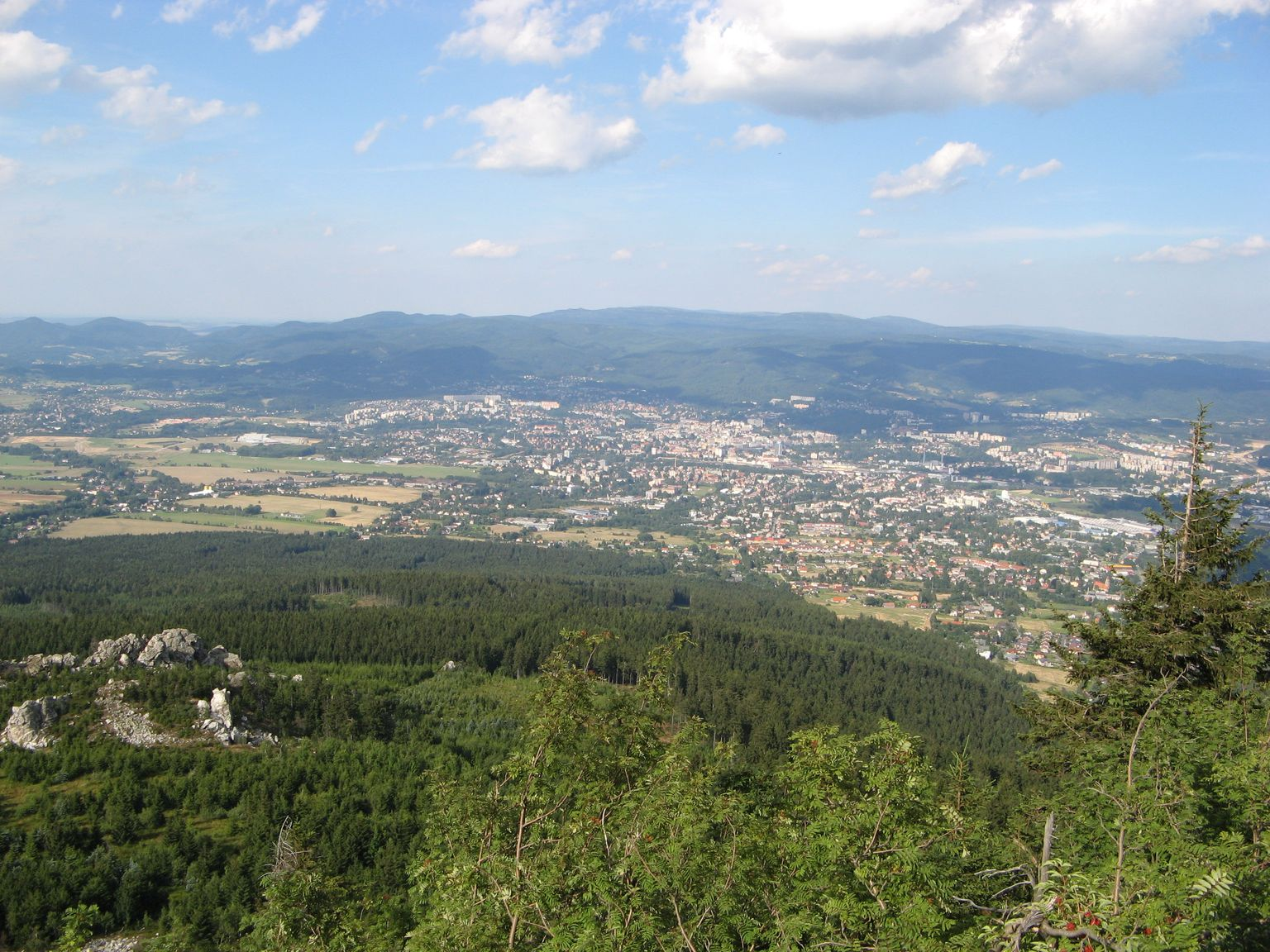
- View over Liberec to the Jizera Mountains from Mt. Ještěd

Highest point
- Peak: Wysoka Kopa
- Elevation: 1,127 m (3,698 ft)
- Coordinates: 50°51′1″N 15°25′12″E

Geography
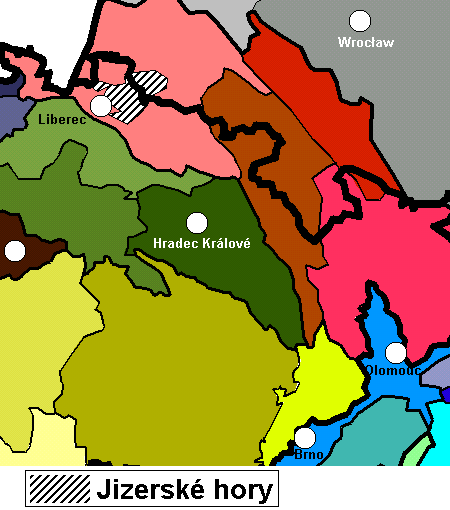
- Countries: Czech Republic and Poland
- States: Bohemia and Lower Silesia
- Range coordinates: 50°50′N 15°15′E
- Parent range: Western Sudetes

Geology
- Rock types: Granite and basalt

Jizera Mountains or Izera Mountains are part of the Western Sudetes on the border between the Czech Republic and Poland. The range got its name from the Jizera River, which rises at the southern base of the Smrk massif. The beech forests within the Jizera Mountains were added to the UNESCO World Heritage Site known as Ancient and Primeval Beech Forests of the Carpathians and Other Regions of Europe, because of their outstanding preservation and testimony to the ecological history of Europe (and the beech family specifically) since the Last Glacial Period.

== Geography ==
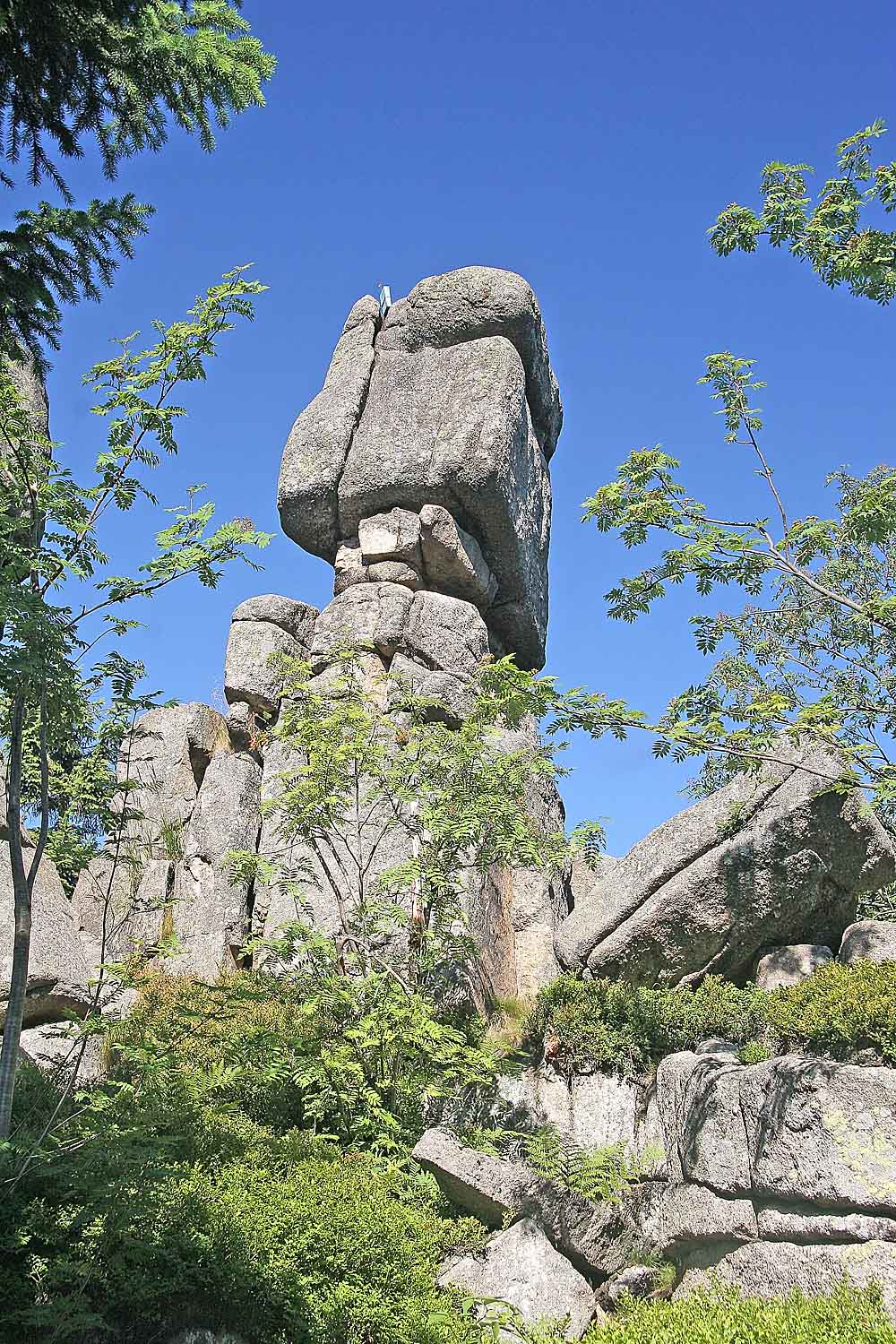
Sněžné věžičky (Czech "snow turret"): picturesque rock pinnacle in the Jizerské hory

The range stretches from the Lusatian Mountains (Zittau Mountains) in the northwest to the Krkonoše in the southeast. The Jizera Mountains comprise the sources of the Jizera river, as well as of the Kwisa and the Lusatian Neisse.

The major part in the south is formed from granite, in the northern part from gneisses and mica schists, with some areas formed from basalt.

The weather conditions are characterized by above-average annual precipitation. On 30 July 1897, the measuring station at Nová Louka recorded a daily precipitation amounting to 345.1 mm (13.6 inches), still an unbroken European record.

== Peaks ==
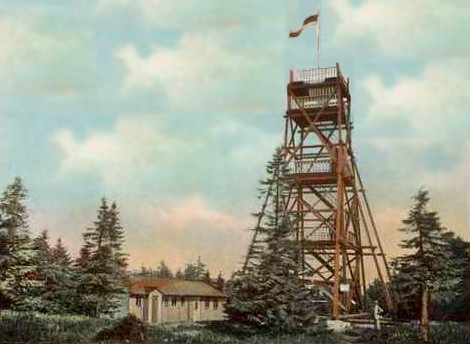
Dense forests on the Smrk summit around 1900

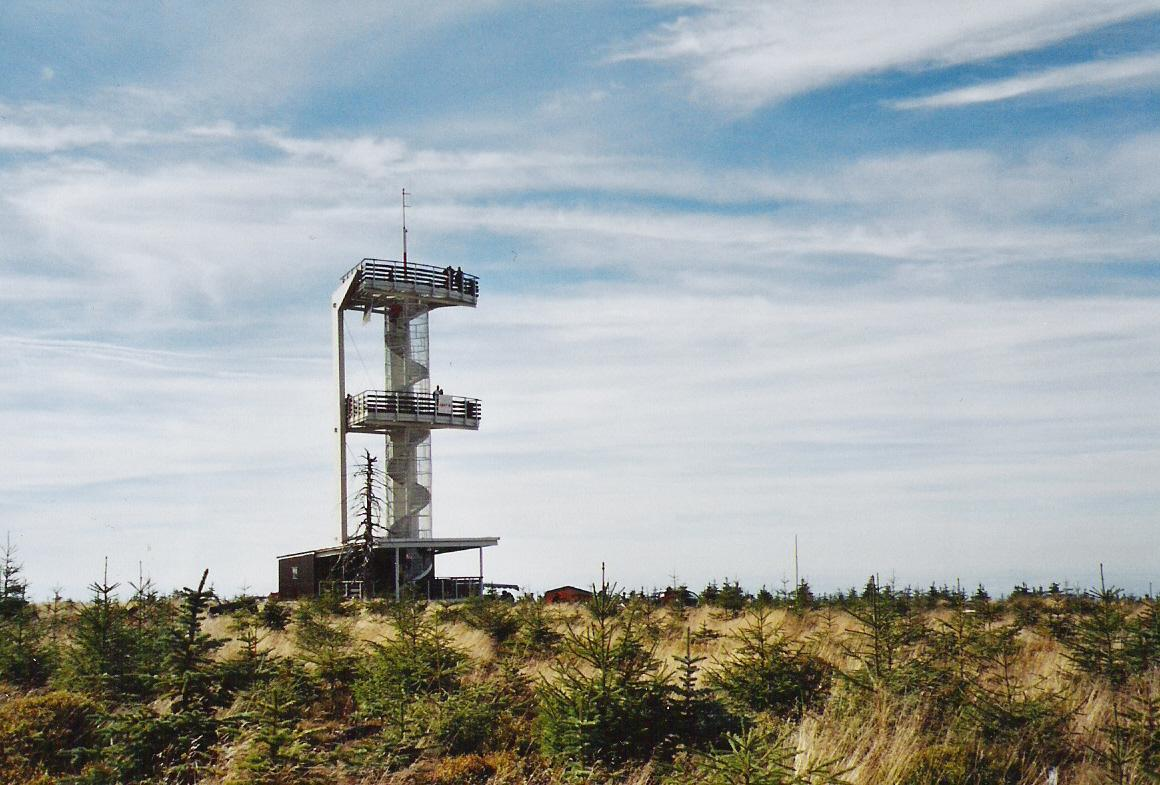
Forest dieback on top of the Smrk in 2003

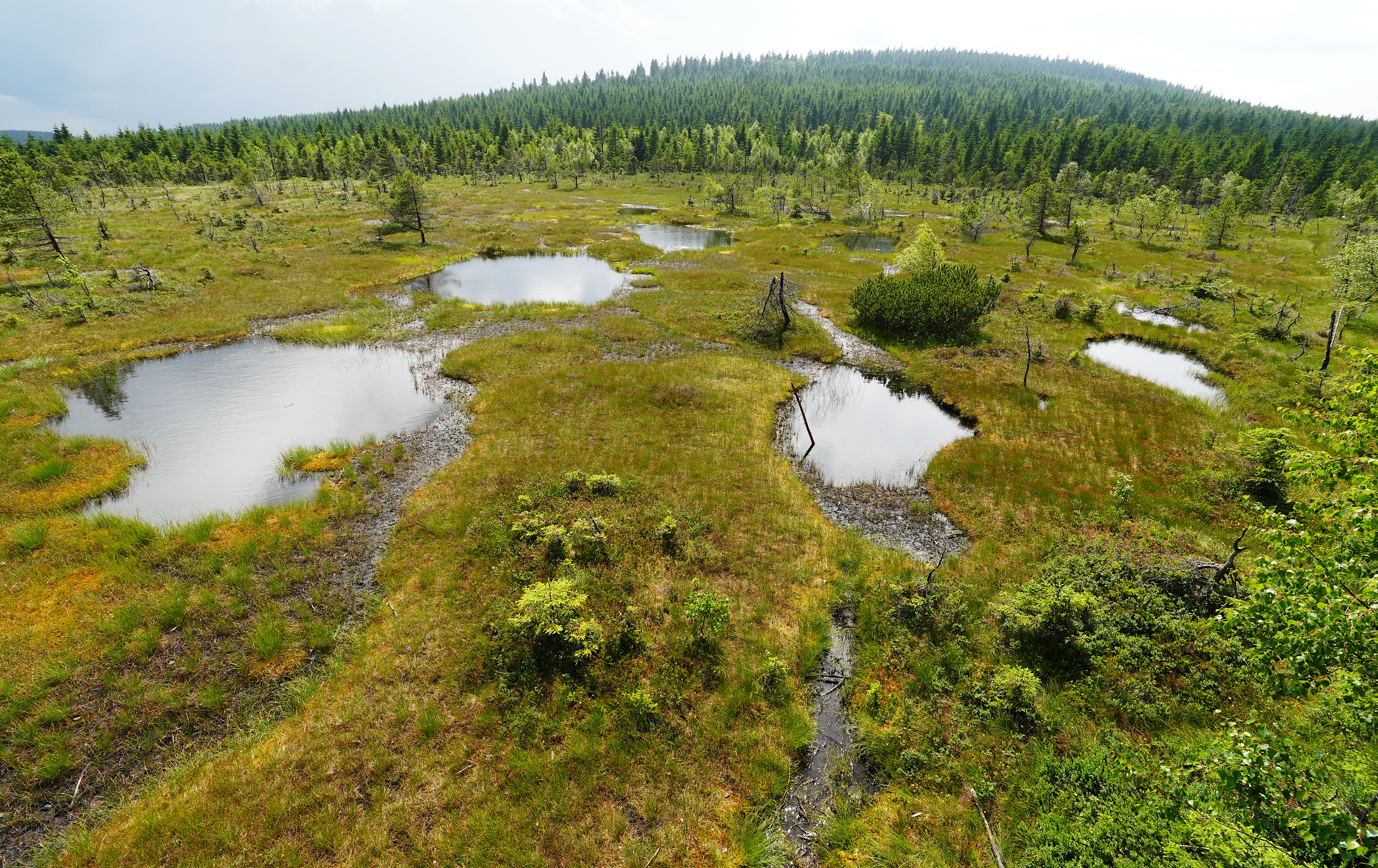
Na Čihadle moorland reserve

The highest peak is Wysoka Kopa (1,127 m; 3,698 ft) near the town of Szklarska Poręba in Poland. Nevertheless, a better-known mountain is Smrk (1,124 m; 3,688 ft), with a recently rebuilt look-out tower. Other peaks include Jizera (1,122 m; 3,681 ft) and Stóg Izerski (Heufuder, 1,107 m; 3,632 ft). The peaks in order of elevation:

- Wysoka Kopa, 1,127 m (3,698 ft); highest peak of the Jizera Mountains
- Smrk, 1,124 m (3,688 ft); highest peak of the Bohemian Jizera Mountains
- Jizera, 1,222 m (4,009 ft)
- Stóg Izerski, 1,107 m (3,632 ft)
- Smědavská hora, 1,084 m (3,556 ft)
- Bukovec, 1,005 m (3,297 ft); one of the highest basalt peaks in Europe
- Hvězda, 959 m (3,146 ft)
- Černá Studnice, 869 m (2,851 ft)
- Tanvaldský Špičák, 831 m (2,726 ft); skiing region near Tanvald
- Oldřichovský Špičák, 724 m (2,375 ft)

== History ==
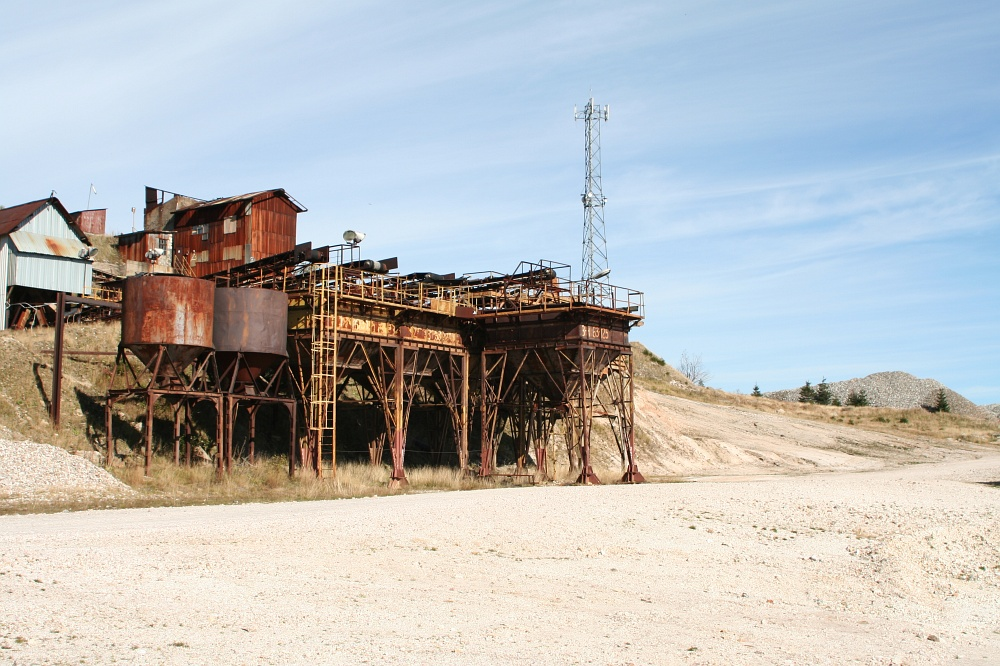
Quartz mine "Stanisław"

The first settlements in the area date back to prehistory. Later on, Celts, German tribes resides in the valleys until they left in 5th century. Later came Slavs. Since the 10th century, the border between Poland and Bohemia (Czechia) ran through the mountains. Following the fragmentation of Poland into smaller duchies, the Polish portion of the mountains was located in the duchies of Silesia, Legnica, Jawor and Lwówek. In 1281, Duke Bernard the Lightsome of the Piast dynasty granted a portion of the Izera Mountains to the Knights Hospitaller from Strzegom. In the 14th century, German-speaking colonists came and started clearing of the dense primeval forests. Permanent settlements were established. In the 16th century, several glass works were founded. Glassmaking had a profound effect on the ecosystem. The primeval forest was gradually replaced by fast-growing spruce monoculture. Other important industries included tin-mining, metallurgy and textile. The Tabulový kámen (German: Tafelstein, 1,072 m; 3,517 ft) on the northern edge of the Smrk Mountain marked the border between the properties of the Counts of Gallas in Friedland, Bohemia, the von Gersdorff family from Meffersdorf (Unięcice, now part of Pobiedna), Upper Lusatia and the Counts of Schaffgotsch from Schreiberhau (Szklarska Poręba), Lower Silesia.

Following the defeat of Nazi Germany in World War II, in 1945, the northern part of the Jizera Mountains became again part of Poland, and the southern was restored to Czechoslovakia. The German population of the area was expelled in accordance with the Potsdam Agreement and replaced by Poles on the Polish and Czechs on the Czechoslovak side of the mountains. The ecosystem was badly hit by emissions, produced by lignite fired power stations located in the Zittau basin, part of Europe's ecological Black Triangle. Weakened spruce forest, less resistant against various types of parasites, were on the verge of extinction. The higher parts of the mountains, once densely wooded, became largely treeless, in part also because of excessive deforestation. New roads cut through the once-secluded landscape.

The situation improved only after the fall of communism in 1989. Open-pit coal mines in the former East Germany were closed, as well as several major power plants. Emission filters were installed at the immense Turów Power Station in Bogatynia on the Polish side of Lusatian Neisse. At the same time large-scale reforestation projects were started.

== Tourism ==
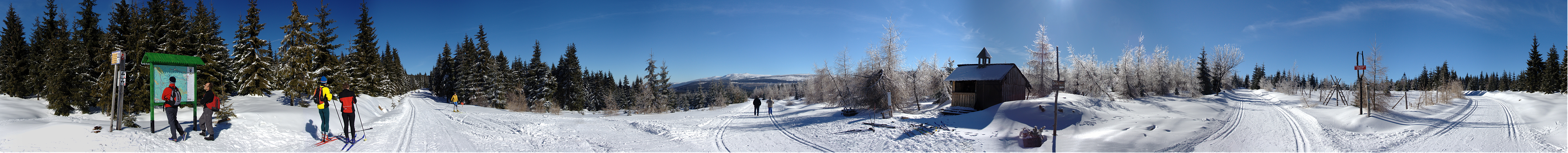
Rozdroże pod Cichą Równią - Jizera Mountains

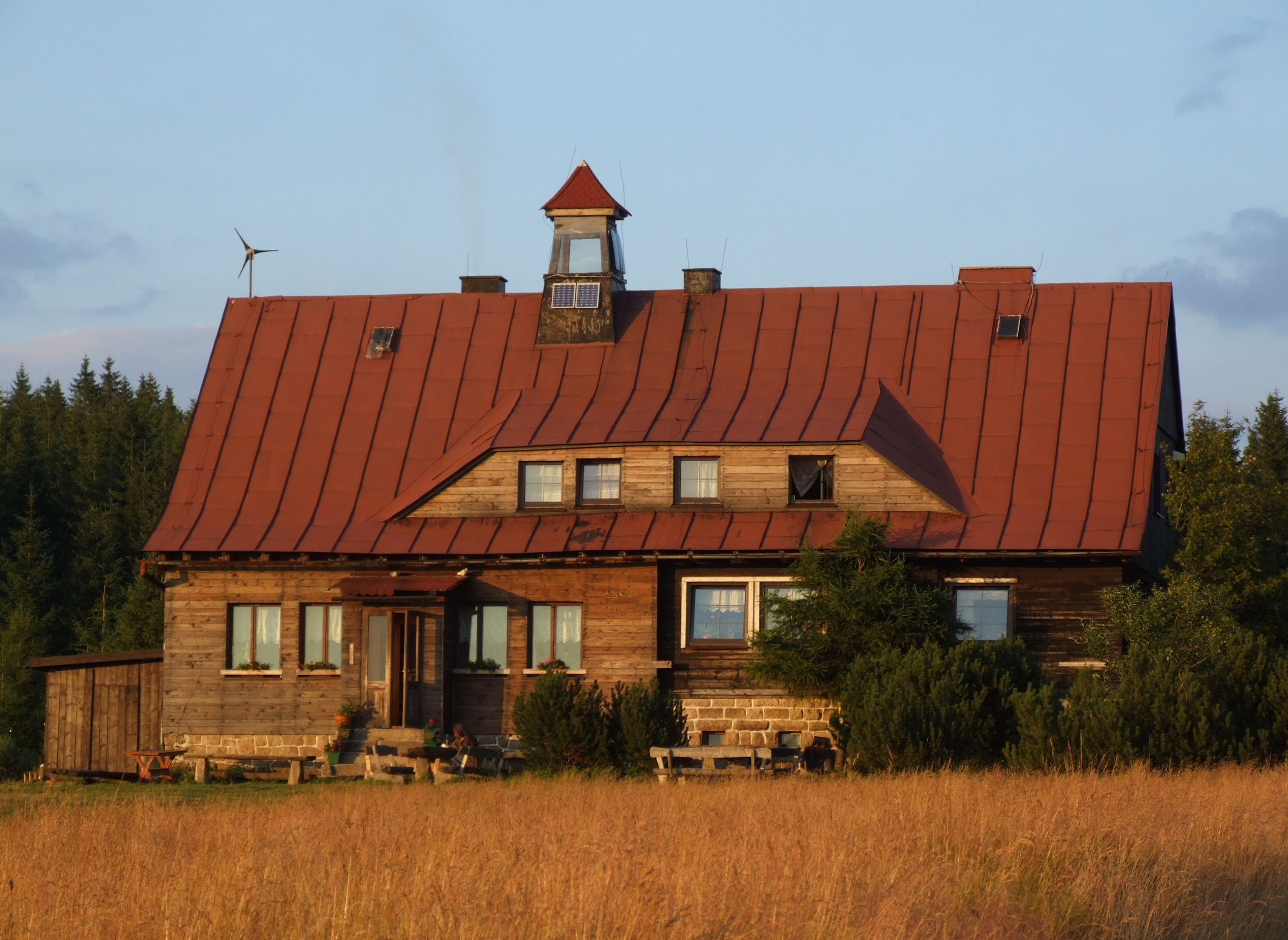
Mountain hut Chatka Górzystów in Polish part of Jizera Mountains

The Jizera Mountains are an attractive location for winter sports, cycling and hiking. The centre for both downhill skiing and ski run is Bedřichov. The international cross-country races Jizerská 50 and Bieg Piastów (in Polana Jakuszycka) take place there. Its summer MTB counterpart is also gaining popularity.

The towns surrounding the mountains include Liberec, Frýdlant v Čechách, Nové Město pod Smrkem, Świeradów Zdrój, Szklarska Poręba, Desná, Tanvald and Jablonec nad Nisou.

== Protections ==
Large parts of the Jizera Mountains are under some form of protection. In the smaller Polish parts, the peat bogs in Jizera Valley are part of a relatively small nature protection of about 5 km^{2} (1.9 sq mi); Rezerwat Torfowiska Doliny Izery. In the Czech parts, Jizera Mountains Protected Landscape Area (CHKO Jizerské hory) covers 368 km^{2} (142 sq mi), or almost all of the Czech parts of the mountains. This landscape protection contains several reserves, including the Jizera Dark Sky Park (Rašeliniště Jizery), dedicated to star watching.

== Culture ==
A museum in the quarter Neugablonz of the Bavarian town Kaufbeuren is devoted to the German history of the region.

== Literature ==
- (in Czech, German, and English) Weiss, Siegfried (2000) Moje Jizerky - Jizerské hory v proměnách času, Mein Isergebirge - Das Isergebirge im Wandel der Zeit, My Jizera Hills - The Jizera Mountains through a changing of time, Buk
- (in Czech) Nevrlý, Miroslav (1996) Kniha o Jizerských horách, 3rd edition, Civitas
