= Tomáš Kučera =

Tomáš Kučera may refer to:

- Tomáš Kučera (skier) (born 1948), Czech Nordic combined skier
- Tomáš Kučera (canoeist) (born 1985), Slovak slalom canoeist
- Tomáš Kučera (footballer, born 1977), Czech footballer
- Tomáš Kučera (footballer, born 1984), Slovak footballer
- Tomáš Kučera (footballer, born 1991), Czech footballer

== See also ==
- Kučera
