= Kučera =

Kučera (feminine: Kučerová) is a Czech and Slovak surname, deribed from the nickname for a person with curly hair: the word kučera literally means "curl".. The Germanized form of the surname is Kutschera and the Hungarized form is Kucsera. Notable people with the surname include:

== Sports ==
- František Kučera (born 1968), Czech ice hockey player
- Jakub Kučera (born 1997), Czech footballer
- Jiří Kučera (born 1966), Czech ice hockey player
- John Kucera (born 1984), Canadian alpine ski racer
- Karol Kučera (born 1974), Slovak tennis player
- Magdalena Kučerová (born 1976), Czech-German tennis player
- Marcel Kučera (born 1971), Czech ice hockey player
- Martin Kučera (born 1990), Slovak athlete
- Martin Kučera (ice hockey) (born 1978), Slovak ice hockey player
- Milan Kučera (canoeist) (born 1963), Slovak slalom canoer
- Milan Kučera (Nordic combined) (born 1974), Czech Nordic combined skier
- Nikol Kučerová (born 1989), Czech freestyle skier
- Oldřich Kučera (1914–1964), Czech ice hockey player
- Ondřej Kučera (born 1987), Czech footballer
- Radim Kučera (born 1974), Czech footballer
- Renata Kučerová (born 1979), Czech tennis player
- René Kučera (born 1972), Czech sprint canoer
- Rudolf Kučera (1940–2024), Czech footballer
- Štěpán Kučera (born 1984), Czech footballer
- Tomáš Kučera (skier) (born 1948), Czech Nordic combined skier
- Tomáš Kučera (canoeist) (born 1985), Slovak slalom canoeist
- Tomáš Kučera (footballer, born 1977), Czech footballer
- Tomáš Kučera (footballer, born 1984), Slovak footballer
- Tomáš Kučera (footballer, born 1991), Czech footballer
- Vladimír Kučera (1942–2007), Czech boxer

== Other ==
- Adriana Kučerová (born 1976), Slovak soprano
- Alena Kučerová (1935–2026), Czech printmaker
- Bob Kucera (born 1944), Australian politician
- Bohumil Kučera (1874–1921), Czech physicist
- Daniel Kucera (1923–2017), American Roman Catholic bishop
- Eduard Kučera (born 1953), Czech entrepreneur
- Gabriela Kučerová (born 1977), Czech-German tennis player
- Henry Kučera (1925–2010), Czech-American linguist
- Jaroslav Kučera (1929–1991), Czech cinematographer
- Louis Benedict Kucera (1888–1957), American Roman Catholic bishop
- Lubica Kucerova (born 1983), Slovak fashion designer
- Oton Kučera (1857–1931), Croatian astronomer
- Vojtěch Kučera (born 1975), Czech poet

== See also ==
- Kudrna, same etymology
