= Oleška (river) =

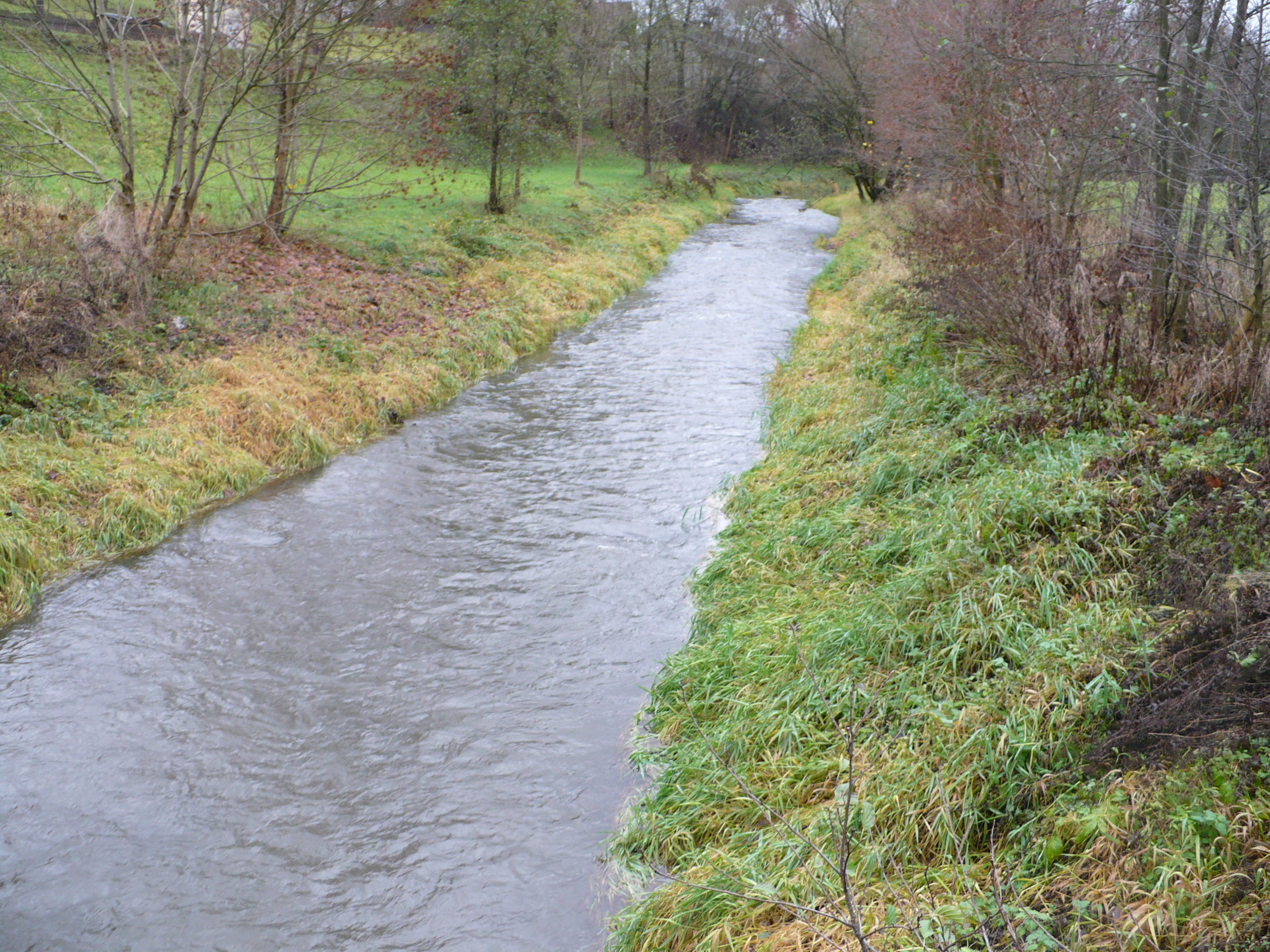
- The Oleška in Košťálov

Location
- Country: Czech Republic
- Regions: Liberec; Hradec Králové

Physical characteristics
- Source
  - location: Studenec, Giant Mountains Foothills
  - coordinates: 50°34′13″N 15°32′48″E
  - elevation: 538 m (1,765 ft)
- Mouth
  - location: Jizera
  - coordinates: 50°36′4″N 15°19′54″E
  - elevation: 316 m (1,037 ft)
- Length: 36.0 km (22.4 mi)
- Basin size: 171.3 km^{2} (66.1 sq mi)
- Discharge
  - average: 1.74 m^{3}/s (61 cu ft/s) near estuary

Basin features
- Progression: Jizera→ Elbe→ North Sea

The Oleška is a river in the Czech Republic, a left tributary of the Jizera River. It flows through the Liberec and Hradec Králové regions. It is 36.0 km (22.4 mi) long.

== Etymology ==
The name is derived from the Czech word olše (i.e. 'alder'), meaning "water flowing between alders".

== Characteristic ==
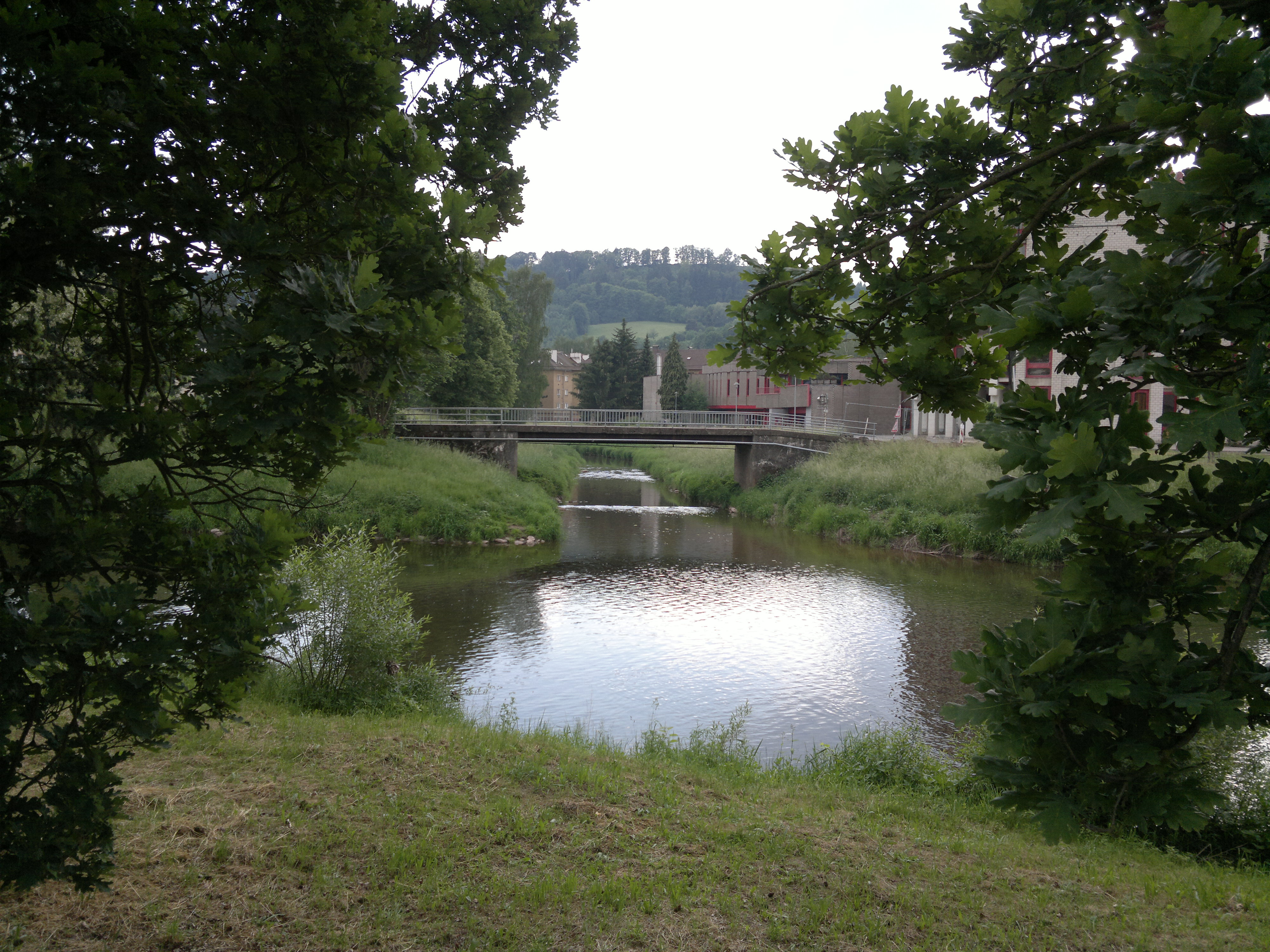
Confluence of the Oleška and Jizera

The Oleška originates in the territory of Studenec in the Giant Mountains Foothills at an elevation of 538 m (1,765 ft) and flows to Semily, where it enters the Jizera River at an elevation of 316 m (1,037 ft). It is 36.0 km (22.4 mi) long. Its drainage basin has an area of 171.3 km^{2} (66.1 sq mi).

The longest tributaries of the Oleška are:

Tributary	Length (km)	Side
Popelka	13.1	left
Tampelačka	10.1	right
Rokytka	7.8	left

== Course ==
The river flows through the municipal territories of Studenec, Levínská Olešnice, Stará Paka, Bělá, Libštát, Košťálov, Slaná and Semily.

== Fauna ==
Fish species that live in the river include brown trout, rainbow trout, brook trout and grayling.

== See also ==
- List of rivers of the Czech Republic
