= Popelka =

Popelka can refer to:

Folklore

- the Czech name of Cinderella

Geography

- Lomnice nad Popelkou, a town in the Czech Republic, in the Liberec region
- Nová Ves nad Popelkou, a village and municipality in the Czech Republic, in the Liberec region

People

- Robert Popelka, American football player
- Vladimír Popelka, Czech cyclist
