= Nová Ves nad Popelkou =

- Municipality
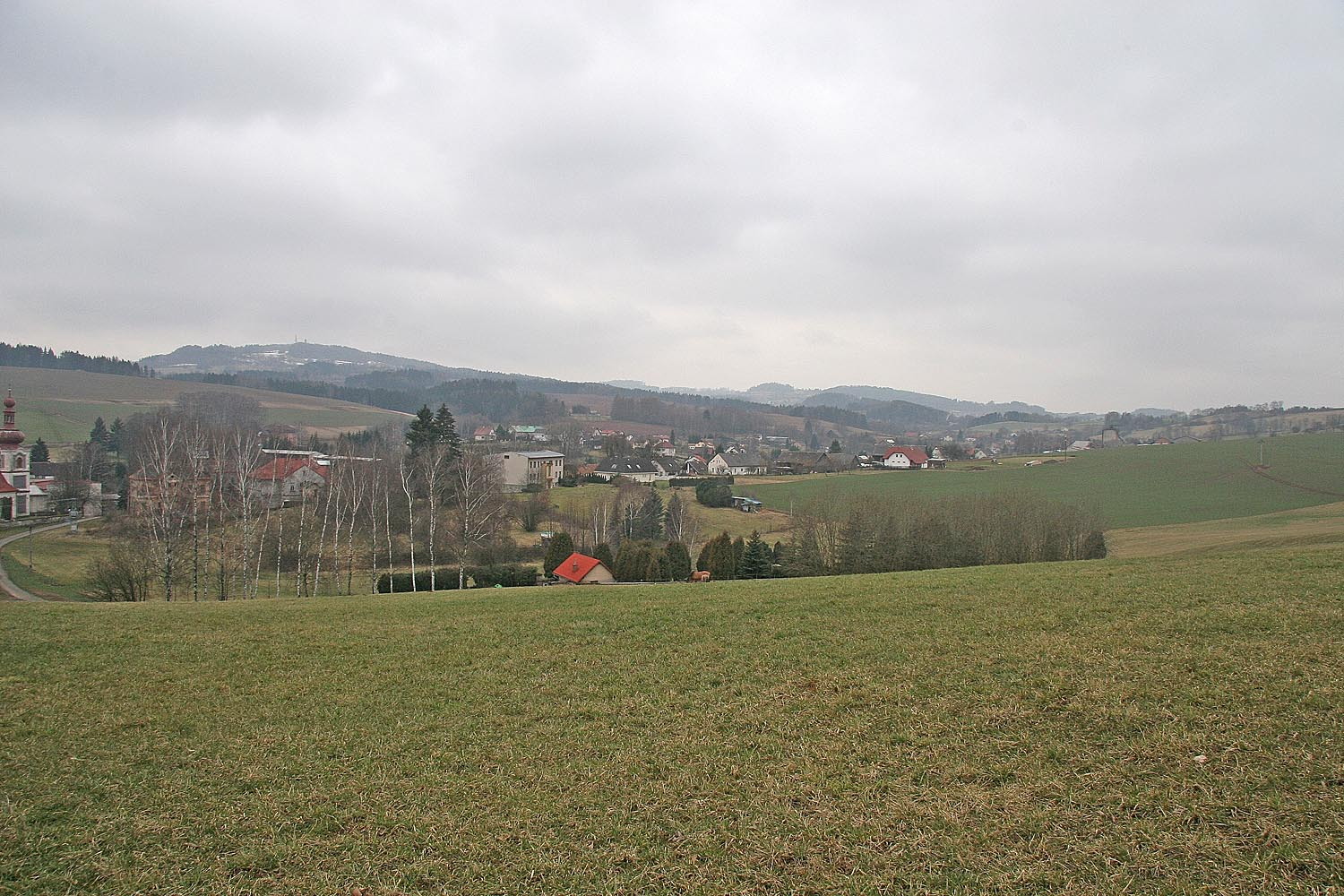
- View from the northeast

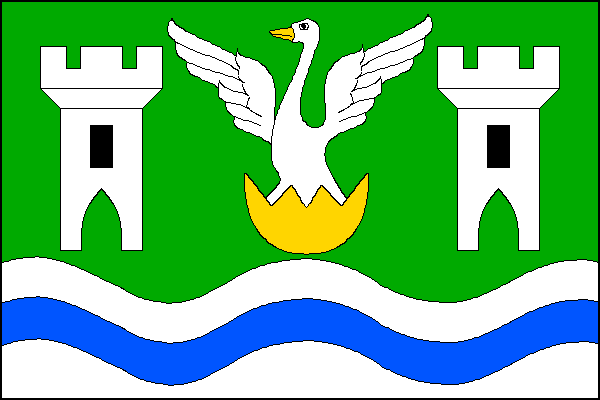
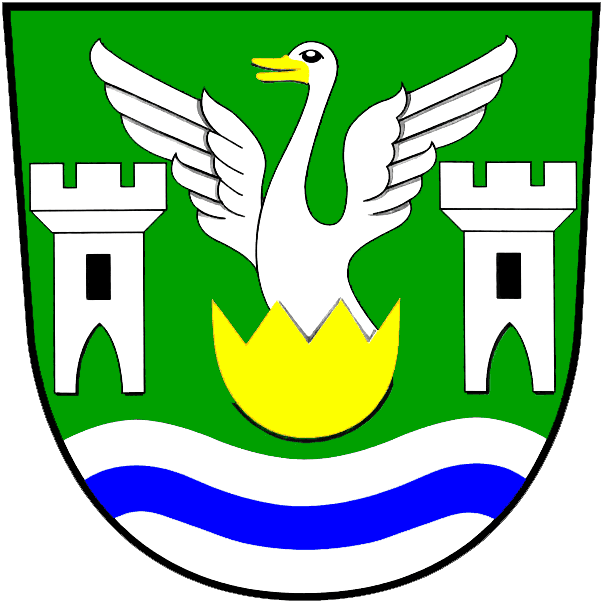
- Flag Coat of arms

- Location in the Czech Republic
- Coordinates: 50°31′13″N 15°24′43″E
- Country: Czech Republic
- Region: Liberec
- District: Semily
- First mentioned: 1369

Area
  - Total: 12.14 km^{2} (4.69 sq mi)
- Elevation: 428 m (1,404 ft)

Population (2026-01-01)
  - Total: 666
  - Density: 54.9/km^{2} (142/sq mi)
- Time zone: UTC+1 (CET)
  - Summer (DST): UTC+2 (CEST)
- Postal code: 512 71
- Website: www.novavesnadpopelkou.cz

Nová Ves nad Popelkou (German: Neudorf an der Popelka) is a municipality and village in Semily District in the Liberec Region of the Czech Republic. It has about 700 inhabitants.

== Etymology ==
In Czech, the name means 'new village upon the Popelka'. The former name of the village is Nová Ves u Lomnice na Jičínsku ('new village near Lomnice in the Jičín region').

== Geography ==
Nová Ves nad Popelkou is located about 35 kilometres (22 mi) southeast of Liberec. It lies in the Giant Mountains Foothills. The highest point is near the top of the hill Smíta at 562 m (1,844 ft) above sea level. The Popelka Stream flows through the municipality. There is one fishpond in the municipality called Taliňák.

== History ==
The first written mention of Nová Ves nad Popelkou is from 1369. The exact year of the village's foundation is unknown, but it was probably between 1200 and 1250. According to an untrustworthy source, the Slavic settlers built here the Church of Saint Procopius already in 1097.

== Demographics ==
Historical population

Year	Pop.	±%
1869	1,422	—
1880	1,348	−5.2%
1890	1,377	+2.2%
1900	1,251	−9.2%
1910	1,229	−1.8%

Year	Pop.	±%
1921	1,132	−7.9%
1930	1,112	−1.8%
1950	847	−23.8%
1961	801	−5.4%
1970	759	−5.2%

Year	Pop.	±%
1980	696	−8.3%
1991	671	−3.6%
2001	649	−3.3%
2011	620	−4.5%
2021	625	+0.8%

Source: Censuses

== Transport ==
Nová Ves nad Popelkou is located on a short railway line of local importance from Lomnice nad Popelkou to Stará Paka.

== Sights ==
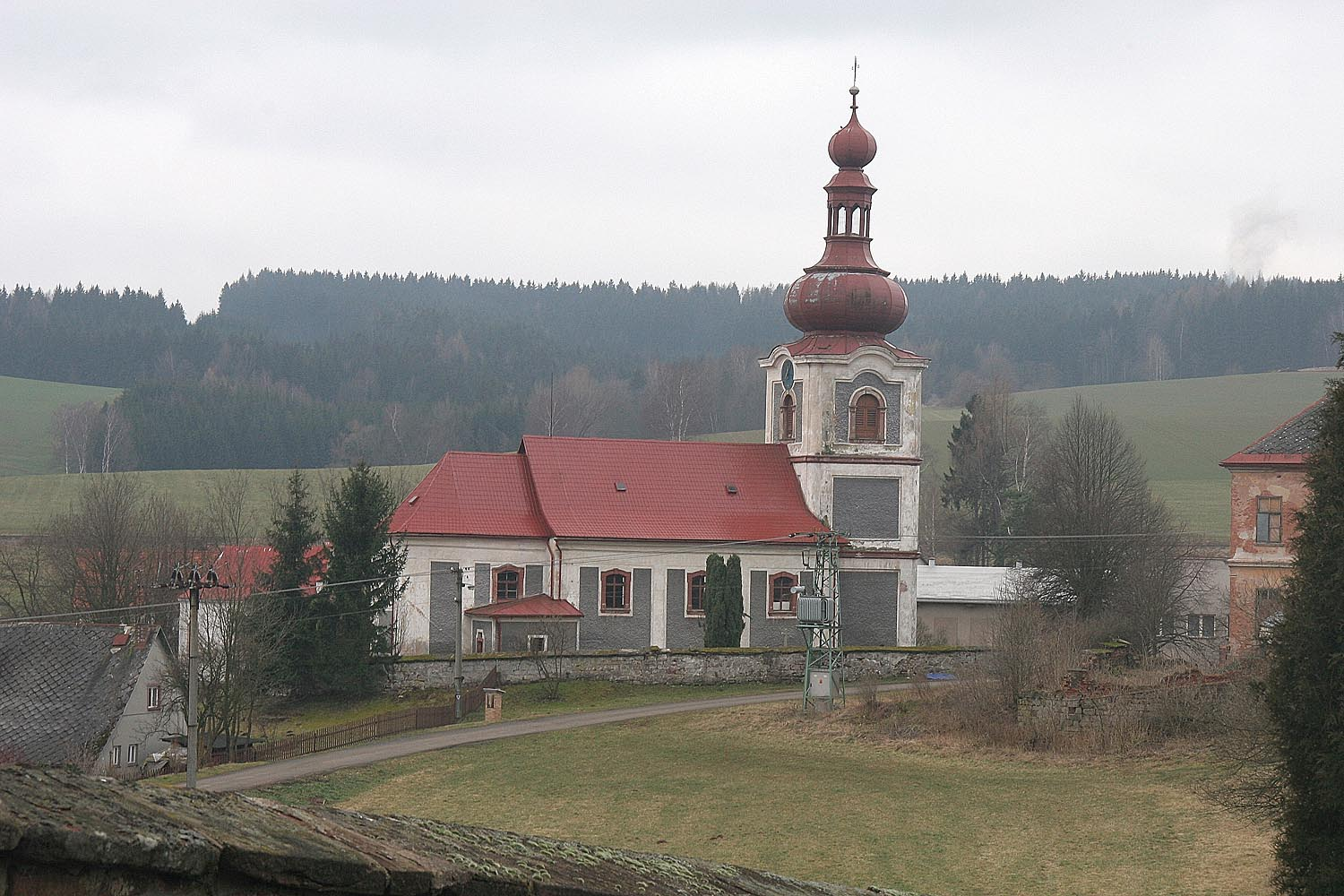
Church of Saint Procopius

The main landmark of Nová Ves nad Popelkou is the Church of Saint Procopius. It went through several renovations over the years and its current form dates from 1747. The church tower is from 1749.
