= Kutschera =

Kutschera is a Germanized version of Czech surname Kučera. Notable people with the surname include:

- Alexander Kutschera, German footballer
- Chris Kutschera, French journalist
- Elise Kutscherra de Nyss, German operatic soprano
- Eugen Kutschera (1852–1918), Czech composer, conductor, teacher and music director
- Franz Kutschera, German SS general
- Franz Clemens Kutschera (1822–?), Austrian entomologist
- Hermann Kutschera, Austrian architect
- Johann Nepomuk von Kutschera (1766–1832), Austrian general
- Lore Kutschera (1917–2008), Austrian botanist, ecologist, phytosociologist, and educator
- Maria von Trapp (née Kutschera), stepmother and matriarch of the Trapp Family Singers.
- Ulrich Kutschera, German scientist
- Walter Kutschera, Austrian physicist

== See also ==
- Operation Kutschera, Polish resistance operation to assassinate Franz Kutschera
