= Studenec (Semily District) =

- Municipality
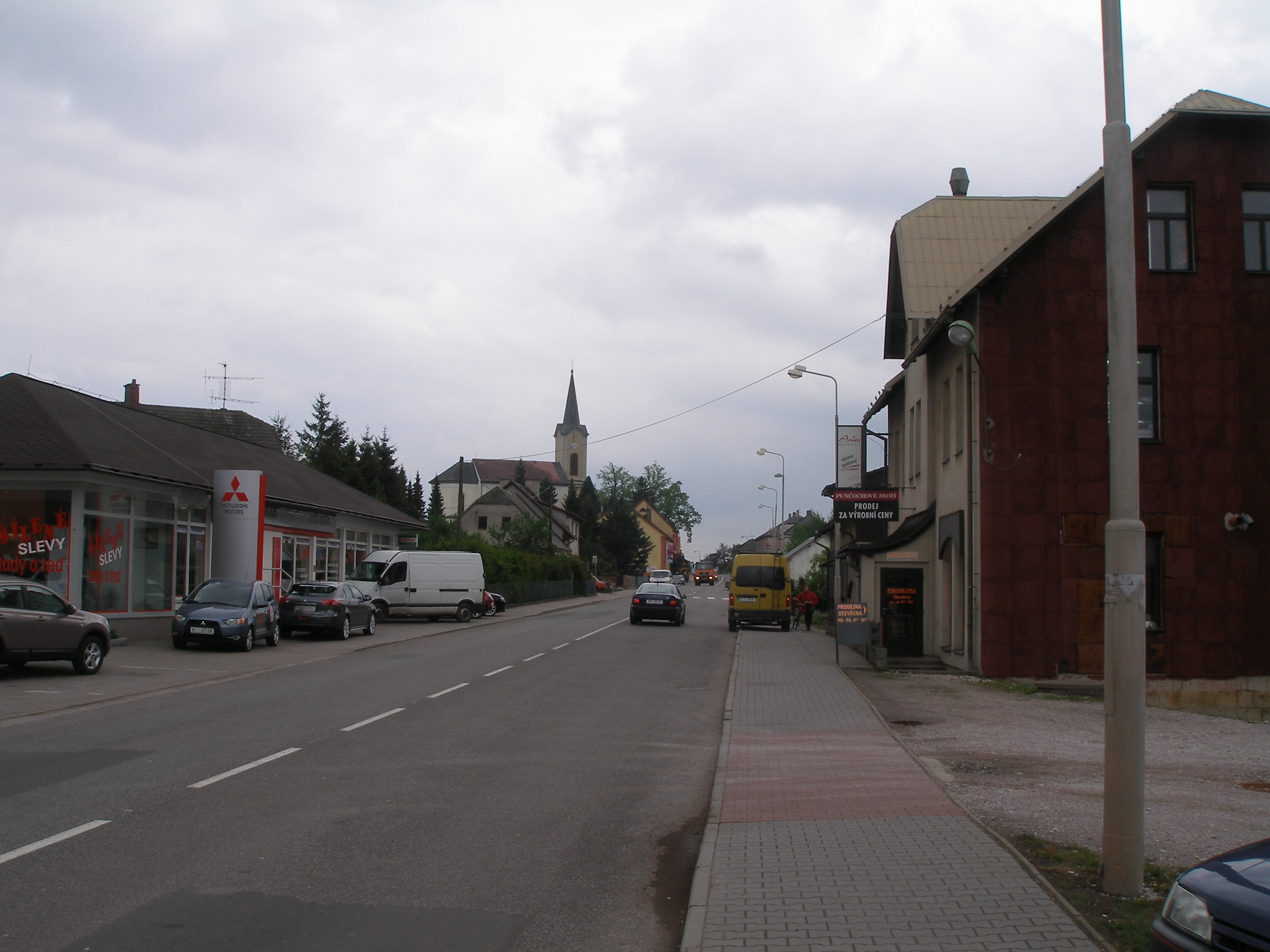
- Main road and Church of Saint John the Baptist

- Flag Coat of arms

- Location in the Czech Republic
- Coordinates: 50°33′13″N 15°32′58″E
- Country: Czech Republic
- Region: Liberec
- District: Semily
- First mentioned: 1395

Area
  - Total: 16.87 km^{2} (6.51 sq mi)
- Elevation: 514 m (1,686 ft)

Population (2026-01-01)
  - Total: 1,843
  - Density: 109.2/km^{2} (282.9/sq mi)
- Time zone: UTC+1 (CET)
  - Summer (DST): UTC+2 (CEST)
- Postal codes: 512 33, 514 01
- Website: www.studenec.cz

Studenec is a municipality and village in Semily District in the Liberec Region of the Czech Republic. It has about 1,800 inhabitants.

== Administrative division ==
Studenec consists of three municipal parts (in brackets population according to the 2021 census):

- Studenec (1,246)
- Rovnáčov (173)
- Zálesní Lhota (435)

== Etymology ==
The Old Czech word studenec meant 'source (of the river)'.

== Geography ==
Studenec is located about 40 kilometres (25 mi) southeast of Liberec. It lies in the Giant Mountains Foothills. The highest point is the hill Stráž at 630 m (2,067 ft) above sea level. The Oleška River originates in Rovnáčov and then flows across the municipality.

== History ==
According to chronicles, in the 11th century, the hill Stráž (lit. 'guard') under its Latin name Custodius was a guarding point near a trade route. The first written mention of Studenec on the foot of this hill is from 1395, when it was administered by the nearby Levín Castle. From the early 16th century until 1584, Studenec was a property of the noble Trčka of Lípa family. Another notable owner was Albrecht von Wallenstein, who bought it in 1628, but sold it shortly afterwards.

In the 19th century, the domestic textile production rapidly expanded and Studenec became nicknamed "village of weavers". At the beginning of the 20th century, the village had 2,500 inhabitants and more than 1,200 looms worked in cottages. With the development of industrial production, domestic weaving gradually disappeared. However, its tradition led to the establishment of a weaving mill in 1911, which grew into one of the most important textile companies in pre-war Czechoslovakia under the brand Fejfar & Mládek.

== Demographics ==
Historical population

Year	Pop.	±%
1869	3,667	—
1880	3,520	−4.0%
1890	3,534	+0.4%
1900	3,411	−3.5%
1910	3,088	−9.5%

Year	Pop.	±%
1921	2,768	−10.4%
1930	2,812	+1.6%
1950	1,837	−34.7%
1961	1,899	+3.4%
1970	1,945	+2.4%

Year	Pop.	±%
1980	1,873	−3.7%
1991	1,712	−8.6%
2001	1,704	−0.5%
2011	1,778	+4.3%
2021	1,854	+4.3%

Source: Censuses

== Transport ==
There are no railways or major roads passing through the municipality.

== Sights ==
The main landmark of Studenec is the Church of Saint John the Baptist. Its current Neo-Romanesque form dates from 1868.

== Notable people ==
- Jiří Šlitr (1924–1969), songwriter, pianist, singer and actor
- Květa Jeriová (born 1956), cross-country skier

== Twin towns – sister cities ==
Studenec is twinned with:

- Zuberec, Slovakia
