= Kudrna =

Kudrna (feminine: Kudrnová) is a Czech and Slovak surname derived from the nickname. The word kudrna literally means "curl". It may refer to:

- Andrej Kudrna, Slovak ice hockey player
- Bohumil Kudrna, Czech canoeist
- Jan Kudrna, Czech ice hockey player
- Jaroslav Kudrna, Czech ice hockey player
- Ladislav Kudrna, Czech ice hockey player
- Vladimír Kudrna, Czech sport shooter
- Zdeněk Kudrna, Czech speedway rider

== See also ==
- Kučera, same etymology
- Kudrnáč
