= Kuczera =

Kuczera is a Polish surname.It may also be borrozed from Czech surname Kučera meanig "hairlock", "hair curl"Notable people with the name include:

- Anna Kuczera (born 1994), Polish judoka
- Janina Kuczera (1925–2022), Polish biophysicist and professor
- Jerzy Kuczera (1951–2023), Polish stage and film actor
- Piotr Kuczera (born 1995), Polish judoka
