= Libštát =

- Market town
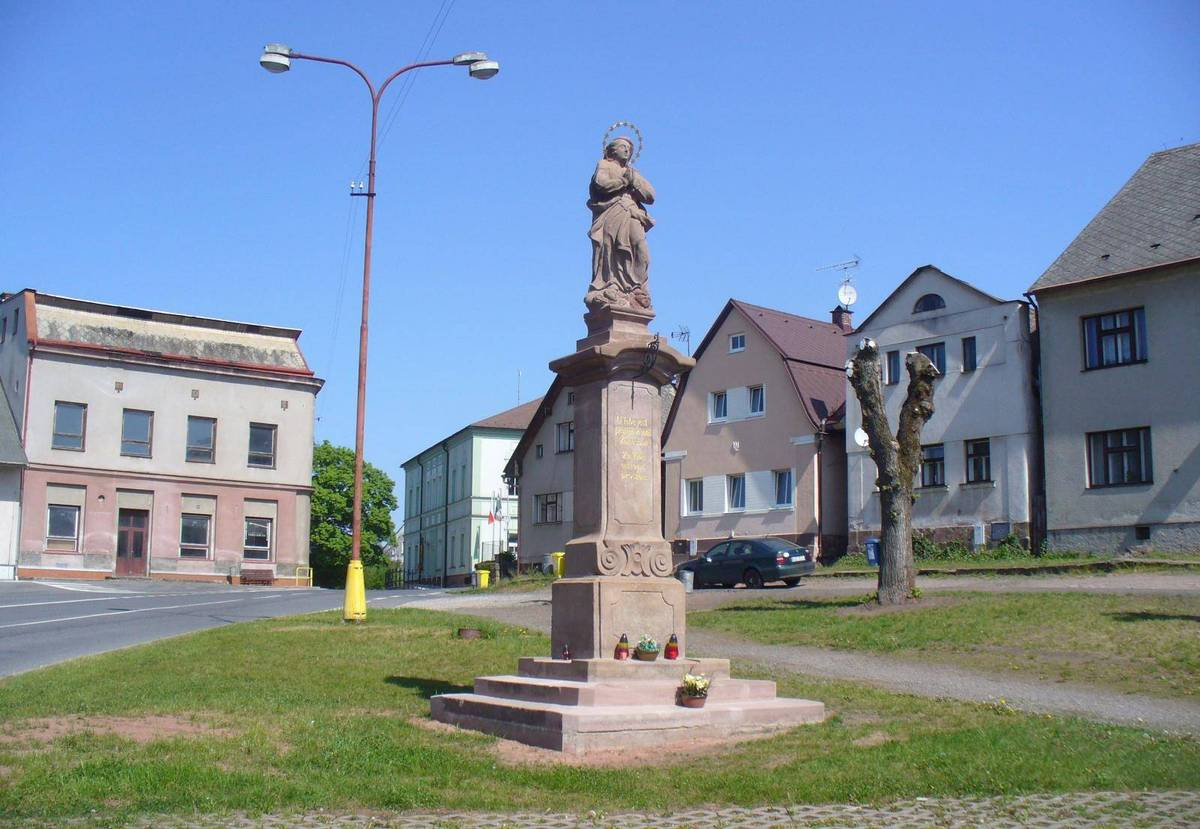
- Centre of Libštát

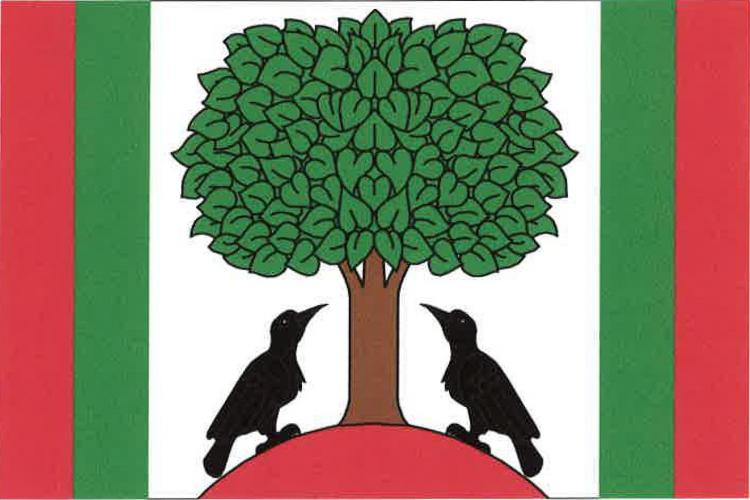
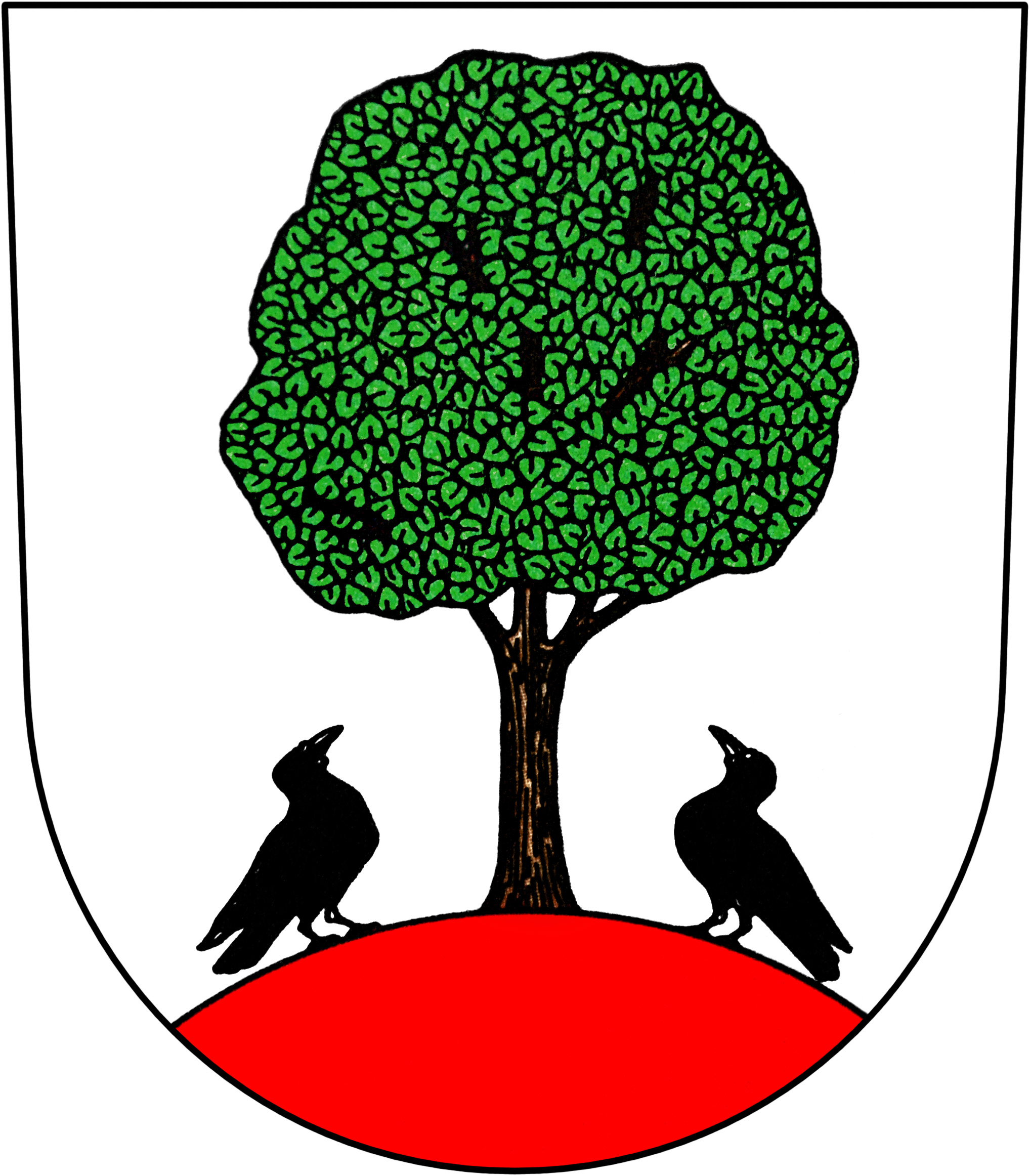
- Flag Coat of arms

- Location in the Czech Republic
- Coordinates: 50°33′34″N 15°24′58″E
- Country: Czech Republic
- Region: Liberec
- District: Semily
- First mentioned: 1322

Area
  - Total: 10.13 km^{2} (3.91 sq mi)
- Elevation: 364 m (1,194 ft)

Population (2026-01-01)
  - Total: 900
  - Density: 89/km^{2} (230/sq mi)
- Time zone: UTC+1 (CET)
  - Summer (DST): UTC+2 (CEST)
- Postal code: 512 03
- Website: www.libstat.e-obec.cz

Libštát (Czech pronunciation: [ˈlɪbʃtaːt]; German: Liebstadtl) is a market town in Semily District in the Liberec Region of the Czech Republic. It has about 900 inhabitants.

== Etymology ==
The name was derived from the Middle High German words liube stat, meaning 'nice place'.

== Geography ==
Libštát is located about 32 kilometres (20 mi) southeast of Liberec. It lies in the Giant Mountains Foothills. The highest point is the hill U Jeřábu at 517 m (1,696 ft) above sea level. The Oleška River flows through the market town.

== History ==
The first written mention of Libštát is from 1322, when it was a property of Hynek of Waldstein. The village was probably founded in the 13th century by German immigrants. The Waldstein family owned Libštát until 1391. After that, less important noble families took turns in ownership. From 1525, the village was referred to as a market town.

== Demographics ==
Historical population

Year	Pop.	±%
1869	1,219	—
1880	1,351	+10.8%
1890	1,373	+1.6%
1900	1,573	+14.6%
1910	1,760	+11.9%

Year	Pop.	±%
1921	1,550	−11.9%
1930	1,447	−6.6%
1950	1,089	−24.7%
1961	1,038	−4.7%
1970	984	−5.2%

Year	Pop.	±%
1980	924	−6.1%
1991	971	+5.1%
2001	981	+1.0%
2011	952	−3.0%
2021	918	−3.6%

Source: Censuses

== Transport ==
Libštát is located on the railway line Liberec–Jaroměř.

== Sights ==
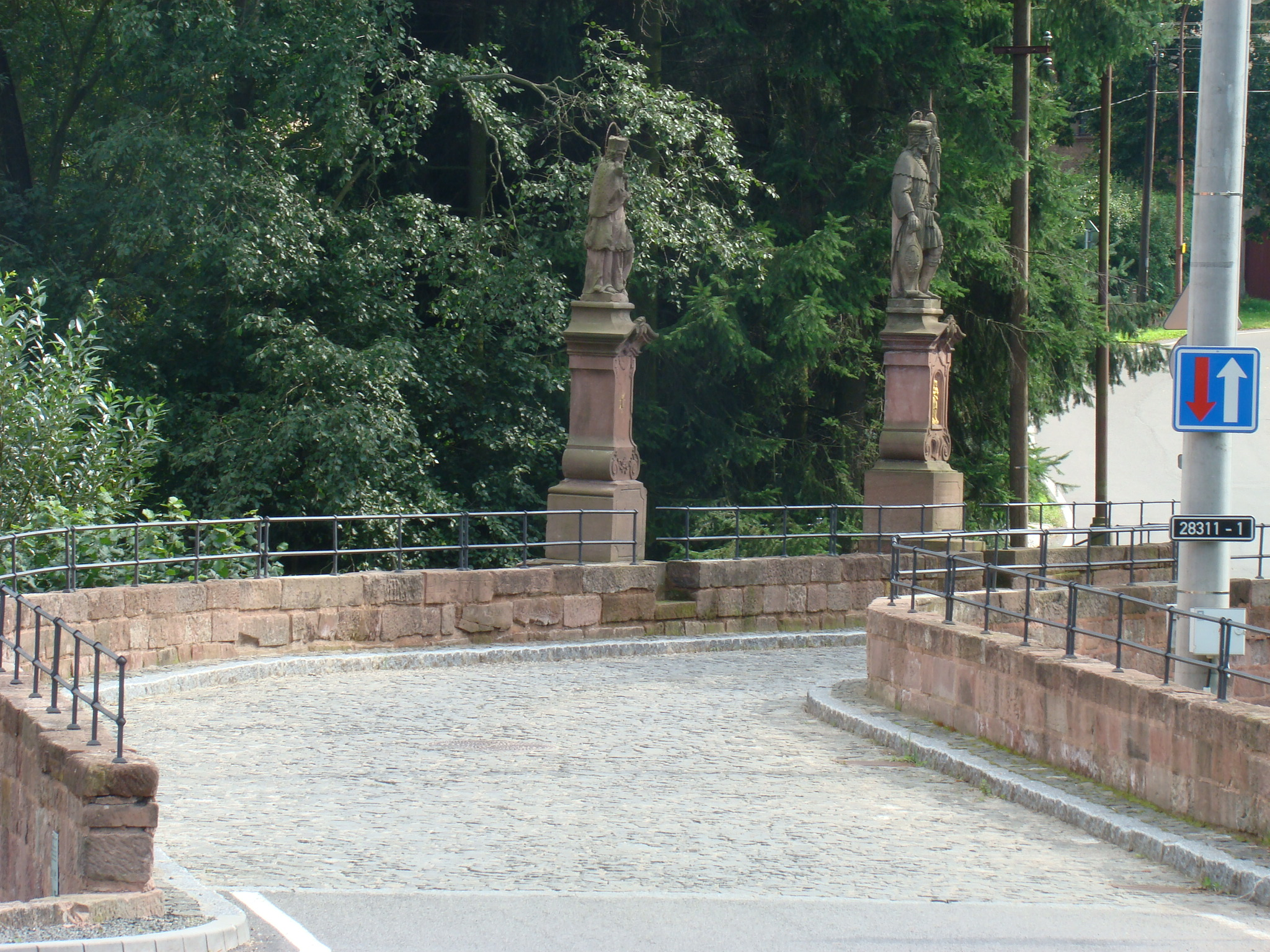
Stone bridge

A cultural monument is the former Evangelical prayer house. It was built in 1839–1842 and is a unique proof of renewal of the Evangelical community in the Czech lands. Next to the prayer house is a separate wooden bell tower.

A valuable three-arched stone bridge from 1822 spans the river Oleška. It is decorated with statues of Saints Wenceslaus and John of Nepomuk, which were created in 1851.
