= Magdalena Jetelová =

Czech installation artist and land artist

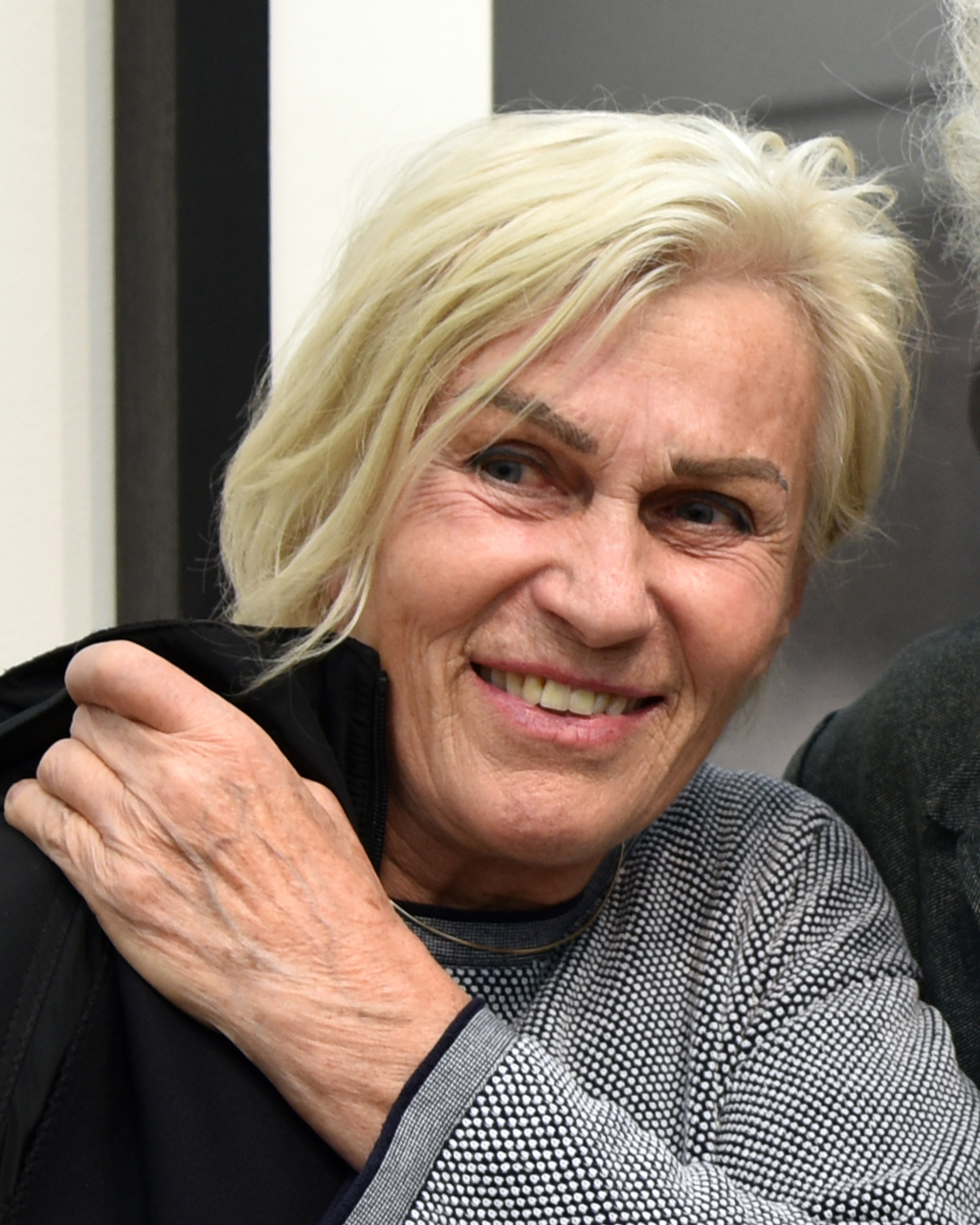
- Magdalena Jetelová (2025)
- Born: 4 June 1946; Semily, Czechoslovakia
- Education: Prague Academy of Fine Arts, Accademia di Belle Arti di Brera
- Website: jetelova.de

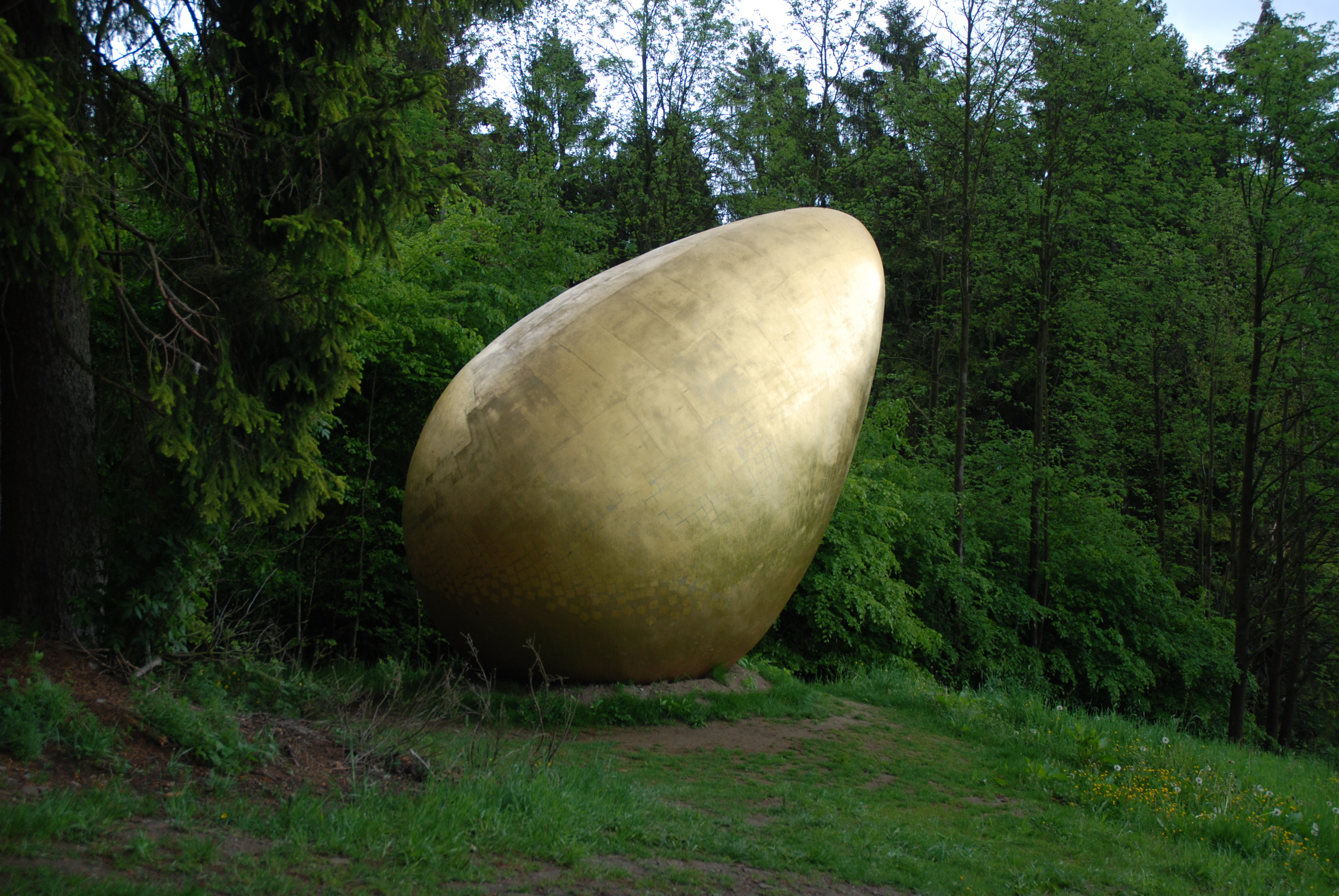
What Came First?, 2007–09, 21.3' x 13.1', Resin, steel, fiberglass inlay, concrete, and gold leaf.

Magdalena Jetelová (born 4 June 1946) is a Czech installation artist and land artist, who has achieved international acclaim. Known mainly for her environmental installation works, Jetelová combines light, architecture, photography, sculpture, and installation to explore the relationship between humans, objects, and space. Her work has been exhibited in various prominent galleries internationally such as Museu d'Art Contemporani de Barcelona, Tate Gallery London, Museum of Modern Art, 21er Haus, and the Martin-Gropius-Bau. Her work is also in the collection of Hirshhorn Museum, the Centre Pompidou, and the Museum Ludwig.

== Life and education ==
Jetelová was born in Semily in the former Czechoslovakia in 1946. She studied sculpture at the Prague Academy of Fine Arts from 1965–71, taking a break to briefly study abroad at the Brera Academy in Milan from 1967–68, where she worked under the Italian sculptor Marino Marini. She moved to Munich in the mid-1980's, where she participated in Documenta 8, a quinquennial contemporary art exhibition on display from 12 June 1987, through 20 September 1987, this time focusing on the sociopolitical responsibility of art from a post modern perspective. In 1988 Jetelová was a visiting professor at the Akademie der Bildende Künste (Academy of Fine Arts) in München, Germany. She then moved on to become a Professor Sommerakademie (International Summer Academy of Fine Arts) in Salzburg, Austria in 1989. From 1990–2004 Jetelová was a professor at the Staatliche Kunstakademie in Düsseldorf, Germany, and from 2004–2011 she was again a professor at the Akademie der Bildenden Künste in München, Germany. During that time, in 2008, she was also a visiting professor at the Academy of Fine Arts in Prague, Czech Republic. She is currently living in Munich, Düsseldorf, and Prague.

== Work ==
Her early work was significantly influenced by the Prague Spring, often dealing with themes of power and dominance in public spaces. Through the 1980s, she lived and worked in the Tichá Šárka district in Prague, working on pieces exploring social distress and spatial conflict, such as Marking by Red Smoke, Prague. She emigrated to West Germany in 1985, and her studio was destroyed. Later works include large-scale wooden sculptures of tables and chairs. Jetelová reproduces and often distorts simple everyday items in large wooden objects in order to explore ideas of regimentation of public space. An exhibit of hers for the Museum Kampa gained attention for floating down the Vltava river due to a flood and ending up near Mělník. Since 1986, she has experimented with outdoor light and laser projection.

Her iconic sculpture Place, commonly known as "The Giant's Chair", was installed at the Forest of Dean Sculpture Trail in 1986. The sculpture's creation was explained as: "not constructed on-site but made at the Sculpture Shed in Bristol, where the oak was delivered to and the joints constructed. The timber was then seasoned on-site in the forest for some six months before being erected using a 10 tonne crane to move the limbs, which each weighed around four tonnes." It was originally intended to last a short time before being set on fire, instead the artwork remained on its hilltop position for 29 years and was visited by millions of visitors from all over the world. It was finally removed in 2015, where the four tonnes logs were going to be converted into charcoal, an ancient tradition common to the Forest of Dean.

In her monumental 1992 installation Domestication of the Pyramid, she placed a pyramid made of red quartz sand inside the architecturally ornate Museum of Applied Arts, Vienna. In the next two years it was also installed in Dublin, Martin-Gropius-Bau, Berlin, Rottweil, and Warsaw. The red quartz sand takes over the museum space, piling over railings, stairways, and hallways, falling through the space in a way that feels like an avalanche. The work served as a visual metaphor for the Western tradition of taking important parts of our, and others, history and placing them inside of museums.

Her work What Came First? (2007–09) consists of a 21 foot tall golden egg perched on the edge of a forest. Made of resin, fiberglass, steel, and gold leafing set upon a concrete base, it represents life and its eternal cycle. The overwhelming size of the piece, joined by its reflective gold surface, make it feel as if it has been living in the trees since the dawn of time, a fitting size for the creatures that roamed the Earth before us. Simplified down to one common shape and one color, the egg begins to become a symbol of nature and Earth, a larger entity which sustains all life. Located on what is known as The Wood Sculpture Path, an artistic hiking train in the Siegerland-Wittgenstein district of Germany, visitors can walk through nature and enjoy outdoor sculptures such as Jetelová's.

In a more recent work, Jetelová can be seen exploring ideas of climate change, land art, light, and activism. A quote from her website regarding a recent exhibition, Pacific Ring of Fire (2019–20) at Walter Storms Galerie in Munich, Germany states, "The latest project of Czech artist Magdalena Jetelová (born 1946) ‘Pacific Ring of Fire’, as in her 1992 ‘Iceland Project’, revisits the theme of the natural, geological borders. at the point where the pacific plate meets several other continental plates, the pacific ring of fire surrounds the pacific plate in a horseshoe shape with a volcanic belt. In Patagonia, Jetelová uses mathematical calculations to mark the plate boundary with a laser beam, as clear elevations are not visible due to the eternal ice. Messages like ‘ESSENTIAL IS VISIBLE’ were written with a laser pointer on the changing, partly collapsing icebergs. The drastic geological changes caused by climate change clearly resound in these photographic images presented in large-format light boxes."

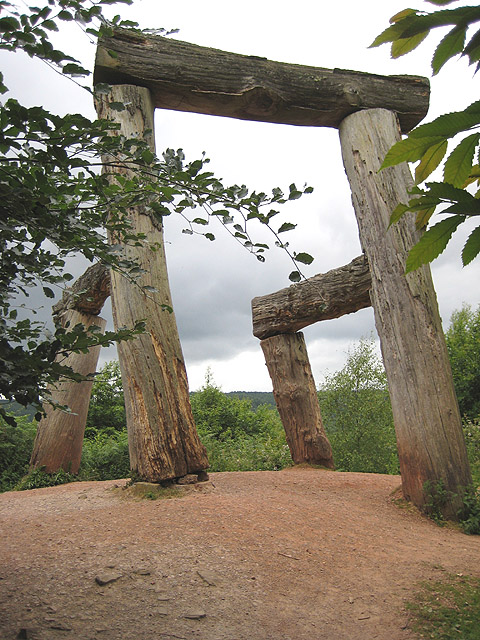
'Place' by Magdelena Jetelova was installed at The Forest of Dean Sculpture Trail in 1986.

== Exhibitions ==
Jetelová has been exhibiting her work since 1981 with her first exhibition in Prague. From there, she exhibited her work in The Chair In The 20th Century (1983) at the Museum of Decorative Arts in Prague, in Pictures and Sculptures (1982) at the Gong Culture House, Prague, and in the New Art Catalogue (1983) at the Tate Gallery, London, England. She exhibited her work in the Serpentine Gallery (1985), London England, in the Sixth Biennial of Sydney Catalogue (1986) in Sydney, Australia, and in Project Room (1987) at the Museum of Modern Art, New York City. From 1987–2000 Jetelová exhibited work in Vienna, New York, Antwerp, Chicago, Paris, Dublin, Berlin, Manchester, America, Prague, Budapest, Warsaw, Florence, London, Barcelona, Lisbon, Melbourne, and Munich, among other locations.

Between 2000–14 Jetelová has shown in Moscow at the National Centre for Contemporary Arts (2002), in Japan at the Echigo-tsumari Art Triennal (2003), in Korea at the Gwangju Biennale (2004), in Italy at the Villa Croce Museum of Contemporary Art (2005), in Denmark at the GL Strand (2007), in Berlin at the Akademie der Künste (2009), in Germany at the Kunsthalle Mannheim (2010), at the Venice Biennale (2011), in Prague at the Dox Center For Contemporary Art (2011), in Poland at the Wroclaw Contemporary Museum (2012), in Germany at the Kunstforum Ostdeutsche Galerie (2012), in New York at the Czech Center Weltreise (2013), in the Czech Republic at the Olomouc Museum of Art (2013), in Munich at the House of Art (2014), in Austria at the Gallery In Trakelhaus (2014), in Sweden at the International Art Project (2014).

Jetelová has an exponential list of exhibitions, going on to include, Pacific Ring of Fire (2020) held at Walter Storms Galerie in Munich, Germany, Essential is Visible (2019) at the German Society for Christian Art EV in Munich, Germany, The Big Sleep - 4th Biennale Of Artists (2019) at Haus der Kunst in Munich, Germany, Xxiv. Rohkunstbau 2018: Attention - Mind The Gap (2018), Lieberose Castle, Brandenburg, Germany, and Magdalena Jetelová - Touch Of Time (2017), National Gallery Prague. In 2016 she showed at the Galerie Du Jour Agnès B. in Paris, France and at the Taipei Museum in Taiwan, China. In 2015 at the Museum Würth, Künzelsau, Germany, the Winter Palace, Vienna, Austria, The Scenic Eye Italy, Città Di Castello, Italy, the Forest of Dean, Gloucestershire, England, and the Topographie Delʻart, Paris, France.
