= Semily =

Town in the Czech Republic

- Town
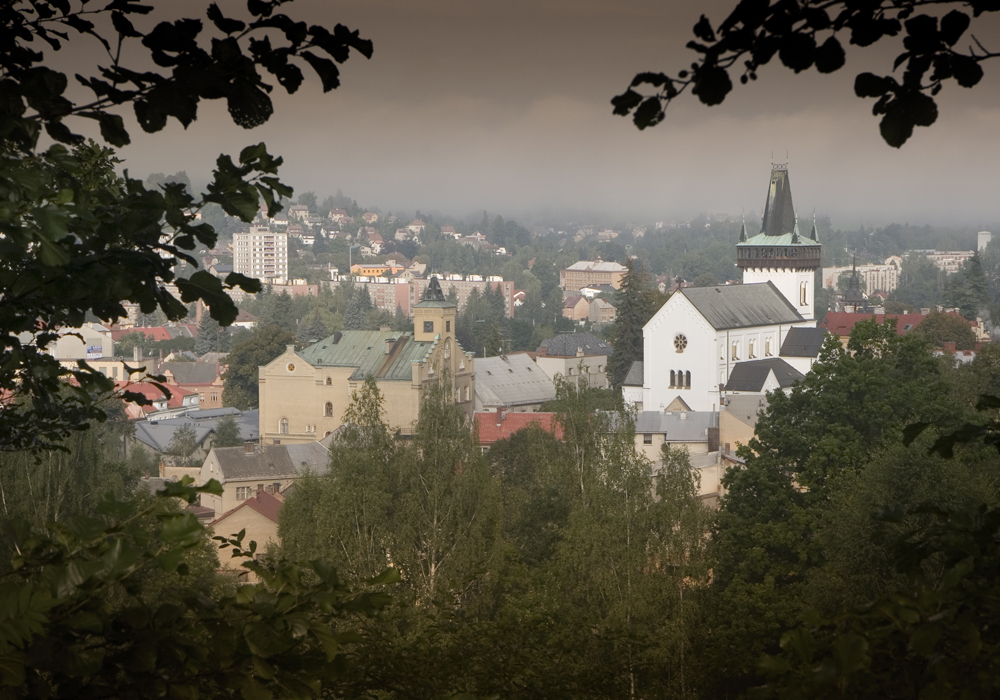
- View of the town

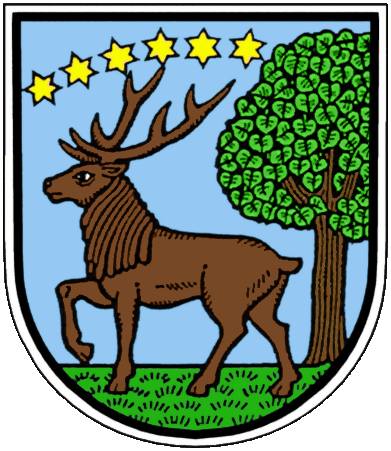
- Flag Coat of arms

- Location in the Czech Republic
- Coordinates: 50°36′7″N 15°20′8″E
- Country: Czech Republic
- Region: Liberec
- District: Semily
- First mentioned: 1352

Government
  - Mayor: David Pražák (Ind.)

Area
  - Total: 16.31 km^{2} (6.30 sq mi)
- Elevation: 340 m (1,120 ft)

Population (2026-01-01)
  - Total: 7,999
  - Density: 490.4/km^{2} (1,270/sq mi)
- Time zone: UTC+1 (CET)
  - Summer (DST): UTC+2 (CEST)
- Postal code: 513 01
- Website: www.semily.cz

Semily (Czech pronunciation: [ˈsɛmɪlɪ]; German: Semil) is a town in the Liberec Region of the Czech Republic. It has about 8,000 inhabitants. The town is located at the confluence of the Jizera and Oleška rivers, on the border between the Giant Mountains Foothills and Ještěd–Kozákov Ridge.

Semily became a town as a result of the industrialisation in the 19th century. The main landmark of the town is the Church of Saints Peter and Paul.

== Administrative division ==
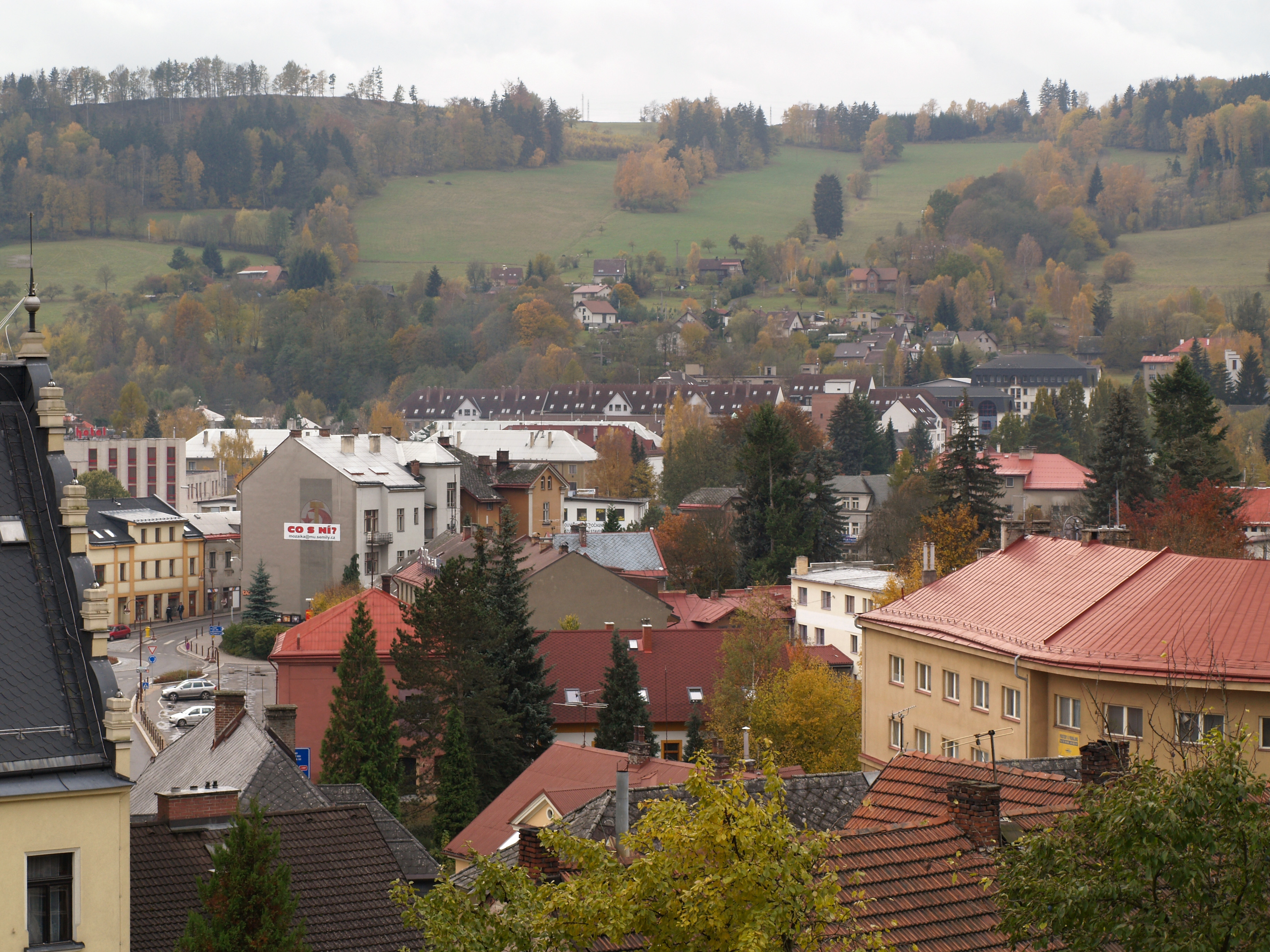
Podmoklice, a part of Semily

Semily consists of four municipal parts (in brackets population according to the 2021 census):

- Semily (2,554)
- Bítouchov (374)
- Podmoklice (4,989)
- Spálov (81)

== Etymology ==
The Old Czech word semil was the designation of a person who is nice. The name Semily therefore means "the settlement of nice people".

== Geography ==
Semily is located about 25 kilometres (16 mi) southeast of Liberec. Most of the municipal territory lies in the Giant Mountains Foothills, only in the southwest, it extends into the Ještěd–Kozákov Ridge. The highest point is the Medenec hill at 544 m (1,785 ft) above sea level. The town is situated at the confluence of the Jizera and Oleška rivers. The Kamenice River briefly flows along the northwestern municipal border and then joins the Jizera. The valley of the Jizera near Semily is protected as the Údolí Jizery Nature Reserve.

== History ==
The first written mention of Semily is from 1352, when existence of a church is mentioned. In the middle of the 19th century, the settlement transformed into a wealthy town when the industrialisation arrived and the development of rail transport occurred. Semily also profited from an advantageous location near the Jizera River.

== Demographics ==
Historical population

Year	Pop.	±%
1869	4,219	—
1880	5,186	+22.9%
1890	5,929	+14.3%
1900	6,305	+6.3%
1910	7,552	+19.8%

Year	Pop.	±%
1921	6,671	−11.7%
1930	7,396	+10.9%
1950	6,844	−7.5%
1961	7,081	+3.5%
1970	8,077	+14.1%

Year	Pop.	±%
1980	8,464	+4.8%
1991	9,399	+11.0%
2001	9,262	−1.5%
2011	8,452	−8.7%
2021	7,998	−5.4%

Source: Censuses

== Transport ==
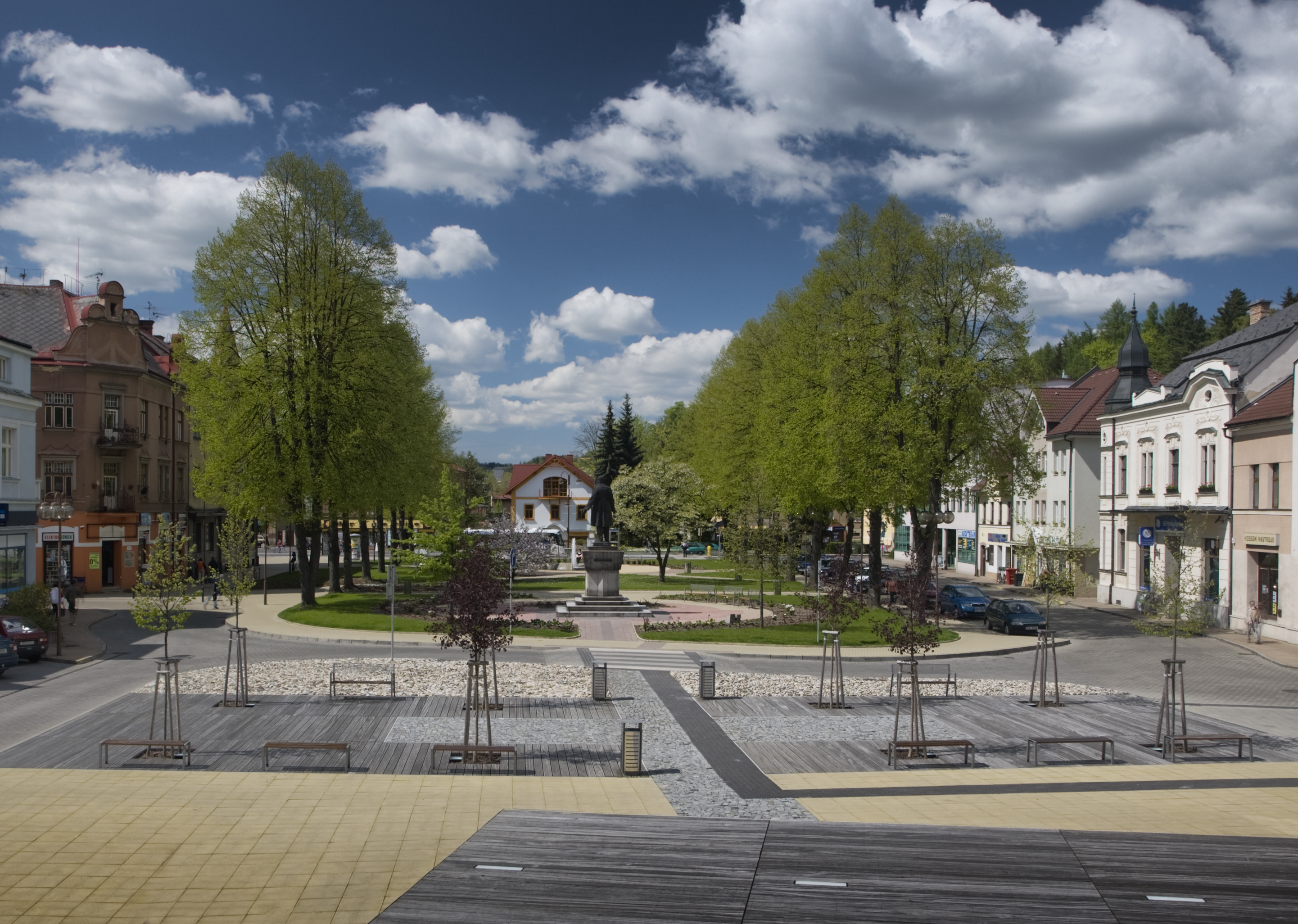
The square Riegrovo náměstí

Semily is located on the railway line Liberec–Pardubice.

== Sights ==
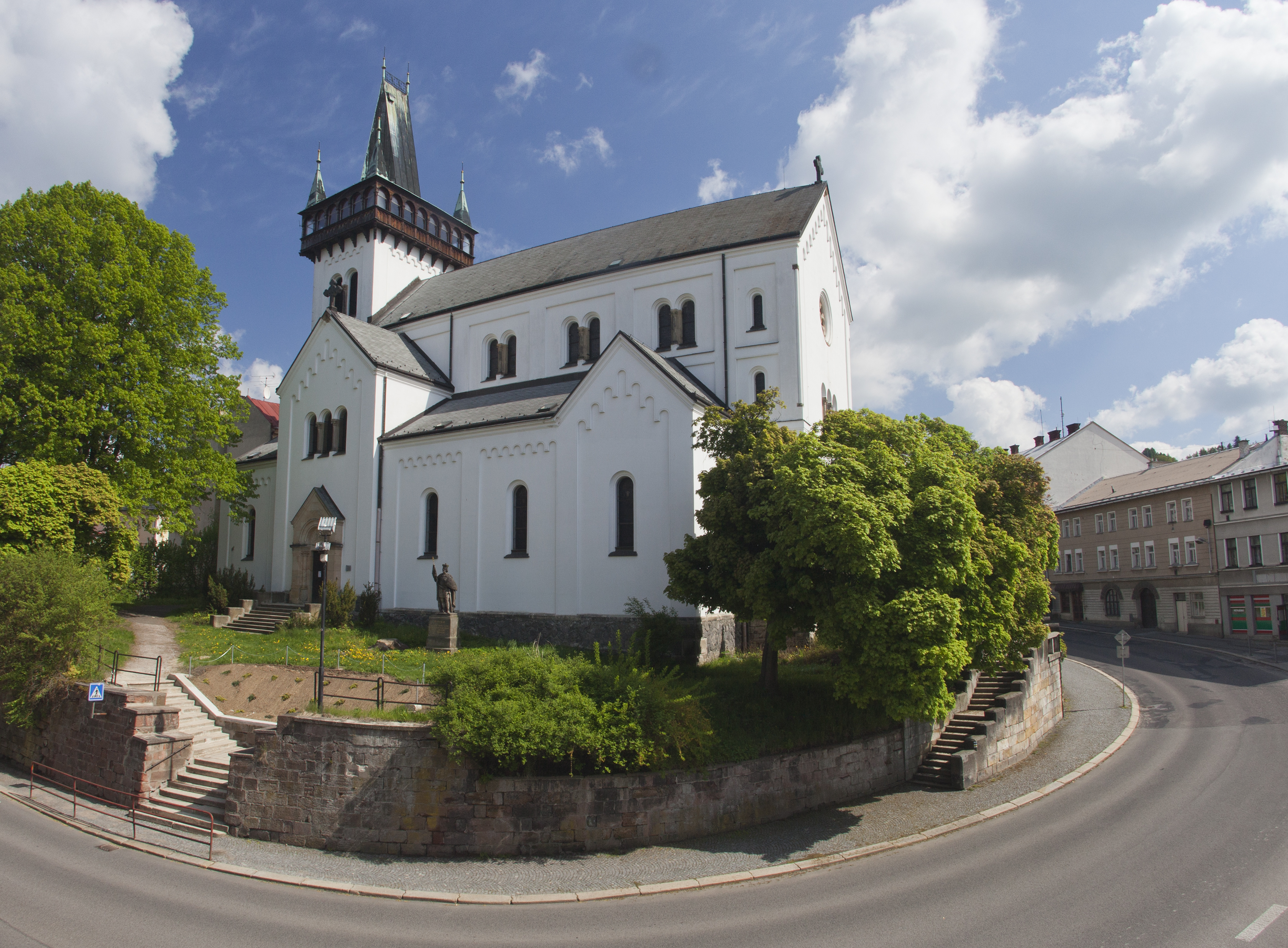
Church of Saints Peter and Paul

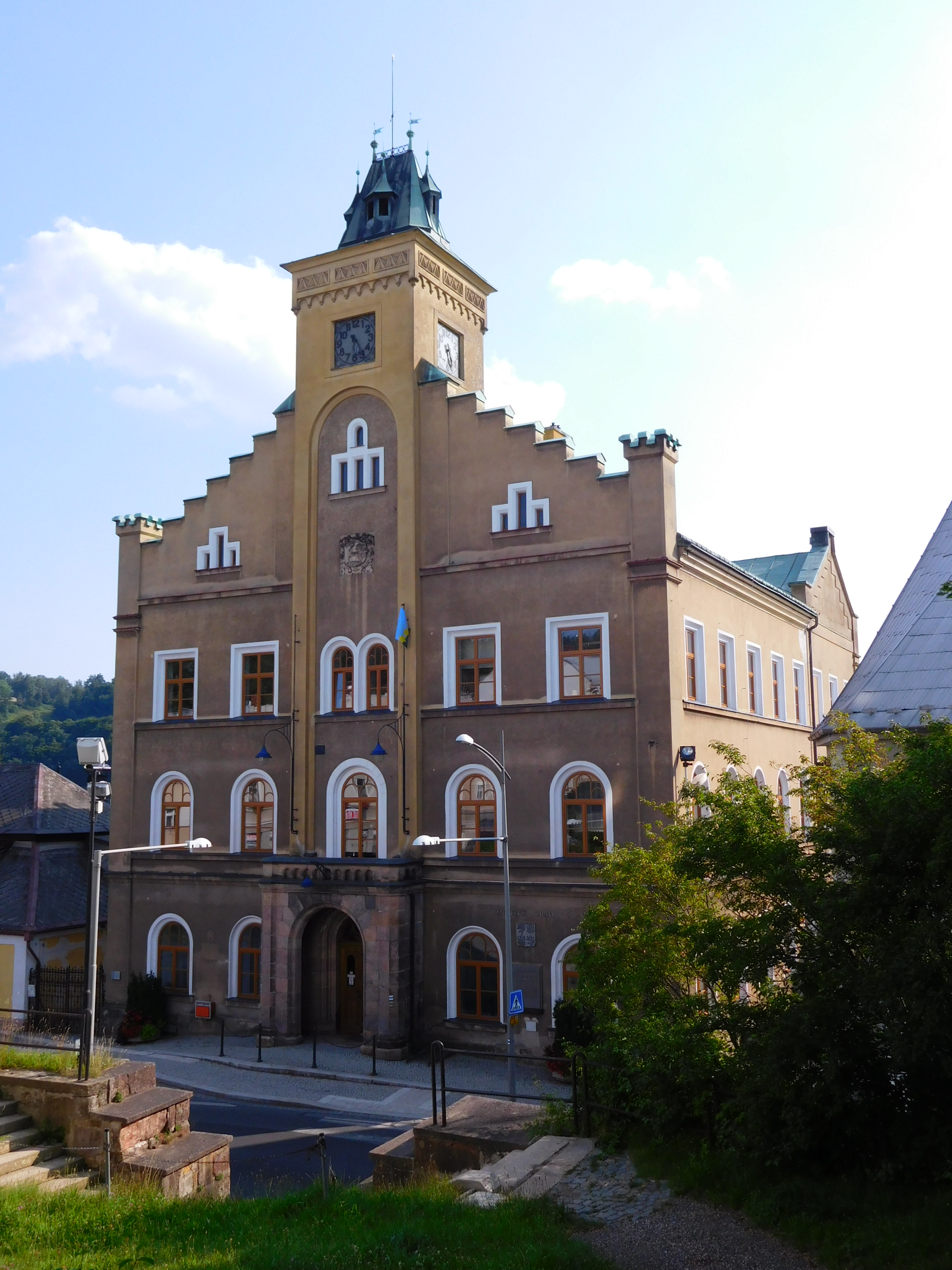
Town hall

The main landmark of Semily is the Church of Saints Peter and Paul. It was built in the Neo-Romanesque style in 1908–1911, after the old Baroque church from 1702 was torn down.

The Church of Saint John the Baptist was built in the Baroque style in 1723–1727. It is a valuable cemetery church.

Dr. Karel Farský prayer house was built for the Czechoslovak Hussite Church in 1938 and is considered one of the most valuable buildings of modern architecture in the region.

Obecní dům is a large Art Nouveau house built in 1906–1909, which forms a significant landmark in the historic centre of the town. The house is decorated with a mosaic by Jano Köhler.

The town hall dates from 1874. It replaced an old dilapidated wooden town hall from 1702.

The Museum and Regional Gallery is located in a historical one-floor house first documented in the early 17th century, where Antal Stašek worked and his son Ivan Olbracht was born. The museum and gallery has been located there since 1960.

== Notable people ==
- František Ladislav Rieger (1818–1903), politician
- Antal Stašek (1843–1931), writer and lawyer, lived and worked here in 1877–1913
- Bohumil Kučera (1874–1921), physicist
- Ivan Olbracht (1882–1952), writer
- Magdalena Jetelová (born 1946), artist

== Twin towns – sister cities ==
Semily is twinned with:

- Kolochava, Ukraine
- Schauenburg, Germany
