= Kucsera =

Kucsera is a surname, a Hungarized form of the surname Kučera. Notable people with the name include:

- Gábor Kucsera (canoeist) (born 1982), Hungarian sprint canoeist
- Gábor Kucsera (swimmer) (1949–2015), Hungarian swimmer
- Géza Kucsera (born 1948), Serbian politician
- Lukáš Kucsera (born 1991), Czech ice hockey player
- Mikuláš Kucsera (1902–1987), Slovak athlete
