= Košťálov =

- Municipality
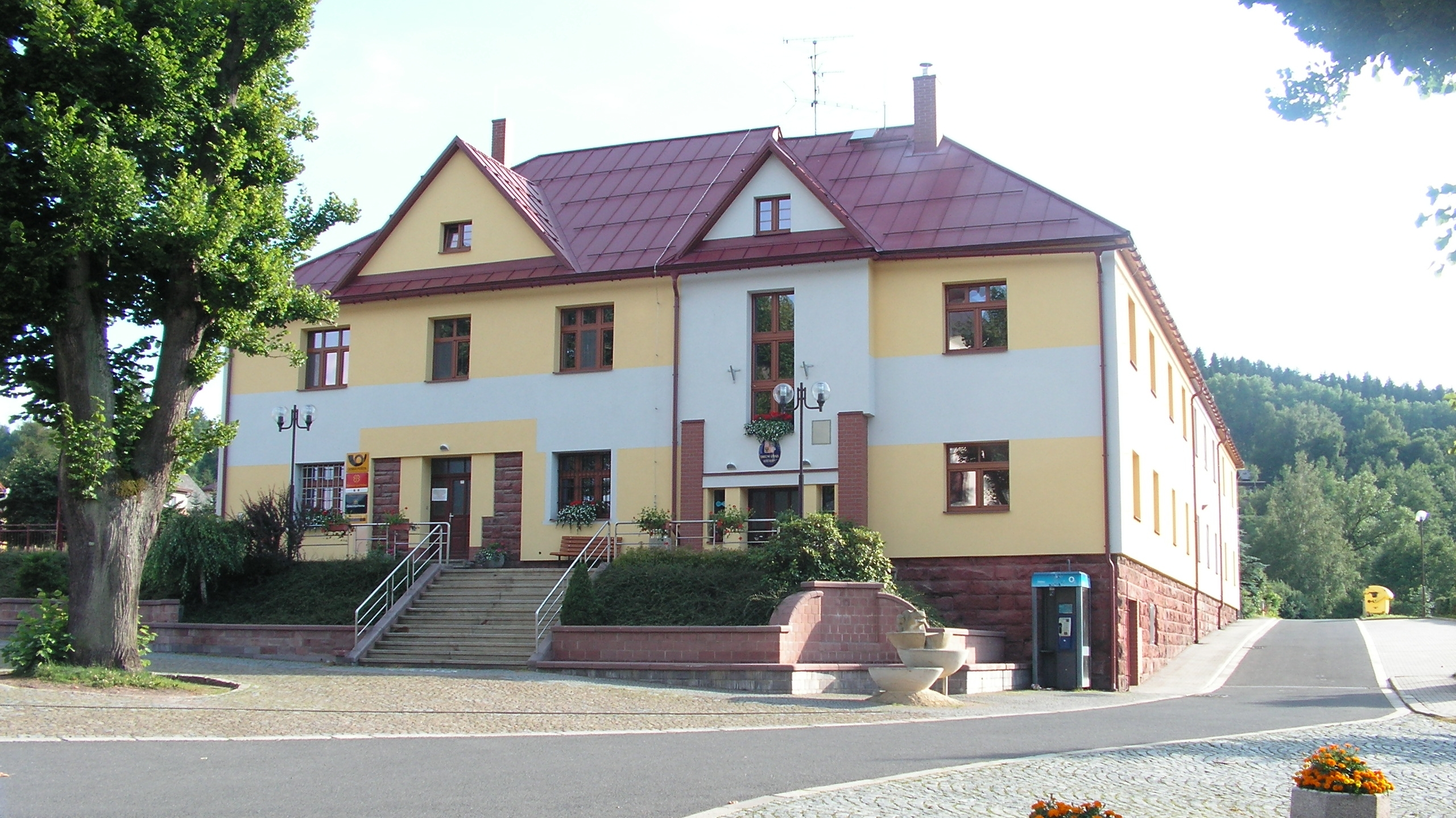
- Municipal office

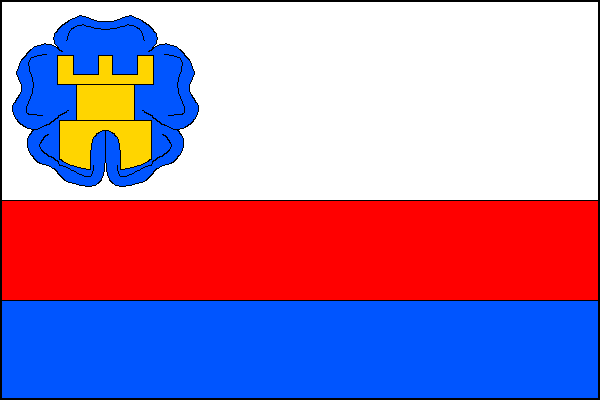
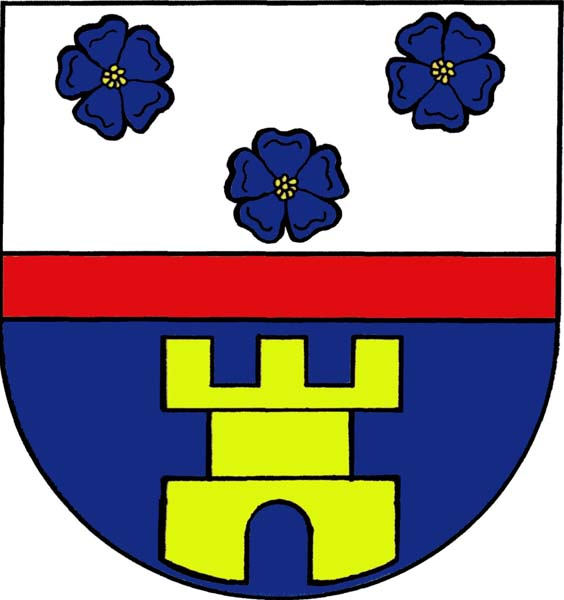
- Flag Coat of arms

- Location in the Czech Republic
- Coordinates: 50°34′18″N 15°24′15″E
- Country: Czech Republic
- Region: Liberec
- District: Semily
- First mentioned: 1361

Area
  - Total: 20.01 km^{2} (7.73 sq mi)
- Elevation: 359 m (1,178 ft)

Population (2026-01-01)
  - Total: 1,672
  - Density: 83.56/km^{2} (216.4/sq mi)
- Time zone: UTC+1 (CET)
  - Summer (DST): UTC+2 (CEST)
- Postal codes: 512 02, 512 51, 514 01
- Website: www.kostalov.cz

Košťálov is a municipality and village in Semily District in the Liberec Region of the Czech Republic. It has about 1,700 inhabitants.

== Administrative division ==
Košťálov consists of four municipal parts (in brackets population according to the 2021 census):

- Košťálov (1,207)
- Čikvásky (43)
- Kundratice (323)
- Valdice (17)

== Demographics ==
Historical population
Year	Pop.	±%
1869	2,001	—
1880	2,030	+1.4%
1890	2,000	−1.5%
1900	2,136	+6.8%
1910	2,442	+14.3%
1921	2,136	−12.5%
1930	2,384	+11.6%
1950	1,927	−19.2%
1961	1,861	−3.4%
1970	1,985	+6.7%
1980	1,795	−9.6%
1991	1,617	−9.9%
2001	1,661	+2.7%
2011	1,621	−2.4%
2021	1,590	−1.9%
Source: Censuses
