= Martin Kučera (ice hockey) =

Slovak ice hockey player

- Born: May 25, 1978 (age 47) Bratislava, Czechoslovakia
- Height: 6 ft 0 in (183 cm)
- Weight: 185 lb (84 kg; 13 st 3 lb)
- Position: Goaltender
- Caught: Left
- Played for: HC Slovan Bratislava; MHk 32 Liptovský Mikuláš; HK 36 Skalica; Edinburgh Capitals; MsHK Žilina
- Playing career: 1996–2009

Martin Kučera (born May 25, 1978) is a Slovak former ice hockey goaltender.

== Early life ==
Kučera was born in Bratislava. He played in the 1998 World Junior Ice Hockey Championships for Slovakia.

== Career ==
Kučera played in the Tipsport Liga for HC Slovan Bratislava, MHk 32 Liptovský Mikuláš, HK 36 Skalica and MsHK Žilina. He also played one season in the Elite Ice Hockey League for the Edinburgh Capitals, joining the team in 2005.
