= Eugen Kutschera =

Austro-Hungarian conductor

Eugen Kutschera (10 January 1852 – 9 February 1918) was a composer, conductor, teacher and music director from Austria-Hungary.

== Life ==
Born in Brno, Kutschera graduated from the grammar school in his home town and studied music at the conservatory in Prague. After his studies Kutschera travelled to Linz, Brno, Graz, Danzig, Vienna and Basel as Kapellmeister, until he finally took up a permanent position at the teacher's seminar in Aarau in 1892 as music director. Kutschera took over a position as a piano teacher for the time being and worked as a singing teacher from 1905. He remained active in these positions in Aarau for the last 25 years of his life.

Besides his work as a teacher Kutschera composed several works, but without financial success. He contributed pieces to the Centenary celebrations of the Canton of Aargau and was conductor of the Aarau Cecilia Society. He also wrote musical articles in the Neue Zürcher Zeitung.

Kutschera died unexpectedly on 9 February 1918 in Aarau of a stroke at age 66.

== Work ==
- Ein junger Mönch im Kloster Heisterbach (1898), for mixed choir.
- Music for the "Aargauische Centenarfeier" festival for the celebration of the centenary in 1903; text by Gottlieb Fischer.
- Die Schlacht am Stoss (1905) Appenzell Festival for the celebration of the centenary in 1905; text by Georg Baumberger.
- Music for Arnold von Melchthal (1907), festive drama for the Federal Gymnastics Festival. Text by Gottlieb Fischer.
