= Lore Kutschera =

Austrian botanist (1917-2008)

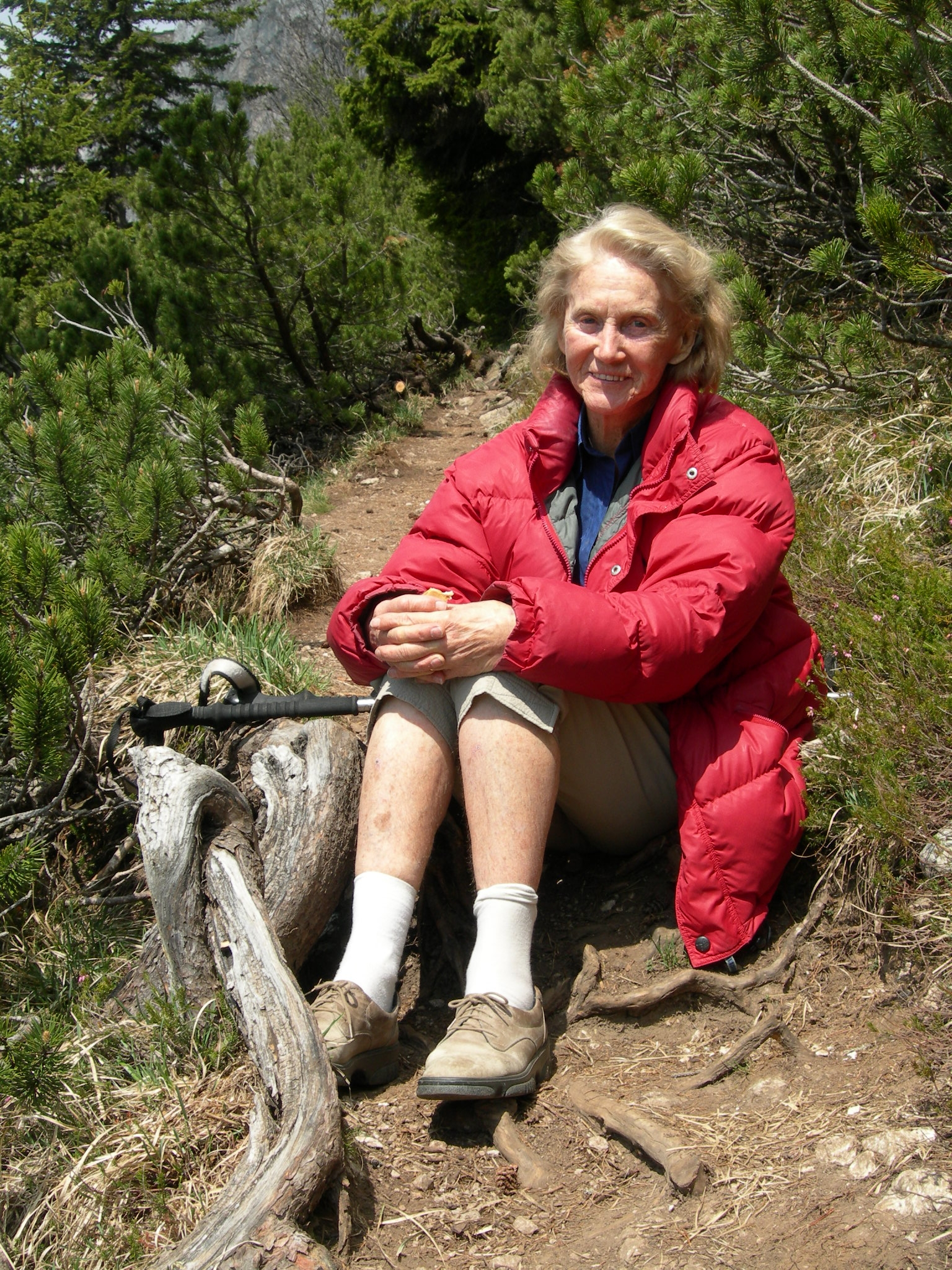
- Born: September 17, 1917; Villach
- Died: October 16, 2008 (aged 91); Klagenfurt

Dr. Lore Kutschera (b. 14 September 1917, Villach, d. 16 October 2008, Klagenfurt) was an Austrian botanist, ecologist, phytosociologist, and educator known for her research of plant root systems and phytosociology in agricultural contexts. In 1962 she received her doctorate at the University of Natural Resources and Life Sciences, Vienna, and later in life received several state awards form Klagenfurt for her scientific achievements. In 1982, she founded the International Society of Root Research.
