= Stará Paka =

- Municipality
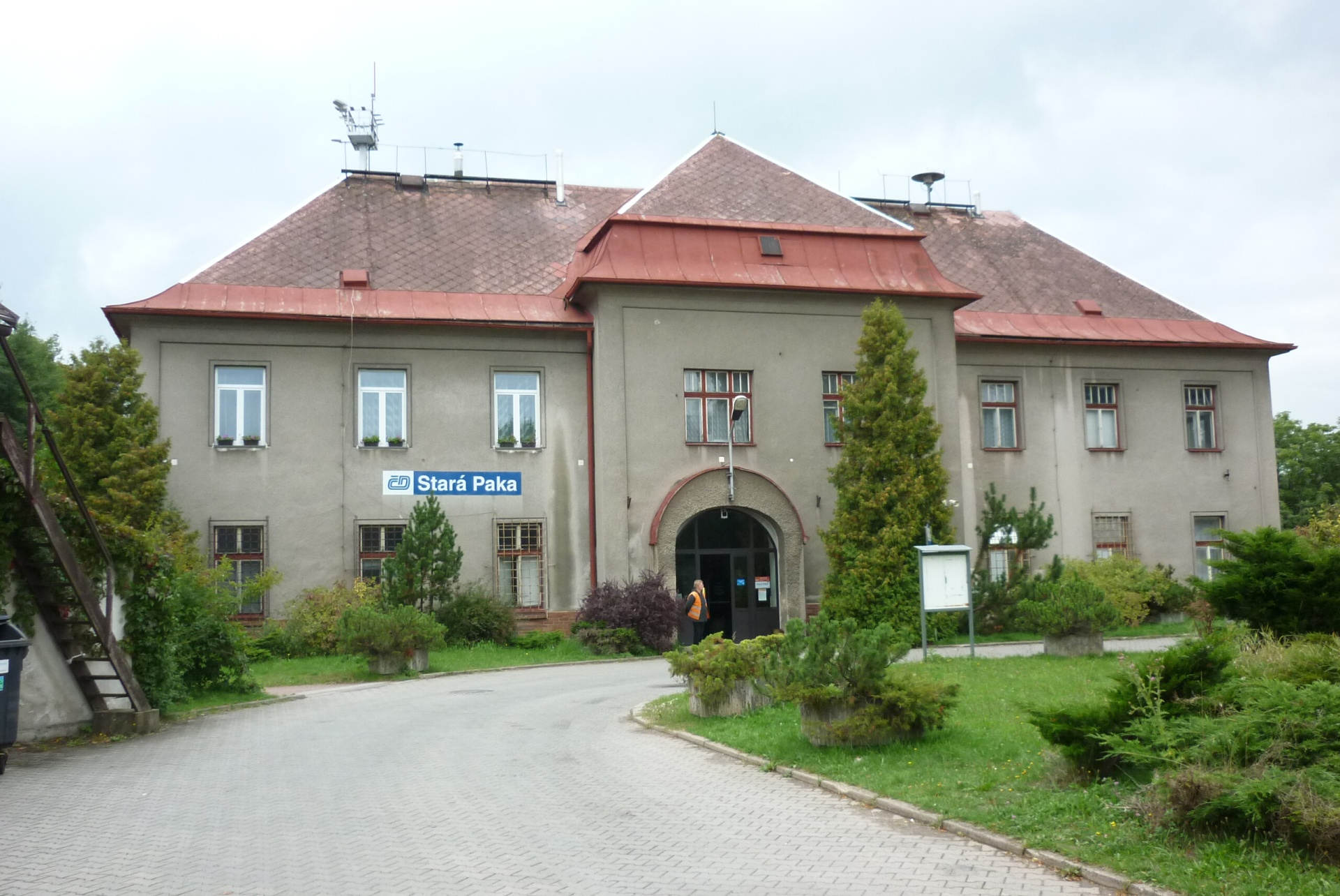
- Train station

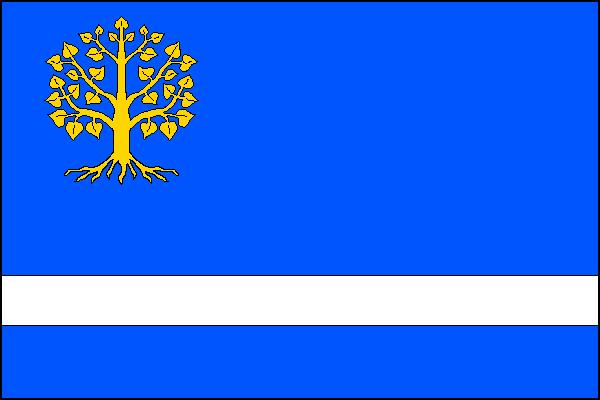
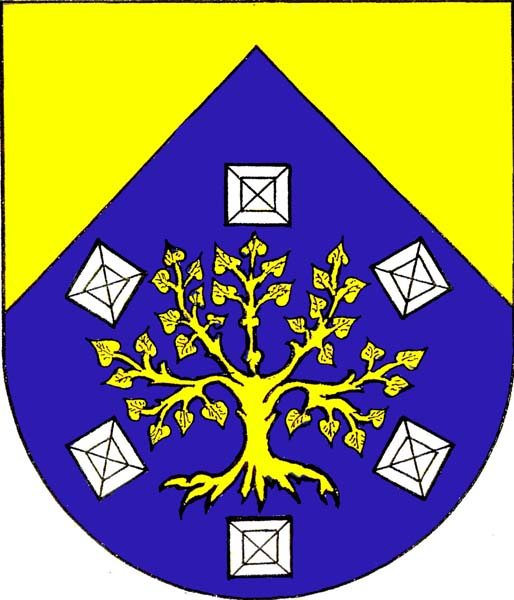
- Flag Coat of arms

- Location in the Czech Republic
- Coordinates: 50°30′30″N 15°29′38″E
- Country: Czech Republic
- Region: Hradec Králové
- District: Jičín
- First mentioned: 1357

Area
  - Total: 21.71 km^{2} (8.38 sq mi)
- Elevation: 407 m (1,335 ft)

Population (2026-01-01)
  - Total: 2,142
  - Density: 98.66/km^{2} (255.5/sq mi)
- Time zone: UTC+1 (CET)
  - Summer (DST): UTC+2 (CEST)
- Postal codes: 507 91, 509 01
- Website: www.starapaka.cz

Stará Paka is a municipality and village in Jičín District in the Hradec Králové Region of the Czech Republic. It has about 2,100 inhabitants.

== Administrative division ==
Stará Paka consists of six municipal parts (in brackets population according to the 2021 census):

- Stará Paka (1,436)
- Brdo (129)
- Karlov (55)
- Krsmol (34)
- Roškopov (162)
- Ústí (172)

== Etymology ==
The name Paka appeared in its initial form as Paká. The meaning of the adjective paká is unclear. It probably meant 'opposite' (opačná in modern Czech), and probably referred to its location on the shady slopes, away from the sun. Already from the 14th century, two settlements (Stará Paka – 'old Paka' and Nová Paka – 'new Paka') were distinguished.

== Geography ==
Stará Paka is located about 12 kilometres (7 mi) northeast of Hradec Králové and 40 km (25 mi) northwest of Hradec Králové. It lies in a hilly landscape of the Giant Mountains Foothills. The highest point is the hill Staropacká hora at 578 m (1,896 ft) above sea level. The Oleška River flows through the municipality.

== History ==
The first written mention of Stará Paka is from 1357. Little is known about its past. Together with the neighbouring town of Nová Paka, it belonged to the Kumburk estate.

== Demographics ==
Historical population

Year	Pop.	±%
1869	3,398	—
1880	3,485	+2.6%
1890	3,701	+6.2%
1900	3,941	+6.5%
1910	4,449	+12.9%

Year	Pop.	±%
1921	4,188	−5.9%
1930	3,934	−6.1%
1950	2,924	−25.7%
1961	2,953	+1.0%
1970	2,686	−9.0%

Year	Pop.	±%
1980	2,549	−5.1%
1991	2,127	−16.6%
2001	2,024	−4.8%
2011	2,013	−0.5%
2021	1,988	−1.2%

Source: Censuses

== Transport ==
Stará Paka is located on the railway lines Liberec–Pardubice and Kolín–Trutnov.

== Sights ==
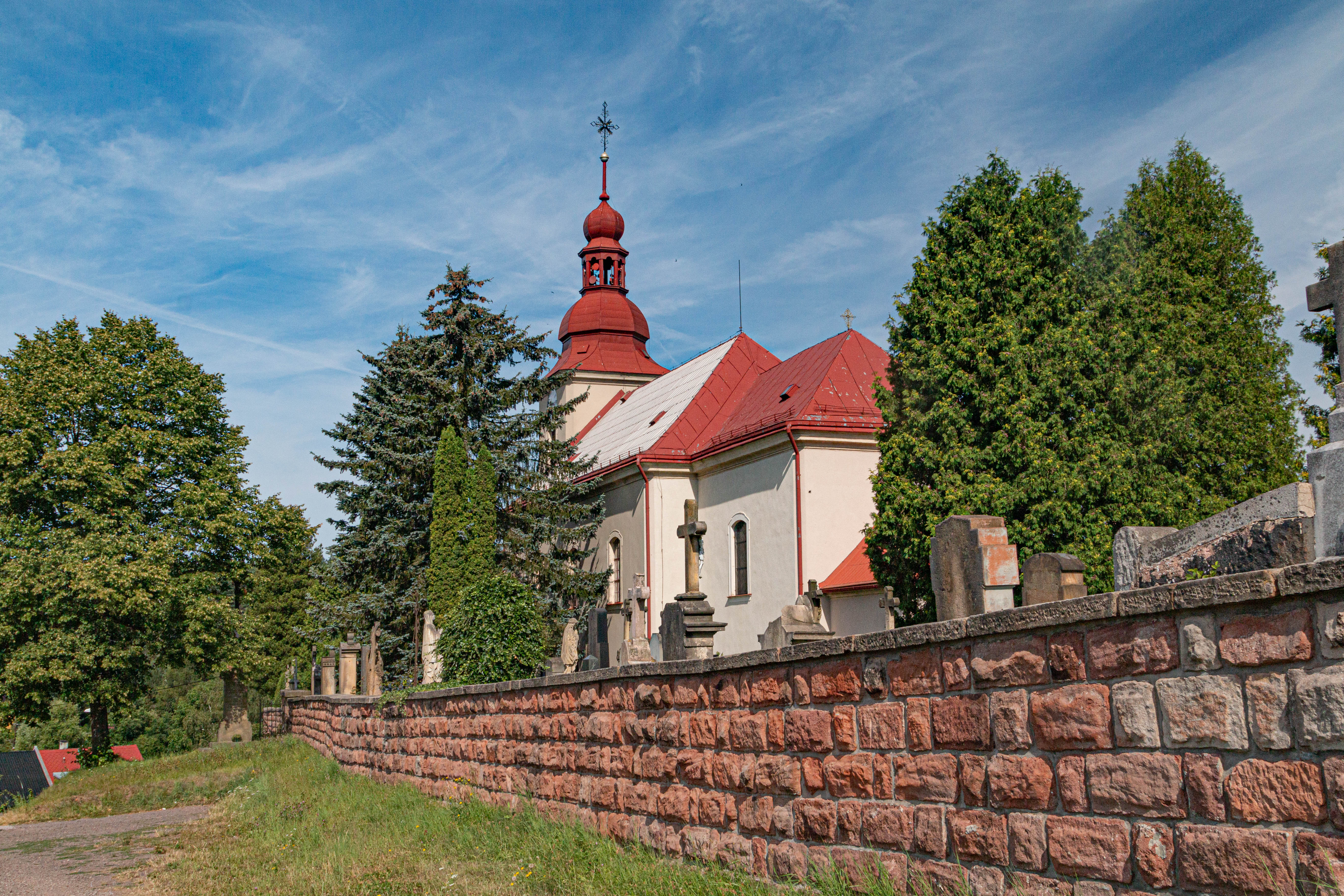
Church of Saint Lawrence

The main landmark of Stará Paka is the Church of Saint Lawrence. It was built in the Baroque style in 1754–1760, on the site of an older wooden church.

For its preserved folk architecture, the almost entire village of Karlov is protected as a village monument zone. It consists of half-timbered houses from the turn of the 18th and 19th centuries with very decorative wooden gables called lomenice.
