= Marcel Kučera =

Czech ice hockey goaltender

- Born: 17 June 1971 (age 54)
- Height: 6 ft 4 in (193 cm)
- Weight: 187 lb (85 kg; 13 st 5 lb)
- Position: Goaltender
- Caught: Left
- Played for: HC Kladno; HC Karlovy Vary; Odense Bulldogs; Lillehammer IK
- Playing career: 1988–2004

Marcel Kučera (born 17 June 1971) is a Czech former professional ice hockey goaltender.

Kučera played four games in the Czechoslovak First Ice Hockey League for HC Kladno and 33 games in the Czech Extraliga for HC Karlovy Vary. He also played in the Codan Ligaen for the Odense Bulldogs and the Eliteserien for Lillehammer IK.
