= Jan Kudrna =

Czech ice hockey defenceman

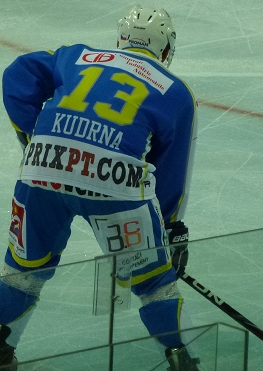
- Jan Kudrna during a live match
- Born: July 1, 1975 (age 50)
- Height: 5 ft 11 in (180 cm)
- Weight: 192 lb (87 kg; 13 st 10 lb)
- Position: Defence
- Shot: Right
- Played for: HC Bílí Tygři Liberec; HC Karlovy Vary; HC Oceláři Třinec; MsHK Žilina; HK Nitra; Rapaces de Gap
- Playing career: 1994–2015

Jan Kudrna (born July 1, 1975) is a Czech former professional ice hockey defenceman.

Kudrna played in the Czech Extraliga for HC Bílí Tygři Liberec, HC Karlovy Vary and HC Oceláři Třinec. He also played in the Tipsport Liga for MsHK Žilina and HK Nitra and in the Ligue Magnus for Rapaces de Gap.

Kudrna began and ended his career with IHC Písek and later became an assistant coach for the team after his retirement.
