= Bohumil Kučera =

Czech physicist (1874–1921)

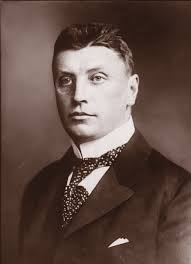

Bohumil Kučera (22 March 1874 – 16 April 1921) was a Czech physicist.

== Biography ==
Kučera was born on 22 March 1874 in Semily. He studied physics at the Charles University in Prague and was the first scientist in the Czech lands to examine the newly discovered effect of radioactivity. In 1912, he became professor of experimental physics at the university. He was the first to study droplets of mercury used as electrode (author of Zur Oberflächenspannung von polarisiertem Quecksilber, 1903). His work was the basis for the discovery of polarography by Jaroslav Heyrovský.

Kučera died prematurely due to his bohemian lifestyle. He died on 16 April 1921 in Prague, at the age of 47. He is buried at the Olšany Cemetery in Prague.
