= Lomnice nad Popelkou =

- Town
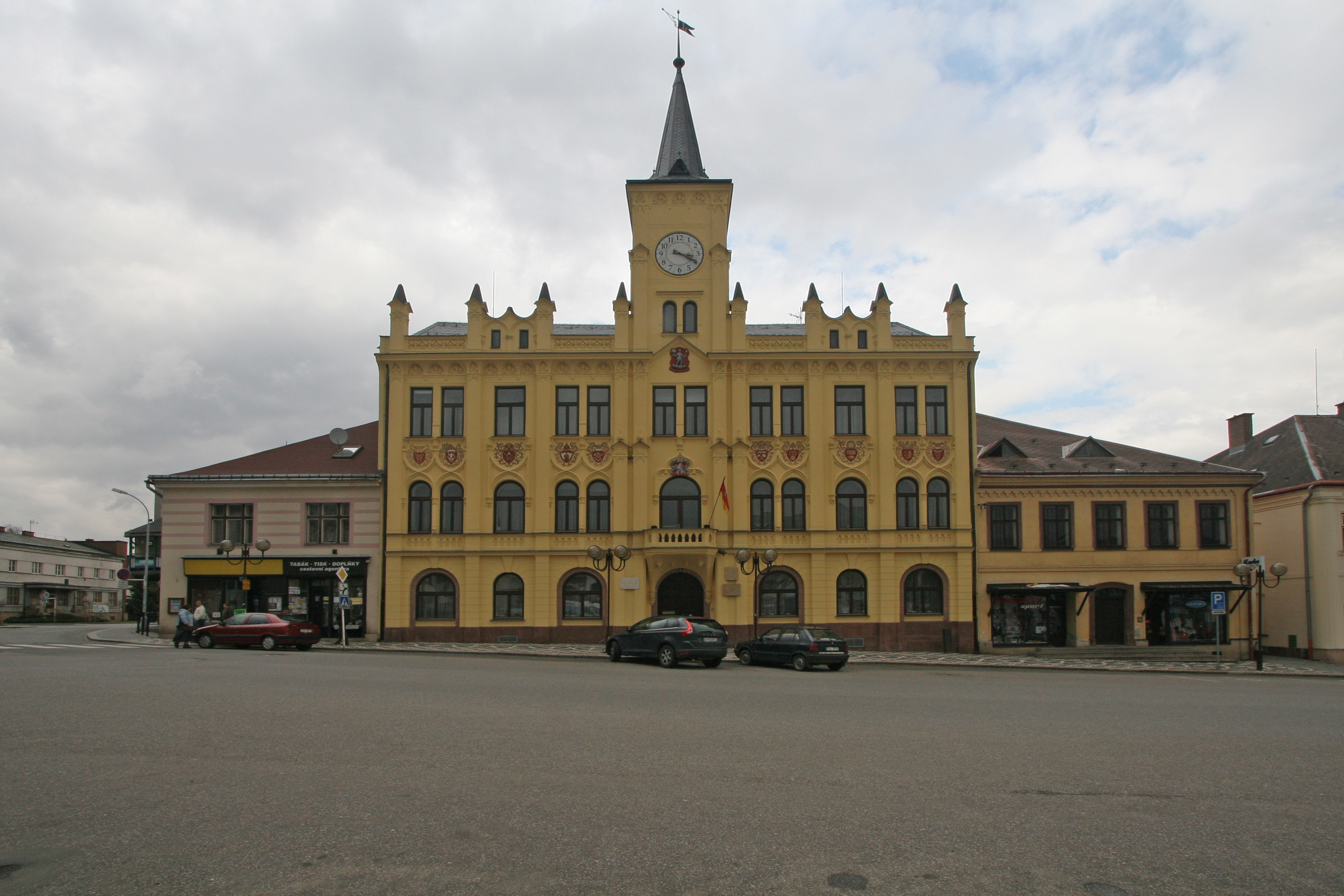
- Town hall on the square Husovo náměstí

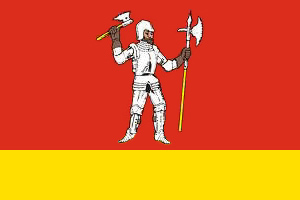
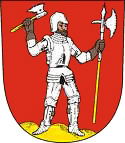
- Flag Coat of arms

- Location in the Czech Republic
- Coordinates: 50°31′50″N 15°22′25″E
- Country: Czech Republic
- Region: Liberec
- District: Semily
- First mentioned: 1242

Government
  - Mayor: Josef Šimek

Area
  - Total: 25.57 km^{2} (9.87 sq mi)
- Elevation: 478 m (1,568 ft)

Population (2026-01-01)
  - Total: 5,649
  - Density: 220.9/km^{2} (572.2/sq mi)
- Time zone: UTC+1 (CET)
  - Summer (DST): UTC+2 (CEST)
- Postal codes: 512 51, 512 63
- Website: lomnicenadpopelkou.cz

Lomnice nad Popelkou (Czech pronunciation: [ˈlomɲɪtsɛ ˈnat popɛlkou]; German: Lomnitz an der Popelka) is a town in Semily District in the Liberec Region of the Czech Republic. It has about 5,600 inhabitants. The town is located on the Popelka Stream, on the border between the Giant Mountains Foothills and Ještěd–Kozákov Ridge.

The historic town centre is well preserved and is protected as an urban monument zone. The locality of Karlov is protected as a village monument reservation.

== Administrative division ==
Lomnice nad Popelkou consists of 12 municipal parts (in brackets population according to the 2021 census):

- Lomnice nad Popelkou (4,958)
- Černá (70)
- Chlum (49)
- Dráčov (24)
- Košov (61)
- Morcinov (15)
- Nové Dvory (60)
- Ploužnice (47)
- Rváčov (52)
- Skuhrov (21)
- Tikov (6)
- Želechy (52)

== Etymology ==
The name of the town is derived from the local stream, which used to be called Lomnice. The stream's name was derived from the Czech adjective lomný, which could mean 'noisy' or 'crooked'.

== Geography ==
Lomnice nad Popelkou is located about 33 kilometres (21 mi) southeast of Liberec. It lies on the border between the Giant Mountains Foothills and Ještěd–Kozákov Ridge. The highest point is the mountain Tábor at 678 m (2,224 ft) above sea level. The town is situated on the Popelka Stream. The Cidlina River originates in the southern part of the municipal territory.

== History ==
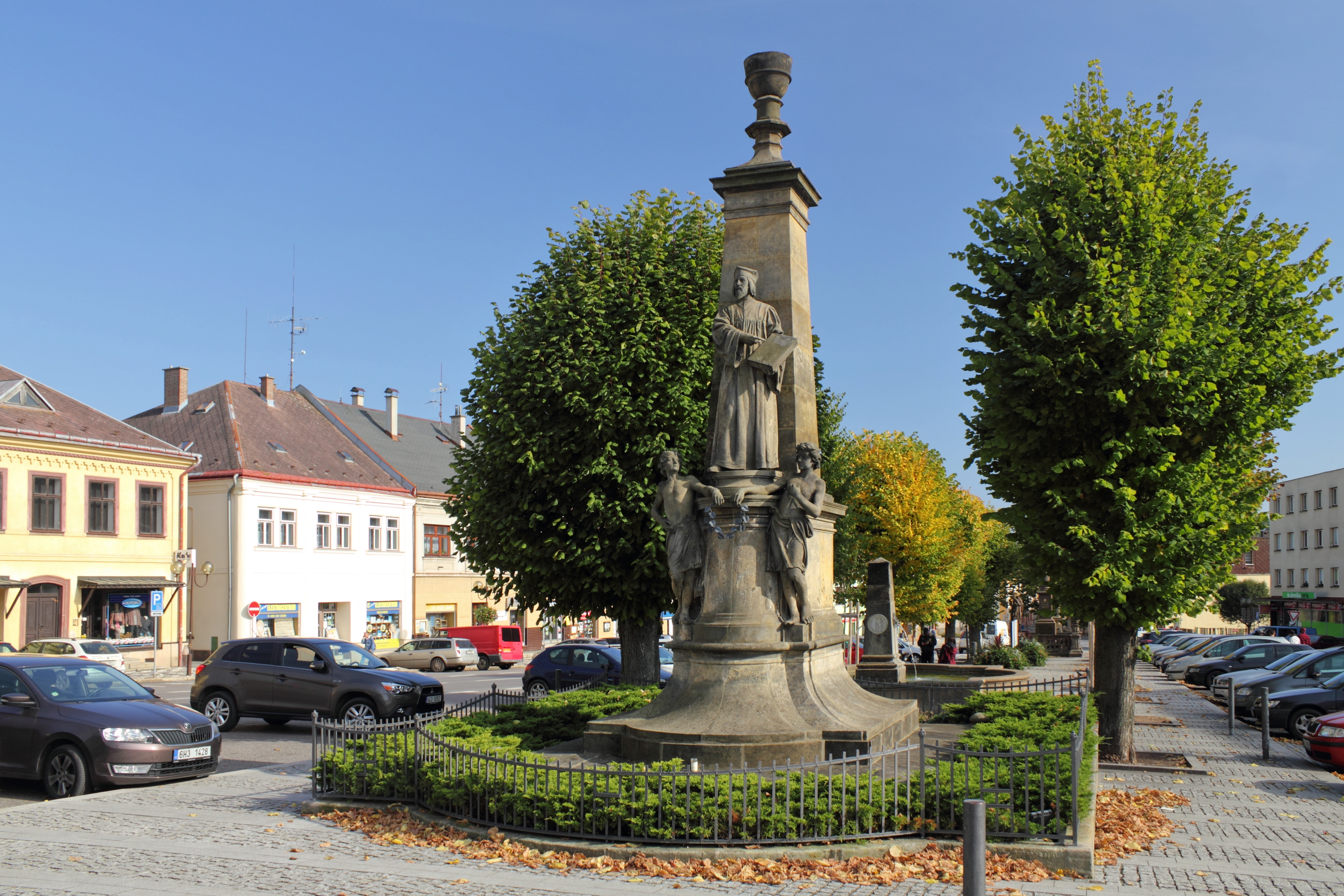
Monument of Jan Hus on Husovo náměstí

The first written mention of Lomnice nad Popelkou, written between 1308 and 1314, is in Chronicle of Dalimil, where there is written about the origin of the town's coat of arms in 1242. Due to the harsh climatic conditions, Lomnice area was colonised at the turn of the 12th and 13th centuries. The first documented owner was Albrecht of Waldstein in 1308. The Waldstein family owned Lomnice until the end of the 14th century. In that time Lomnice was already referred to as a town and was acquired by the Knights of Košík.

After the Hussite Wars, Lomnice often changed owners, which lasted until 1524. From 1524 to 1654, the town was owned again by the Waldstein family and experienced a time of greatest prosperity and development. The development stopped because of the Thirty Years' War. In 1654, Lomnice was bought by the Counts of Morzin. They owned the estate until 1796. In 1796–1834, the town was a property of Ignác Falge, a rich merchant. The last aristocratic owners of the estate were the Counts of Rohan.

== Demographics ==
Historical population

Year	Pop.	±%
1869	5,981	—
1880	5,810	−2.9%
1890	5,650	−2.8%
1900	5,652	+0.0%
1910	6,378	+12.8%

Year	Pop.	±%
1921	5,966	−6.5%
1930	6,879	+15.3%
1950	5,958	−13.4%
1961	5,969	+0.2%
1970	5,814	−2.6%

Year	Pop.	±%
1980	6,137	+5.6%
1991	6,328	+3.1%
2001	6,135	−3.0%
2011	5,648	−7.9%
2021	5,415	−4.1%

Source: Censuses

== Economy ==
The largest employer based in the town is Samohýl group a.s., engaged in the wholesale and distribution of veterinary drugs and products, and pet food and pet accessories.

== Transport ==
Lomnice nad Popelkou is the starting point of the railway lines to Městec Králové and Stará Paka.

== Sport ==
The town is known for the ski club LSK Lomnice nad Popelkou, represented by ski jumpers such as Roman Koudelka and Čestmír Kožíšek. The club was founded in 1925.

== Sights ==
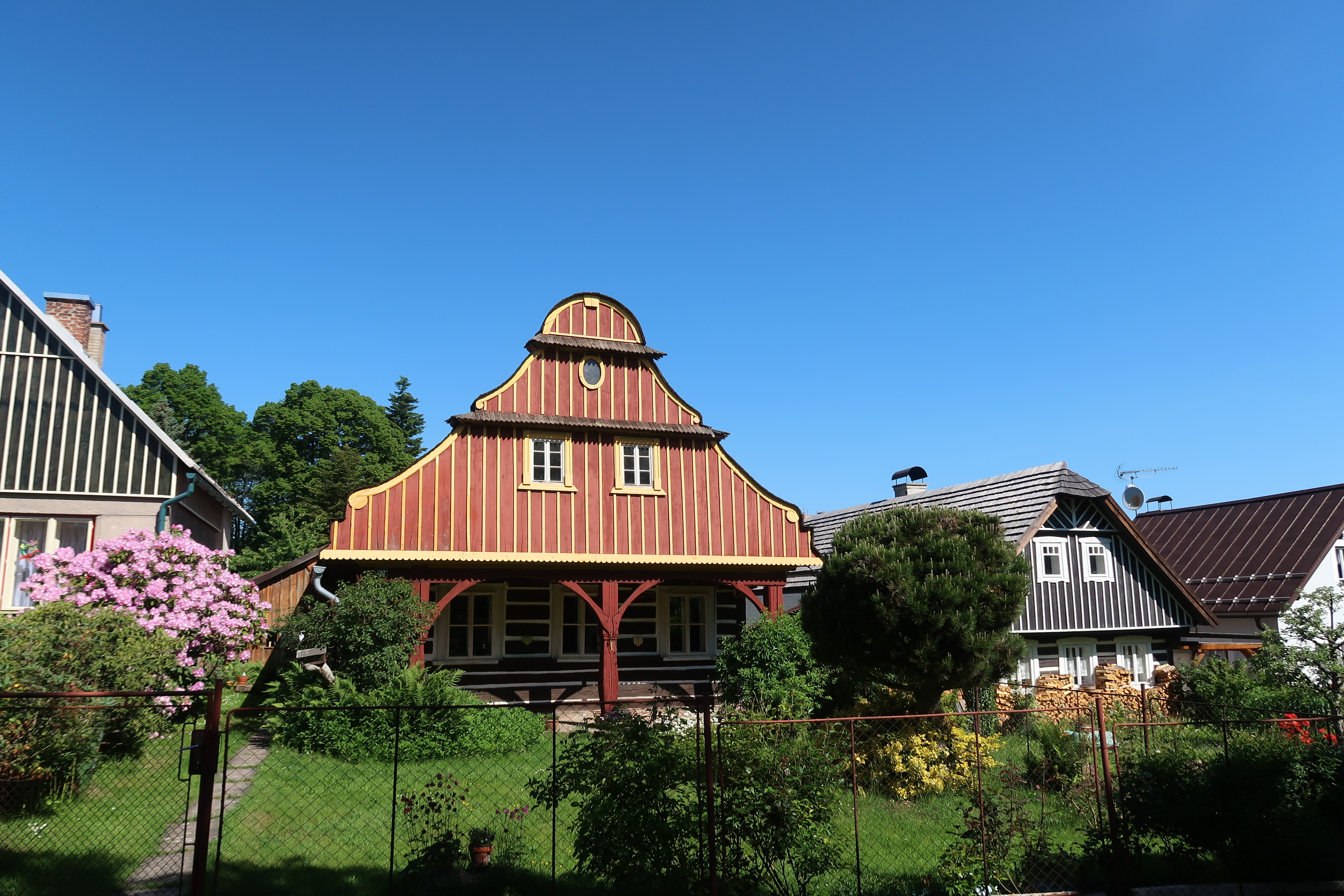
Northern part of Karlovské náměstí

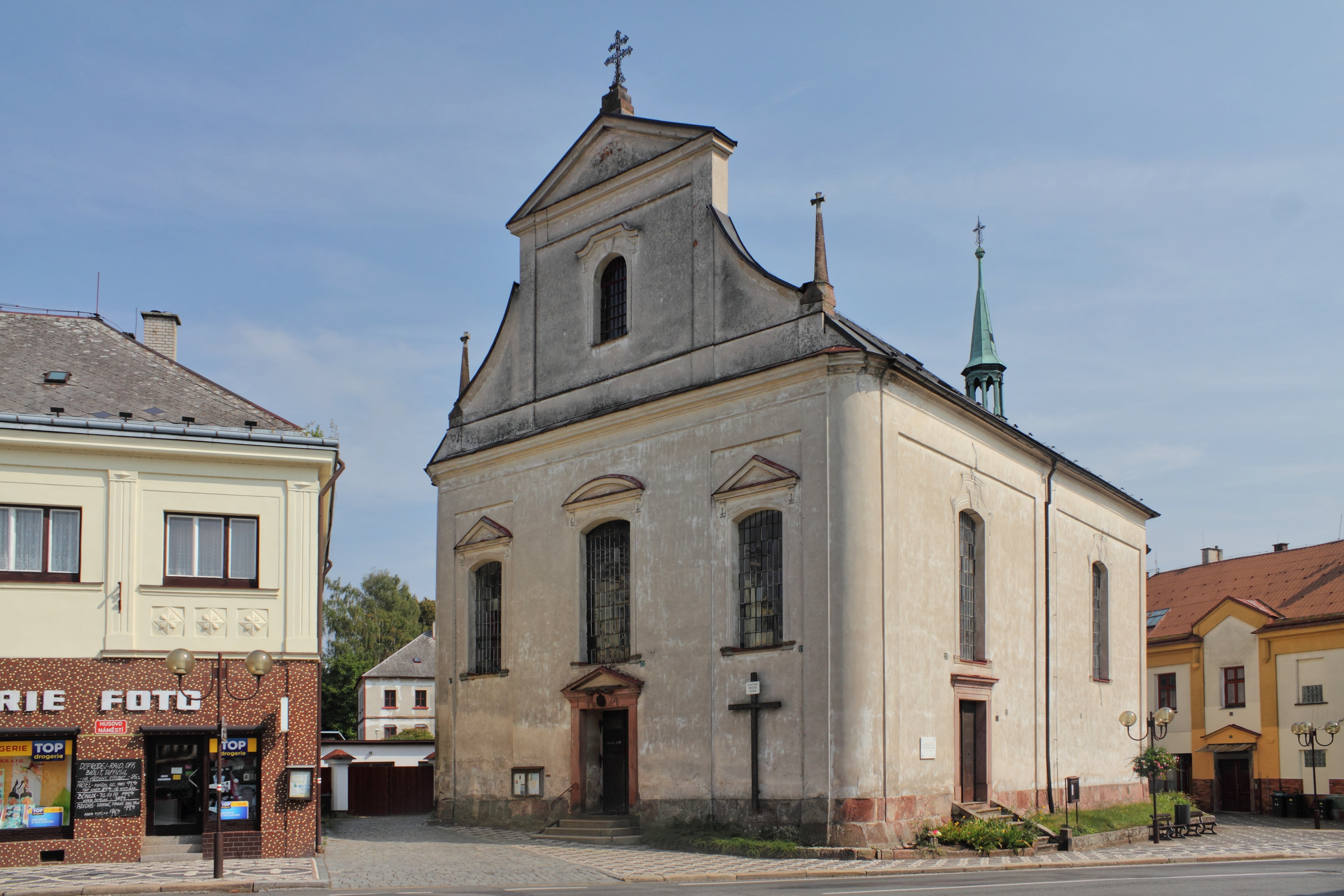
Church of Saint Nicholas

The most valuable part of the town is Karlov, formed by the square Karlovské náměstí and its closest surroundings. It was founded in 1739–1740 by Karl Joseph of Morzin and named by its founder. Karlov later urbanistically merged with the Lomnice nad Popelkou. Since 1995, it has been declared a village monument reservation. It is known for its preserved half-timbered houses, a typical example of local vernacular architecture.

The historic town centre is formed by the square Husovo náměstí. It main landmark is the town hall from 1864, after the previous town hall burned down. It has a neo-Gothic façade. Town Museum and Art Gallery was founded in 1891 and since 1945 has been located in a house called Hrubý dům, which was built in the 1820s and is the only Neoclassical building in the town.

Lomnice nad Popelkou Castle in the northern part of Husovo náměstí was created by rebuilding an old Gothic keep in 1566–1567 into the Renaissance castle, and then in 1730–1737 into its current Baroque form. Today it serves for cultural and social purposes and as the seat of the library.

Other sights on the square are two neo-Renaissance fountains from the second half of the 19th century, monument of Jan Hus from the 1890s, Baroque Marian column from 1713, and Baroque Church of Saint Nicholas from 1781.

== Notable people ==
- František Jiránek (1698–1778), composer, pupil of Antonio Vivaldi
- František Doubravský (1790–1867), choirmaster, organist and composer
- Karel Kodejška (born 1947), ski jumper
- Vladimír Martinec (born 1949), ice hockey player
- Ivan Ženatý (born 1962), violinist
