= Tomáš Kučera (footballer, born 1991) =

Czech footballer

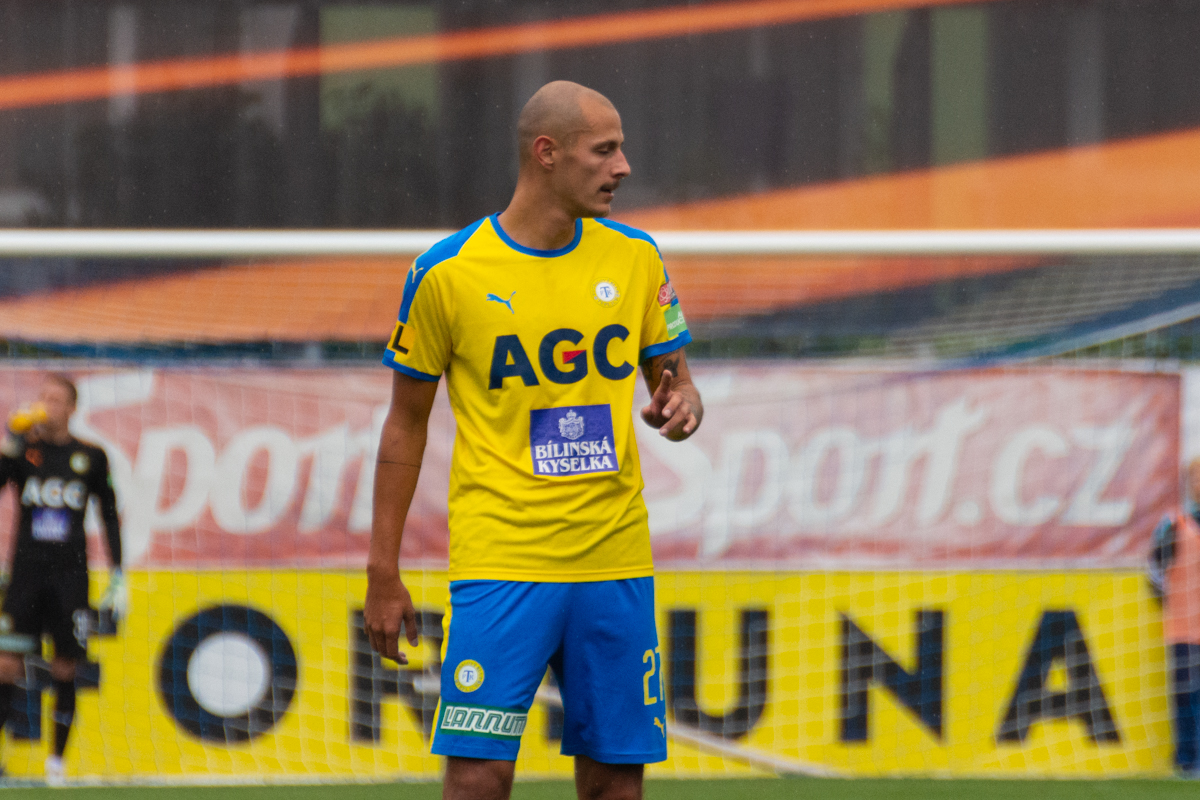
- Kučera in 2018

Personal information
- Date of birth: 20 July 1991 (age 35)
- Place of birth: Havlíčkův Brod, Czechoslovakia
- Height: 1.85 m (6 ft 1 in)
- Position: Midfielder

Team information
- Current team: Čáslav
- Number: 27

Youth career
- 1997–2003: Slovan Havlíčkův Brod
- 2003–2012: Vysočina Jihlava

Senior career*
Years	Team	Apps	(Gls)
2011–2015	Vysočina Jihlava	72	(7)
2013	→ Hradec Králové (loan)	10	(0)
2015–2017	Viktoria Plzeň	9	(1)
2016	→ Vysočina Jihlava (loan)	12	(1)
2016–2017	→ Teplice (loan)	22	(1)
2017–2023	Teplice	155	(7)
2023–2025	Ústí nad Labem	35	(2)
2025–	Čáslav	0	(0)
- * Club domestic league appearances and goals as of 16 February 2025

Tomáš Kučera (born 20 July 1991) is a Czech professional footballer who plays as a midfielder for Czech Fourth Division club Čáslav.
