= Tomáš Kučera (skier) =

Tomáš Kučera (born 8 August 1948 in Jablonec nad Nisou) is a Czechoslovak former Nordic combined skier who competed in the late 1960s and early 1970s. Competing in two Winter Olympics in the Nordic combined event, he finished fourth in the 1968 event and sixth in the 1972 event.

He is father of another Czech skier Milan Kučera.
