= Tomáš Kučera (footballer, born 1977) =

Czech footballer

Personal information
- Date of birth: 13 February 1977 (age 49)
- Place of birth: Czechoslovakia
- Height: 1.73 m (5 ft 8 in)
- Position: Forward

Youth career
- Letohrad

Senior career*
Years	Team	Apps	(Gls)
–1997	FC Hradec Králové		
1997–2003	Slavia Prague	4	(0)
1999	→ FK Viktoria Žižkov (loan)		
2000–2002	→ 1. FK Příbram (loan)	53	(5)
2003	Viktoria Plzeň	10	(0)
2004	FK AS Pardubice		
2004	FK Drnovice		
2004–2005	1. FK Příbram	8	(0)

International career
1997–1999	Czech Republic U21	6	(0)
2000	Czech Republic U23		
- * Club domestic league appearances and goals

Tomáš Kučera (born 13 February 1977) is a Czech former professional football forward. He made over 150 appearances in the Gambrinus liga. He played international football at under-21 level for Czech Republic U21 and represented his country in Football at the 2000 Summer Olympics.
