= Giant Mountains Foothills =

Foothill region in the Czech Republic

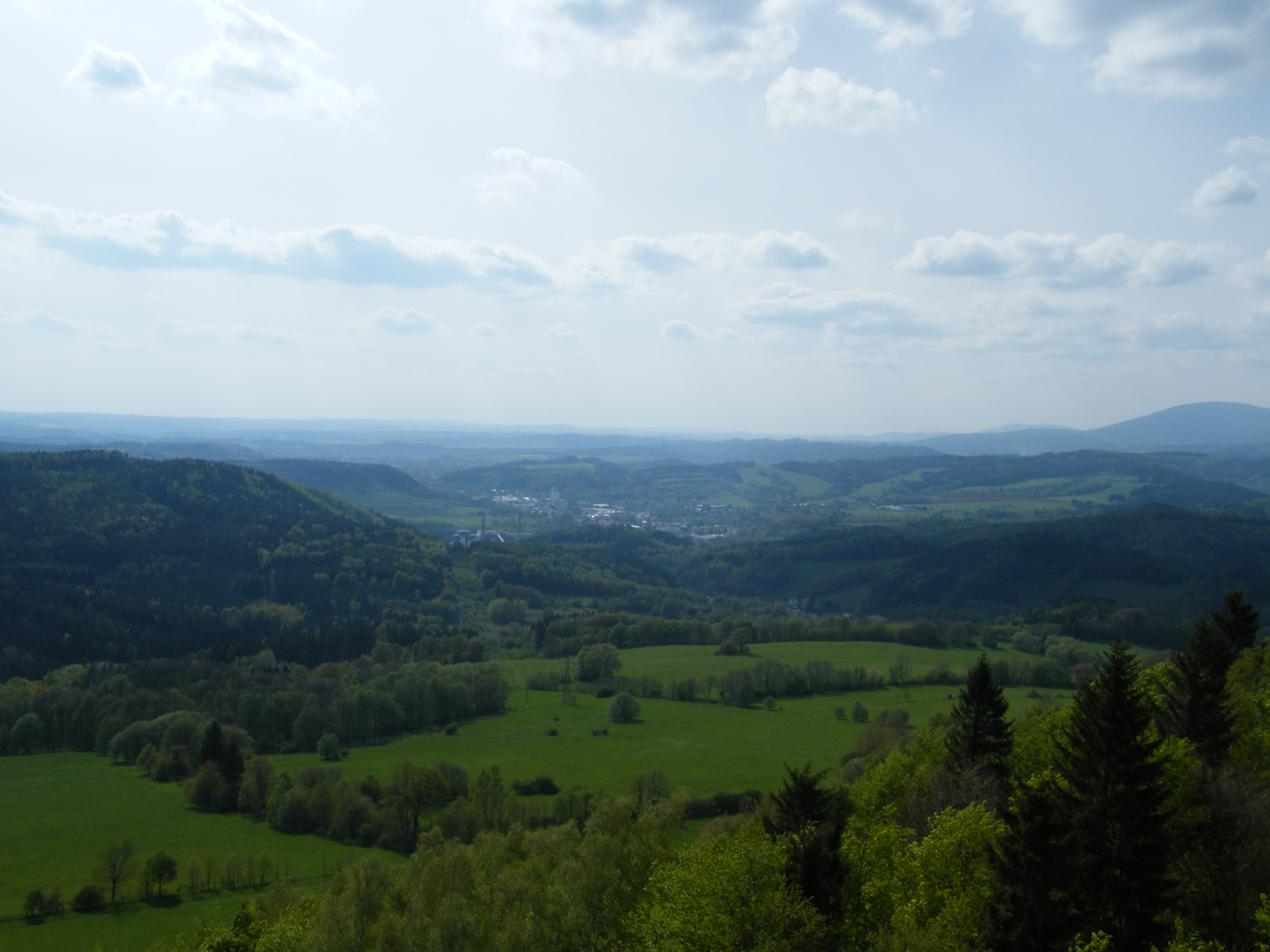
- Eastern part of the territory with Trutnov

Highest point
- Peak: Hejlov
- Elevation: 839 m (2,753 ft)

Dimensions
- Length: 75 km (47 mi)
- Area: 1,247 km^{2} (481 mi^{2})

Geography
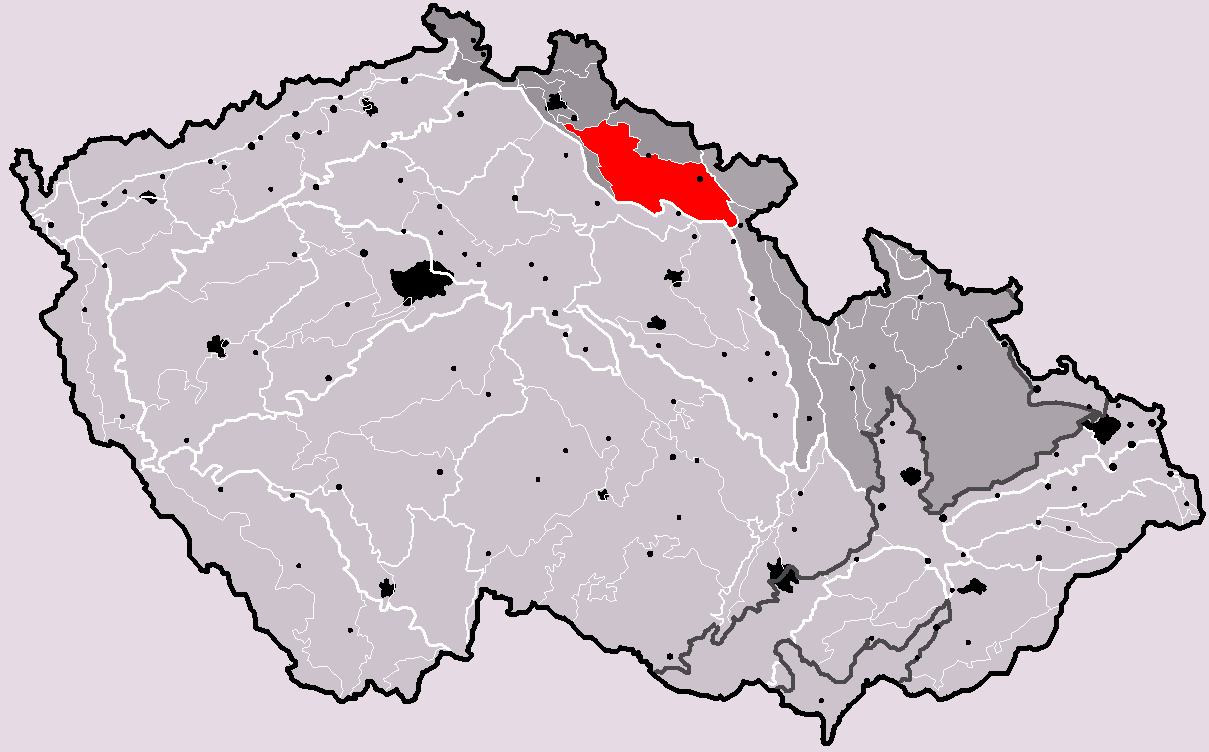
- Giant Mountains Foothills in the geomorphological system of the Czech Republic
- Country: Czech Republic
- Regions: Hradec Králové, Liberec
- Range coordinates: 50°33′N 15°38′E
- Parent range: Western Sudetes

The Giant Mountains Foothills (Czech: Krkonošské podhůří) are foothills of the Giant Mountains range and a geomorphological mesoregion of the Czech Republic. It is located in the Hradec Králové and Liberec regions.

== Geomorphology ==
The Giant Mountains Foothills is a mesoregion of the Western Sudetes within the Bohemian Massif. The foothills extend along the Giant Mountains and it is a rugged hilly area, larger than the Giant Mountains themselves. The mesoregion is further subdivided into the microregions of Železný Brod Highlands, Podkrkonošská Uplands and Zvičina–Kocléřov Ridge.

The highest peaks of the Giant Mountains Foothills are:

- Hejlov, 839 m (2,753 ft)
- Fučíkův vršek, 783 m (2,569 ft)
- Stráž, 782 m (2,566 ft)
- Aldrov, 776 m (2,546 ft)
- Skalka, 768 m (2,520 ft)
- Poustka, 745 m (2,444 ft)
- Petruškovy vrchy, 720 m (2,360 ft)
- Tomášovy vrchy, 719 m (2,359 ft)
- Chlum, 696 m (2,283 ft)
- Šibeniční vrch, 692 m (2,270 ft)

== Geology ==
The geomorhological region of Giant Mountains Foothills has a similar definition to the geological region of the Podkrkonoší Basin. The geological bedrock consists mainly of sediments and Permian volcanic rocks. The area is popular with collectors of minerals and semi-precious gemstones.

== Geography ==
The Giant Mountains Foothills roughly stretches from the west to the east. The foothills have an area of 1,247 square kilometres (481 sq mi) and an average elevation of 463 metres (1,519 ft).

The central part of the territory is drained by the upper course of the Elbe River. The western part is drained by the Jizera and the eastern part by the Úpa, both tributaries of the Elbe.

The most populated towns, located mostly or entirely in the territory, are Trutnov, Nová Paka, Semily, Lomnice nad Popelkou, Jilemnice and Hostinné.

== Nature ==
A small part of the Krkonoše National Park extends into the northwestern part of the Giant Mountains Foothills. A negligible part of the Bohemian Paradise Protected Landscape Area also extends into the mesoregion.
