= Rotštejn Castle =

Coordinates: 50°35′40″N 15°13′27″E

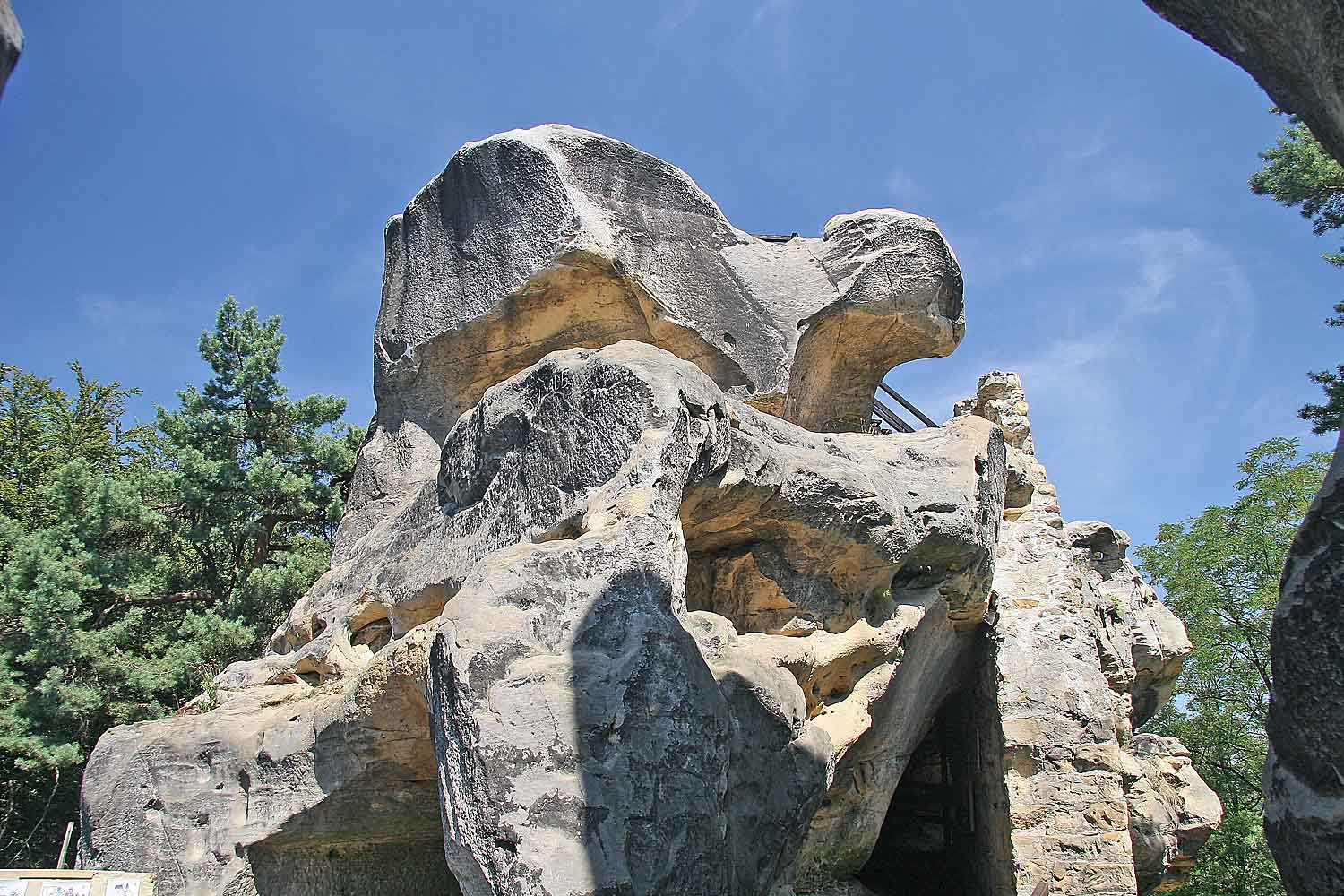
Ruins of Rotštejn

Rotštejn (German: Rothenstein) is a ruined rock castle around 9 kilometres (6 mi) east of Turnov on the border of the Nature Reserve "Klokočské rocks". The castle was partially built of stone walls and partially carved in the sandstone rocks where it stands. The most famous owner of the castle though was Wok II of Rotštejn.

== History ==
The castle was built shortly before 1250 by members of the Markwartic family. The first owner cited was Jaroslav of Hrutwice, today Hruštice, who built the castle for his son Vok of Rotštejn. For his second son, Zdeněk, he built Valdštejn Castle and became the founder of the Waldstein family.

In 1360 the castle was in the possession of Ješek of Rotštejn, who obtained permission from Charles IV to hold a weekly market in the nearby village of Klokočí. In the year 1415, the Rotštejn family died out and the whole estate fell to Andrew and Vanek Paldrovi Varina, who owned the entire estate throughout the Hussite Wars. The castle was probably burned by the Hussites, unlike other neighboring castles, such as Návarov Castle. According to other sources, the castle was conquered in 1426, but its landlord lived on a farm in the nearby village of Klokočí. Hussite presence at the castle is not confirmed by archaeological findings and written sources. In a later written mention of the castle in 1540, it is reported as abandoned, with the rocks and walls demolished in the courtyard.

To further contributed to the destruction of the castle was the natural erosion of the sandstone rocks. In a report of 1514 the castle was considered abandoned with walls and rocks warped in the courtyard. During the Thirty Years' War in the beginning of the 17th century, this place was used to shelter people from the soldiers. Residents were hiding in cavities carved into the sandstone rocks that were mistakenly considered part of the castle stables.

== Construction ==
Rotštejn Castle was erected with strong elements of brick architecture. Adjacent rocks, which also served as part of the defense system. Safety elements were supplemented by the usual means of that time, such as gateways, bridges, bastion. These structural safety elements, however, have been preserved, but can only be seen in carved niches. All castle walls disappeared. The form of the castle was preserved in written documents.

Since 1988 the civil protection association of Klokočské rocks led chatelaine H.T. Hlubučková. Wooden walkways and paths were built, through which visitors can get to the top of the castle and view a panorama of the Klokočské rocks. The castle area is also a small center for environmental and ecological education.

== Legend ==
According to a legend treasure was hidden under Rotštejn. Several people from the surrounding area gathered to look for the treasure on Easter Friday. On this day the earth cracked before them and a pile of money appeared like dancing blue flames. Only one of them dared to go for the treasure. The earth closed over him and he fell asleep beside the treasure. When he awoke, he did not see the treasure. For some time he looked for a way back home, when he found the way he returned home. There he realised that he was away from home for a whole year and that his neighbors discovered the treasure. But the quest for the treasure cost their lives. For a time he was happy with what he was given by his honest friends, and soon he traveled to where money is not worth a thing, where the real treasure is what men have in their hearts.

== Points of interest ==
- Kozákov - guardian mountain of the Bohemian Paradise
- Hrubý Rohozec – château
- Valdštejn Castle
- Hrubá Skála – château
- Vranov Castle
- Kopanina – watchtower
- Trosky – ruins
- Klokočské skály - nature reserve (sandrock town)

== Gallery ==
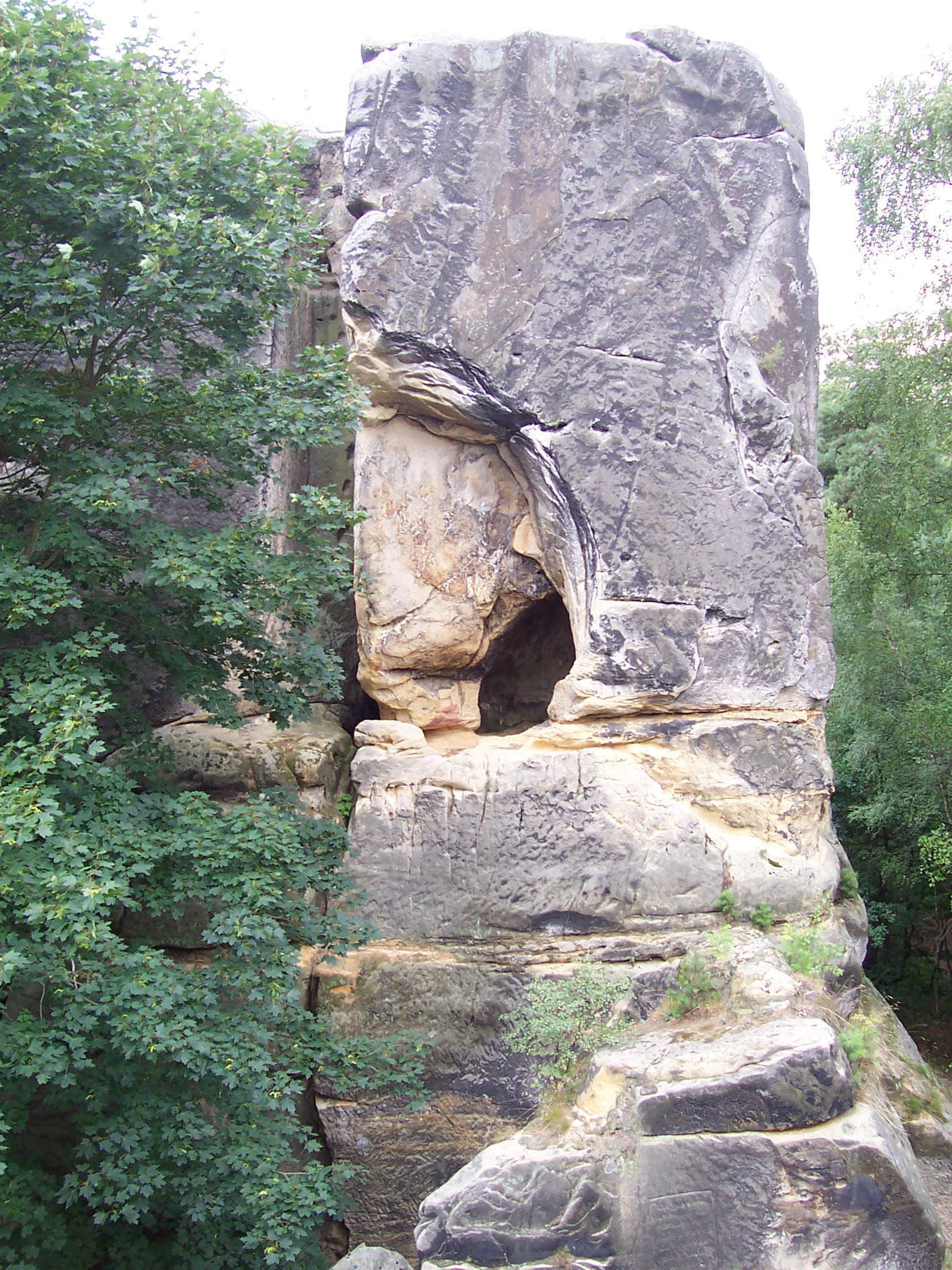
Rocks opposite the accessible parts of the castle, located originally in the castle tower

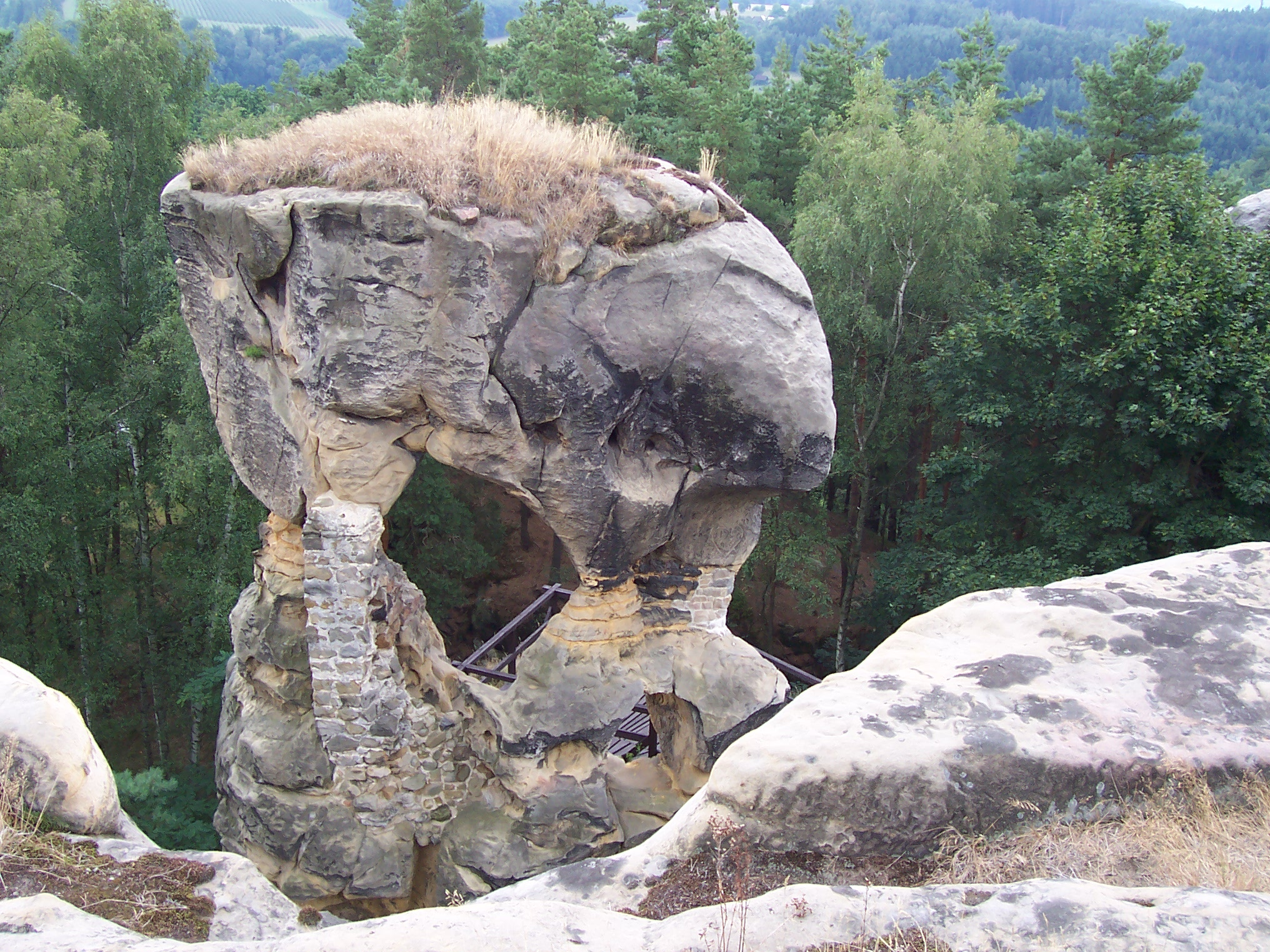
Skalní okno, which was adjacent to the half-timbered gatehouse

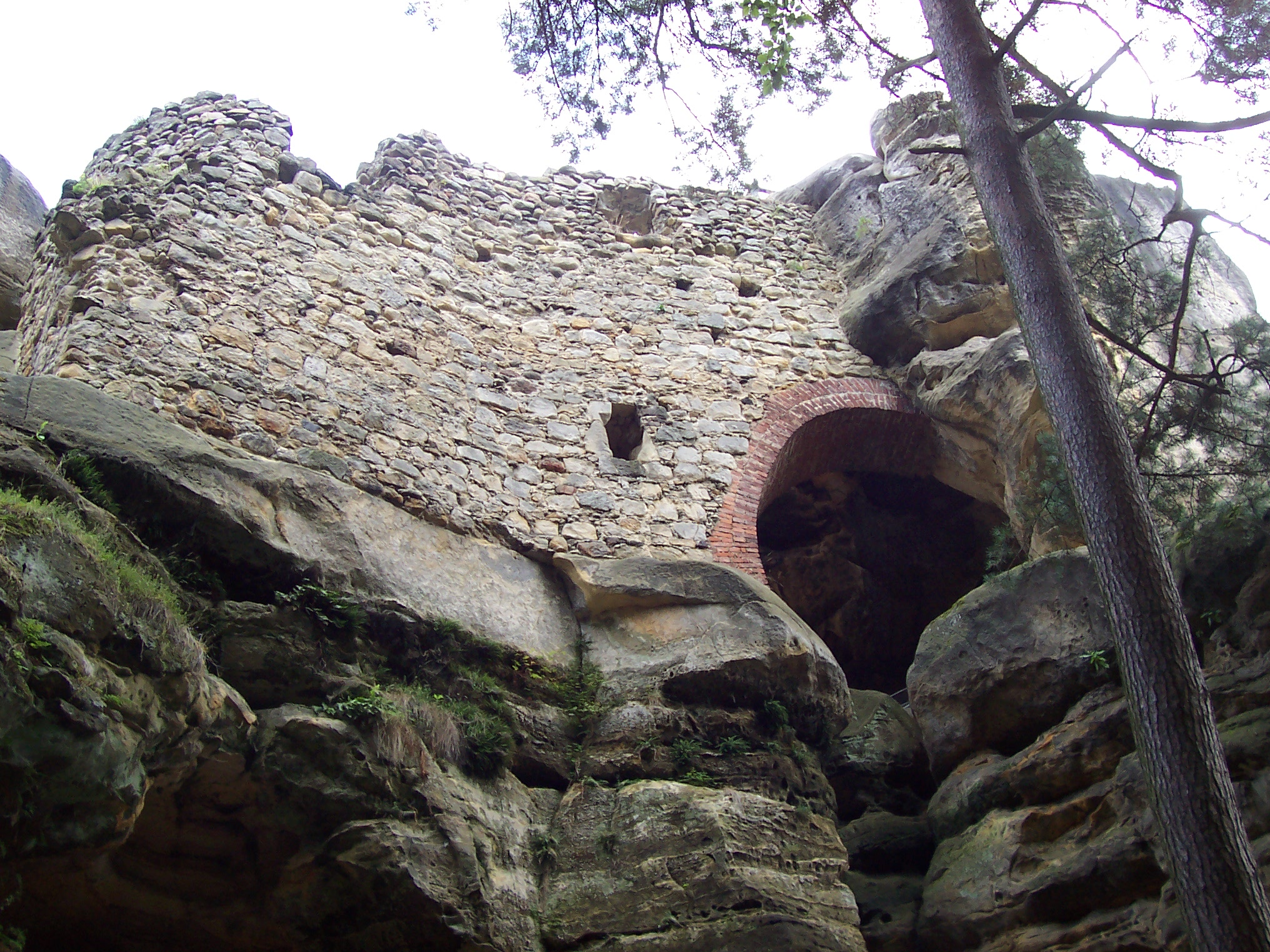
One of the few remaining walls

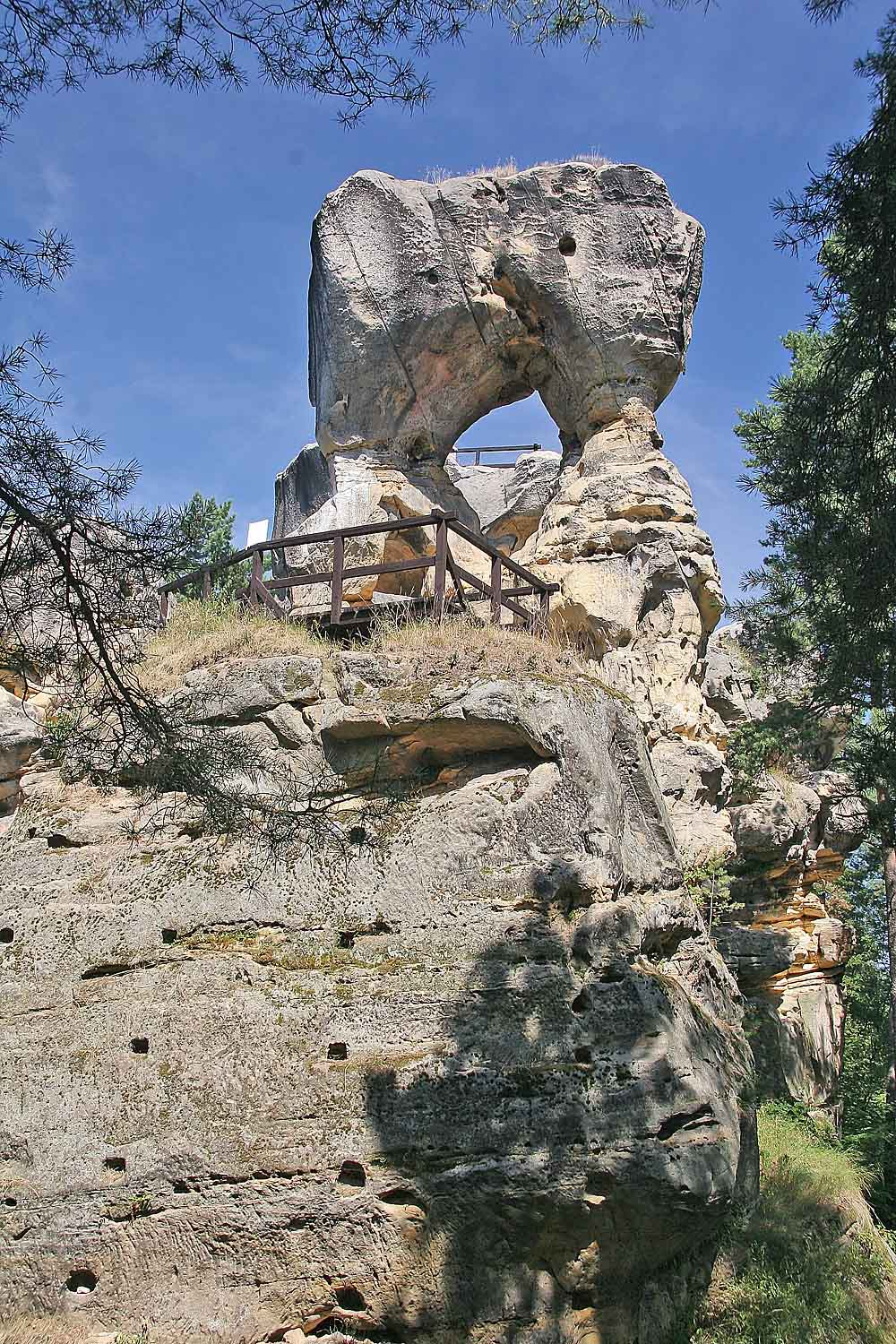
Skalní okno in Rotštejn Castle
