= Otto III of Bergau =

Bohemian nobleman (d. 1414)

- Highest Burgrave of the Kingdom of Bohemia
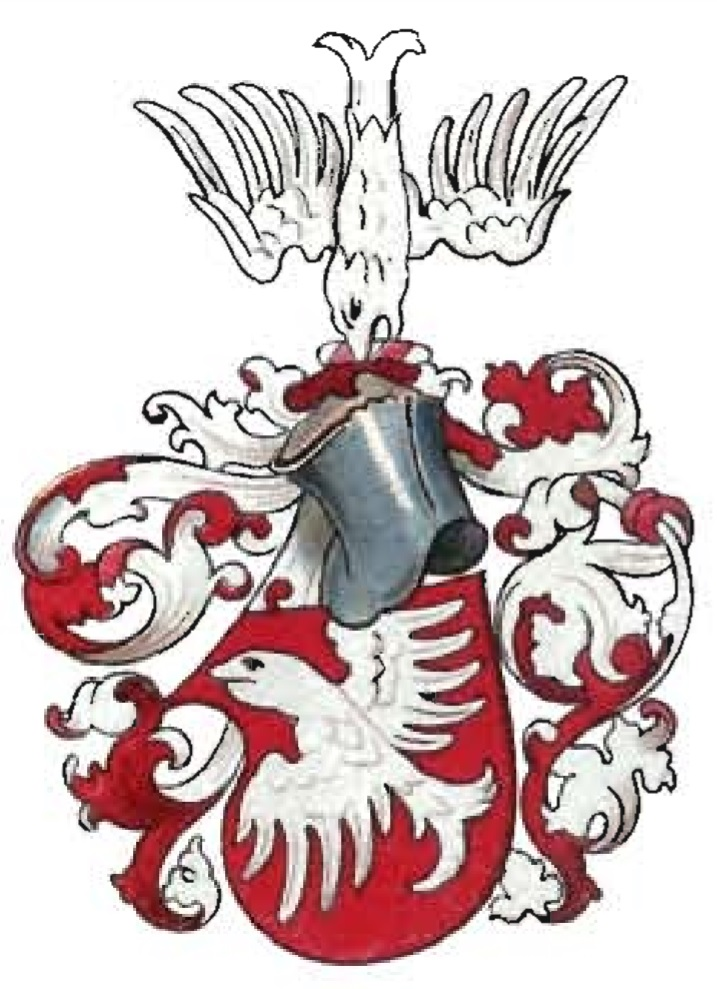
- Coat of arms
- Native name: Otto der Ältere von Bergow / Ota III. z Bergova
- Died: 1414
- Noble family: Lords of Bergau
- Issue: Otto IV of Bergau
- Father: Albert of Bergau

Otto III of Bergau (German: Otto der Ältere von Bergow; died 1414), also known as Otto the Elder of Bergau, was a Bohemian nobleman, high-ranking provincial official, and political opponent of Wenceslaus IV of Bohemia.

== Biography ==
Otto was the son of Albert of Bergau, and he inherited the castles of Nový Žeberk and Bílina Castle. He held the office of Highest Burgrave of the Kingdom of Bohemia from 1388 to 1393.

Otto was a part of the League of Lords against Wenceslaus IV of Bohemia. He likely set off the course of events that secured the capture of Wenceslaus in 1394. After the truce with Sigismund of Luxembourg in 1396, Otto was appointed to Wenceslaus' royal council.

In 1399, Otto had a son, Otto IV of Bergau with his second wife, Markéta of Žlunice.

Otto continued to support Sigismund and his claim to the throne. Wenceslaus was recaptured in 1402, and for his loyalty, Sigismund appointed Otto as provincial under-chamberlain in the Kingdom of Bohemia. Otto raised taxes on cities and monasteries and instituted a Jewish pogrom, which resulted in an influx of money into the royal treasury. In a contemporary report, it was stated that, "...the Hungarian king Sigismund committed many evils with the help of some Czech lords like... [Otto] Bergau... and so on."

In 1403, Otto was appointed one of a five-member group of executors of power when Sigismund left the country. However, waning political support for Sigismund led to attacks against his supporters, including Otto.

During his lifetime, Otto and his son, Otto IV, acquired further estates including Trosky Castle, Hrubý Rohozec, Zbiroh, and parts of Jirkov and Turnov. Otto III died in 1414.

== In popular culture ==
Otto von Bergow, a character in Kingdom Come: Deliverance II, is based on Otto III of Bergau. He was voiced by Marek Vašut in the Czech as well as English version of the game.
