= Klokočí =

Klokočí may refer to places in the Czech Republic:

- Klokočí (Přerov District), a municipality and village in the Olomouc Region
- Klokočí (Semily District), a municipality and village in the Liberec Region
- Klokočí, a village and part of Olší (Brno-Country District) in the South Moravian Region
