= Troskovice =

- Municipality
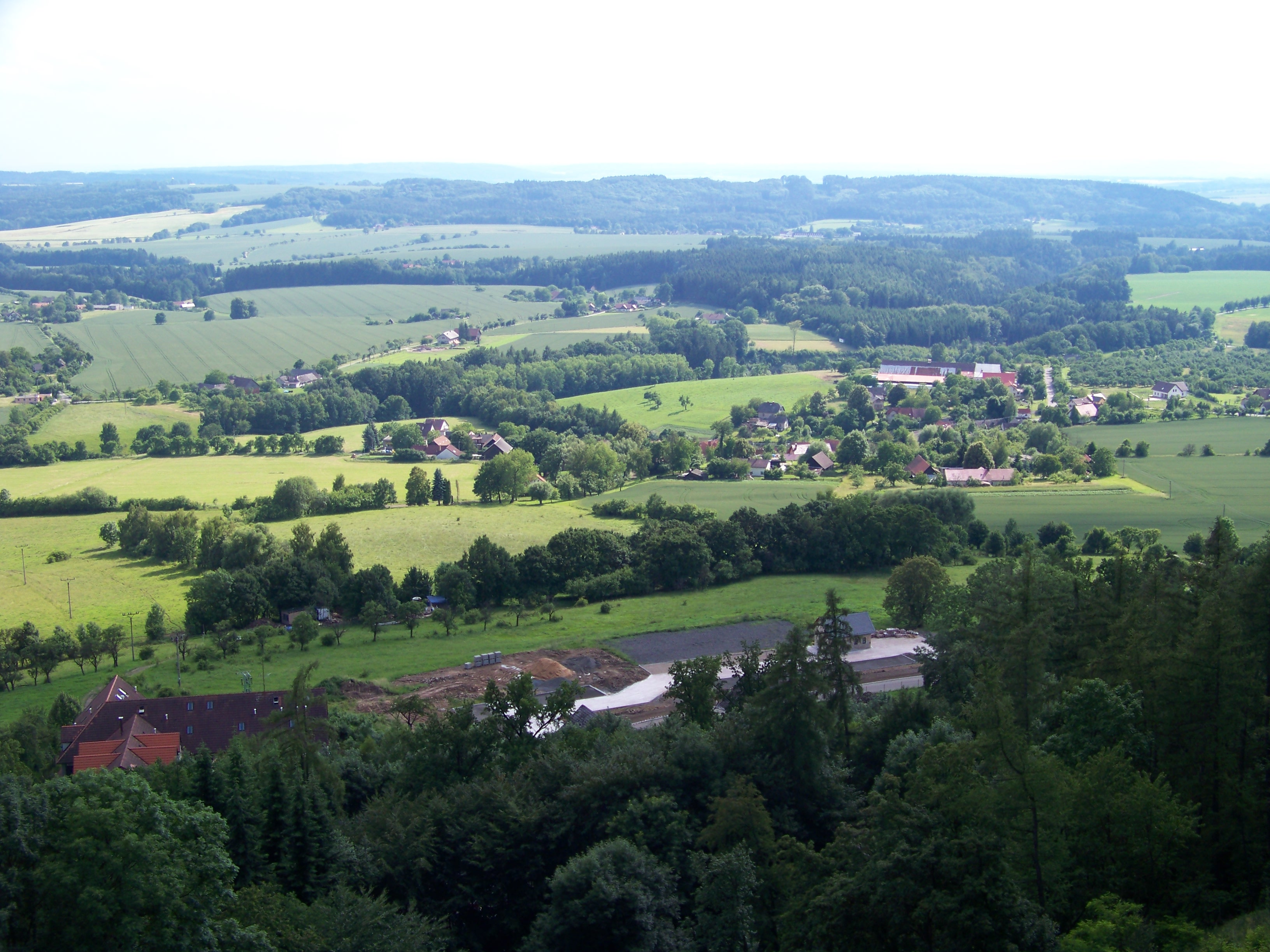
- Troskovice seen from the Trosky Castle

- Location in the Czech Republic
- Coordinates: 50°30′42″N 15°13′21″E
- Country: Czech Republic
- Region: Liberec
- District: Semily
- First mentioned: 1388

Area
  - Total: 8.28 km^{2} (3.20 sq mi)
- Elevation: 349 m (1,145 ft)

Population (2026-01-01)
  - Total: 77
  - Density: 9.3/km^{2} (24/sq mi)
- Time zone: UTC+1 (CET)
  - Summer (DST): UTC+2 (CEST)
- Postal code: 512 63
- Website: www.obectroskovice.cz

Troskovice (German: Troskowitz) is a municipality and village in Semily District in the Liberec Region of the Czech Republic. It has about 80 inhabitants.

== Administrative division ==
Troskovice consists of four municipal parts (in brackets population according to the 2021 census):

- Troskovice (68)
- Jivina (6)
- Křenovy (3)
- Tachov (20)

== Etymology ==
The village of Troskovice was named after the Trosky Castle, near which it was founded, meaning "Trosky's village". The name Trosky literally means 'debris' and was probably named after the crumbling rocks on which it was built.

== Geography ==
Troskovice is located about 10 kilometres (6 mi) south of Turnov and 29 km (18 mi) south of Liberec. It lies in the Jičín Uplands. The highest point is the hill Trosky at 488 m (1,601 ft) above sea level. The Žehrovka Stream flows along the southern municipal border and supplies two fishponds there: Nebákov and Podsemínský rybník. The almost entire territory of the municipality lies in the Bohemian Paradise Protected Landscape Area.

== History ==
The Trosky Castle was built in 1365–1393 for Čeněk of Vartemberk. The first written mention of Troskovice is from 1388.

== Demographics ==
Historical population

Year	Pop.	±%
1869	650	—
1880	624	−4.0%
1890	691	+10.7%
1900	632	−8.5%
1910	557	−11.9%

Year	Pop.	±%
1921	516	−7.4%
1930	465	−9.9%
1950	348	−25.2%
1961	325	−6.6%
1970	268	−17.5%

Year	Pop.	±%
1980	197	−26.5%
1991	160	−18.8%
2001	130	−18.8%
2011	100	−23.1%
2021	97	−3.0%

Source: Censuses

== Transport ==
There are no railways or major roads passing through the municipality.

== Sights ==
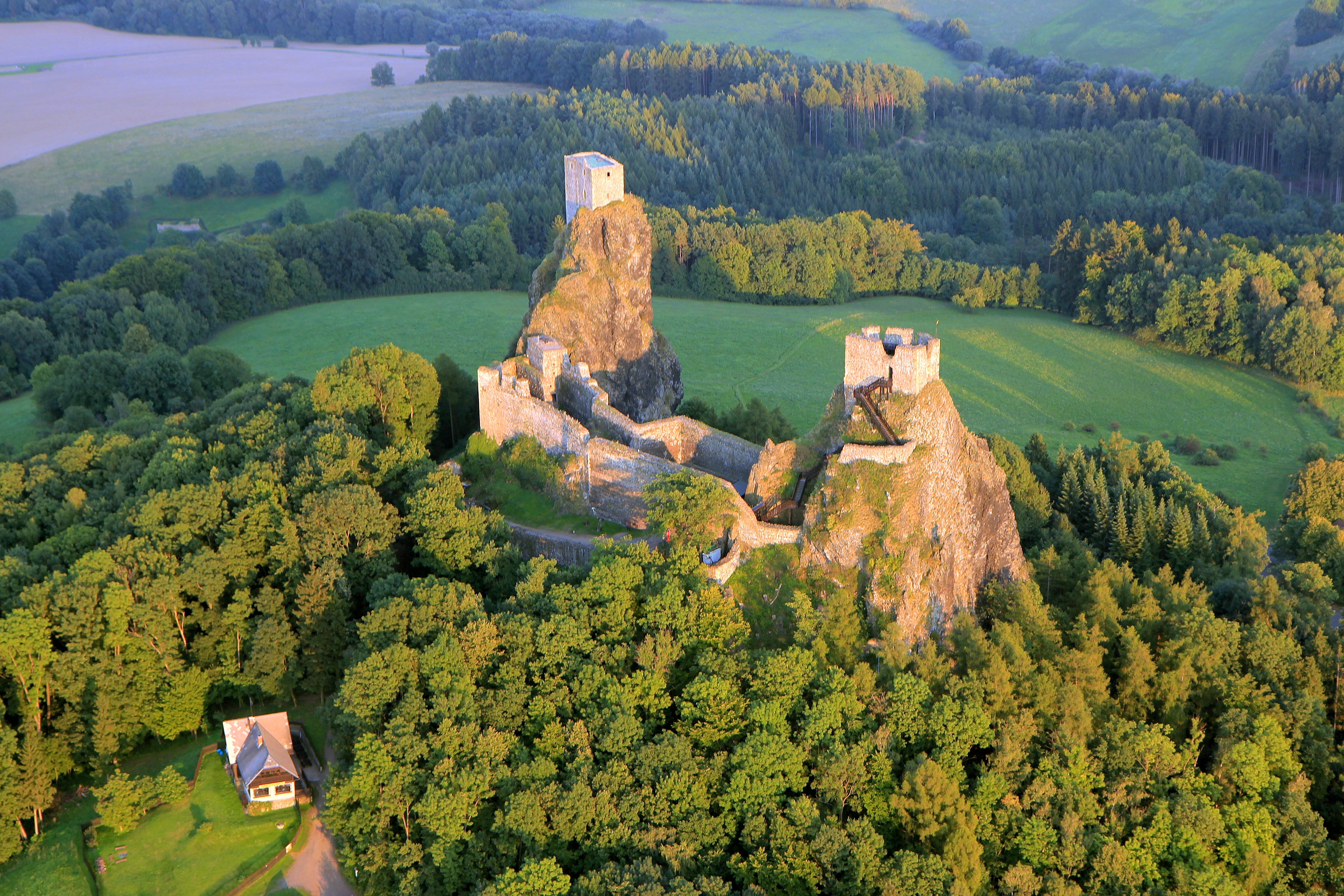
Aerial view of the Trosky Castle

Troskovice is known for the ruins of the Trosky Castle. The castle was built on a unique rock formation, formed by two tower-like peaks called Panna ('virgin') and Baba ('old woman'). During the Thirty Years' War, the castle was conquered by the Swedish army and burned down, and it has been a ruin ever since. For its value, the castle is protected as a national cultural monument. The castle is among the most visited tourist destinations of the Liberec Region.

Next to the fispond Nebákov is a Baroque water mill, protected as a cultural monument. It was rebuilt into its current form in 1743.

== In popular culture ==
A recreation of the town as it existed in 1403 is featured in the Czech role-playing game Kingdom Come: Deliverance II.
