= Valdštejn Castle =

Coordinates: 50°33′45″N 15°10′01″E

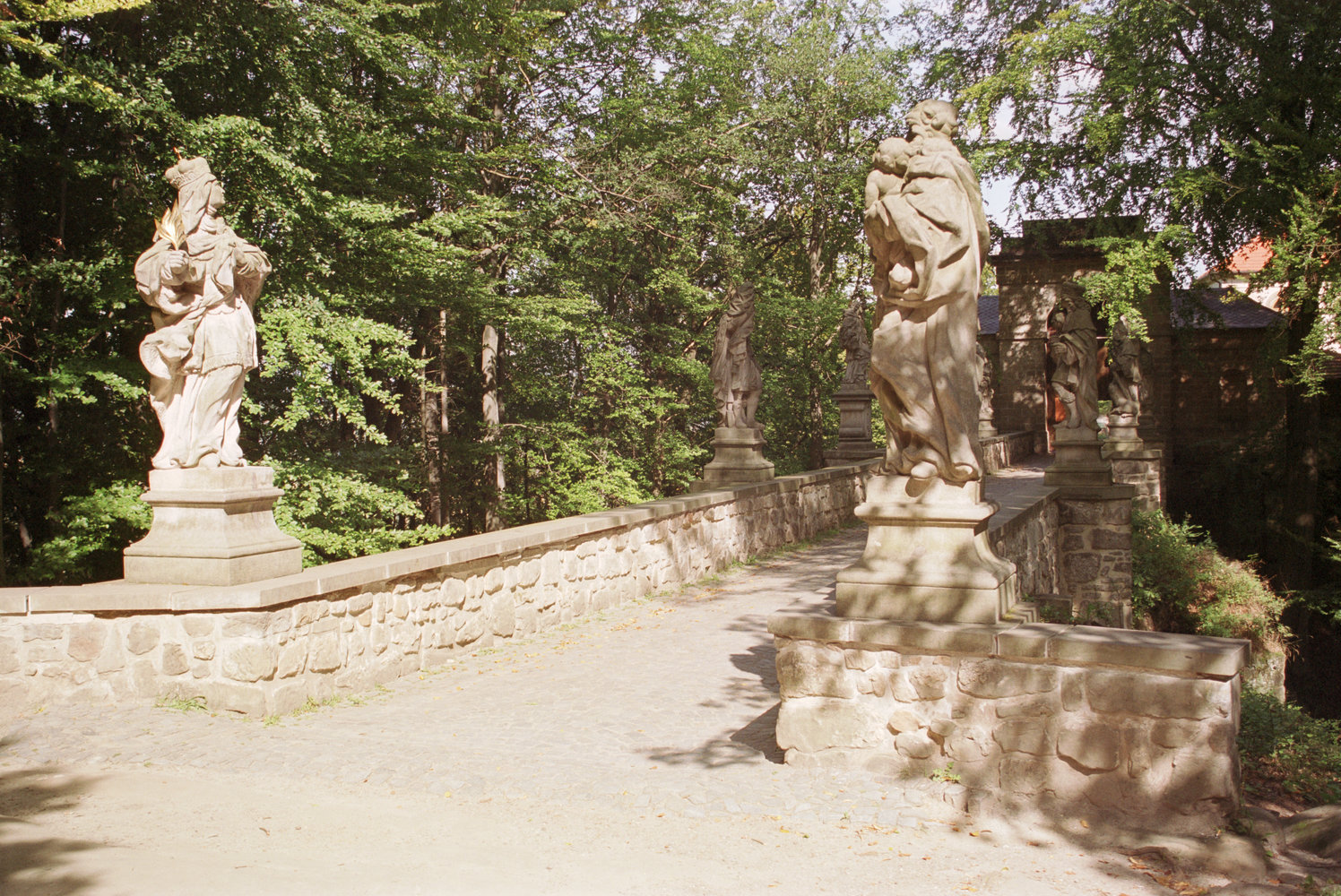
The first bridge to Waldstein Castle with sculptures by the Jelínek brothers, 1725–35

Valdštejn Castle (Czech: hrad Valdštejn, German: Waldstein) is an early Gothic fortress near Turnov, in the Czech Republic. It can be found in the cliff dwelling city of Hruboskalsko, in the Bohemian Paradise (Český ráj).

The city was built on three sandstone cliffs in the second half of the thirteenth century by Counts of the Waldstein family. After 1420 the castle was occupied by the Hussites, then later by robber barons. In 1621 the abandoned castle was bought back by the Waldsteins, whose most illustrious member was Albrecht von Wallenstein. During the peak of the Baroque period, they built a pilgrimage church, dedicated to John of Nepomuk, in 1722 on the ruins of the castle.

== See also ==
- List of castles in the Czech Republic
- Rotštejn Castle

== Gallery ==
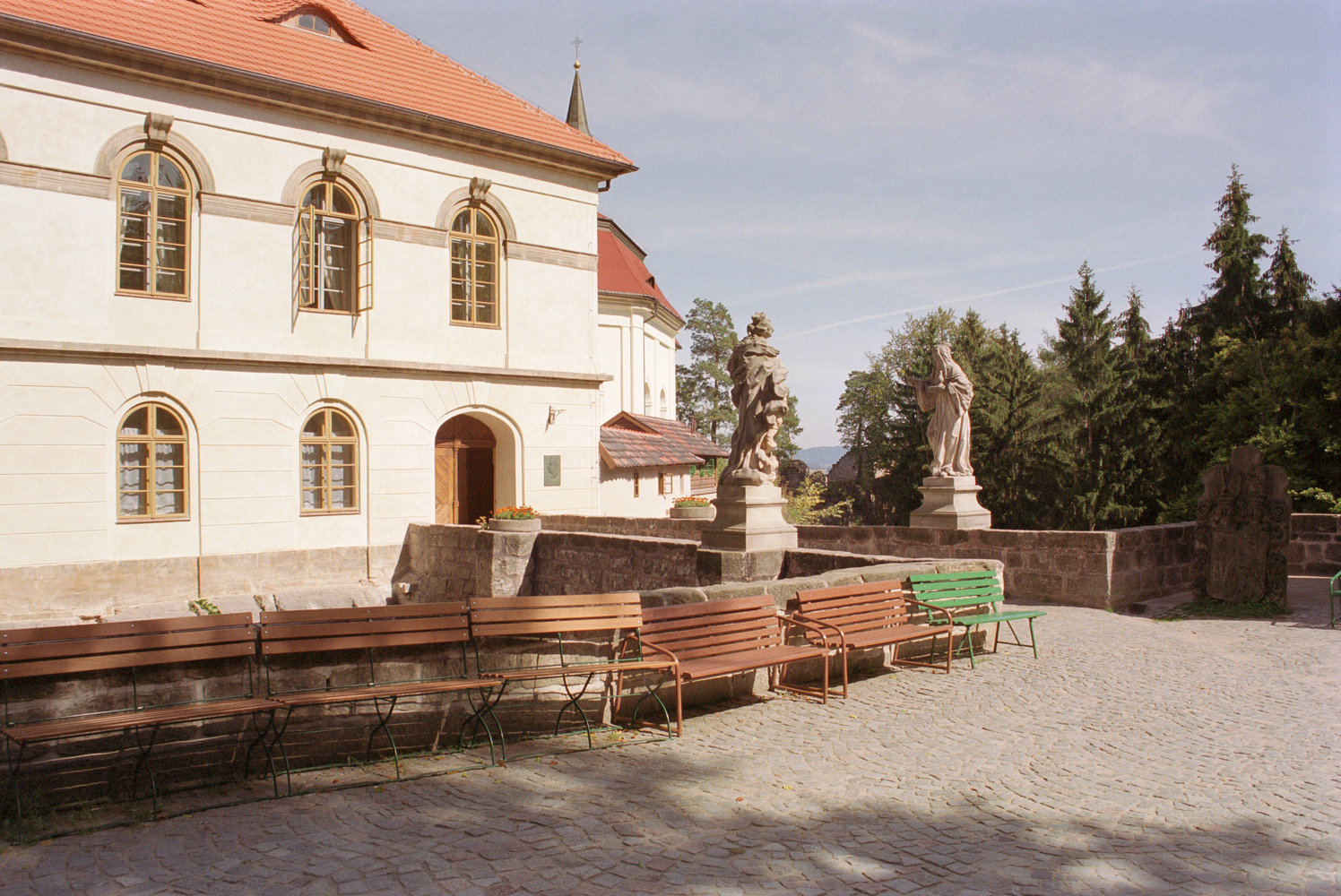
Waldstein Castle

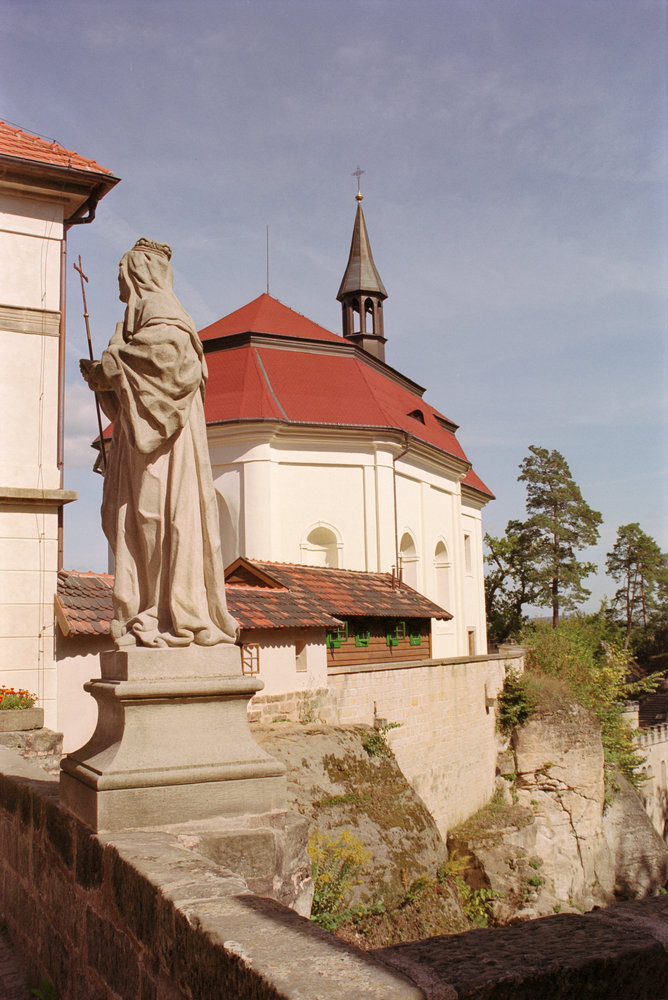
Waldstein Castle

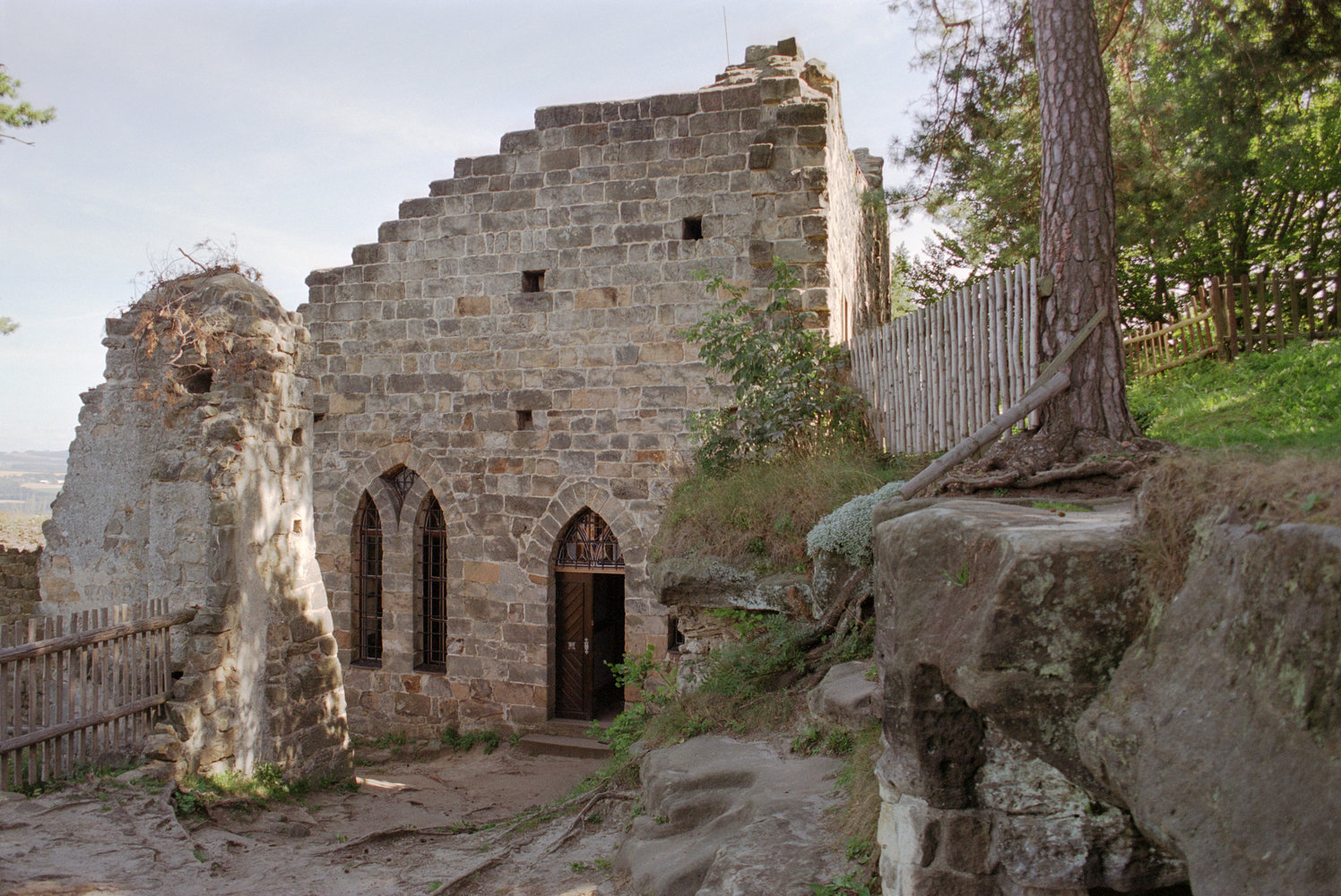
Waldstein Castle

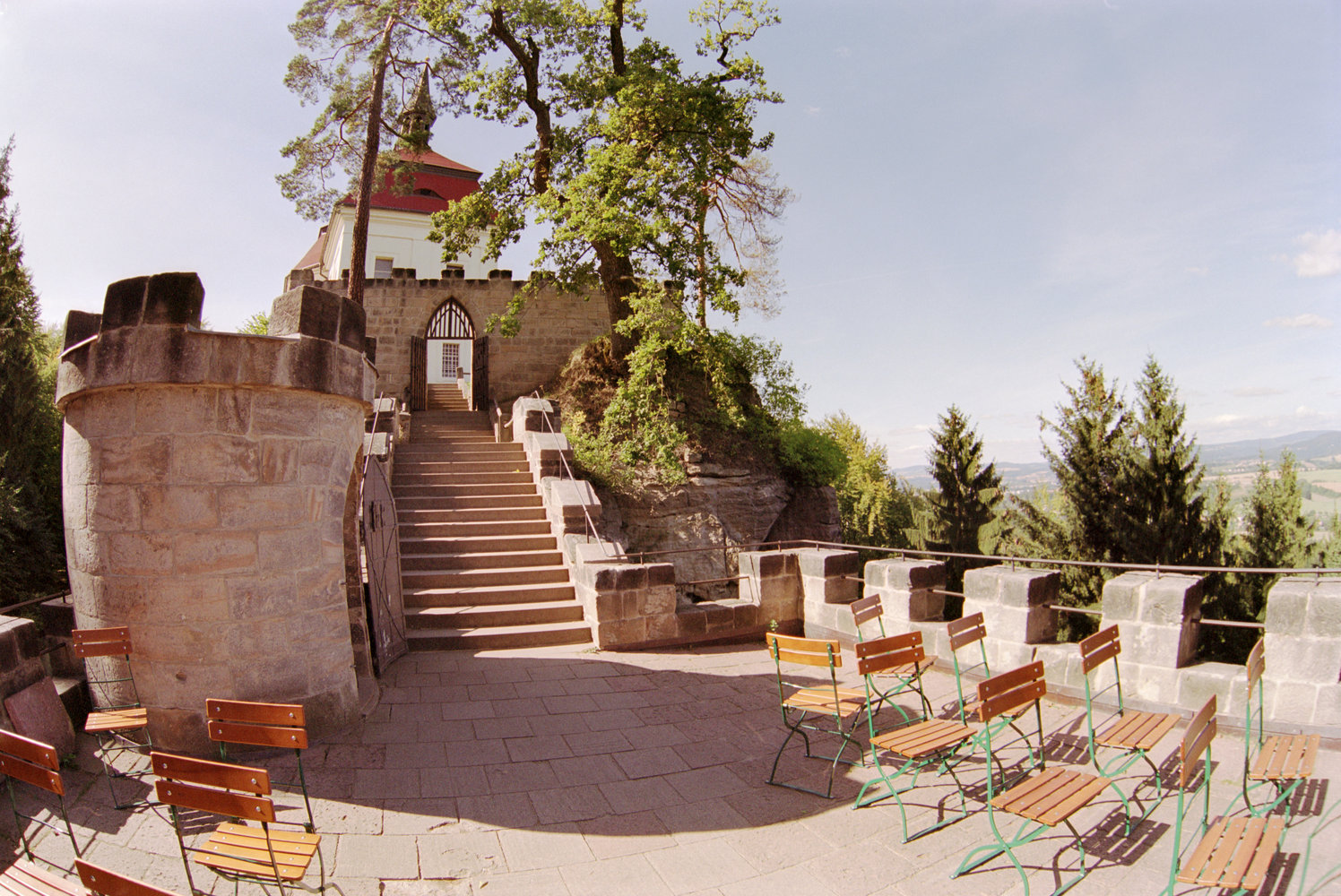
Waldstein Castle
