= Desfours family =

Austrian noble family

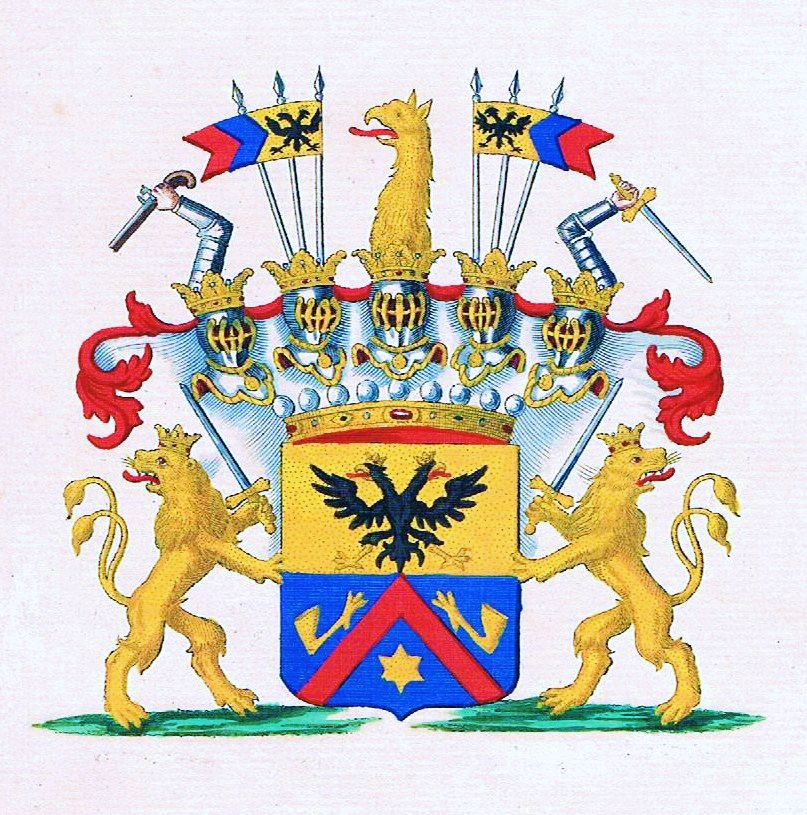
Coat of arms of Counts Desfours-Walderode

The Desfours family is an old Austrian noble family of French descent that originated in the Duchy of Lorraine, but became prominent in Bohemia during the 16th century.

== History ==
Their parent house is the Athienville from Luneville and Chateau-Salins. On 30 May 1634, the family was awarded withe the title of Imperial Count for Lieutenant field marshal Baron Niclas Desfours (1588-1661), who became Count Desfours zu Mont und Athienville.

In the mid-17th Century, the counts of Desfours were owners of the estates Groß Rohosetz and Morchenstern. Count Albrecht Maximilian limited the inheritance of these holding to them and their lineal descendants, in 1678. From this family the countly branch of Desfours-Walderode derived. Other properties of the family included Potštát (1797), Malá Skála (1628), Semily (1634), Tanvald and Velhartice (1743).
