= Otto IV of Bergau =

Bohemian nobleman (1399–1452)

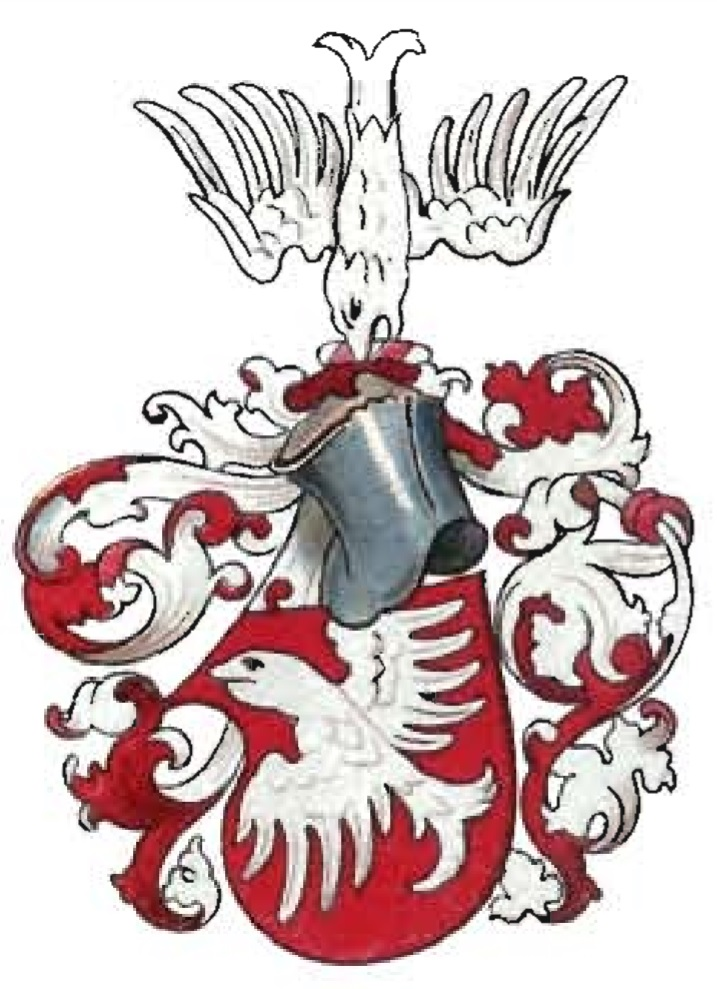
- Coat of arms
- Native name: Otto dem Jüngeren von Bergow / Ota IV. z Bergova
- Born: 1399
- Died: 1452 (aged 52–53)
- Noble family: Lords of Bergov
- Issue: John II of Bergau
- Father: Otto III of Bergau
- Mother: Markéta of Žlunice

Otto IV of Bergau (German: Otto dem Jüngeren von Bergow; 1399 – 1452), also known as Otto the Younger of Bergau, was a Bohemian nobleman and anti-Hussite leader.

== Biography ==
Otto was born in 1399 to Otto III of Bergau and Markéta of Žlunice. He inherited parts of his father's estate including Trosky Castle and Chlumec nad Cidlinou. In 1415, Otto raided the Opatovice Monastery in Opatovice nad Labem. He is said to have hidden the treasure in Trosky Castle, supposedly in an underground cellar blocked by a huge boulder.

In 1424, Chlumec nad Cidlinou was captured by the Prague Hussites under the leadership of Sigismund Korybut and Jan Hvězda of Vícemilice. It was then likely given to Hynek Boček of Poděbrady. Otto and his son, John, reclaimed Chlumec shortly thereafter.
