= Potštát =

- Town
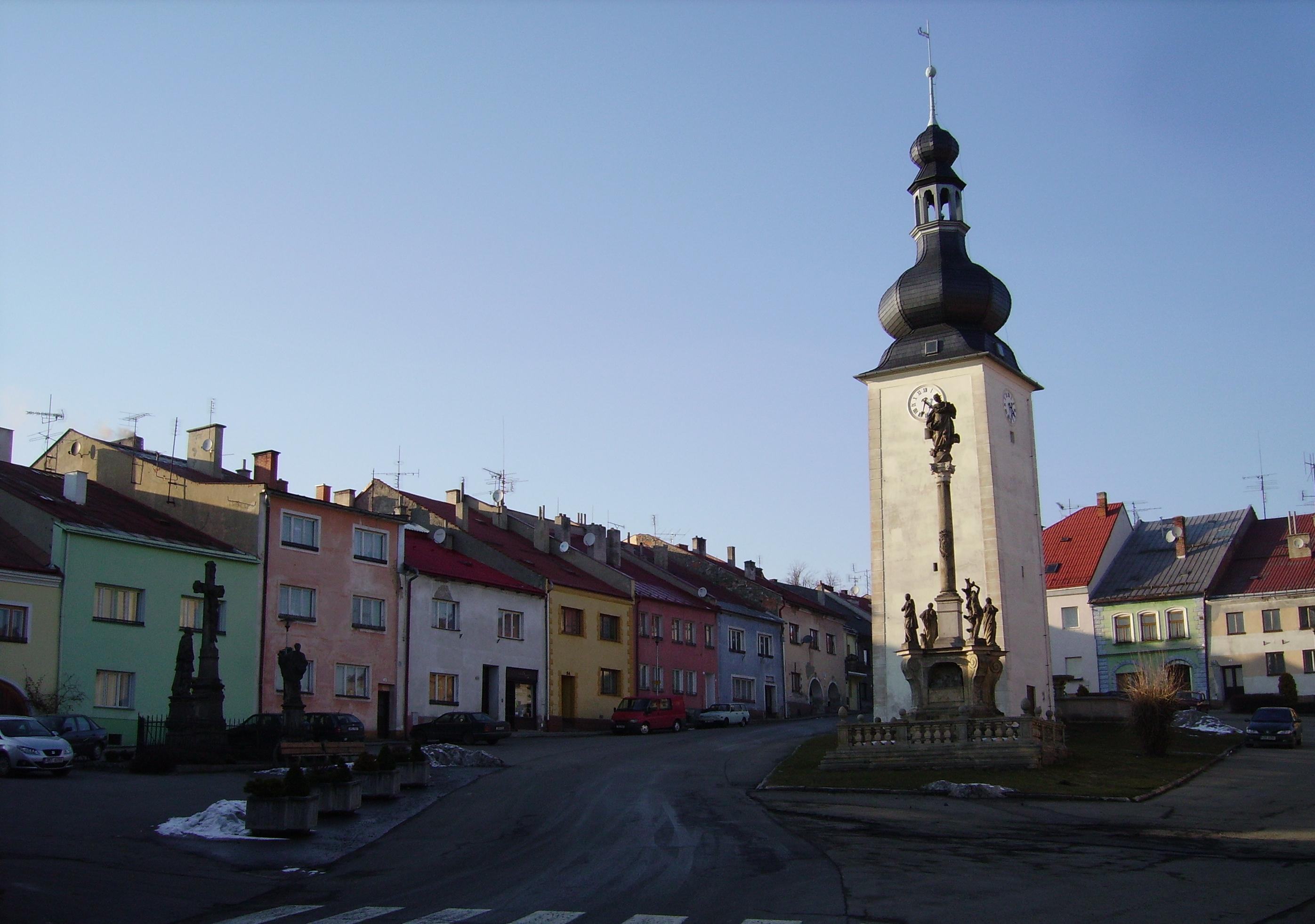
- The square Bočkovo náměstí

- Flag Coat of arms

- Location in the Czech Republic
- Coordinates: 49°38′13″N 17°39′6″E
- Country: Czech Republic
- Region: Olomouc
- District: Přerov
- First mentioned: 1322

Area
  - Total: 34.07 km^{2} (13.15 sq mi)
- Elevation: 502 m (1,647 ft)

Population (2026-01-01)
  - Total: 1,241
  - Density: 36.43/km^{2} (94.34/sq mi)
- Time zone: UTC+1 (CET)
  - Summer (DST): UTC+2 (CEST)
- Postal code: 753 62
- Website: www.potstat.cz

Potštát (Czech pronunciation: [ˈpot.ʃtaːt]; German: Bodenstadt) is a town in Přerov District in the Olomouc Region of the Czech Republic. It has about 1,200 inhabitants. The historic town centre is well preserved and is protected as an urban monument zone.

== Administrative division ==
Potštát consists of five municipal parts (in brackets population according to the 2021 census):

- Potštát (684)
- Boškov (96)
- Kovářov (105)
- Kyžlířov (153)
- Lipná (93)

== Geography ==
Potštát is located about 25 kilometres (16 mi) northeast of Přerov and 27 km (17 mi) east of Olomouc. It lies in the Nízký Jeseník range. The highest point is at 614 m (2,014 ft) above sea level. The upper course of the Velička Stream flows through the town.

== History ==
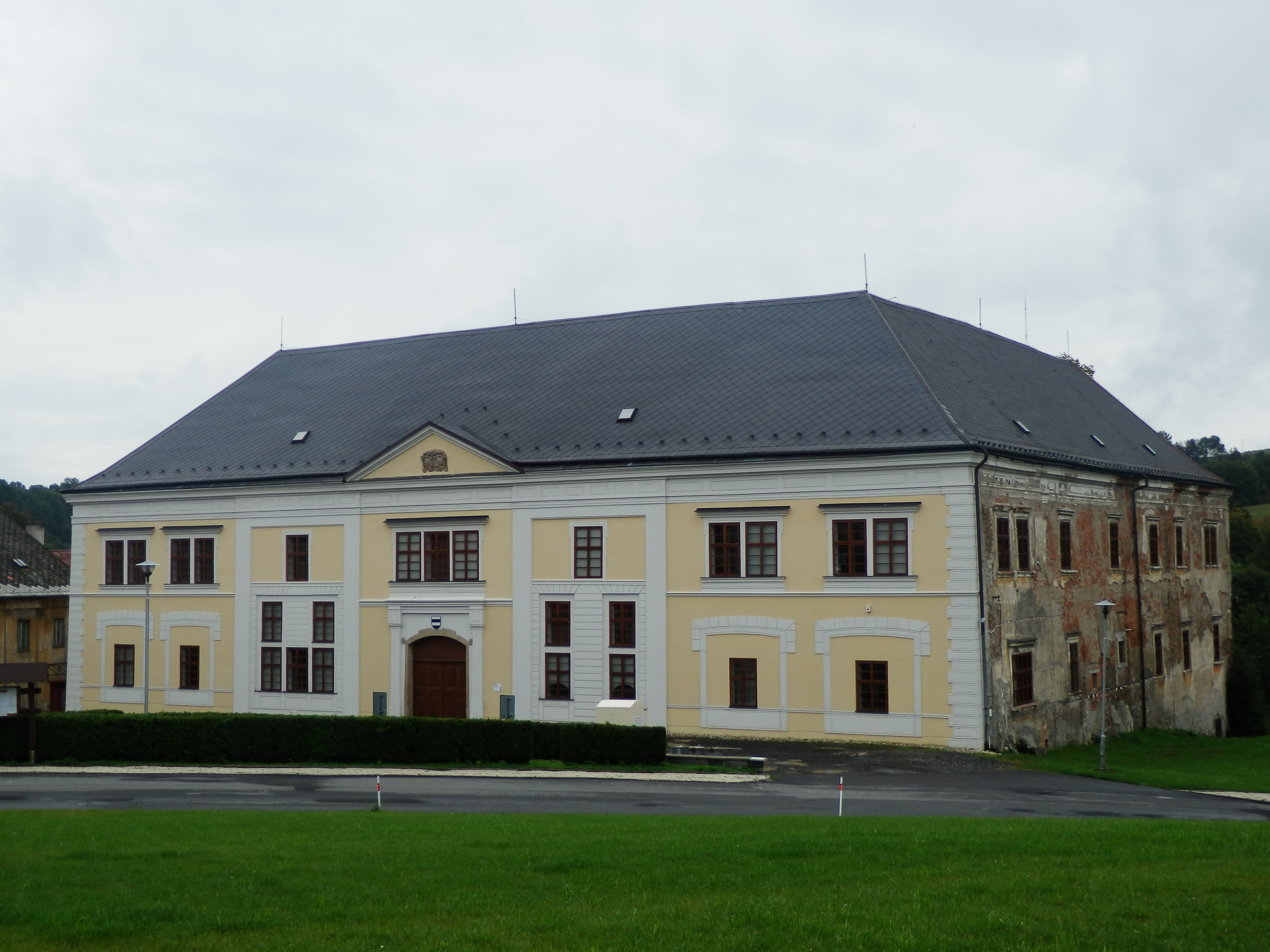
Potštát Castle

The first written mention of Potštát is in a deed from a period between 1318 and 1322, where it is already referred to as a town. In the second half of the 14th century, Potštát was acquired by the Kunštát and Poděbrady family. The town obtained the brewing privilege by Boček II of Poděbrady in 1388. The town flourished and crafts developed. In 1408, Tas of Prusinovice bought Potštát. During the rule of the Prusinovice family, the town further developed.

For participating in the Bohemian Revolt, their properties were confiscated and Potštát was donated to illegitimate daughter of Rudolf II, Karolina d'Austria. During the Thirty Years' War in 1642–1645, the town was looted and damaged five times by various armies. In the 1660s, Potštát was bought by the Walderode family, who restored the town in the Baroque spirit and gave the square its present appearance. The town's economy relied on crafts, especially cloth making, weaving and shoemaking.

Potšát was affected by the Seven Years' War and by the Napoleonic Wars, during which many young people left. The town was also seriously damaged by fires in 1787 and 1813, which destroyed most of the buildings and the local castle. In 1814, Potštát became a property of the Desfours-Walderode family and recovered.

From 1938 to 1945, Potštát was annexed by Nazi Germany and administered as part of the Reichsgau Sudetenland.

== Demographics ==
Historical population

Year	Pop.	±%
1869	3,594	—
1880	3,531	−1.8%
1890	3,498	−0.9%
1900	3,453	−1.3%
1910	3,091	−10.5%

Year	Pop.	±%
1921	2,905	−6.0%
1930	2,886	−0.7%
1950	1,389	−51.9%
1961	1,614	+16.2%
1970	1,626	+0.7%

Year	Pop.	±%
1980	1,526	−6.2%
1991	1,294	−15.2%
2001	1,239	−4.3%
2011	1,154	−6.9%
2021	1,131	−2.0%

Source: Censuses

== Transport ==
There are no railways or major roads passing through the municipality.

== Sport ==
Ski Resort Potštát is a small ski resort near the town.

== Sights ==
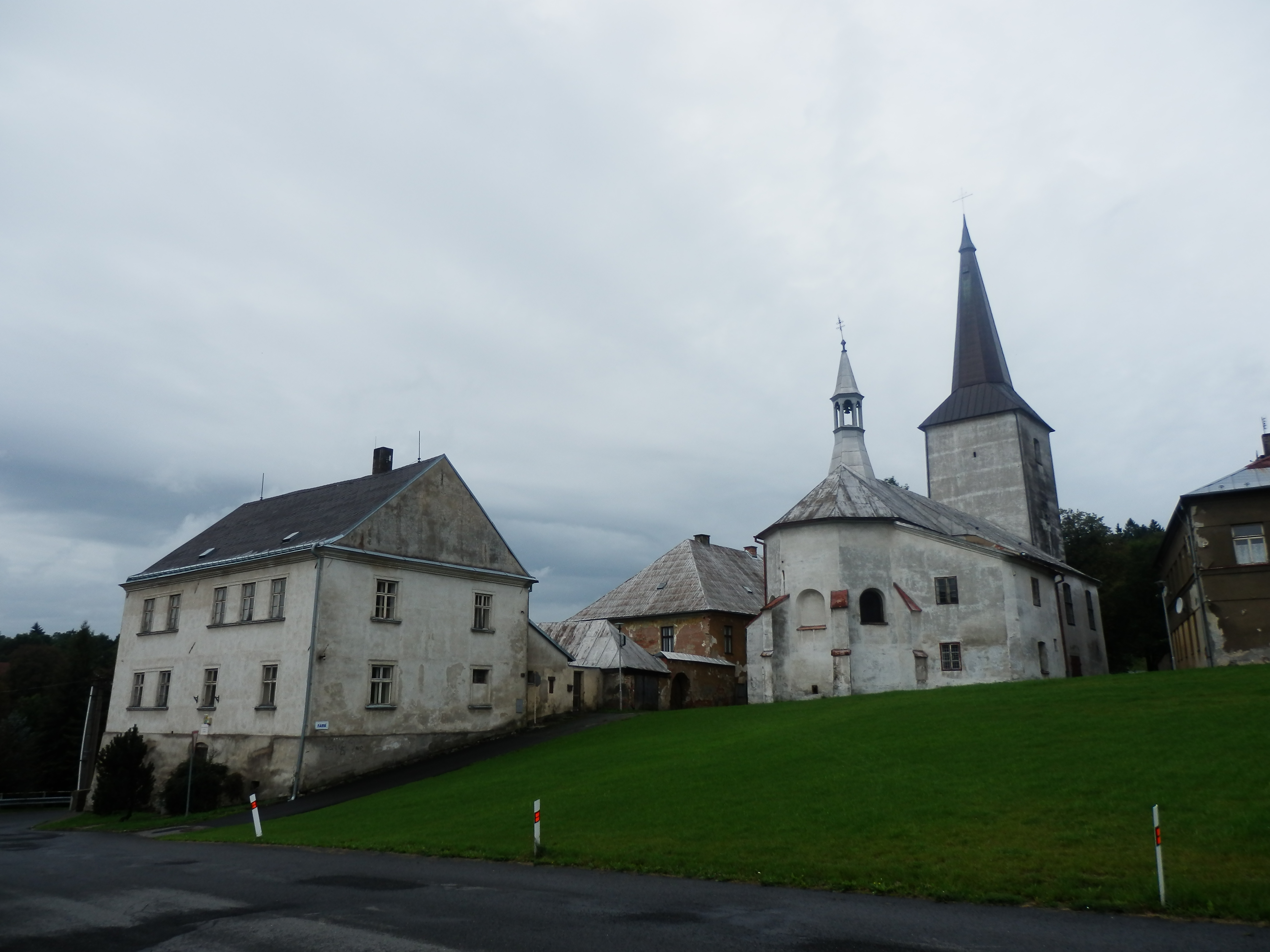
Church of Saint Bartholomew with the rectory

The main landmarks of the town are the Potštát Castle and the Church of Saint Bartholomew with gothic core. The church lacks a clock and in the middle of the town square there is a separate clock tower.

A fortress from the 14th century was rebuilt into a Renaissance castle by the Prusinovský family in the 16th century. In the 19th century, after it was damaged by fire, the castle was rebuilt in the Empire style. Today it houses the municipal office, a kindergarten, a library, and an exposition on the history of Potštát and its surroundings.

In the southern part of the municipal territory is located the Potštát Rock Town with lots of bizarre rock formations, and the ruin of the medieval Puchart Castle.

== Notable people ==
- Ernst Hampel (1885–1964), Austrian politician
