= Ernst Hampel (politician) =

Austrian politician (1885–1964)

Ernst Hampel (18 August 1885 in Bodenstadt, Austria-Hungary – 23 January 1964 in Oberfellabrunn, Austria) was an Austrian teacher and politician. Hampel was a member of the Austrian Nationalrat from 10 November 1920 to 2 May 1934, from the Greater German People's Party. In the 1930s, he joined the ranks of the Nazi Party's Sturmabteilung.
