= Alexandr Kliment =

Czech writer, poet and playwright

- Born: Alexandr Kliment; 30 January 1929; Turnov, Czechoslovakia
- Died: 22 March 2017 (aged 88); Prague, Czech Republic
- Occupation: Poet
- Spouse: Jiřina Klimentová (1932-1997)
- Writing career
- Notable works: Maria (Marie, 1960)

Alexandr Kliment (30 January 1929 in Turnov – 22 March 2017 in Prague) was a Czech writer, poet and playwright. He was a signatory of Charter 77 in 1977.

== Biography ==
In 1967, Kliment participated in a congress of the writers' union, which included Václav Havel, Ivan Klíma, Ludvík Vaculík, and photographer Oldřich Škácha. The writers' congress, which took place during a period of liberalism in Czechoslovakia, is considered to be a predecessor of the Prague Spring in 1968. He later joined with Havel and other Czechoslovak dissidents to sign the Charter 77.

Kliment died on 22 March 2017, at the age of 88.
