= Klokočí (Přerov District) =

- Municipality
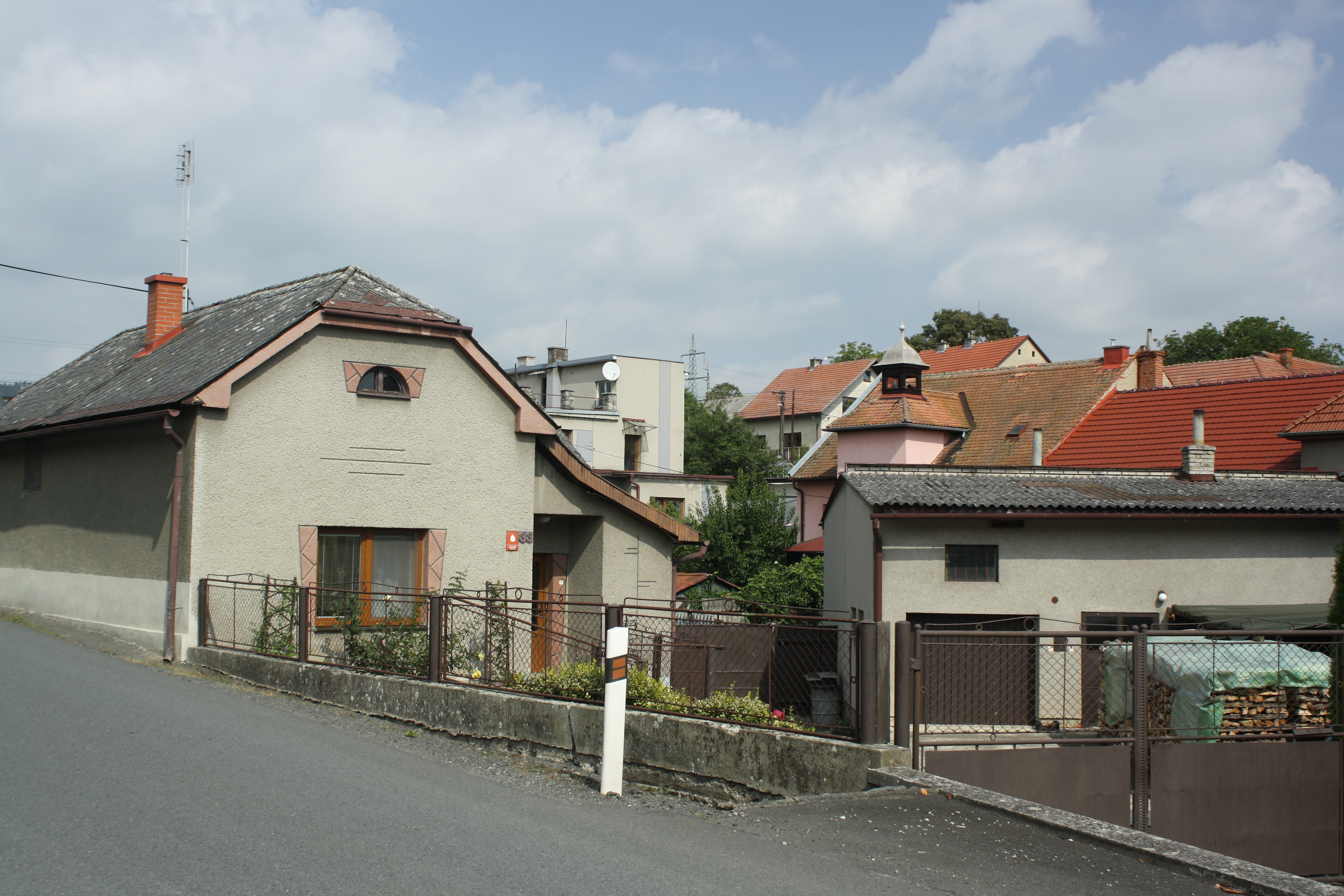
- Houses in Klokočí

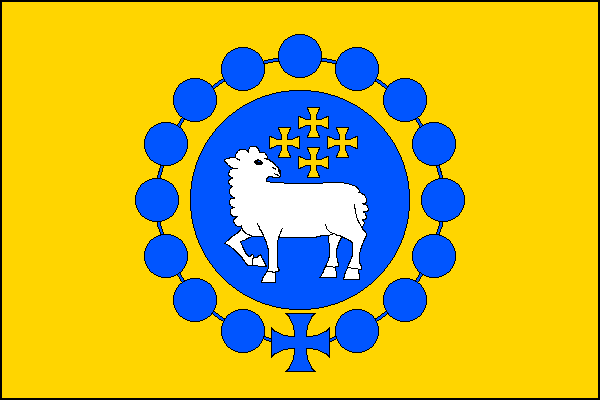
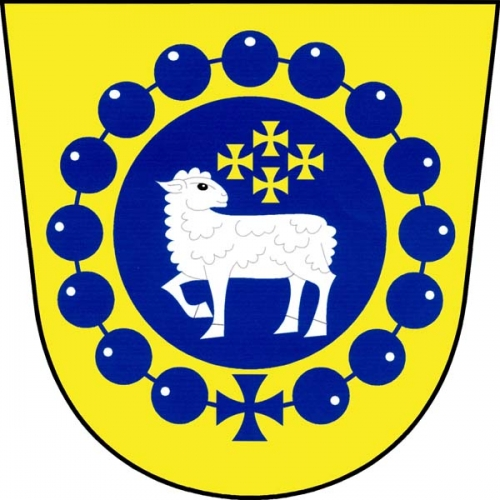
- Flag Coat of arms

- Location in the Czech Republic
- Coordinates: 49°33′37″N 17°40′56″E
- Country: Czech Republic
- Region: Olomouc
- District: Přerov
- First mentioned: 1371

Area
  - Total: 3.67 km^{2} (1.42 sq mi)
- Elevation: 278 m (912 ft)

Population (2026-01-01)
  - Total: 252
  - Density: 68.7/km^{2} (178/sq mi)
- Time zone: UTC+1 (CET)
  - Summer (DST): UTC+2 (CEST)
- Postal code: 753 61
- Website: www.obecklokoci.cz

Klokočí is a municipality and village in Přerov District in the Olomouc Region of the Czech Republic. It has about 300 inhabitants.

Klokočí lies approximately 19 kilometres (12 mi) north-east of Přerov, 31 km (19 mi) east of Olomouc, and 241 km (150 mi) east of Prague.

== Demographics ==
Historical population
Year	Pop.	±%
1869	225	—
1880	218	−3.1%
1890	255	+17.0%
1900	244	−4.3%
1910	247	+1.2%
1921	246	−0.4%
1930	264	+7.3%
1950	236	−10.6%
1961	246	+4.2%
1970	244	−0.8%
1980	261	+7.0%
1991	250	−4.2%
2001	246	−1.6%
2011	241	−2.0%
2021	242	+0.4%
Source: Censuses
