= Trosky Castle =

Castle in Liberec Region, Czech Republic

Coordinates: 50°30′59″N 15°13′51″E

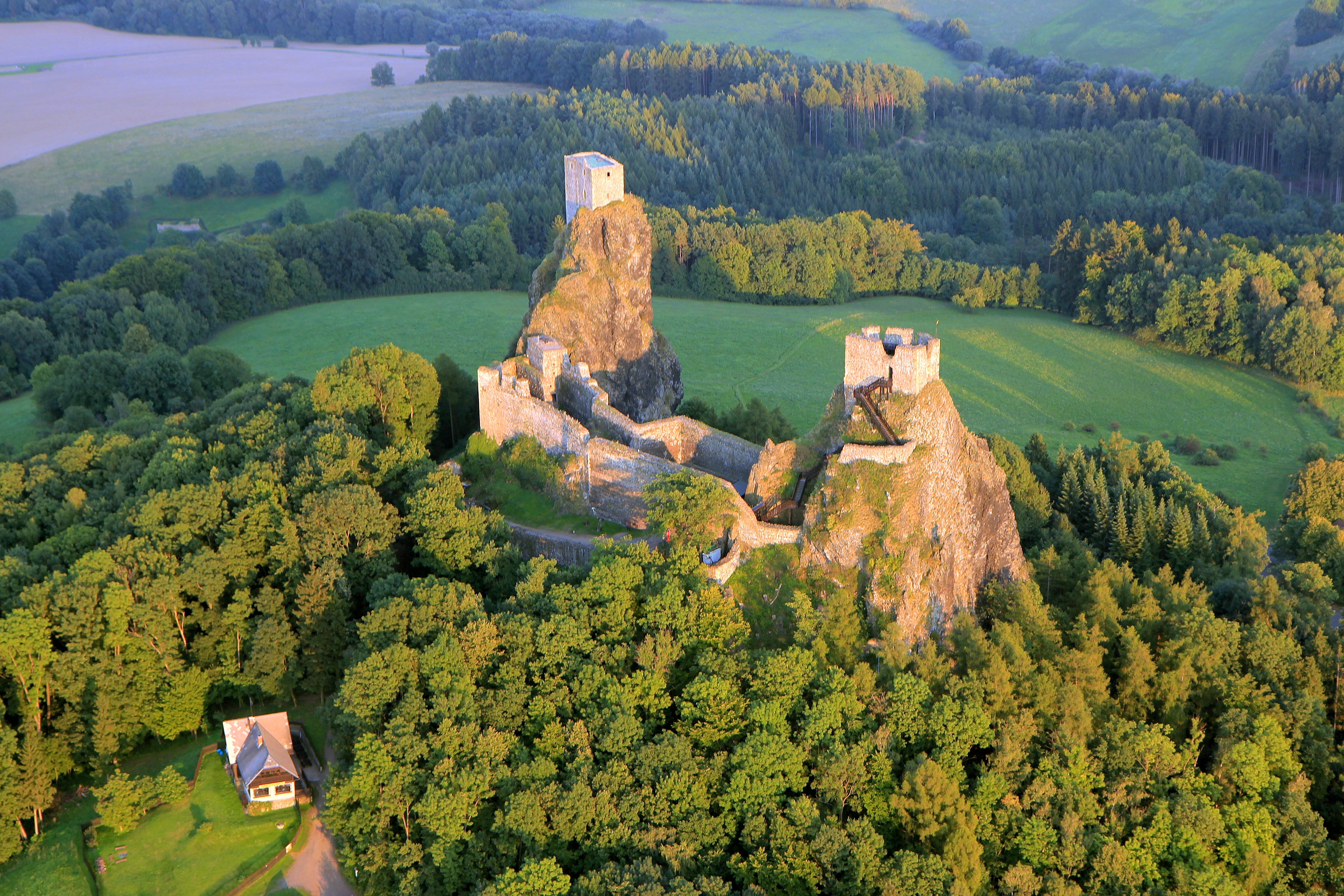
Aerial view of Trosky Castle

Trosky Castle (Czech: Hrad Trosky) is a castle ruin in the municipality of Troskovice in the Liberec Region of the Czech Republic and its name translates literally as "ruins" or "debris". It lies about 10 kilometres (6 mi) south of Semily. It is located on the summits of two basalt volcanic plugs. On the lower peak, 47 metres (154 ft), is the two-storey structure called Baba (Crone), and on the higher outcrop, 57 metres (187 ft), is the four-sided structure known as Panna (Maiden). The castle is a landmark of the Bohemian Paradise region.

== History ==
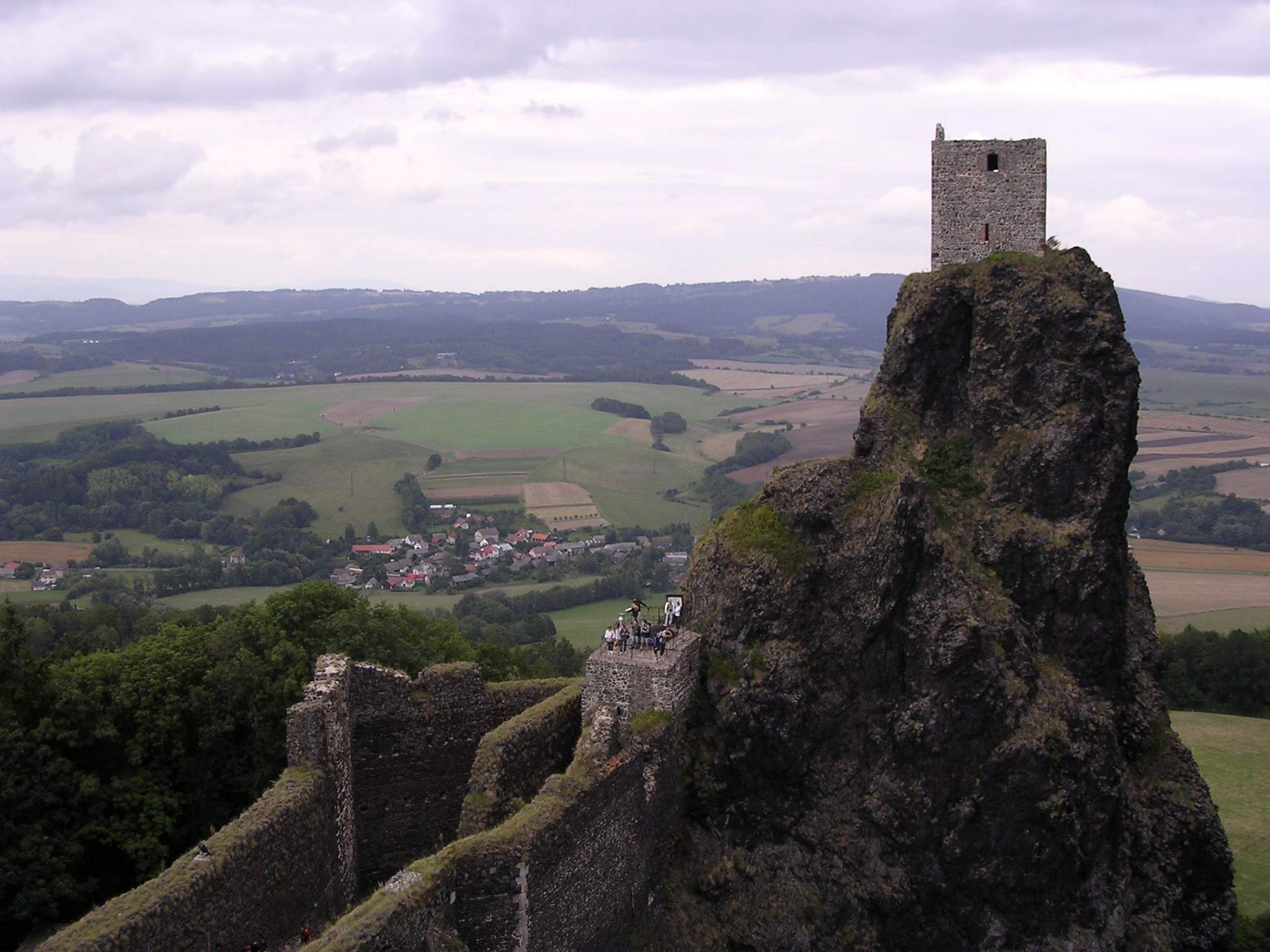
View of Panna Tower

The castle was established by Čeněk of Wartenberg in the second half of the 14th century. Two towers were constructed, one on top of each rock, and various residential buildings and outhouses were erected between them. Three rings of fortified walls protected the complex. According to archaeological research, the castle was founded significantly earlier than its first written mention in 1396, by which time Čeněk was already deceased and referred to with the epithet "of Trosky."

At the time of his death, Čeněk no longer owned the castle. Financial troubles in the early 1390s forced him to transfer the castle to King Wenceslaus IV, from whom it was acquired by Otto III of Bergau. Otto IV of Bergau, although posing as a zealous Catholic, raided the monastery in Opatovice and stole its famous treasure, which he is said to have hidden in Trosky Castle, supposedly in an underground cellar blocked by a huge boulder. No one could move the boulder, which was eventually covered by scree, permanently cutting off the way to the precious objects.

During the Hussite Wars, Trosky was a center of the pro-Catholic side, serving as a stronghold alongside castles like Kost, Kumburk, Frýdštejn, Bezděz, and Ralsko, providing connections between Bohemia and the Lusatian League. It is therefore not surprising that the castle was never completely conquered by the Hussites or any other enemies. As late as 1428, shortly after the castle burned down, it was under siege by Jan Královec, captain of the Taborites Army. From 1438 onwards, the robber knight Kryštof Šov of Helfenburg and his companion Švejkar settled in it to tyrannize the villagers in the surrounding countryside, before the people of Görlitz and Zittau, members of the Lusatian League, banded together to capture them. The conflict lasted until 1444 when Šov’s forces were defeated. The castle returned to Otto, who died soon after, passing the property to his son, Jan of Bergov.

Margareth of Bergau, the widow of the original owner Otto of Bergau, made Trosky into her residence by 1444. In 1455, Jan of Bergov sold Trosky to Jan Zajíc of Hazmburk at Kost, who incorporated it into the Kost estate. As a member of the Zelená Hora Alliance, he opposed King George of Poděbrady. In 1467, the royal army besieged Kost to force him into submission. This was short-lived, and in 1469, King George’s forces besieged Trosky, Budyně nad Ohří, Hrubá Skála, and Návarov. All the castles were conquered except for Kost. Trosky's garrison surrendered after August 28, 1469, and the castle was occupied by royal troops. However, Jan Zajíc reconciled with the king, his actions were pardoned, and his property was returned. Trosky remained in the family until 1497.

Afterward, several noble families owned the castle, including the Šelmberk, Bibrštejn, and Lobkowicz families. The castle's significance declined, and by the second half of the 16th century, it was no longer a noble residence but was managed by estate officials. The castle changed hands several times until it was owned by Albrecht of Wallenstein in 1622. In 1648, during the Thirty Years' War, the site was alternately occupied by Swedish and Imperial forces until it was burned down completely by the Imperial Army and left in ruins.

In 1681, the enlightened Jesuit Bohuslav Balbín visited the ruins, possibly the first documented example of a trip solely for historical research purposes. Despite its dilapidated state, Balbín noted that the castle was still repairable.

In the 19th century, interest in the ruins grew, and romantic modifications were made to the castle. It was decided to create a staircase leading to the Panna tower. Work began between 1841 and 1843, initiated by Jan Lexa of Aehrenthal, but was not completed due to his death. His son Alois attempted to continue the project but also died, leaving the work unfinished.

In 1925, the ruins became the property of the Czech state. Restoration efforts began as early as 1923, led by the Czech Tourist Club, focusing on repairing both towers, walls, and gates. Additional repairs were carried out in 1934–1935. In the latter half of the 20th century, professional interventions aimed at stabilizing the rock formations and remnants of the buildings. In 1999–2000, a staircase to the Baba Tower was constructed. In early 2024, restoration continued with new flooring in the Baba Tower and the construction of a new steel observation deck at the tower’s summit.

== In popular culture ==
A recreation of the castle as it existed in 1403 is featured in the Czech role-playing game Kingdom Come: Deliverance II.

== Gallery ==
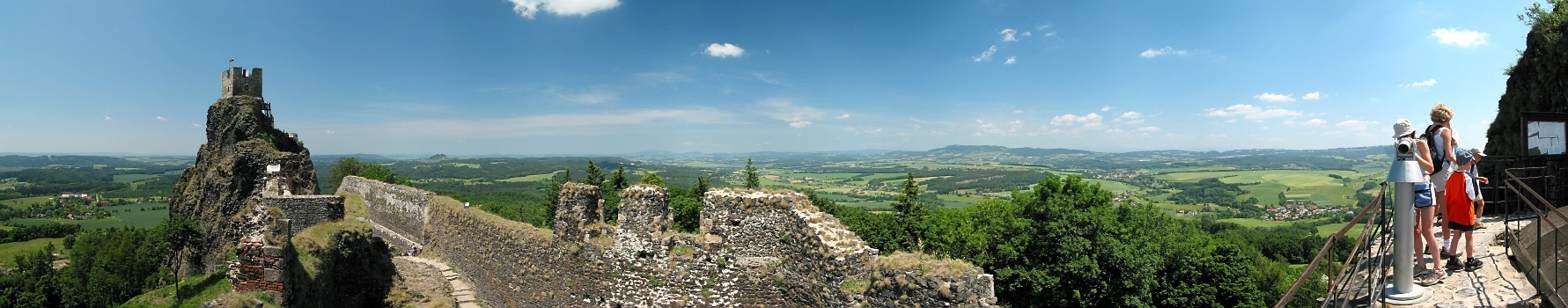
Panorama of Trosky Castle
