= Hrubý Rohozec Castle =

Hrubý Rohozec
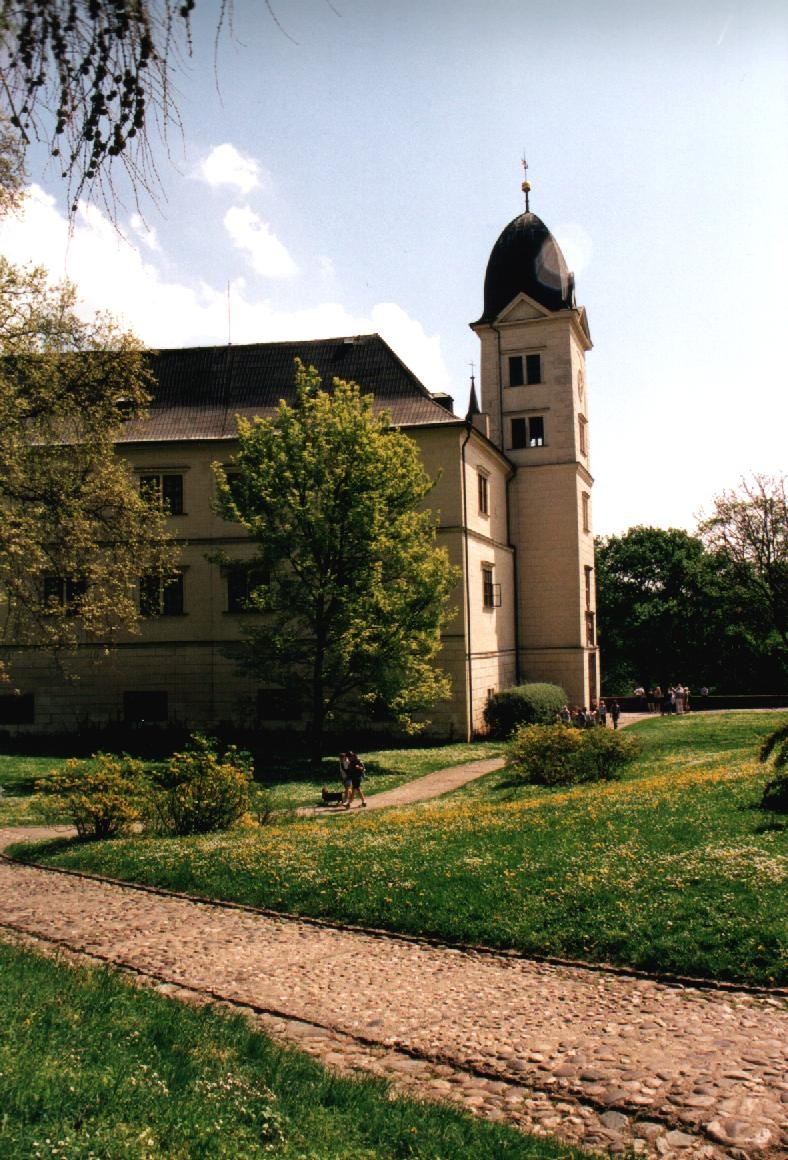
- Interactive map of the Hrubý Rohozec area
- Former names: Groß Rohosetz

General information
- Location: Turnov, Czech Republic
- Coordinates: 50°35′52″N 15°09′24″E

Hrubý Rohozec (German: Groß Rohosetz) is a castle in Turnov, Czech Republic. The original structure was connected to a polygonal tower by a defensive wall. Its purpose, in the 14th century, was to monitor the trade route running below it. Between the two parts of the castle, Gothic palaces were built by Jan von Šelmberk, and later Konrad Kraiger Kraigk. During the Renaissance, the Wartenberg family rebuilt the complex in the style of a château.

Albrecht von Wallenstein bought it in 1621 followed by the noble family Desfours, who held it until 1945. After 1822 the castle was upgraded on the basis of plans by the architect Jan F. Joendl. The castle's library, dining room, bedroom and a blue room are open to the public and display their original furnishings.
