= Klokočí (Semily District) =

- Municipality
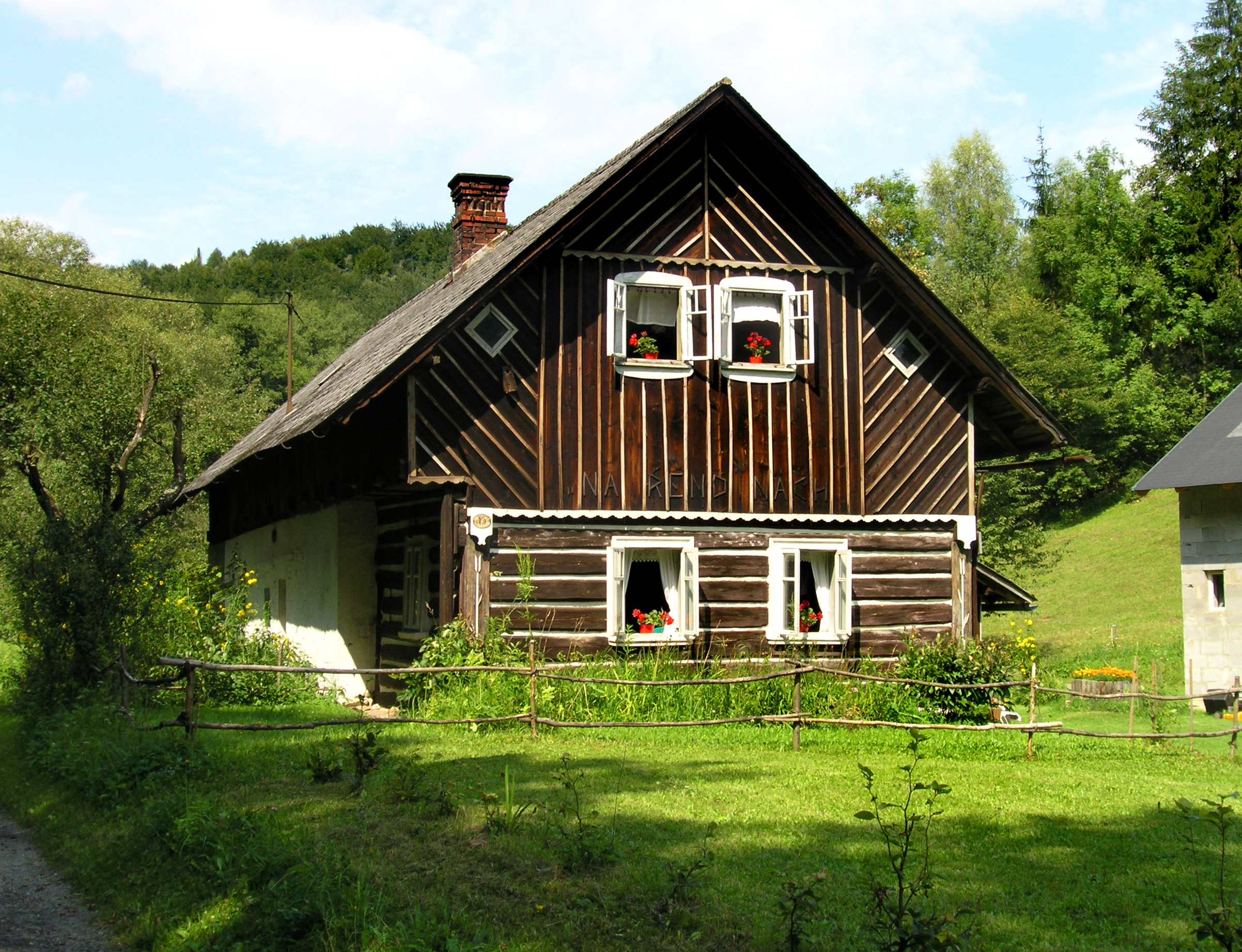
- Old timber-framed house

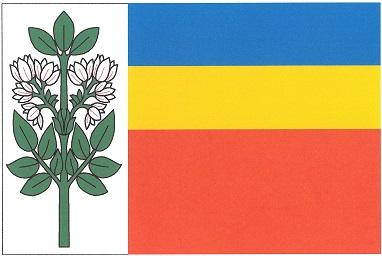
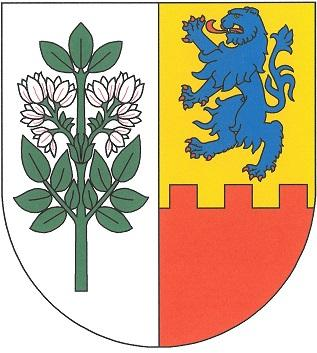
- Flag Coat of arms

- Location in the Czech Republic
- Coordinates: 50°35′59″N 15°13′18″E
- Country: Czech Republic
- Region: Liberec
- District: Semily
- First mentioned: 1312

Area
  - Total: 2.38 km^{2} (0.92 sq mi)
- Elevation: 376 m (1,234 ft)

Population (2026-01-01)
  - Total: 211
  - Density: 88.7/km^{2} (230/sq mi)
- Time zone: UTC+1 (CET)
  - Summer (DST): UTC+2 (CEST)
- Postal code: 511 01
- Website: klokociceskyraj.cz

Klokočí is a municipality and village in Semily District in the Liberec Region of the Czech Republic. It has about 200 inhabitants.

== Demographics ==
Historical population
Year	Pop.	±%
1869	267	—
1880	298	+11.6%
1890	340	+14.1%
1900	323	−5.0%
1910	311	−3.7%
1921	315	+1.3%
1930	302	−4.1%
1950	211	−30.1%
1961	178	−15.6%
1970	169	−5.1%
1980	156	−7.7%
1991	149	−4.5%
2001	157	+5.4%
2011	185	+17.8%
2021	184	−0.5%
Source: Censuses
