= Turnov =

Town in the Czech Republic

- Town
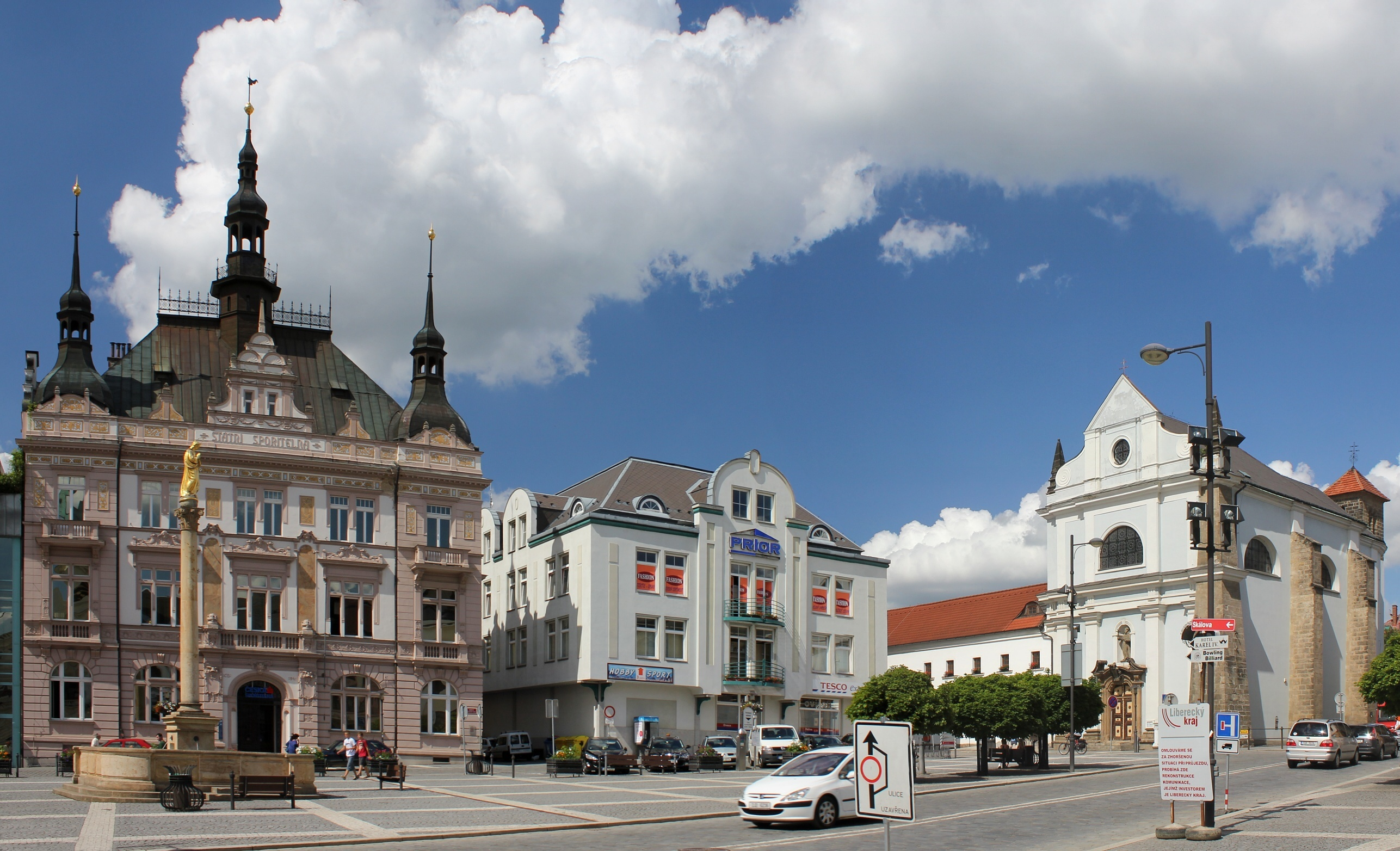
- The square Náměstí Českého ráje

- Flag Coat of arms

- Location in the Czech Republic
- Coordinates: 50°35′14″N 15°9′25″E
- Country: Czech Republic
- Region: Liberec
- District: Semily
- First mentioned: 1272

Government
  - Mayor: Tomáš Hocke (Nezávislý blok)

Area
  - Total: 22.71 km^{2} (8.77 sq mi)
- Elevation: 260 m (850 ft)

Population (2026-01-01)
  - Total: 14,607
  - Density: 643.2/km^{2} (1,666/sq mi)
- Time zone: UTC+1 (CET)
  - Summer (DST): UTC+2 (CEST)
- Postal code: 511 01
- Website: www.turnov.cz

Turnov (Czech pronunciation: [ˈturnof]; German: Turnau) is a town in Semily District in the Liberec Region of the Czech Republic. It has about 15,000 inhabitants. The town is located on the Jizera River in the Jičín Uplands, and is a gateway to the Bohemian Paradise Protected Landscape Area. It is an important traffic crossroads.

Turnov was founded around 1250. It is a traditional centre for gemstone polishing, glass craftsmanship and arts. The historic town centre is well preserved and is protected as an urban monument zone. The most important monument in Turnov is the Hrubý Rohozec Castle, protected as a national cultural monument.

== Administrative division ==
Turnov consists of 13 municipal parts (in brackets population according to the 2021 census):

- Turnov (11,261)
- Bukovina (131)
- Daliměřice (1,148)
- Dolánky u Turnova (33)
- Hrubý Rohozec (39)
- Kadeřavec (94)
- Kobylka (109)
- Loužek (9)
- Malý Rohozec (308)
- Mašov (660)
- Mokřiny (15)
- Pelešany (396)
- Vazovec (39)

== Etymology ==
The origin of the name is unknown. According to one theory, the initial name of the settlement was Trnov and the name was derived from the Czech adjective trnový (i.e. 'thorny'), referring to the local vegetation, but there is no evidence.

== Geography ==
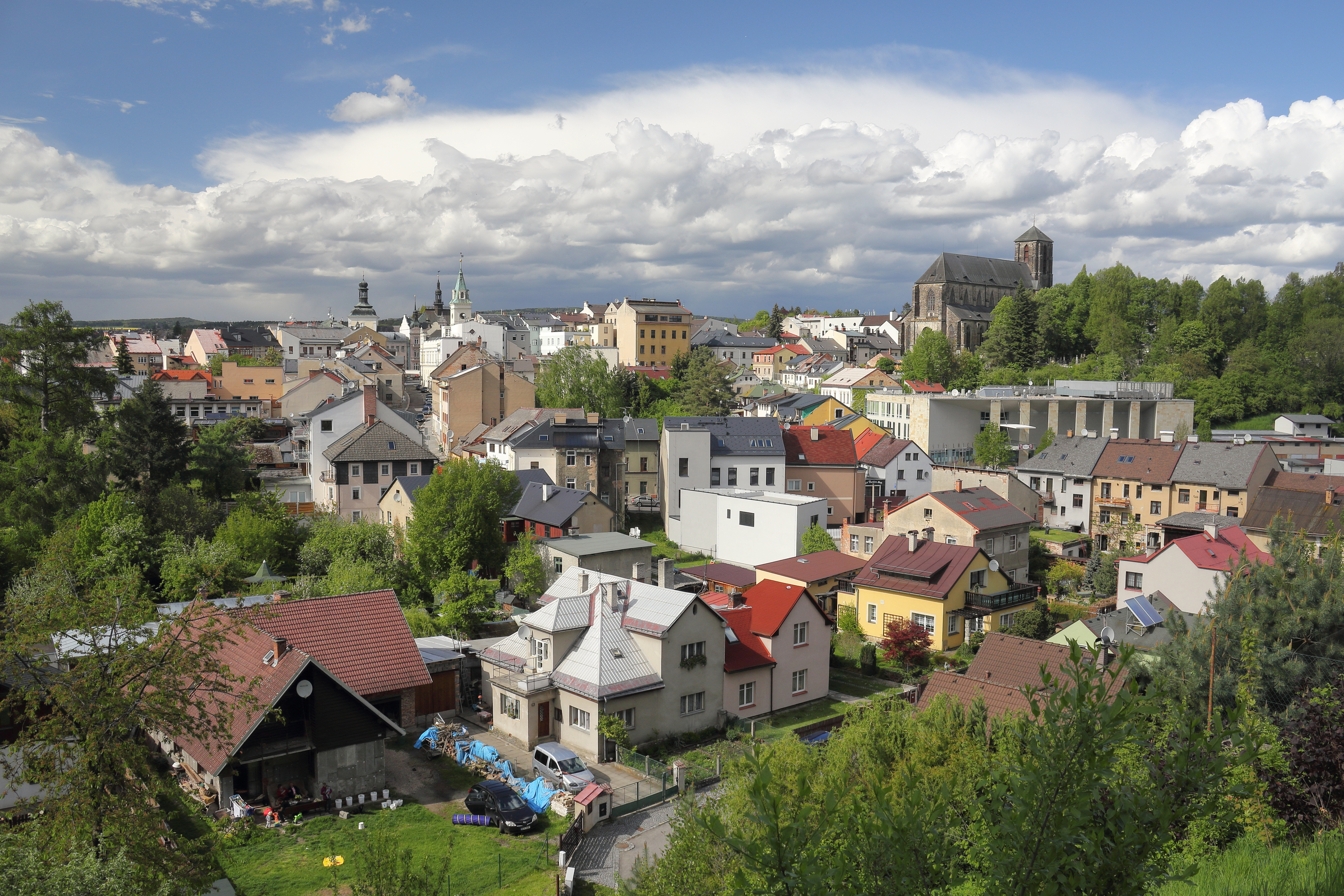
View towards the town centre from the south

Turnov is located about 19 kilometres (12 mi) south of Liberec. It lies in the Jičín Uplands. The highest point is the hill Cestník at 421 m (1,381 ft) above sea level. The Jizera River flows through the town. Turnov lies at the edge of the Bohemian Paradise Protected Landscape Area.

== History ==
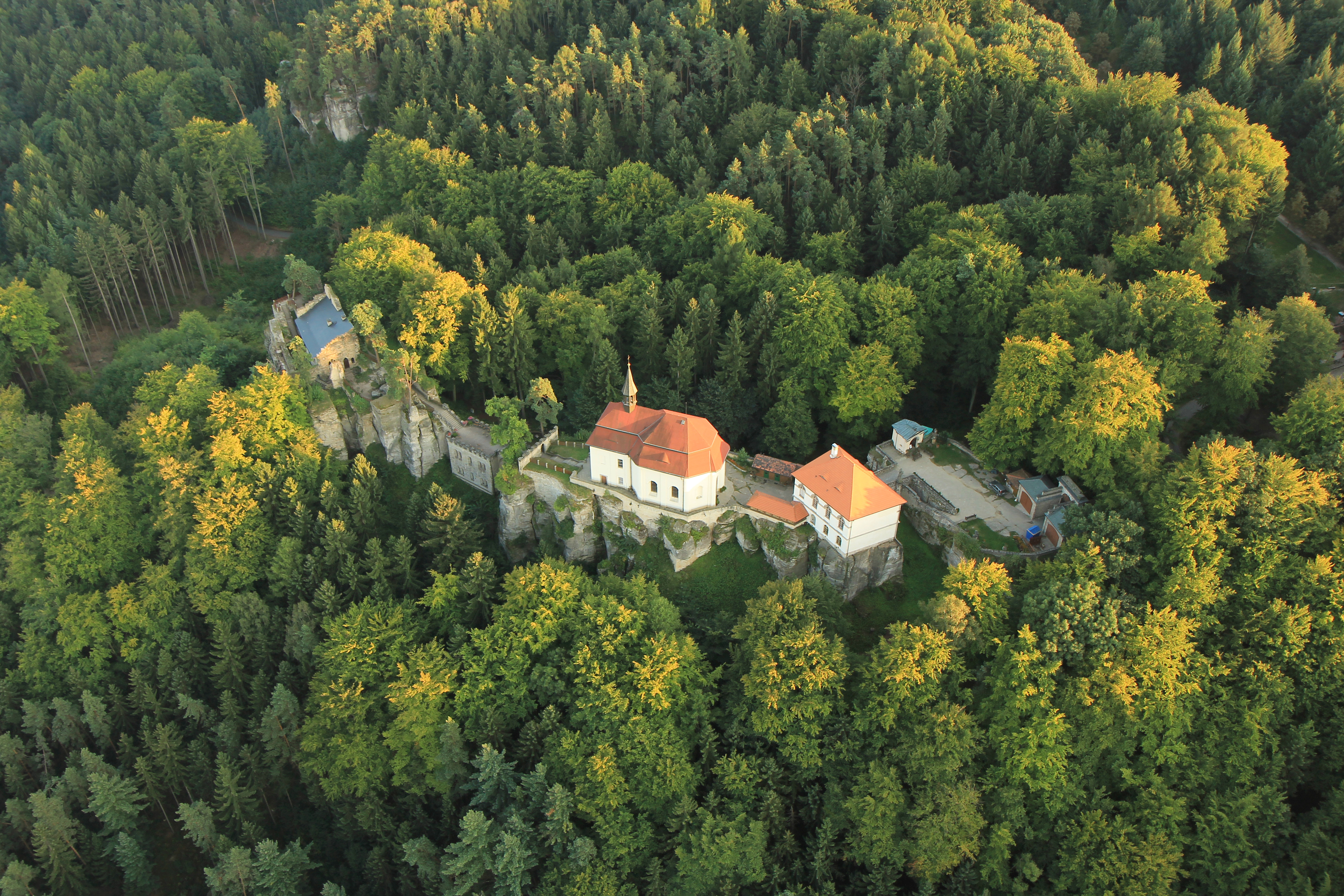
Valdštejn Castle

The first written mention of Turnov is in a deed of King Ottokar II from 1272. Turnov was founded around 1250 by Jaroslav and Havel of Markvartice on a spur of rock overlooking the Jizera River. A Dominican cloister was founded by Saint Zdislava, wife of Sir Havel. During the later medieval period, Turnov came into the possession of the Wartenberg and Smiřický noble houses. The medieval town was frequently vulnerable to fires – it was burnt by Lusatian crusaders in 1468 and during the Thirty Years' War by Swedes in 1643, as well as a conflagration in 1707.

Turnov has long been known for its expertise with gemstones. It attracted many medieval craftsmen and artisans who produced jewelry out the local Bohemian garnet. The first European technical school for the processing of gemstones, metals and jewelry, nowadays the Applied Arts Secondary School, was founded in Turnov in 1884 and still exists as one of the best schools of this type in the world.

=== Jewish community ===
The Turnov Jewish community was first documented in 1527. After it ceased to exist at the turn of the 16th and 17th centuries, new Jewish settlers were invited to the town by Albrecht von Wallenstein in 1623. The Jewish ghetto was established in 1647. Most of the Jewish population were killed during the Holocaust and only 19 of them returned to Turnov after World War II. The Jewish community officially ceased to exist in 1961.

== Demographics ==
Historical population

Year	Pop.	±%
1869	6,849	—
1880	7,245	+5.8%
1890	8,670	+19.7%
1900	9,028	+4.1%
1910	10,007	+10.8%

Year	Pop.	±%
1921	9,753	−2.5%
1930	11,541	+18.3%
1950	11,268	−2.4%
1961	12,270	+8.9%
1970	13,633	+11.1%

Year	Pop.	±%
1980	14,550	+6.7%
1991	14,398	−1.0%
2001	14,513	+0.8%
2011	14,472	−0.3%
2021	14,242	−1.6%

Source: Censuses

== Economy ==
The largest employers with headquarters in Turnov are Grupo Antolin Turnov (manufacturer of plastic products), Kamax (dealing with treatment and coating of metals) and Ontex CZ (manufacturer of hygiene aids), all of them with more than 500 employees.

== Transport ==
Turnov is an important traffic crossroads. The D10 motorway from Prague ends just beyond the municipal limits and runs through the town as the I/10 road (part of the European route E65). The I/35 road (the section from Liberec to Hradec Králové, part of the European route E442) also runs through the town.

Turnov is the terminus of the railway line Prague–Turnov. The town is also located on the interregional railway line from Liberec to Hradec Králové and Pardubice.

== Sights ==
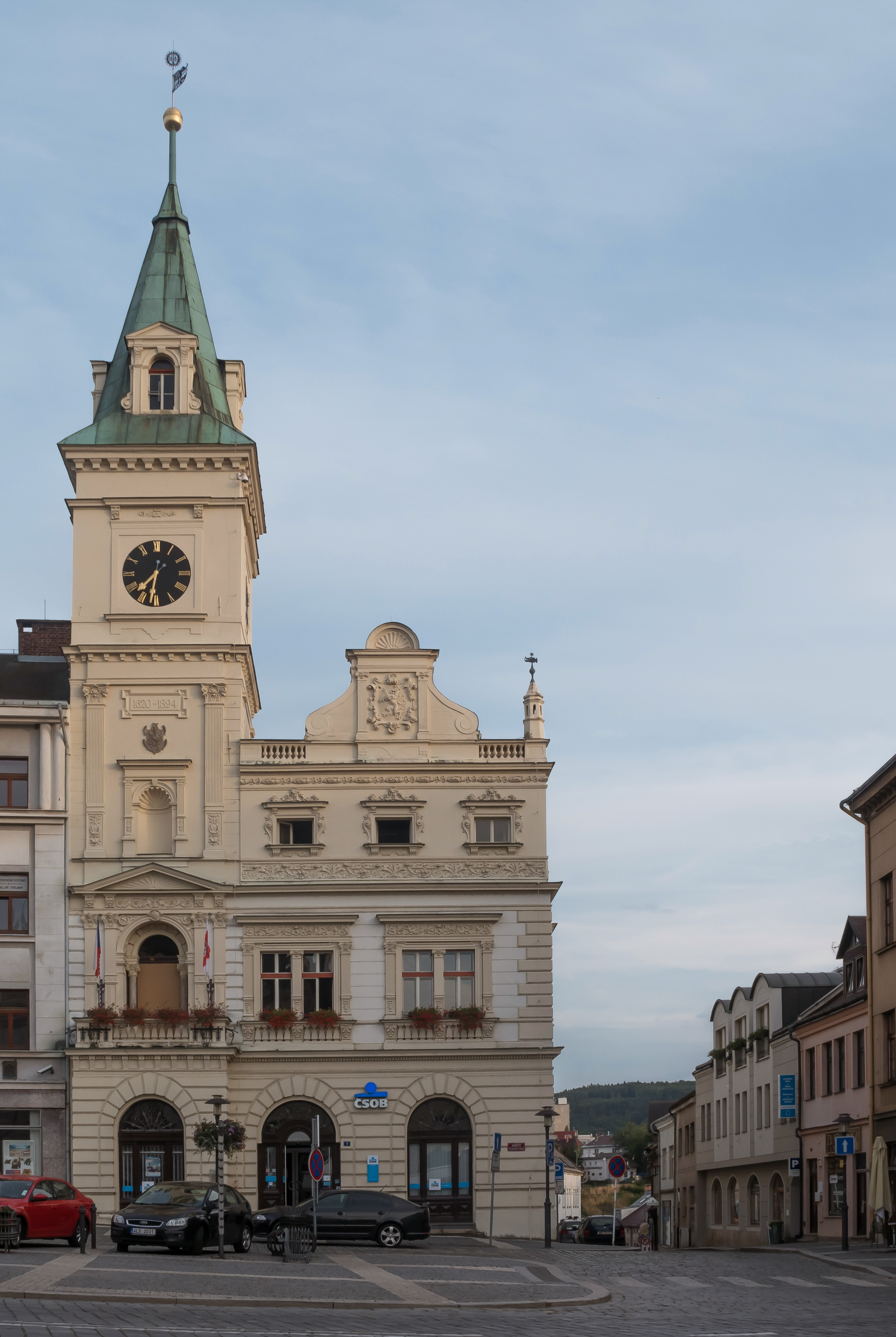
Town hall

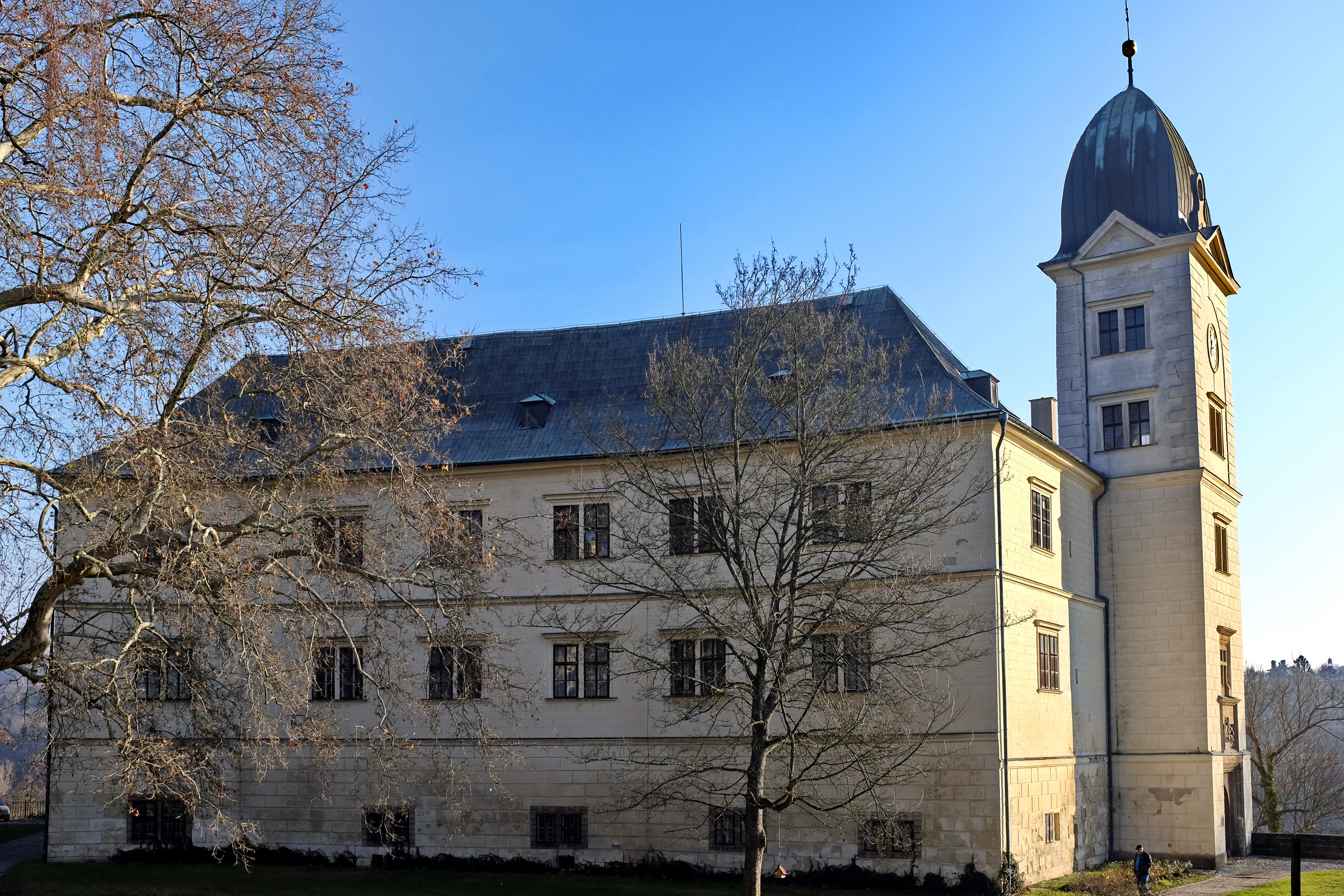
Hrubý Rohozec Castle

The Renaissance town hall in Turnov dates from 1562. In 1620–1621 it was rebuilt to its current late Renaissance appearance. The neo-Renaissance decorations of the façade dates from 1894.

The Hrubý Rohozec Castle is located in the Hrubý Rohozec part of Turnov. It was founded in the first half of the 14th century. In 1534–1621, the medieval castle was rebuilt into a Renaissance residence. Baroque modifications were made in 1627 and Neoclassical modifications were made in 1822. Today the castle is owned by the state. It is open to the public and offers guided tours. It is protected as a national cultural monument.

The Valdštejn Castle, known as the cradle of the Waldstein family, is located in the woods in the southern part of the municipal territory, near Pelešany. This Gothic castle was founded in the second half of the 13th century, but it became abandoned in the 16th century. In the 17th and 18th centuries, the castle was the home of hermits, and in 1722, the Chapel of Saint John of Nepomuk was built in the central part of the castle, and a new Baroque access bridge was also built. The castle is open to the public.

Museum of the Bohemian Paradise in Turnov has a significant collection of gemstones and jewelry, as well as exhibits on geology, archaeology and folklore. It was founded in 1886.

== Religious monuments ==
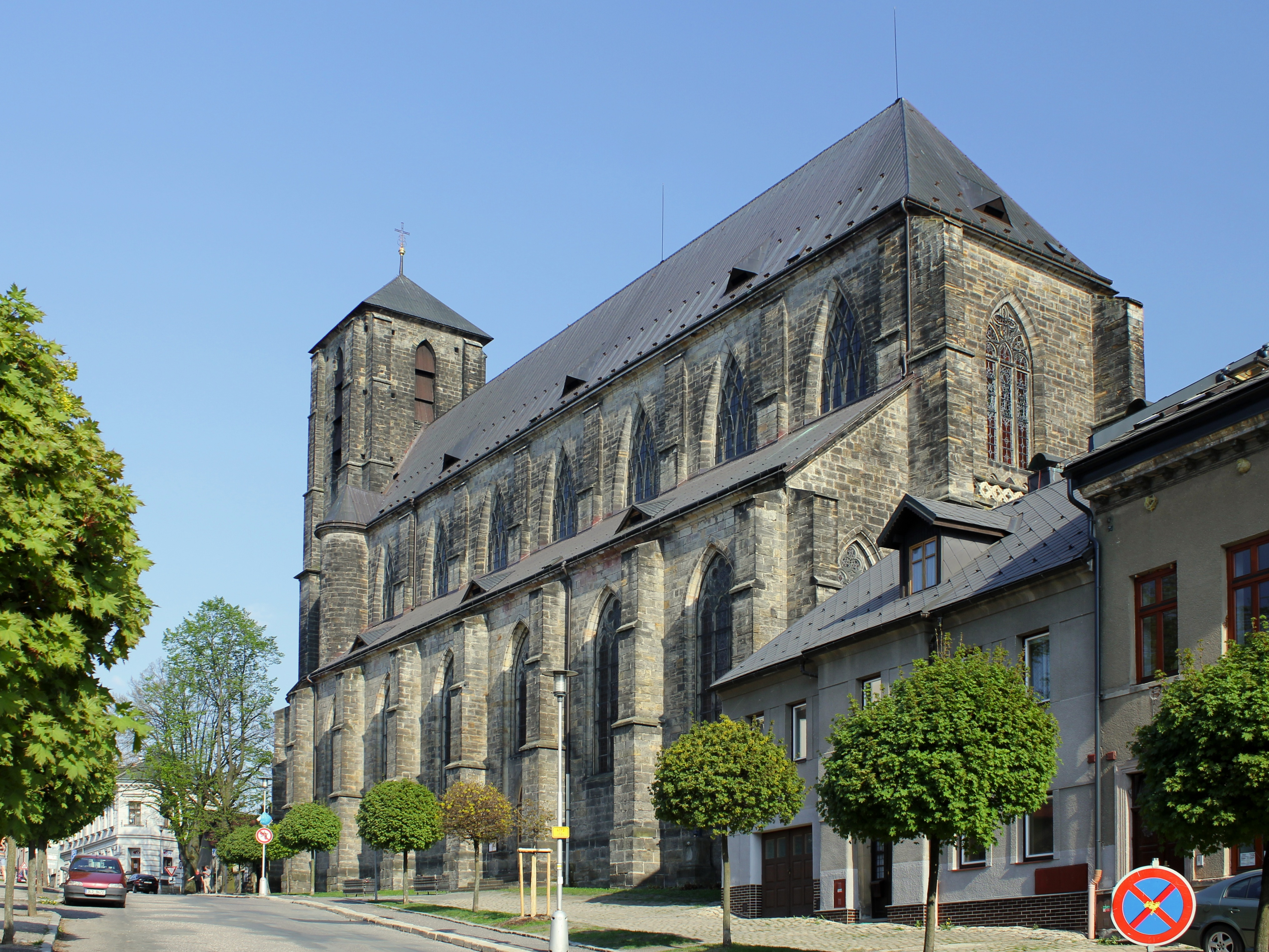
Church of the Nativity of the Virgin Mary

The Church of the Nativity of the Virgin Mary was built shortly after the foundation of Turnov, together with the Dominican monastery. It was damaged in the Hussite Wars and by fire in the 17th century, and although it was repaired several times, it had to be demolished in 1825 due to its poor condition. The current Church of the Nativity of the Virgin Mary was built in the neo-Gothic style in 1825–1853 and is one of the most valuable parts of the historic town centre.

The Church of Saint Nicholas has a Gothic core from the second half of the 14th century. It was reconstructed in the Renaissance style in 1535 and then in the Baroque style in 1722. The Gothic tower of the church used to be a part of the town walls.

The Church of Saint Francis of Assisi is an early Baroque building. It was built in 1651–1655 together with the Franciscan monastery, expanded in 1684–1685. Its current appearance is a result of the reconstruction after the 1707 fire.

The former synagogue in Turnov dates from 1779. Between the 1950s and 2003, the building was used as a warehouse. In 2003, the building was bought by the Town of Turnov and it was restored to become a concert place and a memorial. The Jewish cemetery was founded in the 17th century. The oldest preserved tombstone dates from 1649.

== Notable people ==
- Ludwig Kraus (1857–1886), mathematician
- Josef Pekař (1870–1937), historian
- Jan Košek (1884–1927), footballer
- Jan Patočka (1907–1977), philosopher
- Alexandr Kliment (1929–2017), novelist
- Jaroslav Rudiš (born 1972), writer, journalist and musician
- Jan Farský (born 1979), politician
- Roman Koudelka (born 1989), ski jumper
- Adam Helcelet (born 1991), decathlete

== Twin towns – sister cities ==
Turnov is twinned with:

- Alvesta, Sweden
- Idar-Oberstein, Germany
- Jawor, Poland
- Keszthely, Hungary
- Murska Sobota, Slovenia
- Niesky, Germany
