= Úpské rašelinistě =

Peat bog in the Czech Republic

Coordinates: 50°44′9″N 15°42′30″E

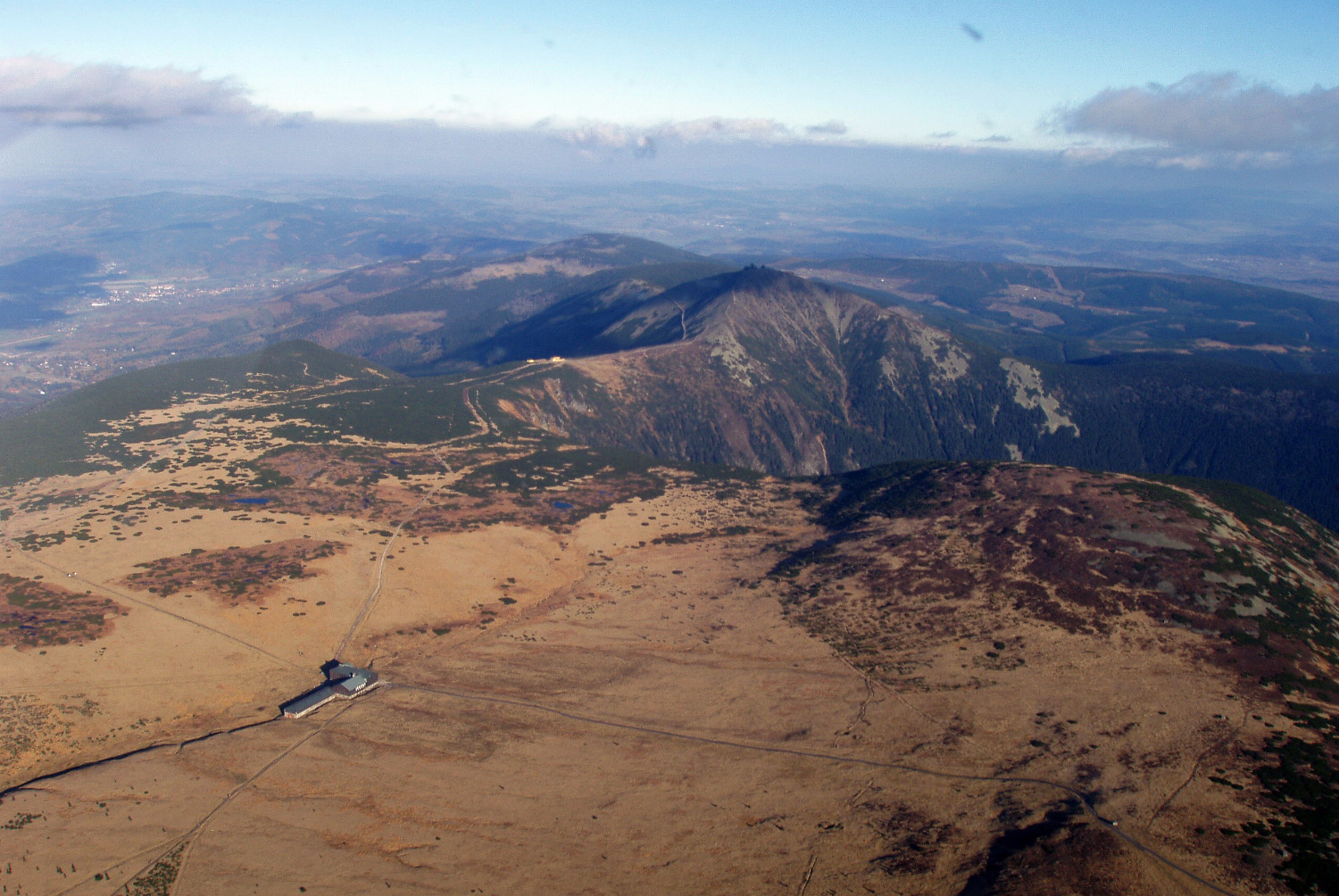
The peaks of the Giant Mountains between Luční bouda and Sněžka. The Úpské rašelinistě bog is visible on the left side of the image, featuring its two largest peat lakes—the larger lake on the left, located in Polish territory, and the smaller lake on the right, situated in the Czech Republic.

The Úpské rašelinistě (lit. 'Úpa peat bogs') is a peat bog in the Hradec Králové Region of the Czech Republic. It is the largest peat bog in the Giant Mountains.

== Geography ==
The bog covers an area of 73 hectares (180 acres). It at an altitude of about 1,420 metres (4,660 ft), on the Czech–Polish state border. It is located between the mountains Studniční hora and Luční hora, and the ridge Hraniční hřeben. The peat layer, which partially extends into Poland, reaches a thickness of up to 1.20 m (3 ft 11 in).

The area contains peat lakes up to one metre deep, with the largest on the Czech side measuring 834 square metres (8,980 sq ft) and the largest on the Polish side covering 1,544 square metres (16,620 sq ft). Additionally, peat mounds, known as bulty, are present. Water from the moor drains primarily into the Úpa River, with a smaller portion flowing into the Bílé Labe River.

The Úpské rašelinistě is one of the best-known among approximately sixty peat bogs found on the plateaus of the Giant Mountains. Its characteristics resemble peat bogs in northern Europe.

== Flora and fauna ==
The vegetation includes various sedge species, such as grey-leaved sedge (Carex canescens), bisexual sedge (Carex dioica), as well as mosses and other wetland plants. Several glacial relicts also thrive here, including cloudberry (Rubus chamaemorus), Krkonoše lousewort (Pedicularis sudetica), and Lindberg's sedge (Carex lindbergii).

The fauna includes:

- Mammals: Marsh vole (Arvicola amphibius).
- Insects: Hydroporus nivalis (a species of diving beetle), Patrobus assimilis (a ground beetle), Oligotricha striata (a caddisfly), and Dasypolia templi (a moth species).
- Spiders: Arctosa alpigena lamperti (a wolf spider species) and Bolyphanthes luteolus (a tarantula species).
- Dragonflies: Alpine stilt (Somatochlora alpestris) and azure hawker (Aeshna caerulea).
- Birds: black grouse (Lyrurus tetrix), bluethroat (Luscinia svecica) and dunnock (Prunella modularis).

== Protection ==
The Úpské rašelinistě is part of Zone I of the Krkonoše National Park, and is also listed on the List of Ramsar Wetlands of International Importance as part of the Krkonošská rašeliniště site, which has a total of 250.7 ha (619 acres).

Entry into the area is prohibited, but a blue-marked hiking trail passes through it between Luční bouda and the former Obří bouda.
