= Luční hora =

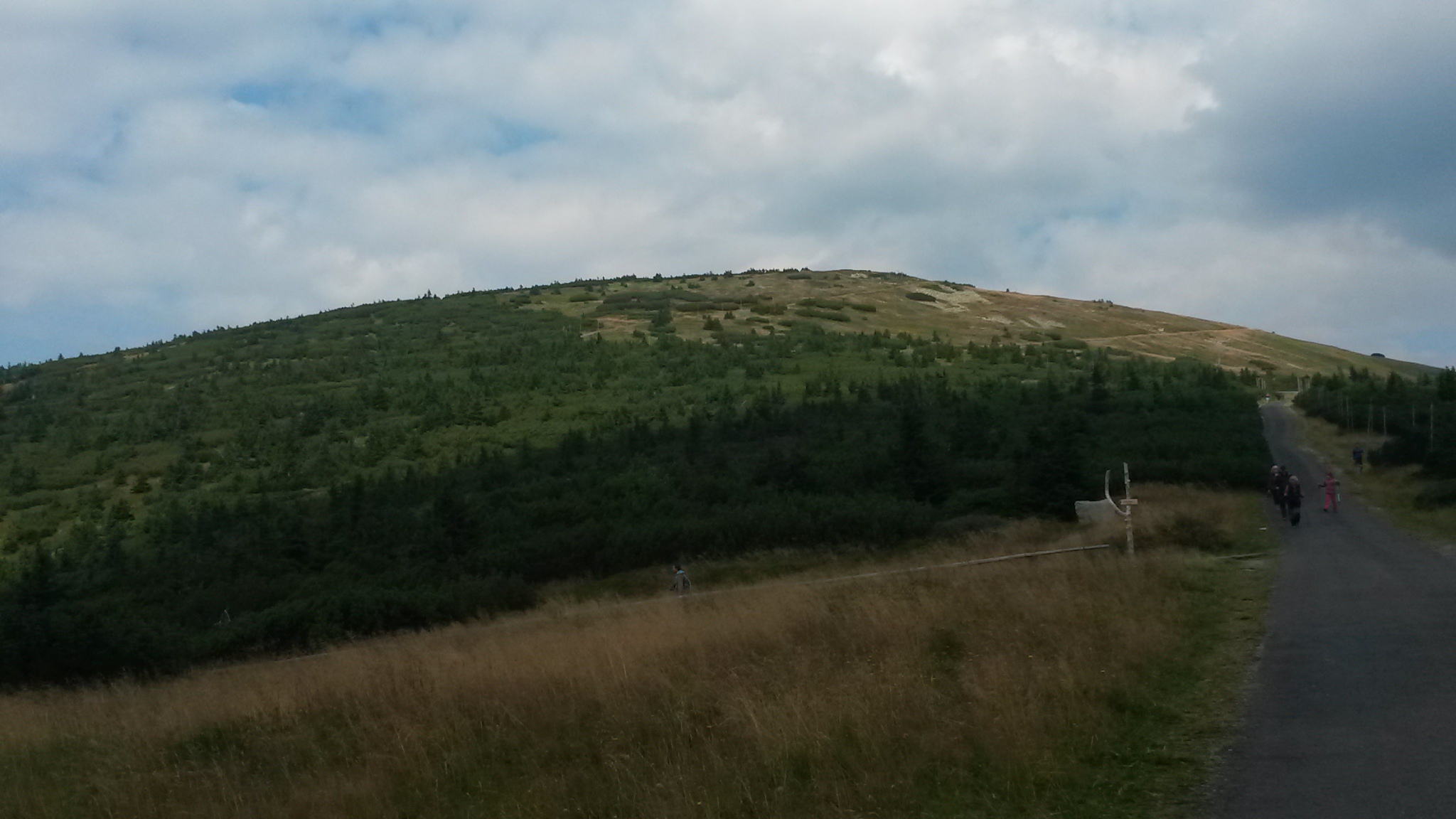
- Luční hora

Highest point
- Elevation: 1,555 m (5,102 ft)
- Prominence: 170 m (560 ft)
- Isolation: 4.2 km (2.6 mi) to Sněžka
- Coordinates: 50°43′40″N 15°40′57″E

Geography
- Location: Špindlerův Mlýn, Czech Republic
- Parent range: Giant Mountains

Luční hora (literally '"Meadow Mountain"; Polish: Łączna Góra, German: Hochwiesenberg) is a mountain in the Giant Mountains mountains in the Czech Republic. It is located in the territory of Špindlerův Mlýn. It is the second highest mountain in the Czech Republic. The mountain’s peak is flat and relatively broad. Avalanches are not unusual on the north and west faces. The mountain is located in Zone I of Krkonoše National Park.

Geologically, the mountain is formed of schist, shaped into clusters, intersected by quartzite. In the Czech Republic it is a unique example of cruised and polygonal soils. Cryoplanatial terraces and stone seas can also be found here.

== Spring area ==
Luční hora, along with ancillary Studniční hora, is a major mountain springs area. On the southeast slope in Sedmiroklí stems Modrý potok flowing into the Úpa. From the saddle between Zadní planina and Luční hora flows Svatopetrský potok into the Elbe. Some other smaller streams also flow into this creek. On the southern slope the stream Pramenný potok runs almost from the top of the mountain. On the southwest slope the streams Lovčí potok and Hrázní potok originate. To the north, numerous small unnamed streams flow down to the Bílé Elbe Stream.

== Surroundings ==
On the road to the Modré sedlo between Studniční hora and Luční hora is a chapel built in memory of Václav Renner, who died there in 1798. Currently, this memorial is dedicated to all victims of the Giant Mountains and on it are written all their names. Between the memorial and the chalet Luční bouda is Rennerův kříž (Renner's cross), commemorating the death of Jakub Renner in 1868.

On the slope of the mountain several bunkers were built in the context of the pre-war fortification works. The one that is closest to the top of the mountain is, thanks to its elevation of 1527 m, the highest located fortification object in the Czech Republic. Between 1937 and 1938 there was a military cargo cableway from Pec pod Sněžkou to supply material for the building of fortifications.

The northern slopes of Luční hora cover Bílá louka with a few bogs, on whose northern edge stands the chalet Luční bouda.

== Access ==
There is no marked hiking trail going over the top, so it is officially inaccessible. A path leads along the southeastern slope from the chalet Výrovka to the memorial of the victims of the mountains, and then continues to Luční bouda. From this route, winter pole markings slightly deviate. On the southeast slope is also a plaque dedicated to Soviet pilots from World War II. On the west and northwest of the mountain runs Old Buchar's Trail, which leads the red tourist trail connecting Luční bouda and Špindlerův Mlýn.
