= Litoboř =

- Municipality
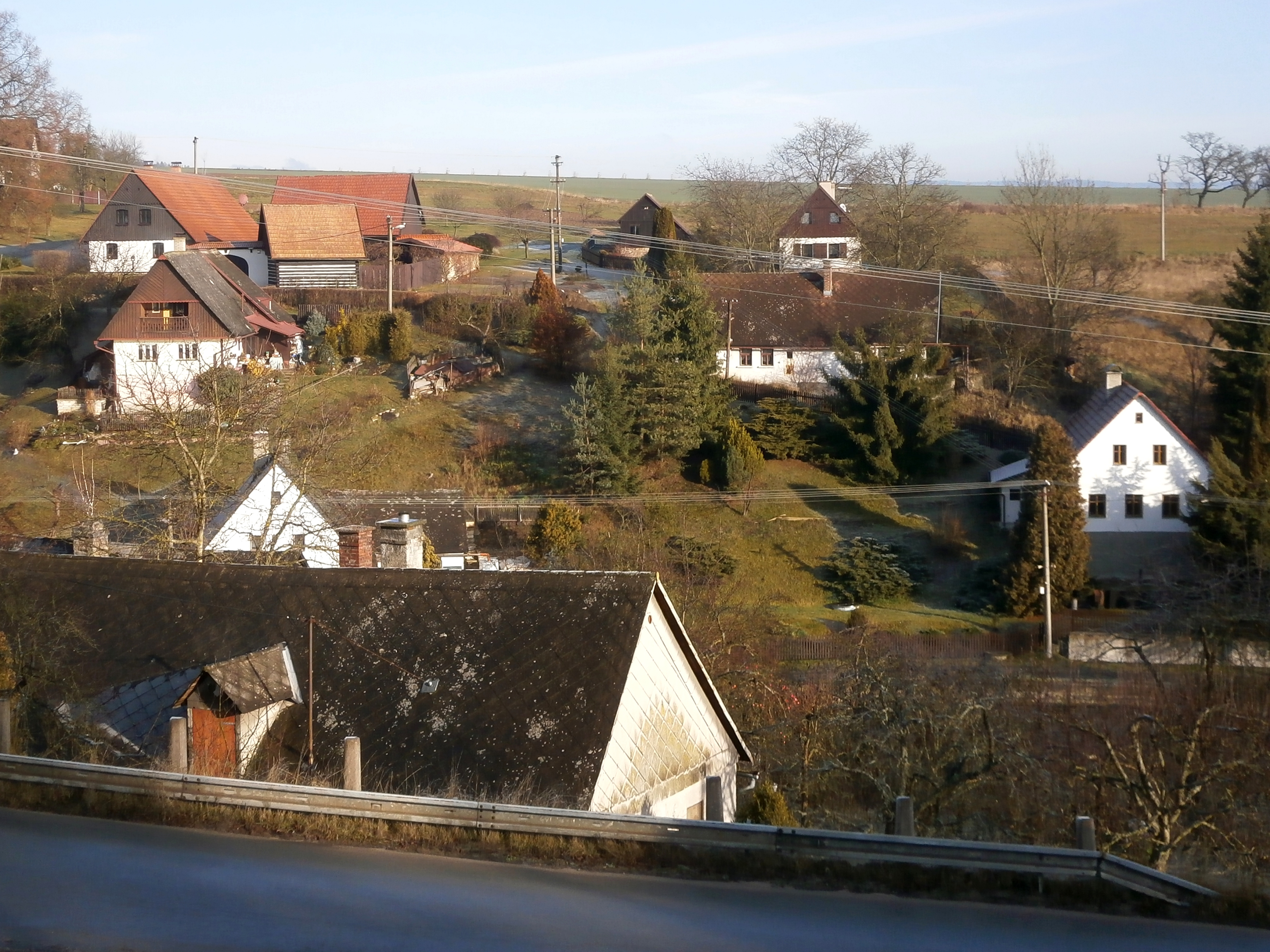
- General view

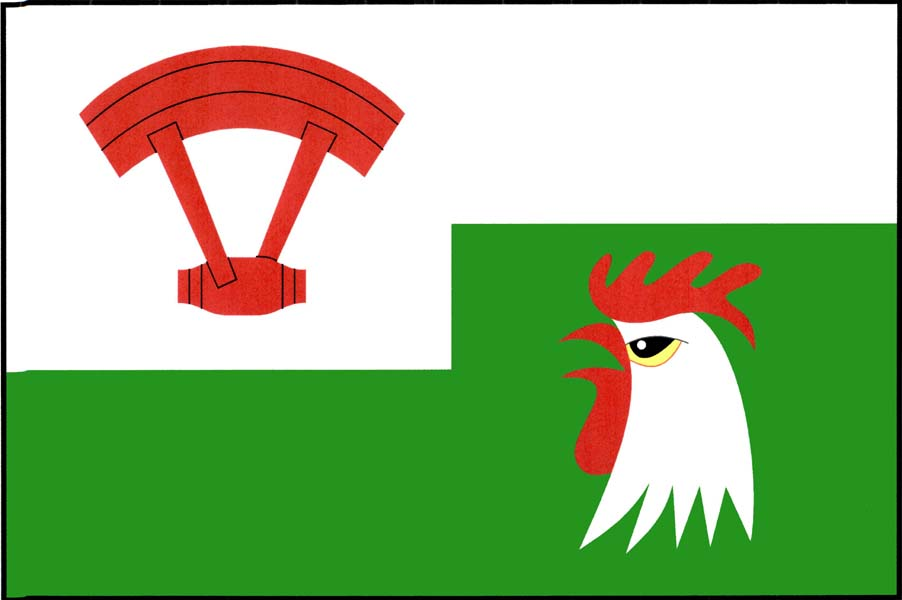
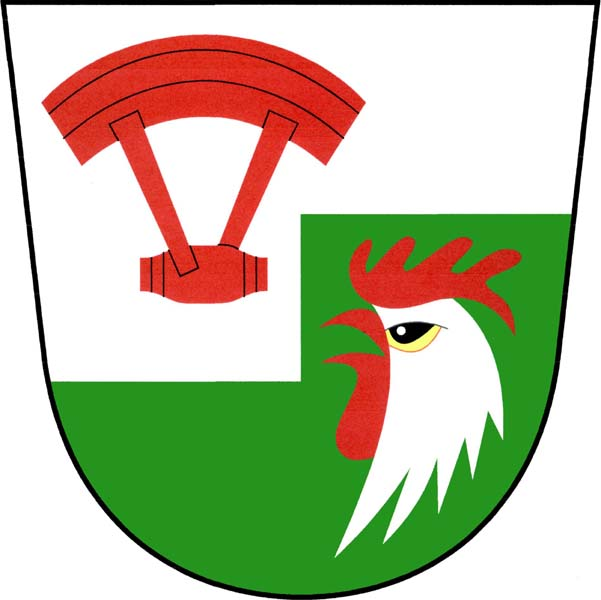
- Flag Coat of arms

- Location in the Czech Republic
- Coordinates: 50°27′0″N 16°0′55″E
- Country: Czech Republic
- Region: Hradec Králové
- District: Náchod
- First mentioned: 1369

Area
  - Total: 3.52 km^{2} (1.36 sq mi)
- Elevation: 394 m (1,293 ft)

Population (2026-01-01)
  - Total: 115
  - Density: 32.7/km^{2} (84.6/sq mi)
- Time zone: UTC+1 (CET)
  - Summer (DST): UTC+2 (CEST)
- Postal code: 552 05
- Website: litobor.webnode.cz

Litoboř is a municipality and village in Náchod District in the Hradec Králové Region of the Czech Republic. It has about 100 inhabitants.

== Etymology ==
The name is derived from the personal name Litobor, meaning "Litobor's (court)".

== Geography ==
Litoboř is located about 11 kilometres (7 mi) northwest of Náchod and 29 km (18 mi) northeast of Hradec Králové. It lies in the Giant Mountains Foothills. The highest point is at 465 m (1,526 ft) above sea level. The village is situated along the stream Hluboký potok, which originates here.

== History ==
The first written mention of Litoboř is from 1369, when there was a wooden fortress. In 1517, Litoboř ceased to be a separate estate and was annexed to the Rýzmburk estate. In 1534, when Jan IV of Pernštejn bought the estate, the fortress in Litoboř was already abandoned. From 1578, Litoboř was split into two parts with different owners. In 1613, one of the parts was annexed to the Náchod estate. From 1637, the entire Litoboř was part of the Náchod estate.

== Demographics ==
Historical population

Year	Pop.	±%
1869	538	—
1880	505	−6.1%
1890	512	+1.4%
1900	472	−7.8%
1910	495	+4.9%

Year	Pop.	±%
1921	382	−22.8%
1930	334	−12.6%
1950	244	−26.9%
1961	216	−11.5%
1970	157	−27.3%

Year	Pop.	±%
1980	130	−17.2%
1991	97	−25.4%
2001	94	−3.1%
2011	103	+9.6%
2021	93	−9.7%

Source: Censuses

== Economy ==
The municipality has primarily been a leisure destination in recent decades. Less than 40% of dwellings are continuously occupied; the other houses are primarily utilised for individual recreation.

== Transport ==
There are no railways or major roads passing through the municipality.

== Sights ==
The only protected cultural monuments in the municipality are field remains of a fortress, now an archaeological site, and a rural house from the end of the 18th century.
