= Obří důl =

Valley in Pec pod Sněžkou, Czech Republic

Coordinates: 50°43′19″N 15°43′37″E

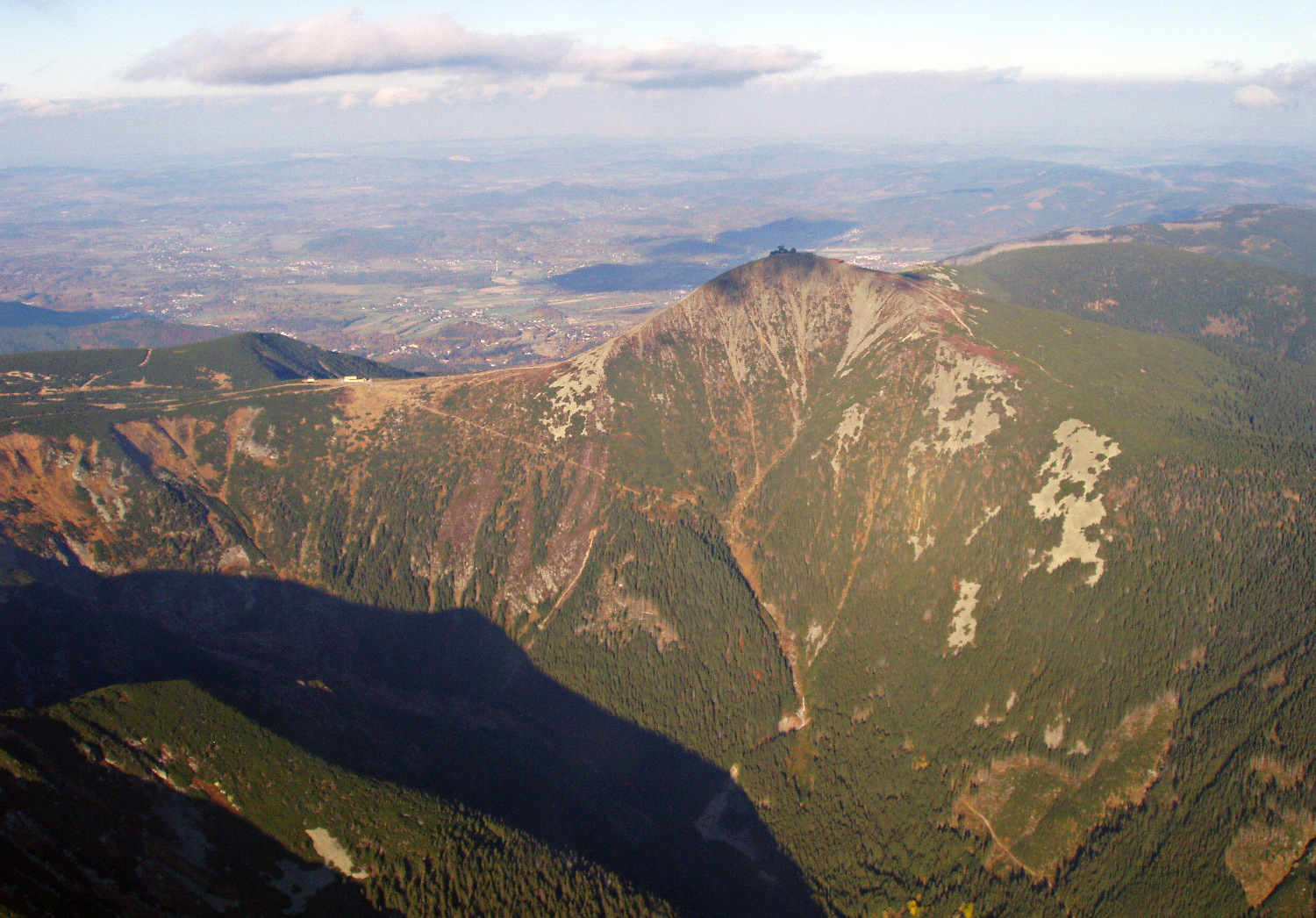
Sněžka with the Obří důl; Poland in the background

Obří důl (lit. 'Giant valley'; German: Riesengrund) is a valley in the Giant Mountains in the Hradec Králové Region of the Czech Republic. The valley lies in the municipal territory of Pec pod Sněžkou and within the Krkonoše National Park. It is a valley of the upper course of the Úpa River, stretching between the foots of the Sněžka and Studniční hora mountains. The valley was formed by a Quaternary glacier that reached a thickness of up to 100 metres (330 ft).

In the valley lie the ashes of botanist Karel Kavina (1890–1948), as well as the resting place of several unfortunate individuals who fell from the top of Sněžka.

== Úpská jáma and historical sites ==
Úpská jáma is a glacial cirque that forms the uppermost section of Obří důl. Its slopes rise up to 600 metres (2,000 ft) in height.

Historically, Obří bouda Hut stood on Czech territory since the mid-17th century but was demolished in 1982. On the Polish side of the border, the Silesian House, built in 1847, remains in use today.

Within Obří důl, there once stood Kovárna, a building constructed before 1568 as a mining forge. Over time, it was converted into a tourist restaurant and later into a nature conservation facility. However, it was demolished in 1979.

== Mining ==
From the 16th century until the beginning of the 20th century, the area was home to mines for copper, iron and arsenic ores. The Kovárna mine, located near the former Kovárna hut, has been open to the public since 2004.
