= Studniční hora =

Cumulus mountain in the Czech Republic

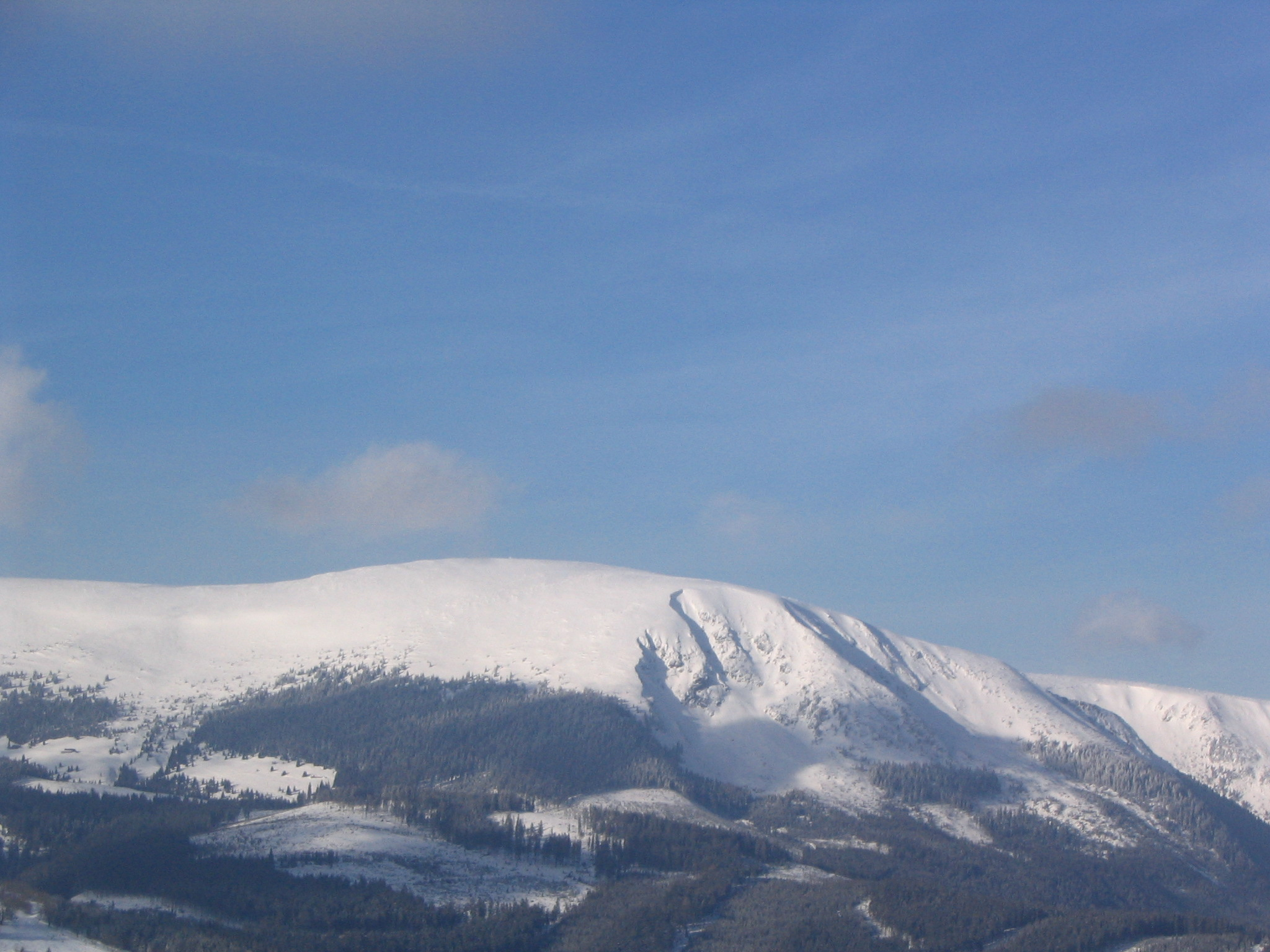
- Studniční hora in winter

Highest point
- Elevation: 1,555 m (5,102 ft)
- Prominence: 56 m (184 ft)
- Isolation: 1.7 km (1.1 mi) to Luční hora
- Coordinates: 50°43′37″N 15°42′22″E

Geography
- Location: Pec pod Sněžkou
- Parent range: Giant Mountains

Studniční hora or Studničná hora (German: Brunnberg) is a cumulus mountain in the Giant Mountains in the Czech Republic. With an altitude of 1,555 m (5,102 ft), it is the third-highest peak of the mountain range and the entire country.

== Etymology ==
Both the Czech name and the historic German name Brunnberg mean 'well mountain'. The Czech name for the mountain has been in use only since 1952.

== Location ==
The mountain is located in the territory of Pec pod Sněžkou in the Hradec Králové Region, near the Czech–Polish border. It is situated in the Giant Mountains within the first zone of Krkonoše National Park and has an altitude of 1,555 m (5,102 ft) (1,554 m according to older measurements), making it 55 cm lower than the nearby Luční hora. Access to the summit is prohibited.

Studniční hora lies approximately 1 kilometre south of the main ridge. Between the main ridge (which appears relatively inconspicuous from the north) and Studniční hora lies the Úpské rašelinistě, home to the source of the Úpa and Bílé Labe rivers.

To the west of Studniční hora is Luční hora. To the south is the valley Modrý důl. To the east is the valley Obří důl.

== Geomorphology ==
The summit itself is flat and rounded, with gentle northern and western slopes. In contrast, the terrain drops steeply toward Modrý důl and especially Obří důl, where several avalanche slopes are present.

The southern avalanche slope includes a snow field called Map of the Republic. The shape of the field resembles the shape of the territory of the First Czechoslovak Republic. Terrain modeling and wind currents make this the last place in the country where snow melts. The snow here often lasted until August or September, but in the 21st century, due to climate changes, the snow most often lasts until the beginning of July.

To the east and southeast of the peak, there are rocky glacial cirques, including Úpská jáma, Malá Studniční jáma and Velká Studniční jáma. Snow overhangs frequently form here during winter.

== Flora and fauna ==
Among the endangered species of flora in Minuartia corcontica. It is an endemic species found in on the eastern slopes of Studniční hora.

Studniční hora is home to black grouse (Lyrurus tetrix), which is an endangered and protected species of bird within the Czech Republic.
