= Luční bouda =

Mountain hotel in the Giant Mountains, Czech Republic

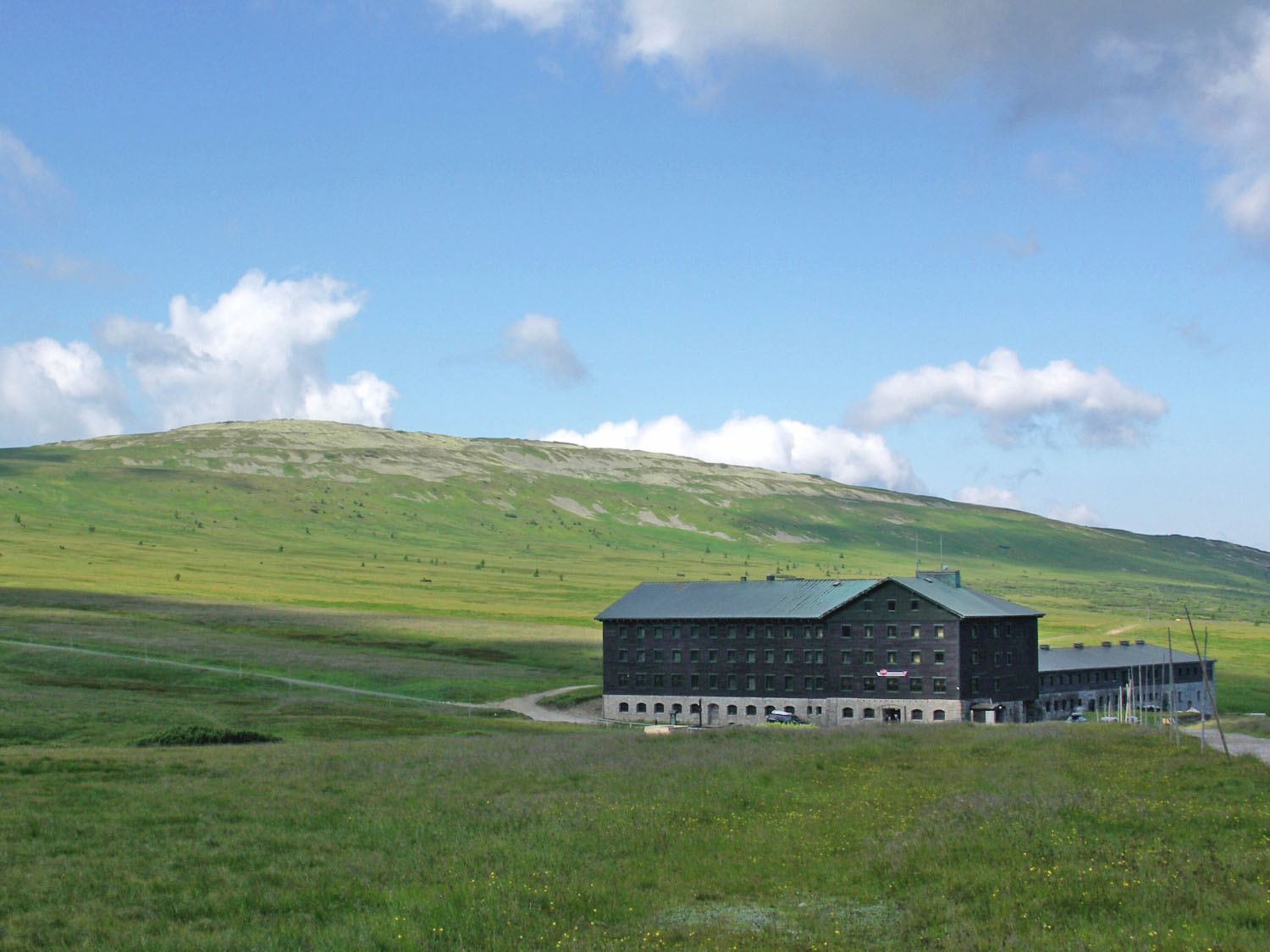
- Luční bouda
- Interactive map of the Luční bouda area

General information
- Location: Pec pod Sněžkou 203, Pec pod Sněžkou, 542 21, Czech Republic
- Coordinates: 50°44′4″N 15°41′49″E
- Construction started: 1623
- Management: AEZZ a.s.

Website
- www.lucnibouda.cz/en/

Luční bouda (lit. 'Meadow hut'; German: Wiesenbaude) is a mountain hotel in the Giant Mountains in the Czech Republic. The hotel, which has existed in various forms since the 17th century, is the oldest mountain hut on the Giant Mountains ridges and one of the largest in Europe. The current structure, built between 1939 and 1940, covers 5,600 m², though it has undergone several reconstructions since.

== Geography ==
Luční bouda is located in the territory of Pec pod Sněžkou in the Hradec Králové Region. It is located on the left bank of the Bílé Labe stream, west of the Úpské rašelinistě — the source of both the Elbe and Úpa rivers. It sits at an altitude of 1,410 metres (4,630 ft), approximately 1.2 km northeast of the mountain Luční hora (1,556 m above sea level) and 1 km northwest of Studniční hora (1,555 m above sea level).

== History ==
=== Earlier forms ===
The Luční bouda is the oldest mountain hut on the ridges of the Giant Mountains. In 1625, a farm building (a simple shelter for pilgrims) stood along the Silesian Road, a trade route connecting Bohemia and Silesia.

During the reconstruction of the mill wheel in 1869, a foundation stone inscribed with the year 1623 was discovered. Over the centuries, the hut burned down multiple times but was always rebuilt and expanded. It gradually developed into an important economic, commercial, research, and tourist centre.

The Renner family were notable owners of the hut. Their primary sources of livelihood included cattle breeding, hay harvesting from the surrounding meadows, and later, tourism, largely due to the proximity of Sněžka. A local specialty produced at the hut was mountain herbal cheese.

In 1914, a new, large hut with 120 rooms and several dormitories was completed. However, after the Munich Agreement, Luční bouda and the nearby Rennerova bouda burned down on 2 October 1938.

=== Appearance in 1939–1940 ===
During World War II, the hut was rebuilt by the German Wehrmacht and used for training air radio operators. However, only a small portion of the planned expansion was completed, resulting in a structure smaller than the pre-war hut. There is an unfounded hypothesis that the Germans intended to reconstruct the Luční bouda in the shape of a swastika, but this plan was never realized.

After the war, the hut was used by the Czechoslovak Army. Later, it was taken over by the Czechoslovak Physical Education Association, and after 1990, ownership transferred to the Czech Tourist Club.

=== 1990s and 21st century ===
In 1993, the Czech Tourist Club sold the hut to the company CDH Chrastava, which subsequently mortgaged it, including the land, to the bank Investiční a poštovní banka for nearly 48 million CZK. In October 2002, the hut was offered for sale in bankruptcy proceedings for 12 million CZK, with a debt discharge. However, it was known at the time that the exemption for discharging insufficiently treated wastewater, valid until the end of 2002, would not be renewed. The wastewater increased nutrient levels in the Bílé Labe, promoting algae growth and the survival of non-native species.

Although the municipality of Pec pod Sněžkou was promised state subsidies for a wastewater treatment plant, it was unable to acquire ownership of the part of the building where the plant was supposed to be located. Additionally, mold infestation in the hut led to the removal of an exhibit from the collection of geologist, polar explorer, and mountaineer Josef Sekyra. By the end of 2002, concerns arose about the possible abandonment or closure of the hut.

In November 2002, Luční bouda was closed, leading to the loss of the only permanent winter ridge station for mountain rescue services. In 2003, CDH Leas, the then-owner of Luční bouda, declared bankruptcy. The bankruptcy administrator, Petr Tandler, set the minimum sale price at 5 million CZK. The Krkonoše National Park (KRNAP) administration expressed interest in purchasing the hut, but due to the high costs of necessary renovations, it was unable to meet even the minimum bid.

Eventually, the hut was purchased for 10.5 million CZK by the Prague-based company AEZZ, which renovated the building and reopened its main section on 19 June 2004. Plans were made to increase the number of beds from 50 to approximately 150–330, as indicated by the Czech Tourist Club maps.

The new owner organized club concerts and cultural events at the hut but was repeatedly fined for violating regulations regarding visitor transportation. In 2005, after a Mig 21 concert on 26 November 2005, attended by around 150 people, and a Borůvková Country Ball, damage to the fragile tundra and knee-high grasslands was discovered due to snowmobile tracks. As a result, the KRNAP administration imposed a fine of 250,000 CZK, which was later confirmed by the Ministry of the Environment upon appeal.

In March 2007, another fine was imposed for similar environmental violations. Around 500 concert attendees joined the Friends of Luční bouda Club, and a secret greeting among members is said to serve as a "ticket" to concerts. On 29 March 2008, the Jára Cimrman Theatre performed Conquest of the North Pole at the hut. Additionally, in March 2008, an online live-stream camera was installed at Luční bouda.

In May 2008, the Ministry of the Environment of the Czech Republic announced that it was considering purchasing Luční bouda from its private owner to convert it into an environmental education centre.

Since 2012, the hut has housed a microbrewery featuring a beer spa, producing the Paroháč beer brand. This makes it the highest-altitude brewery in Central Europe.

On 29 October 2017, during Cyclone Herwart, wind speeds of 182 km/h were recorded at Luční bouda.

As of 2020, the owner of the hut is Klára Sovová, who ran for the Senate in the 2018 by-elections.
