= Svoboda nad Úpou =

- Town
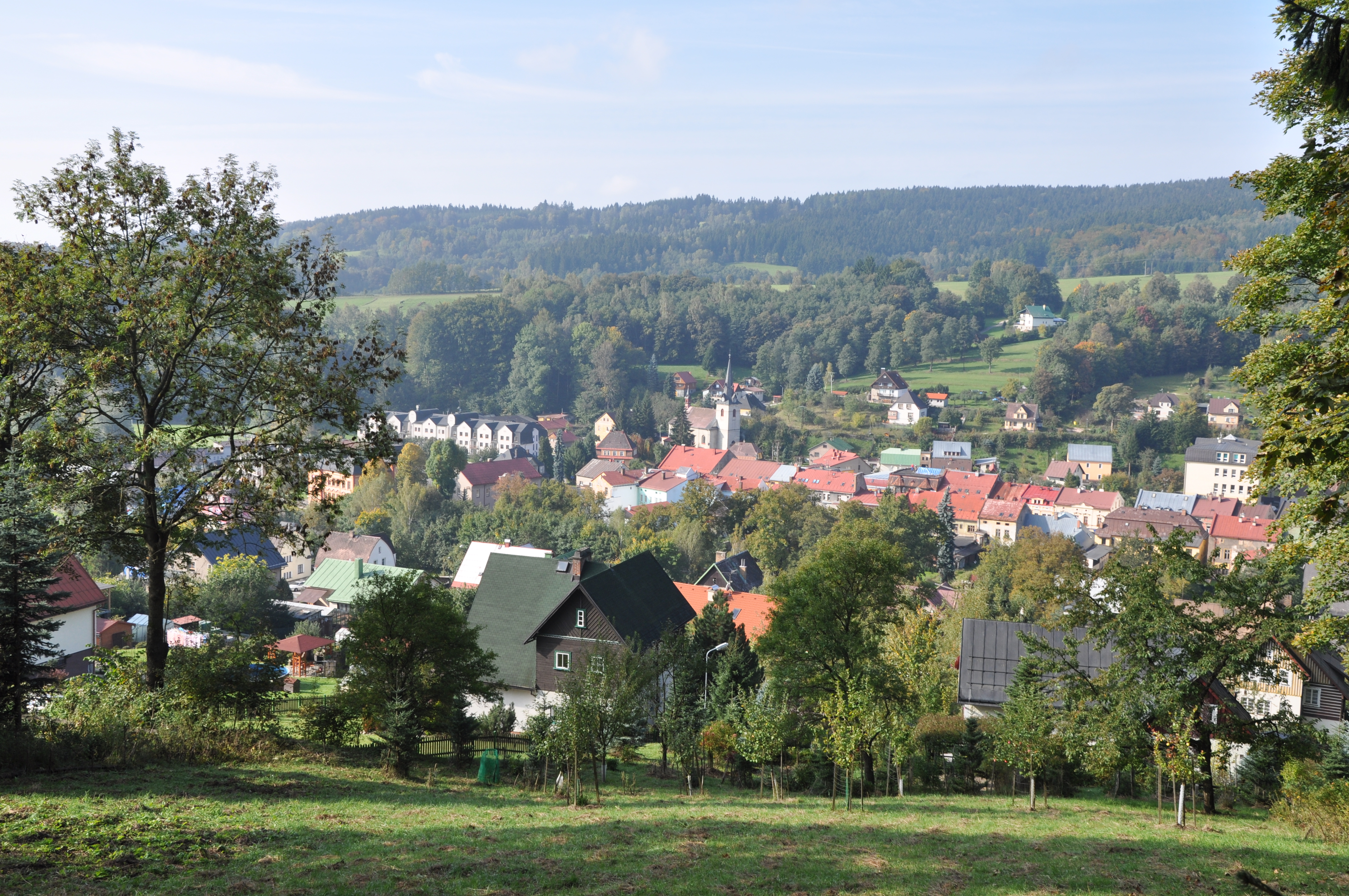
- Panorama of Svoboda nad Úpou

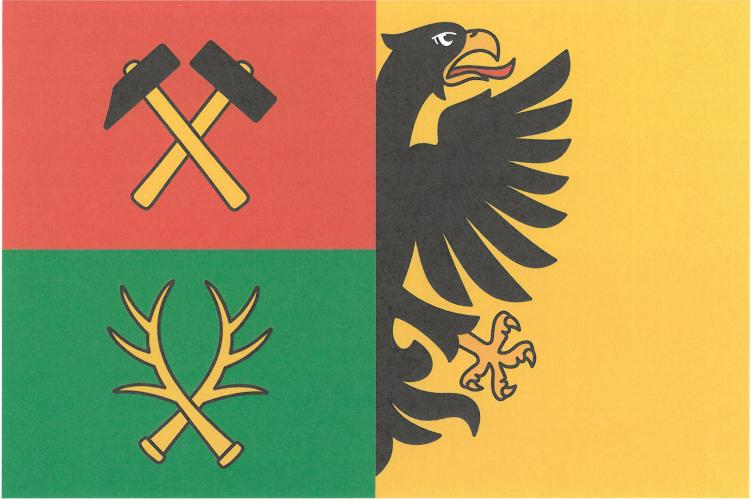
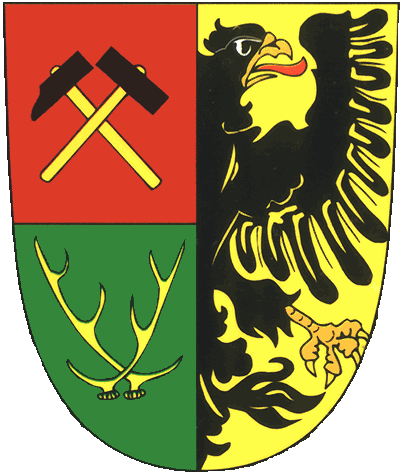
- Flag Coat of arms

- Location in the Czech Republic
- Coordinates: 50°38′0″N 15°48′51″E
- Country: Czech Republic
- Region: Hradec Králové
- District: Trutnov
- First mentioned: 1546

Government
  - Mayor: Petr Týfa

Area
  - Total: 7.75 km^{2} (2.99 sq mi)
- Elevation: 516 m (1,693 ft)

Population (2026-01-01)
  - Total: 1,923
  - Density: 248/km^{2} (643/sq mi)
- Time zone: UTC+1 (CET)
  - Summer (DST): UTC+2 (CEST)
- Postal code: 542 24
- Website: musvoboda.cz

Svoboda nad Úpou (Czech pronunciation: [ˈsvoboda ˈnat uːpou]; German: Freiheit an der Aupa) is a town in Trutnov District in the Hradec Králové Region of the Czech Republic. It has about 1,900 inhabitants. It lies in the Giant Mountains, in the valley of the Úpa River.

== Etymology ==
Both the Czech name Svoboda and the German name Freiheit literally means 'freedom'. The name refers to the "freedom to mine" (the privilege of a mining town).

== Geography ==
Svoboda nad Úpou is located about 8 kilometres (5 mi) northwest of Trutnov and 46 km (29 mi) north of Hradec Králové. It lies in the Giant Mountains. The highest point is at 1,000 m (3,281 ft) above sea level. The town is situated in the valley of the Úpa River.

== History ==
Based on the chronicle of Simon Hüttel, Svoboda nad Úpou was founded in 1009; the date is however unsubstantiated. The first written trustworthy mention of Svoboda nad Úpou is from 1546, when the settlement was granted the status of market town by Emperor Ferdinand I, receiving all the privileges of a mining town. In 1580, Svoboda nad Úpou was promoted to a town by Emperor Rudolf II.

Later the mining stopped in the area, but Svoboda nad Úpou became an important industrial town when paper mills were built in the 19th century. The railway was brought here in 1871. From 1938 to 1945, it was annexed by Nazi Germany and administered as part of the Reichsgau Sudetenland. The local German-speaking population was expelled after World War II.

== Demographics ==
Historical population

Year	Pop.	±%
1869	2,223	—
1880	3,321	+49.4%
1890	3,290	−0.9%
1900	3,424	+4.1%
1910	3,173	−7.3%

Year	Pop.	±%
1921	2,759	−13.0%
1930	2,816	+2.1%
1950	2,009	−28.7%
1961	2,366	+17.8%
1970	2,180	−7.9%

Year	Pop.	±%
1980	2,499	+14.6%
1991	2,436	−2.5%
2001	2,259	−7.3%
2011	2,119	−6.2%
2021	1,937	−8.6%

Source: Censuses

== Transport ==
Svoboda nad Úpou is the start of a short railway line to Trutnov, further continuing to Hradec Králové.

== Sights ==
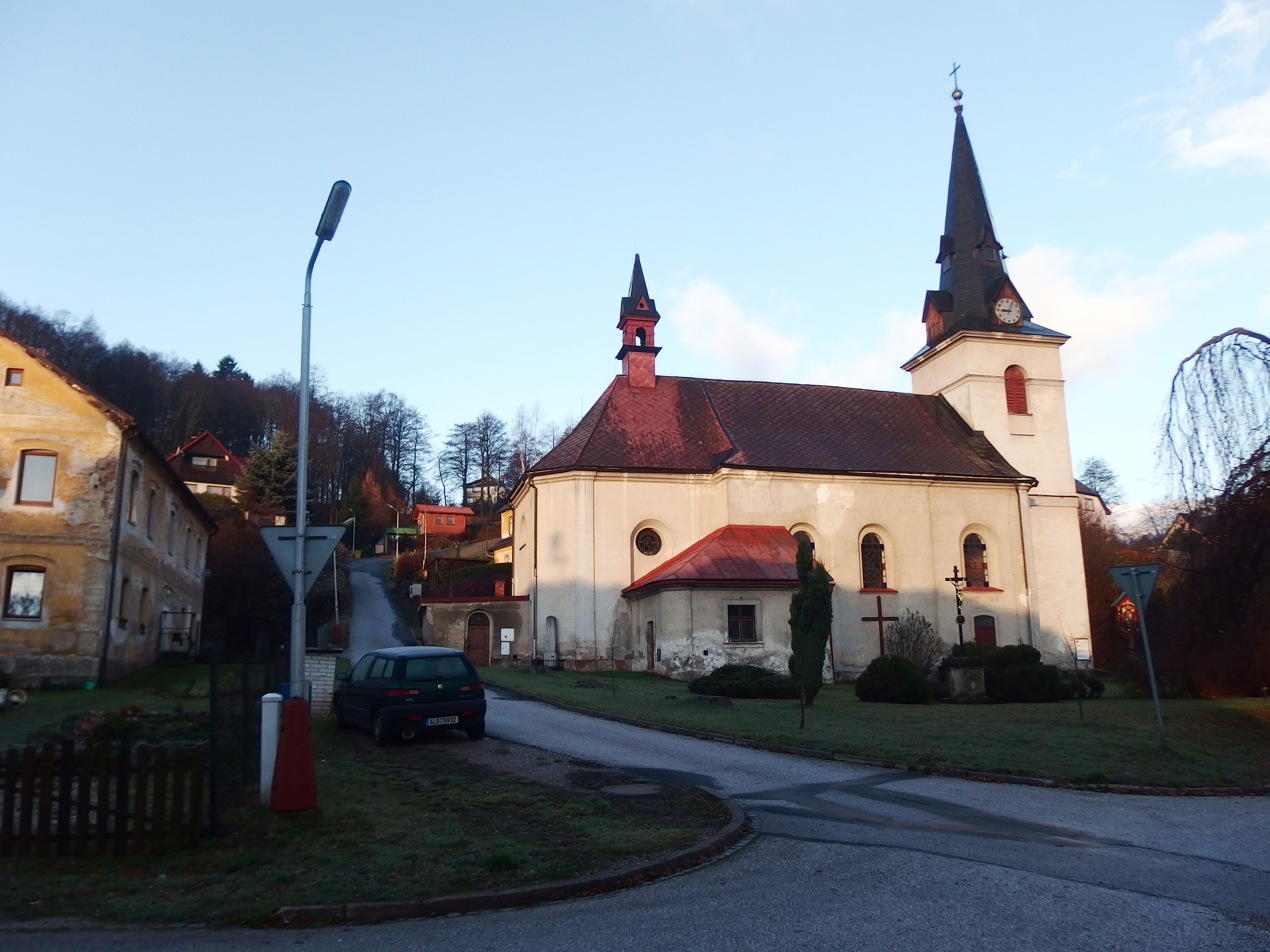
Church of Saint John of Nepomuk

The main landmark is the Church of Saint John of Nepomuk. The old Church of Saint Adalbert from 1584 was replaced by the new Church of Saint John of Nepomuk in 1777 at the behest of Prince Joseph I Adam of Schwarzenberg.

The Church of Saint Joseph in the local part of Dolní Maršov was built in 1927–1928.

== Notable people ==
- Franz Wende (1904–1968), ski jumper and Nordic combined skier
