= Bílé Labe =

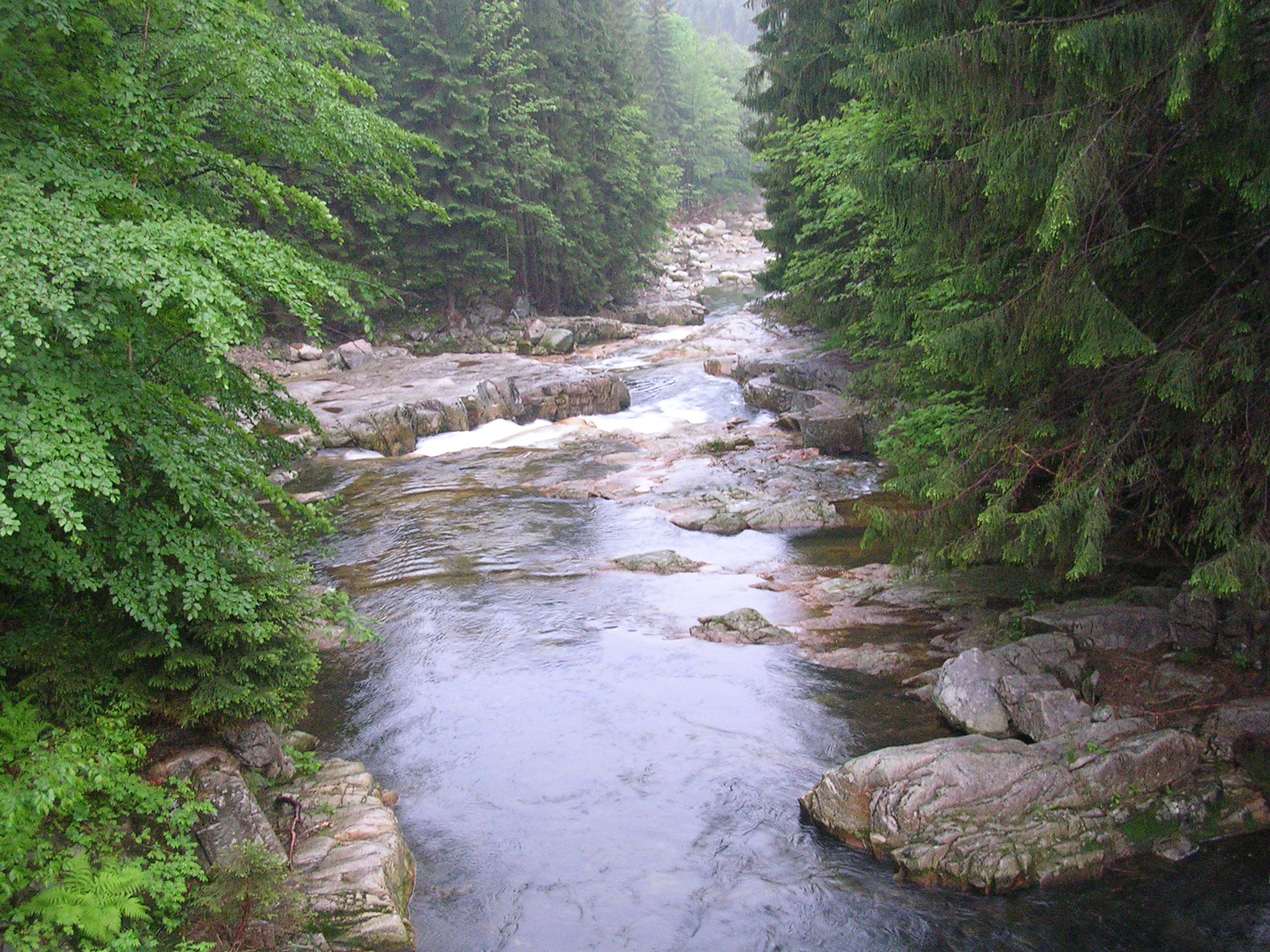
- The Bílé Labe near the mouth

Location
- Country: Czech Republic
- Region: Hradec Králové

Physical characteristics
- Source
  - location: Pec pod Sněžkou, Giant Mountains
  - coordinates: 50°44′4″N 15°42′22″E
  - elevation: 1,430 m (4,690 ft)
- Mouth
  - location: Elbe
  - coordinates: 50°44′27″N 15°36′22″E
  - elevation: 764 m (2,507 ft)
- Length: 8.3 km (5.2 mi)
- Basin size: 20.5 km^{2} (7.9 sq mi)
- Discharge
  - average: 0.77 m^{3}/s (27 cu ft/s) near estuary

Basin features
- Progression: Elbe→ North Sea

The Bílé Labe (German: Weißwasser) is a mountain river in the Czech Republic, a left tributary of the Elbe River. It flows in the Giant Mountains in the Hradec Králové Region and is 8.3 km (5.2 mi) long.

== Etymology ==
The name means 'white Elbe' in Czech. Names of rivers with this colour in the name often referred to the stony or pebbly nature of the river bed.

== Characteristic ==
The Bílé Labe originates in the territory of Pec pod Sněžkou in the Giant Mountains, in the Úpské rašelinistě bog at an elevation of 1,430 m (4,690 ft) and flows to Špindlerův Mlýn, where it enters the Elbe River at an elevation of 764 m (2,507 ft). It is 8.3 km (5.2 mi) long. Its drainage basin has an area of 20.5 km^{2} (7.9 sq mi). The average discharge at its mouth is 0.77 m^{3}/s (27 cu ft/s).

The longest tributaries of the Bílé Labe are:

Tributary	Length (km)	Side
Červený potok	3.2	right
Čertova strouha	2.8	right
Hřímavá bystřina	1.7	right
Stříbrná bystřina	1.4	right
Černý potok	1.0	right

== Course ==
The Bílé Labe does not flow through any settlements. Most of its length falls within the municipal territory of Špindlerův Mlýn, while its source is located in the territory of Pec pod Sněžkou. The entire flow of the river is located within the Krkonoše National Park.

== Tourism ==
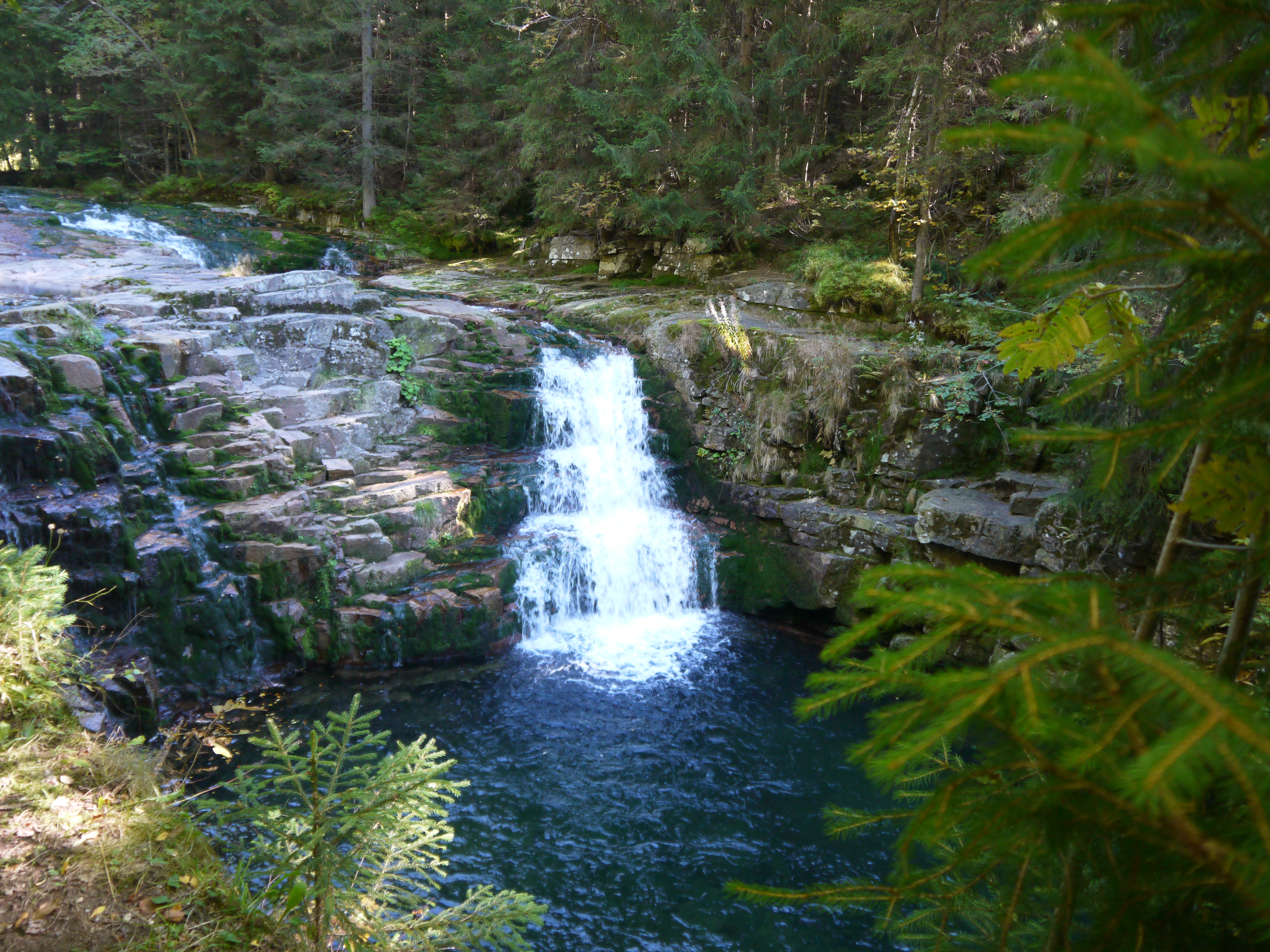
Dlouhý vodopád Waterfall

A tourist destination is the valley of the Bílé Labe. The Weber Trail runs through it along the river's course. The valley is of glacial origin and the river has a granite bedrock, into which it has cut.

The Bílé Labe is known for its high density of waterfalls and cascades. Their formation was caused by tectonic movements. There are ten waterfalls and cascades on the lower half of the river. The most popular of them is Velký vodopád with a height of 3.8 m (12 ft). Other named waterfalls are Dlouhý vodopád (14.5 m (48 ft) high), Plotnový vodopád (5.3 m (17 ft) high), Velký skok, Balvanový vodopád and Lavinová peřej.
