= Slatina nad Úpou =

- Municipality
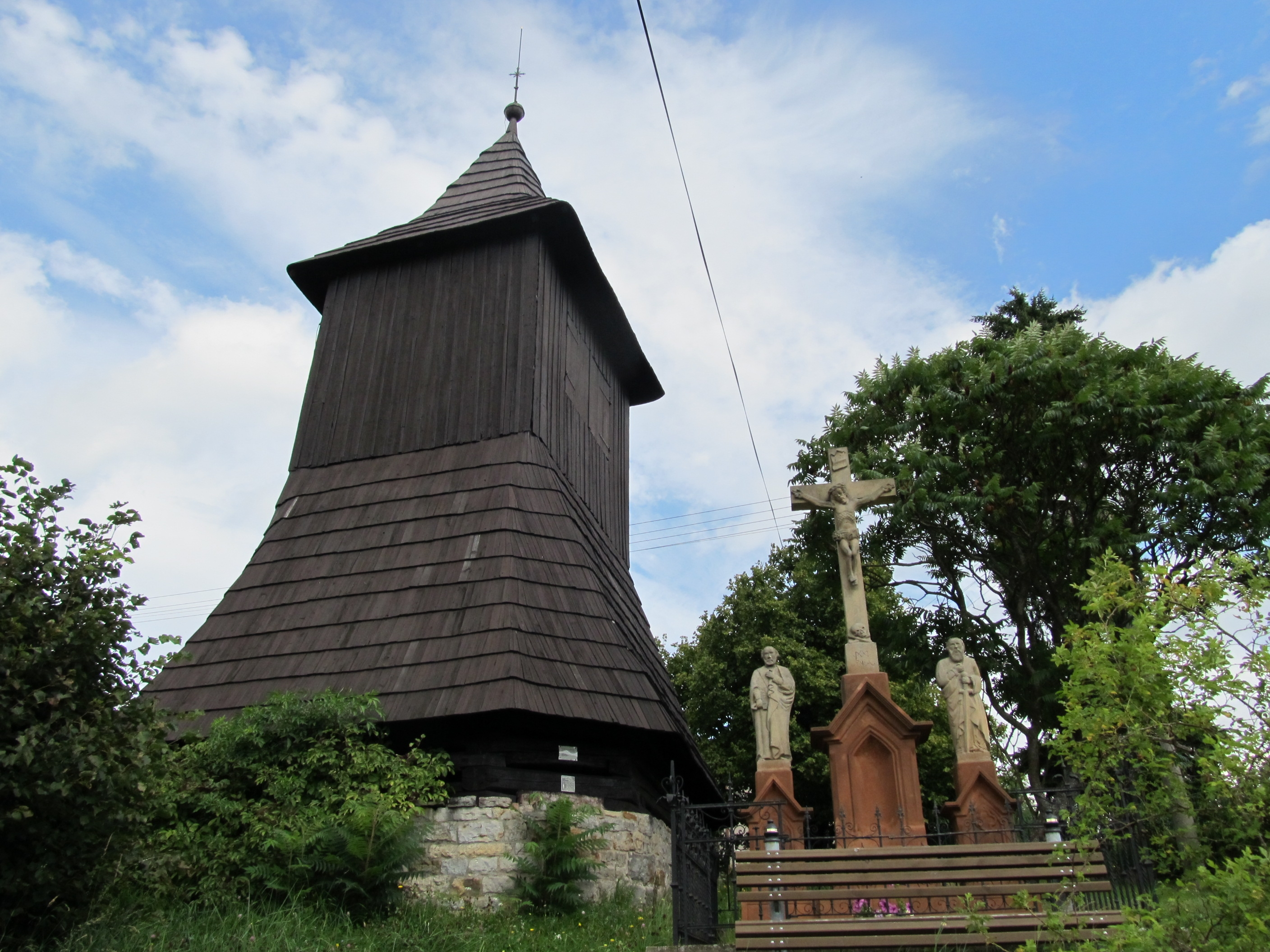
- Bell tower

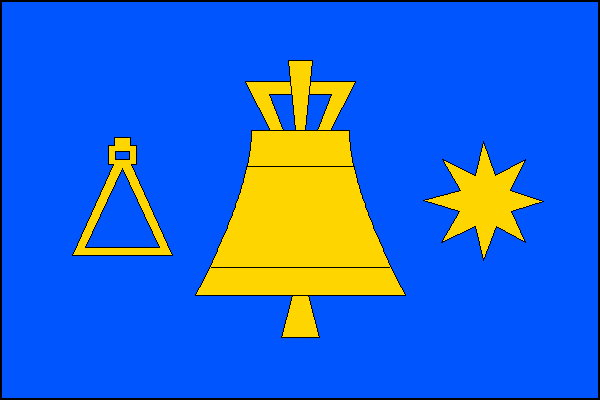
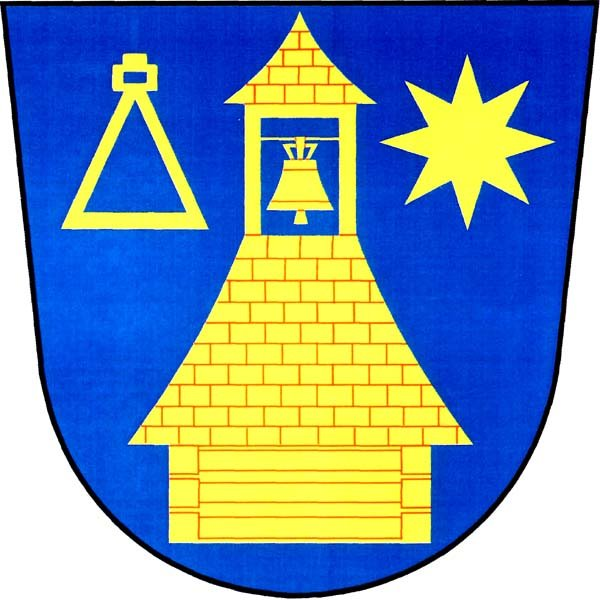
- Flag Coat of arms

- Location in the Czech Republic
- Coordinates: 50°27′15″N 16°2′12″E
- Country: Czech Republic
- Region: Hradec Králové
- District: Náchod
- First mentioned: 1545

Area
  - Total: 10.11 km^{2} (3.90 sq mi)
- Elevation: 372 m (1,220 ft)

Population (2026-01-01)
  - Total: 315
  - Density: 31.2/km^{2} (80.7/sq mi)
- Time zone: UTC+1 (CET)
  - Summer (DST): UTC+2 (CEST)
- Postal code: 549 47
- Website: www.slatinanadupou.cz

Slatina nad Úpou (German: Moorgrund an der Aupa) is a municipality and village in Náchod District in the Hradec Králové Region of the Czech Republic. It has about 300 inhabitants. It lies on the Úpa River.

== Demographics ==
Historical population
Year	Pop.	±%
1869	1,301	—
1880	1,311	+0.8%
1890	1,292	−1.4%
1900	1,148	−11.1%
1910	1,089	−5.1%
1921	973	−10.7%
1930	899	−7.6%
1950	617	−31.4%
1961	490	−20.6%
1970	419	−14.5%
1980	374	−10.7%
1991	320	−14.4%
2001	297	−7.2%
2011	291	−2.0%
2021	312	+7.2%
Source: Censuses
