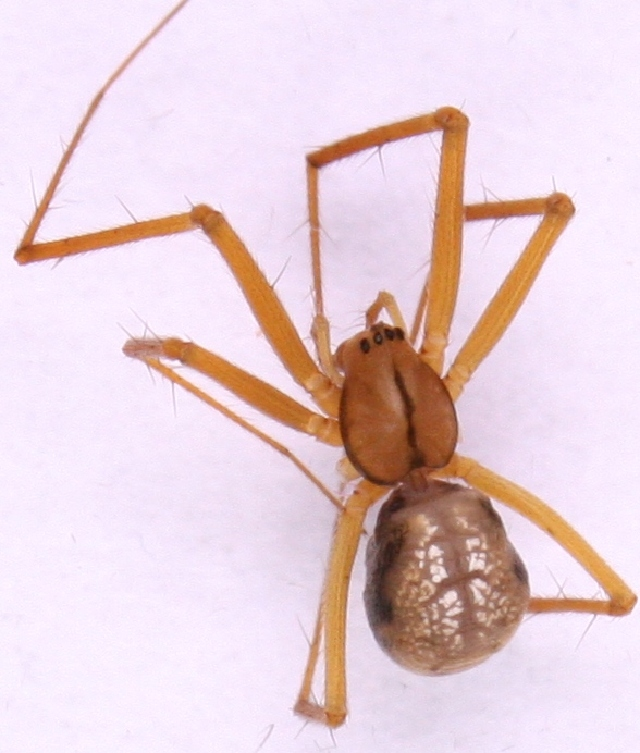
- B. alticeps

Scientific classification
- Kingdom: Animalia
- Phylum: Arthropoda
- Subphylum: Chelicerata
- Class: Arachnida
- Order: Araneae
- Infraorder: Araneomorphae
- Family: Linyphiidae
- Genus: Bolyphantes; C. L. Koch, 1837

Type species
- B. luteolus (Blackwall, 1833)

Species
- 17, see text

= Bolyphantes =

Genus of spiders

Bolyphantes is a genus of dwarf spiders that was first described by Carl Ludwig Koch in 1837.

== Species ==
As of May 2019 it contains seventeen species:

- Bolyphantes alticeps (Sundevall, 1833) – Europe, Caucasus, Russia (Europe to Far East), Central Asia, China, Japan
- Bolyphantes bipartitus (Tanasevitch, 1989) – Kazakhstan, Kyrgyzstan
- Bolyphantes distichoides Tanasevitch, 2000 – Russia (South Siberia)
- Bolyphantes distichus (Tanasevitch, 1986) – Russia (West to South Siberia), Kazakhstan
- Bolyphantes elburzensis Tanasevitch, 2009 – Iran
- Bolyphantes kilpisjaerviensis Palmgren, 1975 – Finland
- Bolyphantes kolosvaryi (Caporiacco, 1936) – France, Switzerland, Italy, Balkans
- Bolyphantes lagodekhensis (Tanasevitch, 1990) – Georgia
- Bolyphantes lamellaris Tanasevitch, 1990 – Italy, Greece, Russia (Caucasus)
- Bolyphantes luteolus (Blackwall, 1833) (type) – Europe, Russia (Europe to South Siberia), China
- Bolyphantes mongolicus Loksa, 1965 – Mongolia
- Bolyphantes nigropictus Simon, 1884 – Western Mediterranean
- Bolyphantes punctulatus (Holm, 1939) – Scandinavia, Russia (Urals, north-eastern Siberia to Far East)
- Bolyphantes sacer (Tanasevitch, 1986) – Kyrgyzstan
- Bolyphantes severtzovi Tanasevitch, 1989 – Central Asia
- Bolyphantes subtiliseta Tanasevitch, 2019 – France (Corsica)
- Bolyphantes supremus (Tanasevitch, 1986) – Kyrgyzstan
