= Červená Hora =

- Municipality
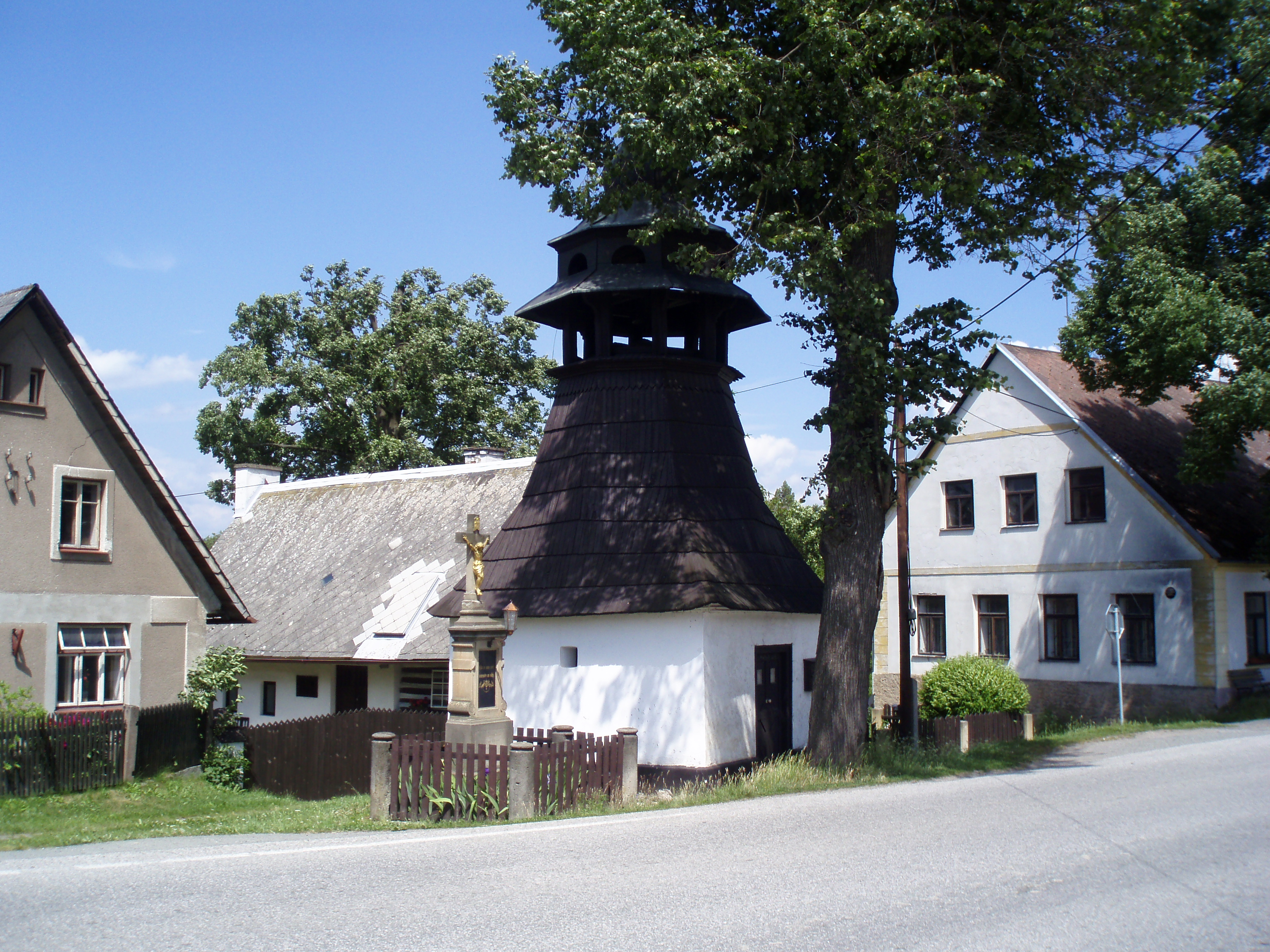
- Chapel of the Virgin Mary

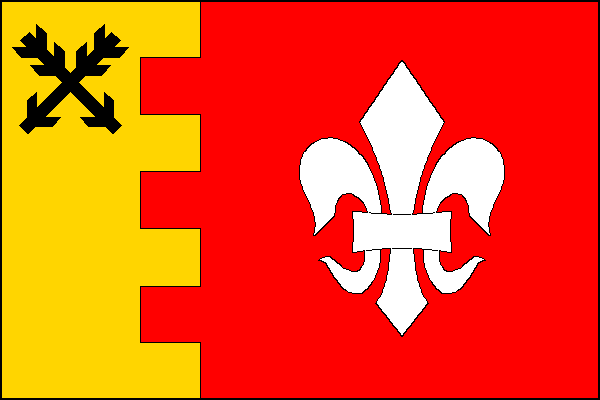
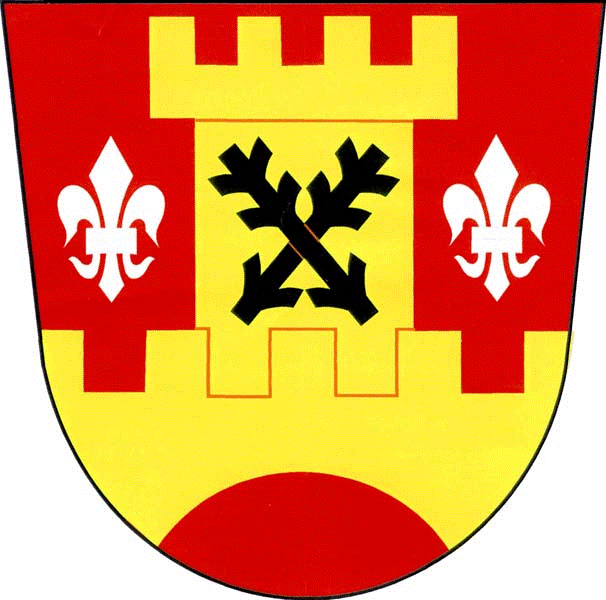
- Flag Coat of arms

- Location in the Czech Republic
- Coordinates: 50°27′0″N 16°3′32″E
- Country: Czech Republic
- Region: Hradec Králové
- District: Náchod
- First mentioned: 1291

Area
  - Total: 2.10 km^{2} (0.81 sq mi)
- Elevation: 377 m (1,237 ft)

Population (2026-01-01)
  - Total: 194
  - Density: 92.4/km^{2} (239/sq mi)
- Time zone: UTC+1 (CET)
  - Summer (DST): UTC+2 (CEST)
- Postal code: 549 41
- Website: www.cervenahora.cz

Červená Hora (German: Rothenburg) is a municipality and village in Náchod District in the Hradec Králové Region of the Czech Republic. It has about 200 inhabitants.

== Demographics ==
Historical population
| Year | Pop. | ±% |
|---|---|---|
| 1869 | 329 | — |
| 1880 | 323 | −1.8% |
| 1890 | 317 | −1.9% |
| 1900 | 282 | −11.0% |
| 1910 | 264 | −6.4% |
| 1921 | 229 | −13.3% |
| 1930 | 233 | +1.7% |
| 1950 | 205 | −12.0% |
| 1961 | 203 | −1.0% |
| 1970 | 195 | −3.9% |
| 1980 | 204 | +4.6% |
| 1991 | 186 | −8.8% |
| 2001 | 186 | +0.0% |
| 2011 | 184 | −1.1% |
| 2021 | 198 | +7.6% |
Source: Censuses
