= Havlovice =

- Municipality
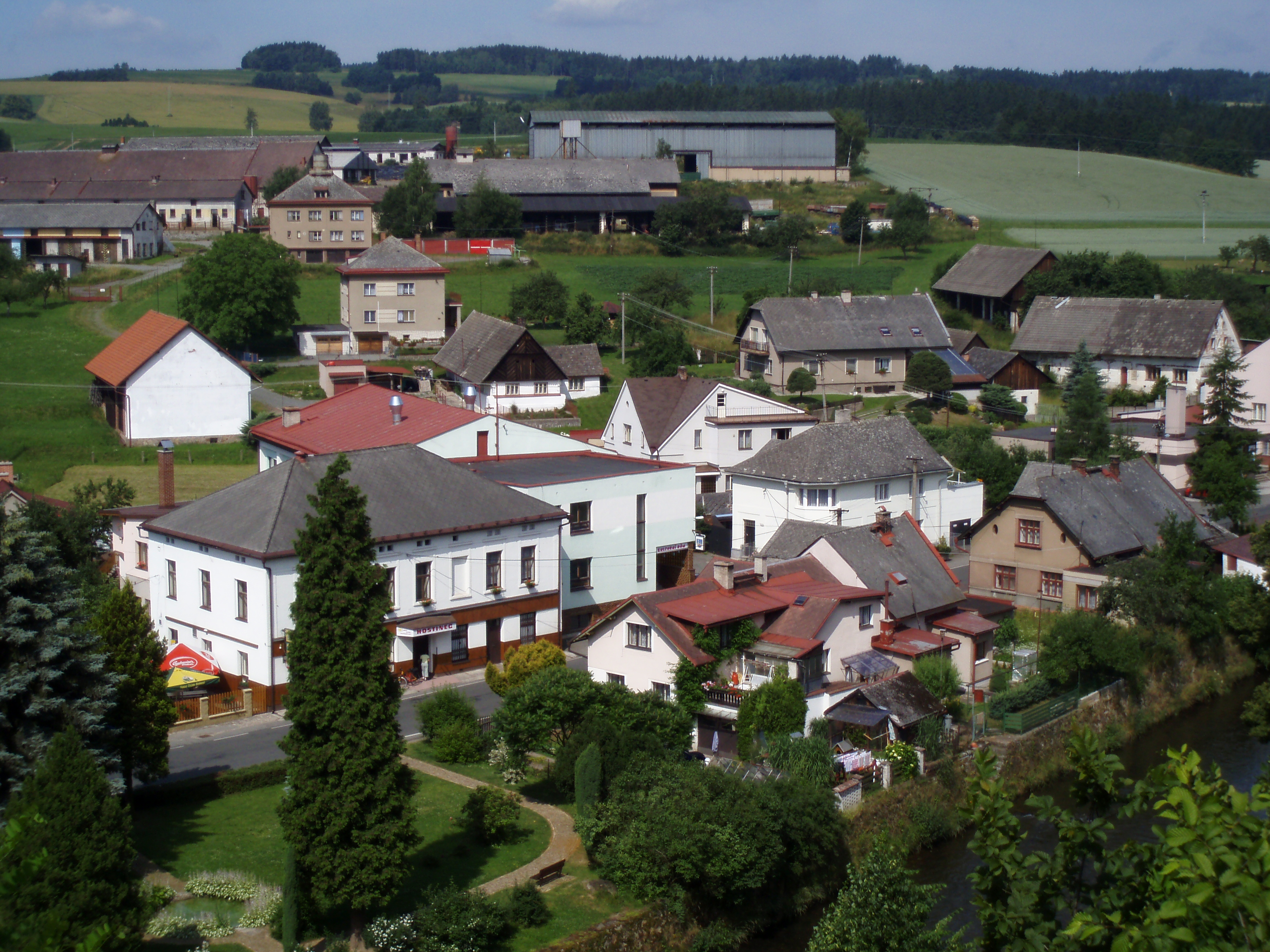
- Havlovice seen from the belfry

- Flag Coat of arms

- Location in the Czech Republic
- Coordinates: 50°29′15″N 16°1′46″E
- Country: Czech Republic
- Region: Hradec Králové
- District: Trutnov
- First mentioned: 1545

Area
  - Total: 8.70 km^{2} (3.36 sq mi)
- Elevation: 327 m (1,073 ft)

Population (2026-01-01)
  - Total: 1,009
  - Density: 116/km^{2} (300/sq mi)
- Time zone: UTC+1 (CET)
  - Summer (DST): UTC+2 (CEST)
- Postal code: 542 38
- Website: www.havlovice.cz

Havlovice is a municipality and village in Trutnov District in the Hradec Králové Region of the Czech Republic. It has about 1,000 inhabitants.

== Demographics ==
Historical population
Year	Pop.	±%
1869	941	—
1880	964	+2.4%
1890	1,037	+7.6%
1900	1,053	+1.5%
1910	1,130	+7.3%
1921	936	−17.2%
1930	1,055	+12.7%
1950	855	−19.0%
1961	861	+0.7%
1970	817	−5.1%
1980	784	−4.0%
1991	790	+0.8%
2001	857	+8.5%
2011	966	+12.7%
2021	934	−3.3%
Source: Censuses
