= Žernov (Náchod District) =

- Market town
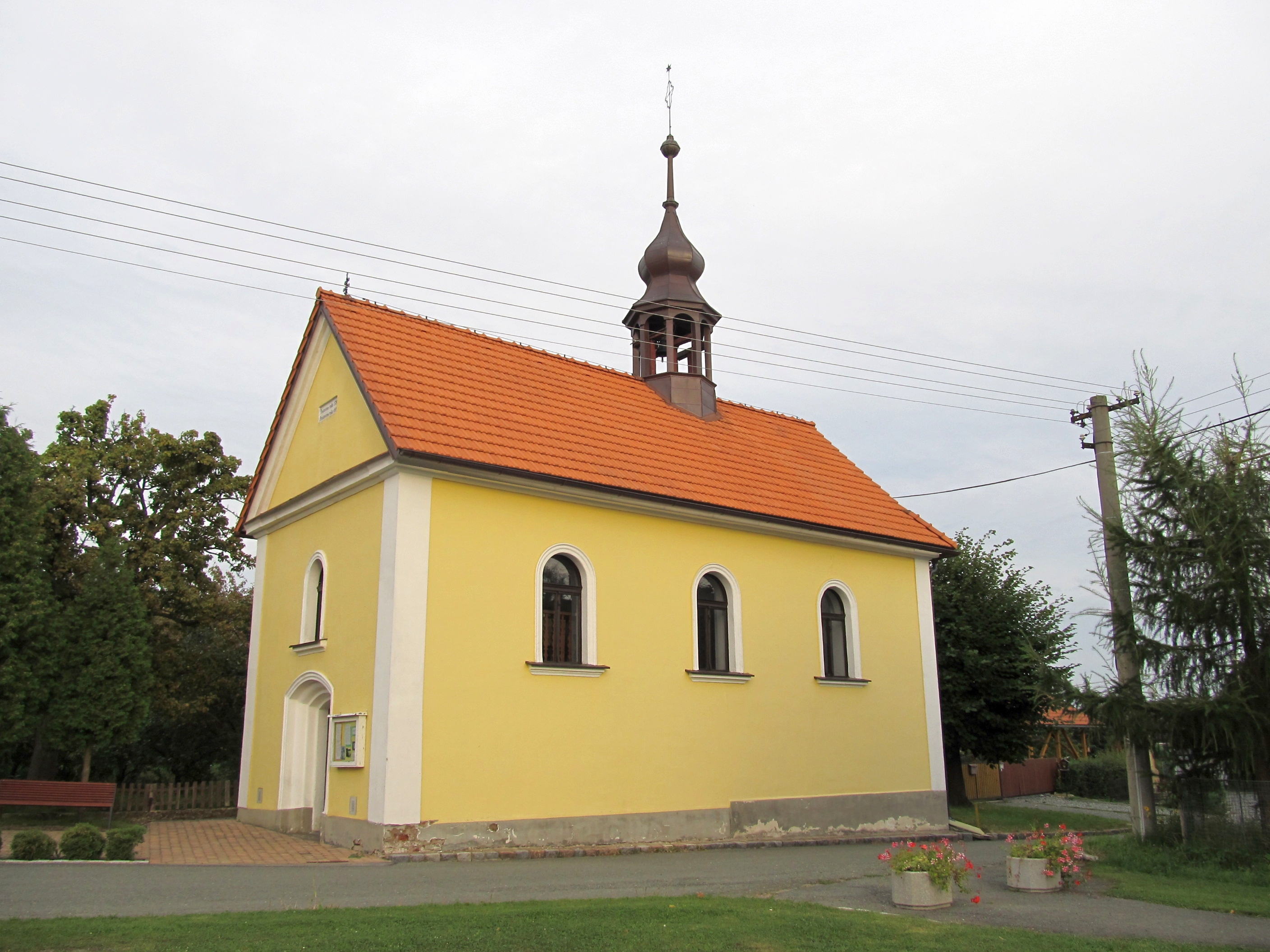
- Chapel of Our Lady of the Snows

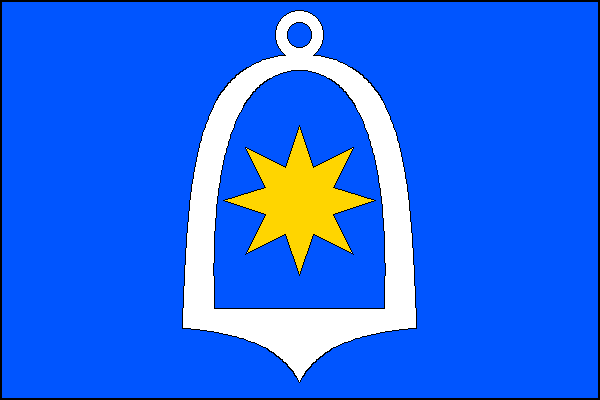
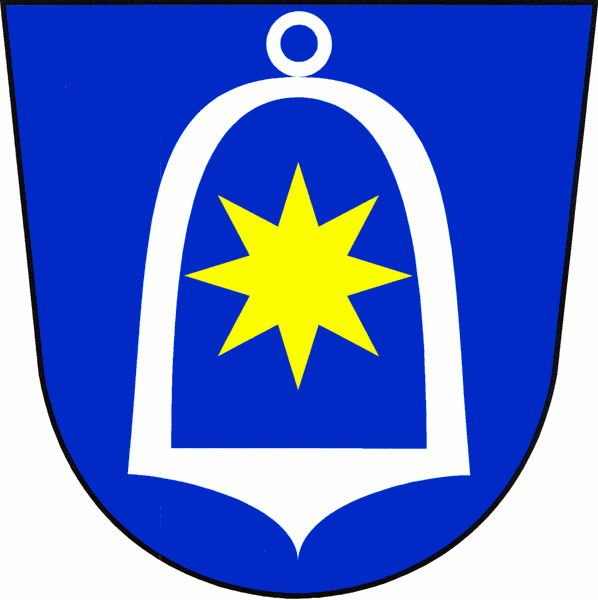
- Flag Coat of arms

- Location in the Czech Republic
- Coordinates: 50°25′50″N 16°3′27″E
- Country: Czech Republic
- Region: Hradec Králové
- District: Náchod
- First mentioned: 1417

Area
  - Total: 4.70 km^{2} (1.81 sq mi)
- Elevation: 378 m (1,240 ft)

Population (2026-01-01)
  - Total: 327
  - Density: 69.6/km^{2} (180/sq mi)
- Time zone: UTC+1 (CET)
  - Summer (DST): UTC+2 (CEST)
- Postal code: 552 03
- Website: zernov.cz

Žernov (Czech pronunciation: [ˈʒɛrnof]) is a market town in Náchod District in the Hradec Králové Region of the Czech Republic. It has about 300 inhabitants.

== Administrative division ==
Žernov consists of two municipal parts (in brackets population according to the 2021 census):

- Žernov (262)
- Rýzmburk (15)

== Etymology ==
The initial name of Žernov was Žrnovie. The name was derived from the Old Czech word žrn ('millstone').

== Geography ==
Žernov is located about 7 kilometres (4 mi) northwest of Náchod and 28 km (17 mi) northeast of Hradec Králové. It lies in the Giant Mountains Foothills. The market town is situated on a plateau above the Úpa River, which flows along the eastern municipal border. A small part of the Babiččino údolí National Nature Monument, which stretches along the river, is located in the municipal territory.

== History ==
The first written mention of Žernov is from 1417. In that time, it was already referred to as a market town. It belonged to the Rýzmburk estate, managed from the nearby castle. In the 16th century, the Rýzmburk estate was annexed to the Náchod estate.

== Demographics ==
Historical population

Year	Pop.	±%
1869	708	—
1880	655	−7.5%
1890	655	+0.0%
1900	587	−10.4%
1910	538	−8.3%

Year	Pop.	±%
1921	435	−19.1%
1930	399	−8.3%
1950	318	−20.3%
1961	269	−15.4%
1970	241	−10.4%

Year	Pop.	±%
1980	228	−5.4%
1991	216	−5.3%
2001	209	−3.2%
2011	251	+20.1%
2021	277	+10.4%

Source: Censuses

== Transport ==
There are no railways or major roads passing through the municipality.

== Sights ==
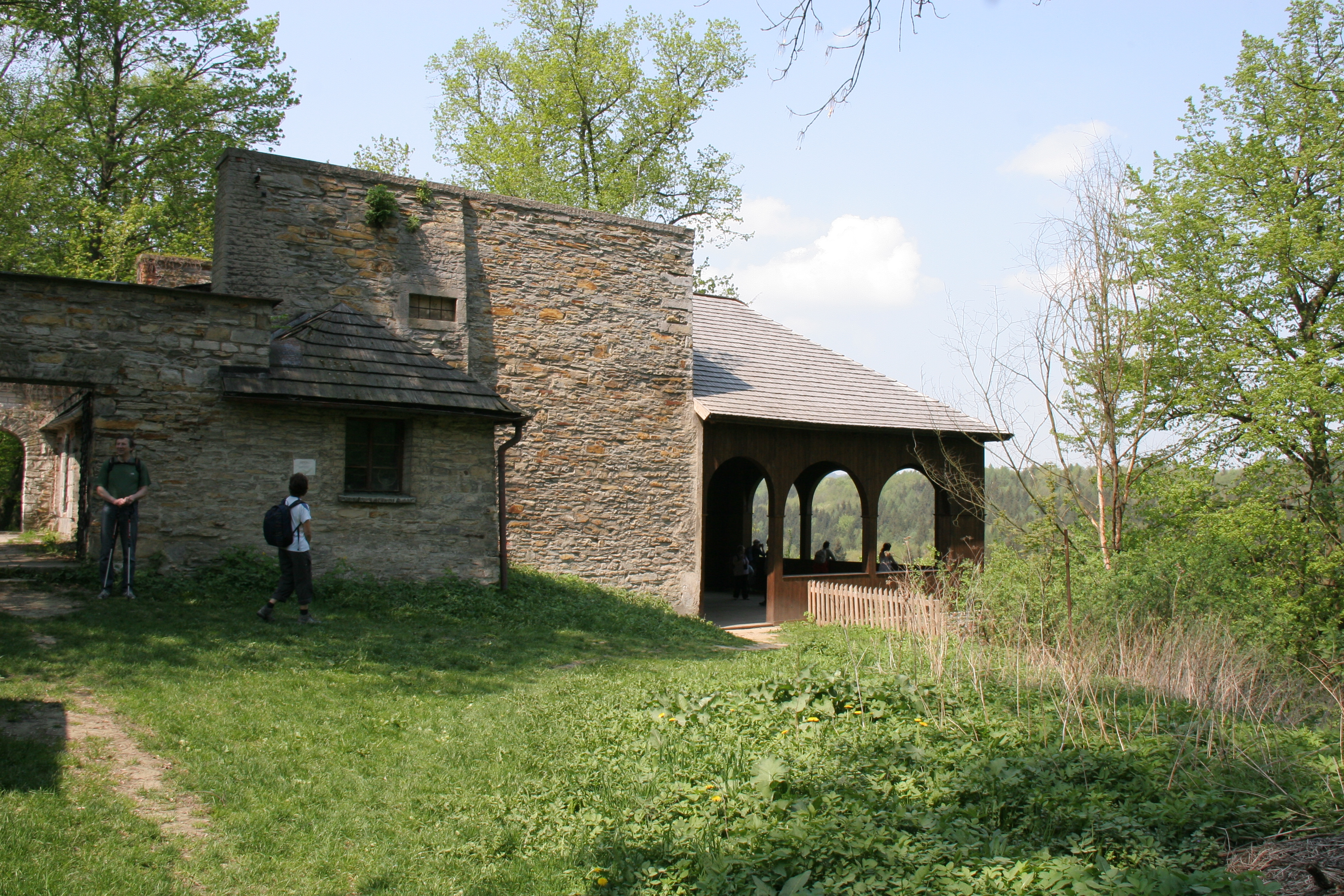
Ruin of the Rýzmburk Castle

The main landmark of the centre of Žernov is the Chapel of Our Lady of the Snows. It was built in 1790 and rebuilt into its present form in 1890.

A technical monument is the bridge Červený most ('red bridge'). It is a wooden suspension bridge, built in 1880.

The Rýzmburk Castle was built at the beginning of the 14th century. In the 16th century, it fell into disrepair and had to be repaired. In 1641 (during the Thirty Years' War), the castle was burned. From 1687, it was dismantled for building stone, which was used for the Ratibořice and Náchod castles. Today, the ruins of the castle consist of only two cellars and small remnants of walls.
