= Říkov =

- Municipality
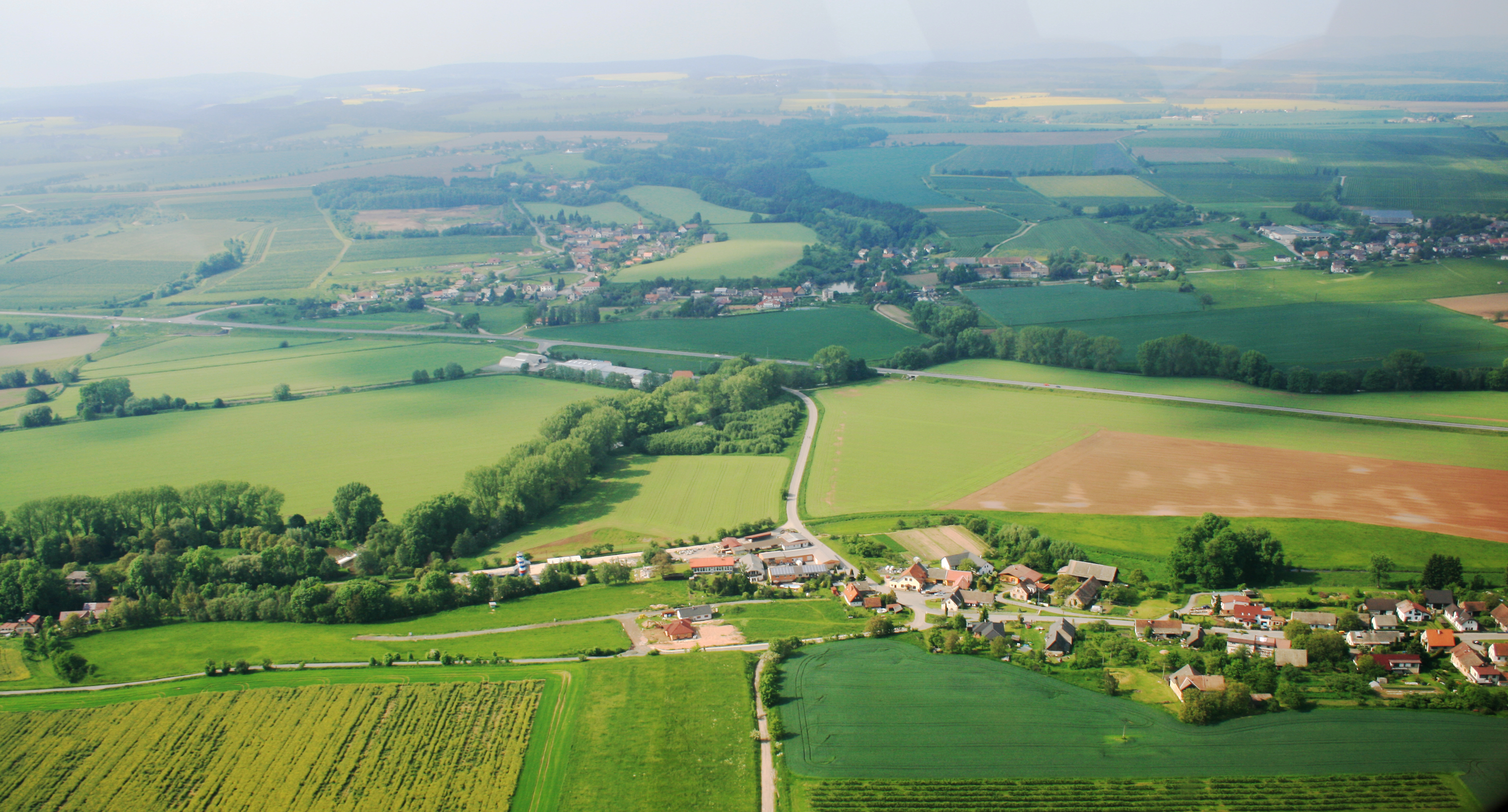
- Aerial view

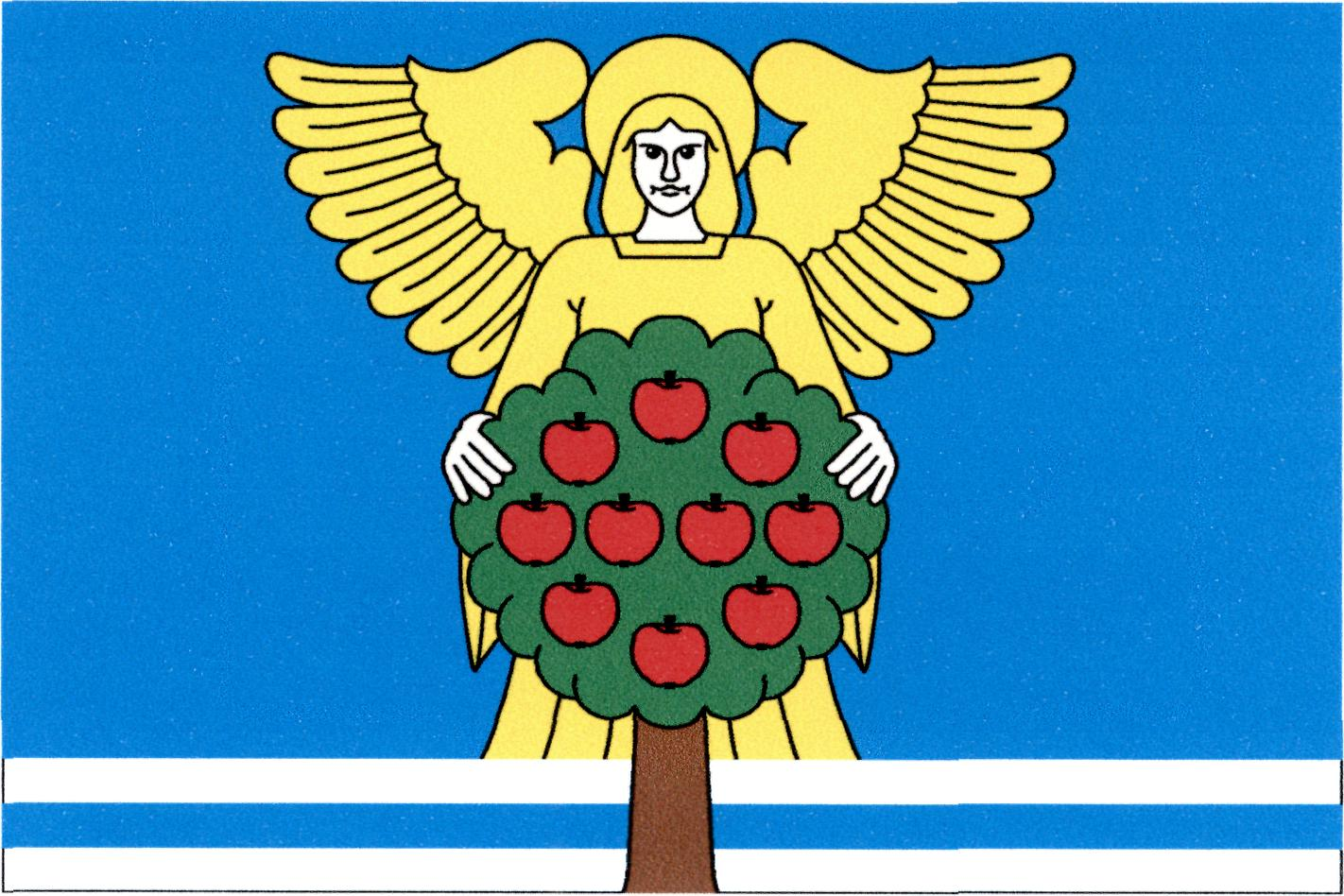
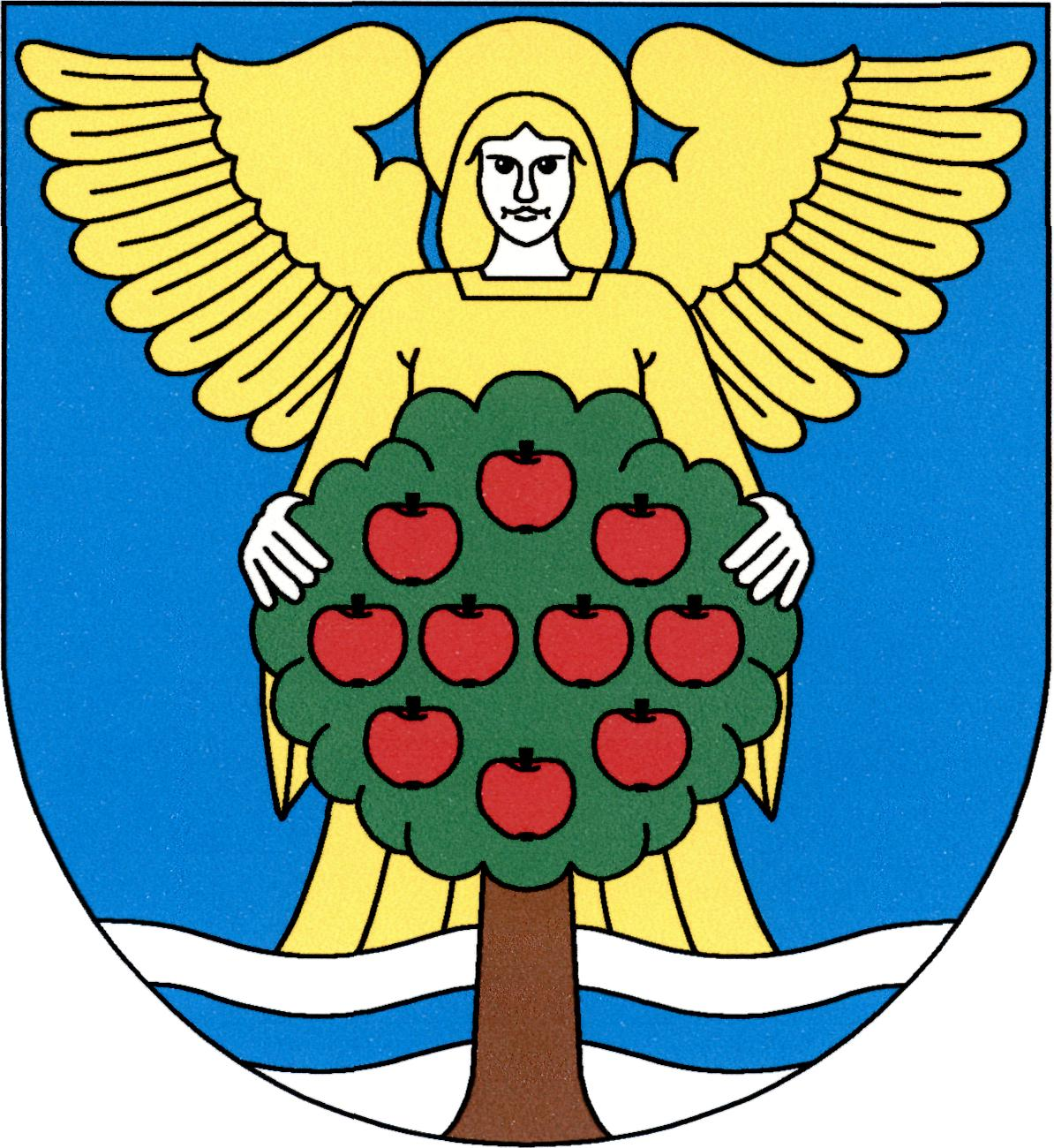
- Flag Coat of arms

- Location in the Czech Republic
- Coordinates: 50°23′4″N 16°1′0″E
- Country: Czech Republic
- Region: Hradec Králové
- District: Náchod
- First mentioned: 1366

Area
  - Total: 2.47 km^{2} (0.95 sq mi)
- Elevation: 274 m (899 ft)

Population (2026-01-01)
  - Total: 254
  - Density: 103/km^{2} (266/sq mi)
- Time zone: UTC+1 (CET)
  - Summer (DST): UTC+2 (CEST)
- Postal code: 552 03
- Website: www.obecrikov.cz

Říkov is a municipality and village in Náchod District in the Hradec Králové Region of the Czech Republic. It has about 300 inhabitants.

== History ==
The first written mention of Říkov is from 1366.

== Demographics ==
Historical population
Year	Pop.	±%
1869	351	—
1880	353	+0.6%
1890	330	−6.5%
1900	308	−6.7%
1910	302	−1.9%
1921	274	−9.3%
1930	264	−3.6%
1950	232	−12.1%
1961	216	−6.9%
1970	207	−4.2%
1980	171	−17.4%
1991	153	−10.5%
2001	173	+13.1%
2011	190	+9.8%
2021	224	+17.9%
Source: Censuses
