= Úpa =

River in the Czech Republic

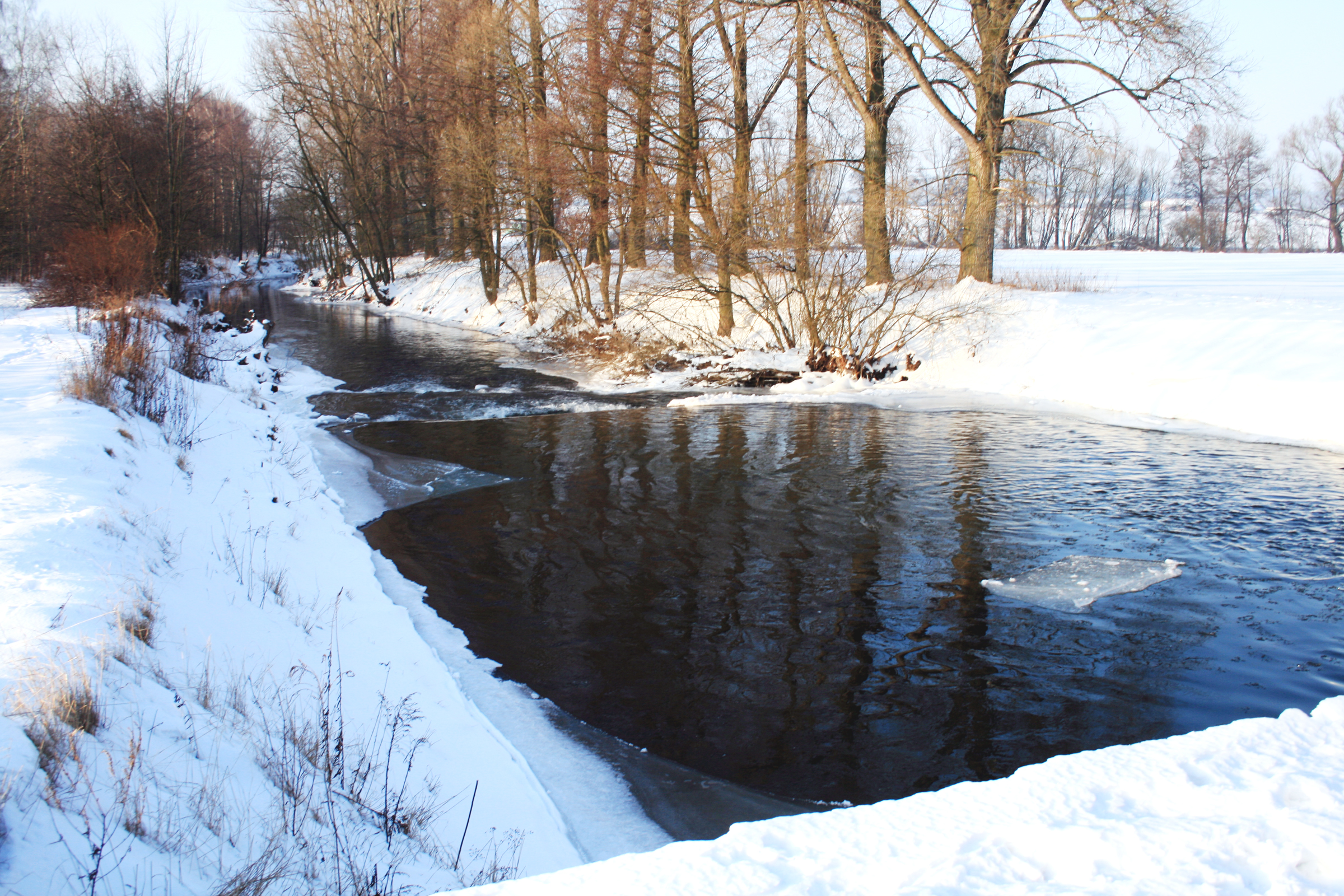
- The Úpa near Jaroměř

Location
- Country: Czech Republic
- Region: Hradec Králové

Physical characteristics
- Source
  - location: Pec pod Sněžkou, Giant Mountains
  - coordinates: 50°44′14″N 15°42′43″E
  - elevation: 1,424 m (4,672 ft)
- Mouth
  - location: Elbe
  - coordinates: 50°21′12″N 15°55′51″E
  - elevation: 250 m (820 ft)
- Length: 78.1 km (48.5 mi)
- Basin size: 513.1 km^{2} (198.1 sq mi)
- Discharge
  - average: 6.99 m^{3}/s (247 cu ft/s) near estuary

Basin features
- Progression: Elbe→ North Sea

The Úpa (Czech pronunciation: [ˈuːpa]; German: Aupa) is a river in the Czech Republic, a left tributary of the Elbe River. It flows through the Hradec Králové Region. It is 78.1 km (48.5 mi) long.

== Etymology ==
The name is of the Illyrian or Celtic origin, from the word that meant 'river'.

== Characteristic ==
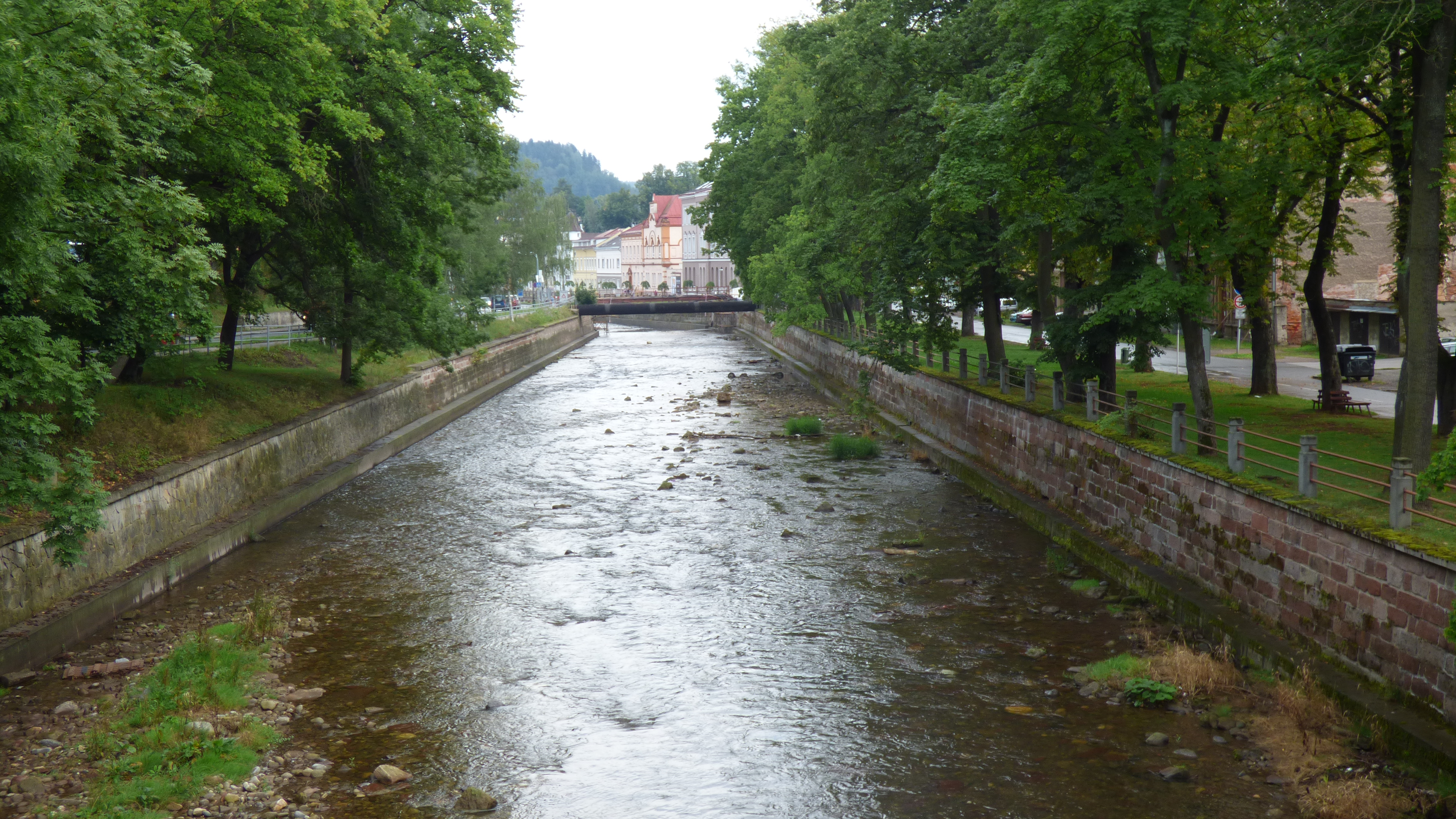
The Úpa in Trutnov

The Úpa originates in the territory of Pec pod Sněžkou in the Giant Mountains at an elevation of 1,424 m (4,672 ft), on the slope of the Studniční hora mountain. It has the highest source of all Czech rivers. flows to Jaroměř, where it enters the Elbe River at an elevation of 250 m (820 ft). It is 78.1 km (48.5 mi) long. Its drainage basin has an area of 513.1 km^{2} (198.1 sq mi), of which 490.3 km^{2} (189.3 sq mi) in the Czech Republic and rest in Poland.

The upper course is characterised by a large drop and a rocky river bed. Its tributaries are mainly small mountain streams. The longest tributaries of the Úpa are:

Tributary	Length (km)	River km	Side
Olešnice	18.6	14.8	left
Ličná	17.3	44.5	left
Válovický potok	11.4	9.3	right
Malá Úpa	11.3	67.5	left
Rtyňka	9.1	32.0	left

== Course ==
The most notable settlement on the river is the town of Trutnov. The river flows through the municipal territories of Pec pod Sněžkou, Horní Maršov, Svoboda nad Úpou, Mladé Buky, Trutnov, Suchovršice, Úpice, Havlovice, Slatina nad Úpou, Červená Hora, Žernov, Česká Skalice, Říkov, Rychnovek and Jaroměř.

== Bodies of water ==
There are 266 bodies of water in the basin area. The largest of them is the fishpond Špinka with an area of 35 ha (86 acres). A canal from the Úpa also supplies the Rozkoš Reservoir, but it does not belong into the river's basin area.

== Protection of nature ==
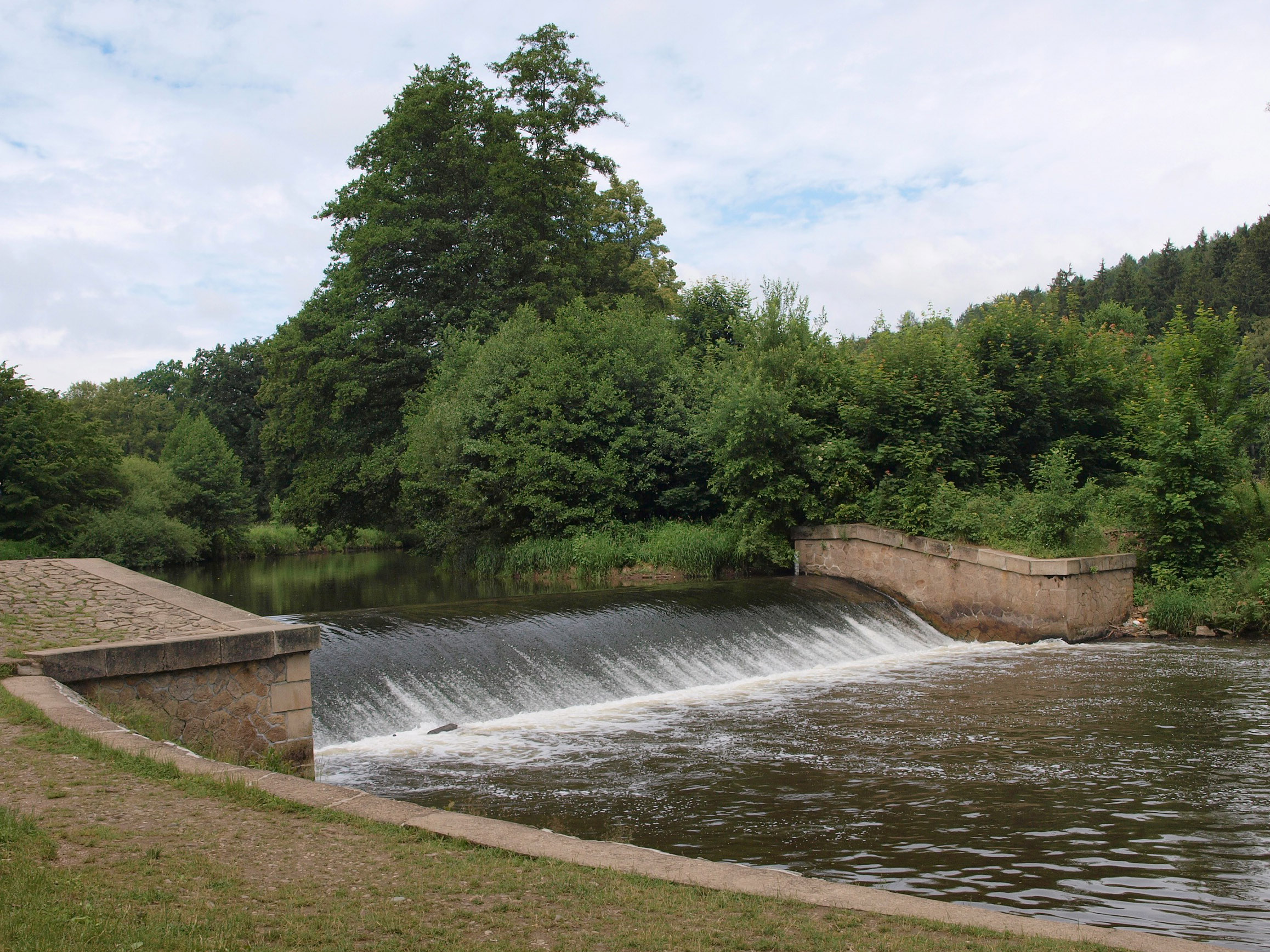
Viktorčin splav, one of the best-known places in Grandmother's Valley popularized by The Grandmother book

The section of the river between Červená Hora and Česká Skalice and the immediate surroundings is known as the Babiččino údolí ("Grandmother's Valley"). It is protected as a national nature monument with an area is 331.0 ha (818 acres). Protected species of birds such as the common kingfisher, grey wagtail, white-throated dipper, river warbler and common merganser are tied to the Úpa. Other notable representatives of the fauna in the protected area are the European crayfish, European bullhead, Eurasian otter and green snaketail.

== Sport ==
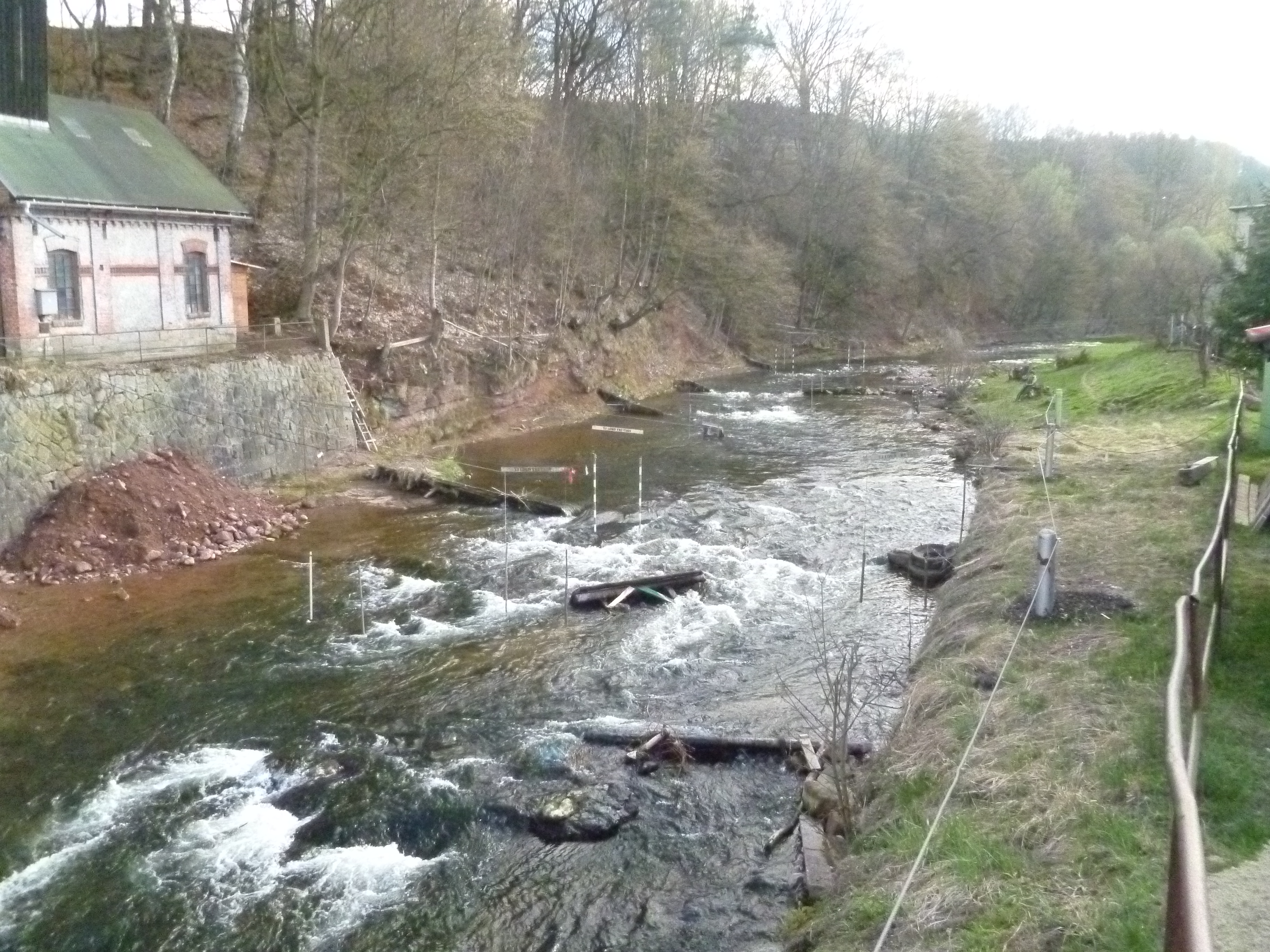
Slalom course in Trutnov

There is a slalom course on the river in Trutnov. The Trutnovské slalomy competition is held here every year since 1965.

== Tourism ==
The Úpa is suitable for river tourism, but in the summer there is usually a lack of water in the river. The upper course is only suitable for experienced paddlers. The most popular section is therefore the section from Trutnov-Bohuslavice to Česká Skalice.

Grandmother's Valley is connected with life and work of Božena Němcová, who belongs among the most impactful Czech writers. It is one of the most popular tourist destinations in the region. The area of the Ratibořice Castle and valley is protected as a national cultural monument.

== See also ==
- List of rivers of the Czech Republic
