= Pec pod Sněžkou =

- Town
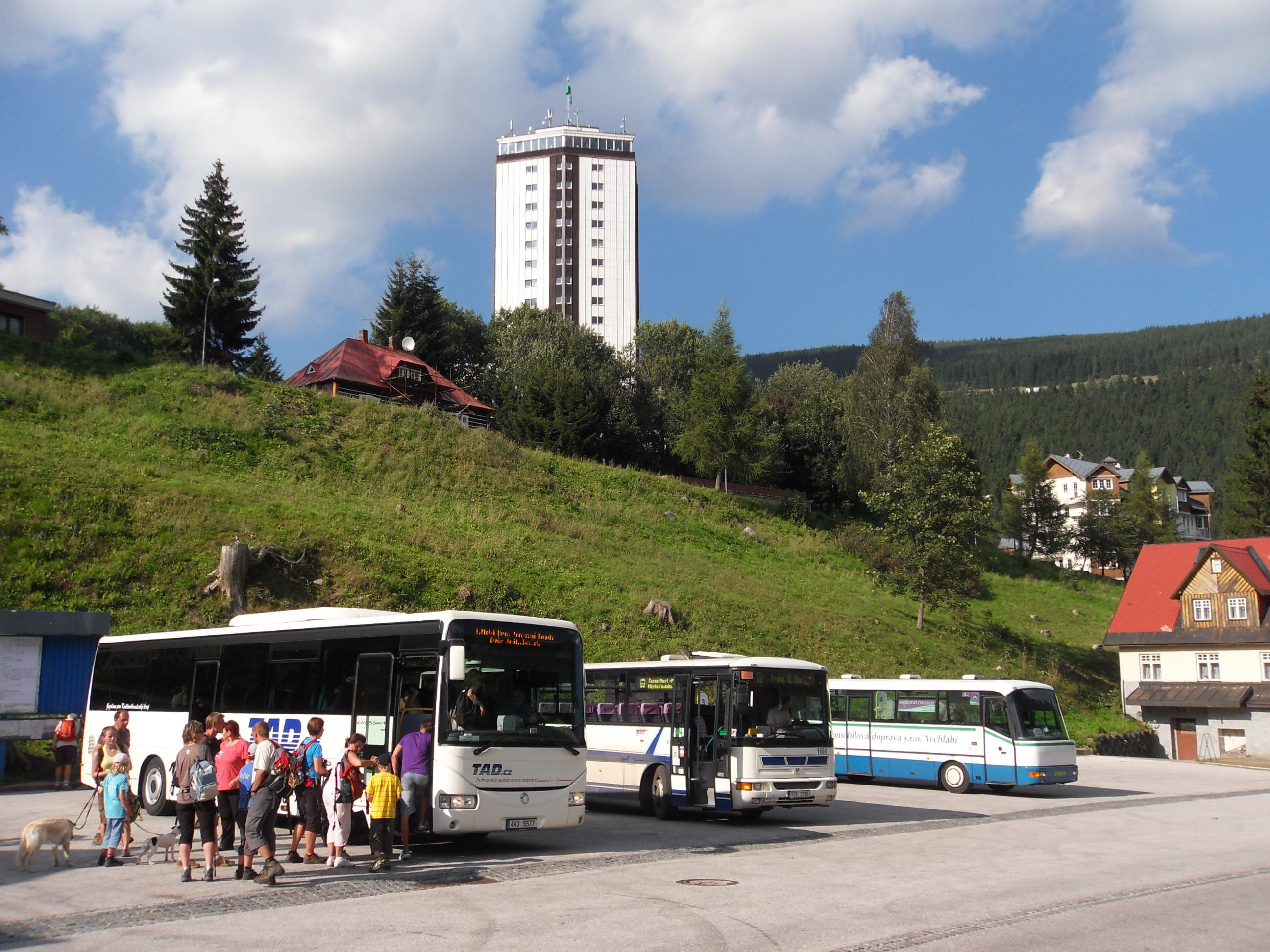
- Bus station

- Flag Coat of arms

- Location in the Czech Republic
- Coordinates: 50°41′37″N 15°44′0″E
- Country: Czech Republic
- Region: Hradec Králové
- District: Trutnov
- First mentioned: 1511

Government
  - Mayor: Ilona Karlíková

Area
  - Total: 52.10 km^{2} (20.12 sq mi)
- Elevation: 769 m (2,523 ft)

Population (2026-01-01)
  - Total: 696
  - Density: 13.4/km^{2} (34.6/sq mi)
- Time zone: UTC+1 (CET)
  - Summer (DST): UTC+2 (CEST)
- Postal code: 542 21
- Website: www.pecpodsnezkou.cz

Pec pod Sněžkou (Czech pronunciation: [ˈpɛts ˈpot sɲɛʃkou]; German: Petzer) is a town in Trutnov District in the Hradec Králové Region of the Czech Republic. It has about 700 inhabitants. The town is located on the Úpa River in the Giant Mountains, at the base of the highest mountain of the Czech Republic, Sněžka.

The ski resort at Pec pod Sněžkou is one of the best-known mountain resorts in the country. A cable car system leads from the town to the top of Sněžka.

== Administrative division ==
Pec pod Sněžkou consists of two municipal parts (in brackets population according to the 2021 census):

- Pec pod Sněžkou (366)
- Velká Úpa (294)

== Etymology ==
The name means 'furnace below Sněžka' in Czech.

== Geography ==
Pec pod Sněžkou is located about 18 km (11 mi) northwest of Trutnov and 54 km (34 mi) north of Hradec Králové. It lies in the Giant Mountains and, with the exception of the built-up area, in the Krkonoše National Park. The highest points are Sněžka, at 1,603 m (5,259 ft) above sea level the highest mountain of the whole country, and Studniční hora, the third highest mountain of the country at 1,555 m (5,102 ft).

The Úpa River originates here and flows across the municipality. The stream Zelený potok flows into the Úpa in the centre of Pec pod Sněžkou. The built-up area is located in the valley of these two watercourses. The large valley of the Úpa River in the northern part of the municipal territory, located between Sněžka and Studniční hora, is known as Obří důl.

On the southern slope of Studniční hora is a snow field called Map of the Republic. The shape of the field resembles the shape of the territory of the First Czechoslovak Republic. Terrain modeling and wind currents make this the last place in the country where snow melts. The snow here often lasted until August or September, but in the 21st century, due to climate changes, the snow most often lasts until the beginning of July.

== History ==
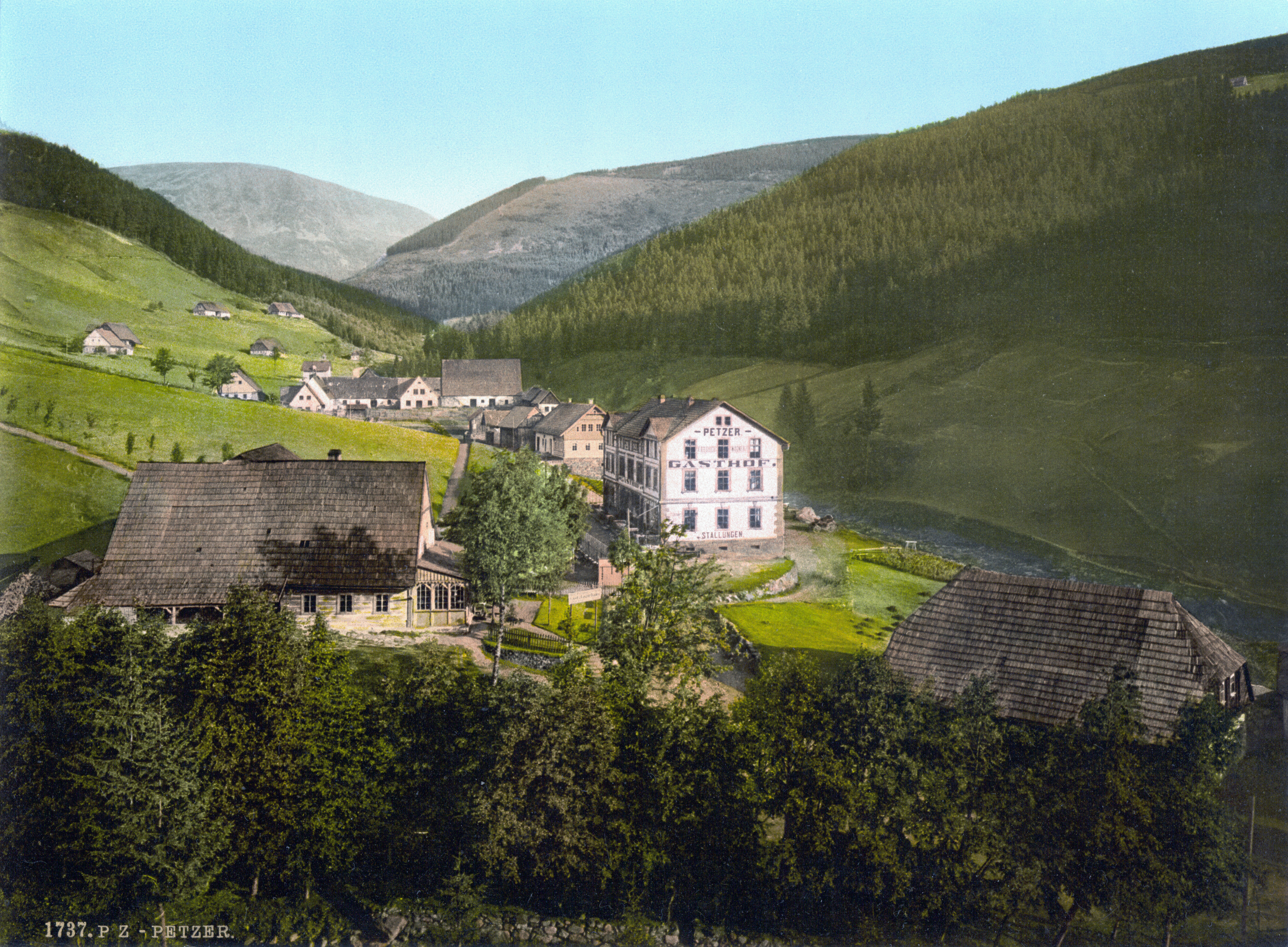
Pec pod Sněžkou around 1900

The oldest documented settlement in the area is the mining village called Obří důl (lit. 'giant mine'), where the first recorded mining occurred in 1511. Mainly copper ore and arsenopyrite were mined until 1959, when the mines were closed after nearly 450 years.

The village of Pec pod Sněžkou was founded in the 16th century, when it was one of three parts of Velká Úpa. This was the result of extensive logging and felling of forests in the area. The area was colonised by lumberjacks from Styria, Carinthia and Tyrol, who built huts, founded meadows in forest clearings, and bred cattle and goats.

== Demographics ==
Historical population

Year	Pop.	±%
1869	2,621	—
1880	2,648	+1.0%
1890	2,508	−5.3%
1900	2,314	−7.7%
1910	2,171	−6.2%

Year	Pop.	±%
1921	1,980	−8.8%
1930	2,198	+11.0%
1950	3,876	+76.3%
1961	793	−79.5%
1970	616	−22.3%

Year	Pop.	±%
1980	617	+0.2%
1991	529	−14.3%
2001	595	+12.5%
2011	780	+31.1%
2021	660	−15.4%

Source: Censuses

== Transport ==
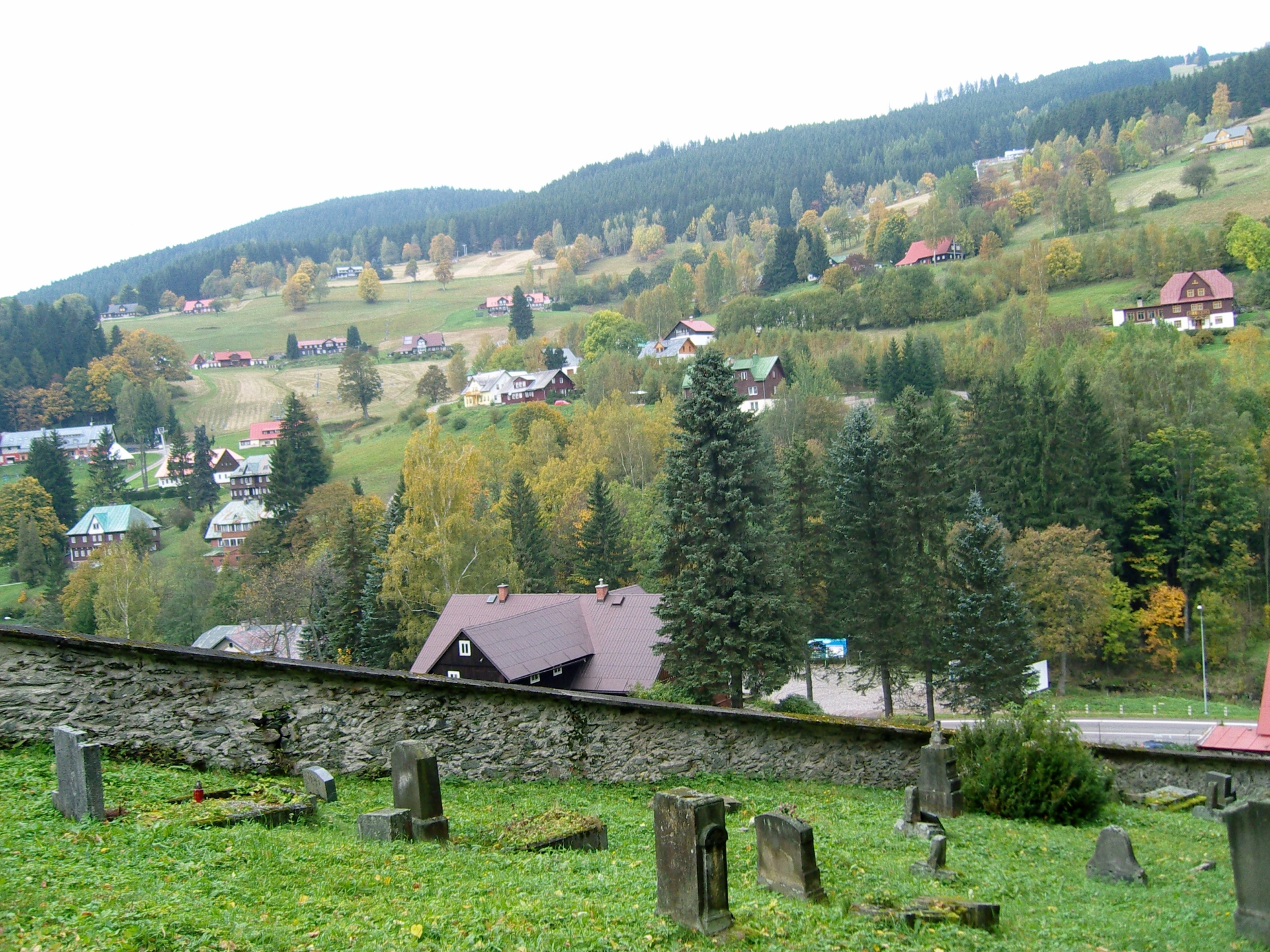
The village of Velká Úpa

There are no railways or major roads passing through the municipality. Pec pod Sněžkou has direct bus connection with Prague.

An old chairlift from 1949 to the top of Sněžka was replaced by a new cable car system in February 2014. The system consists of two sections and can carry up to 250 visitors per hour in four-person cabins.

== Sport ==
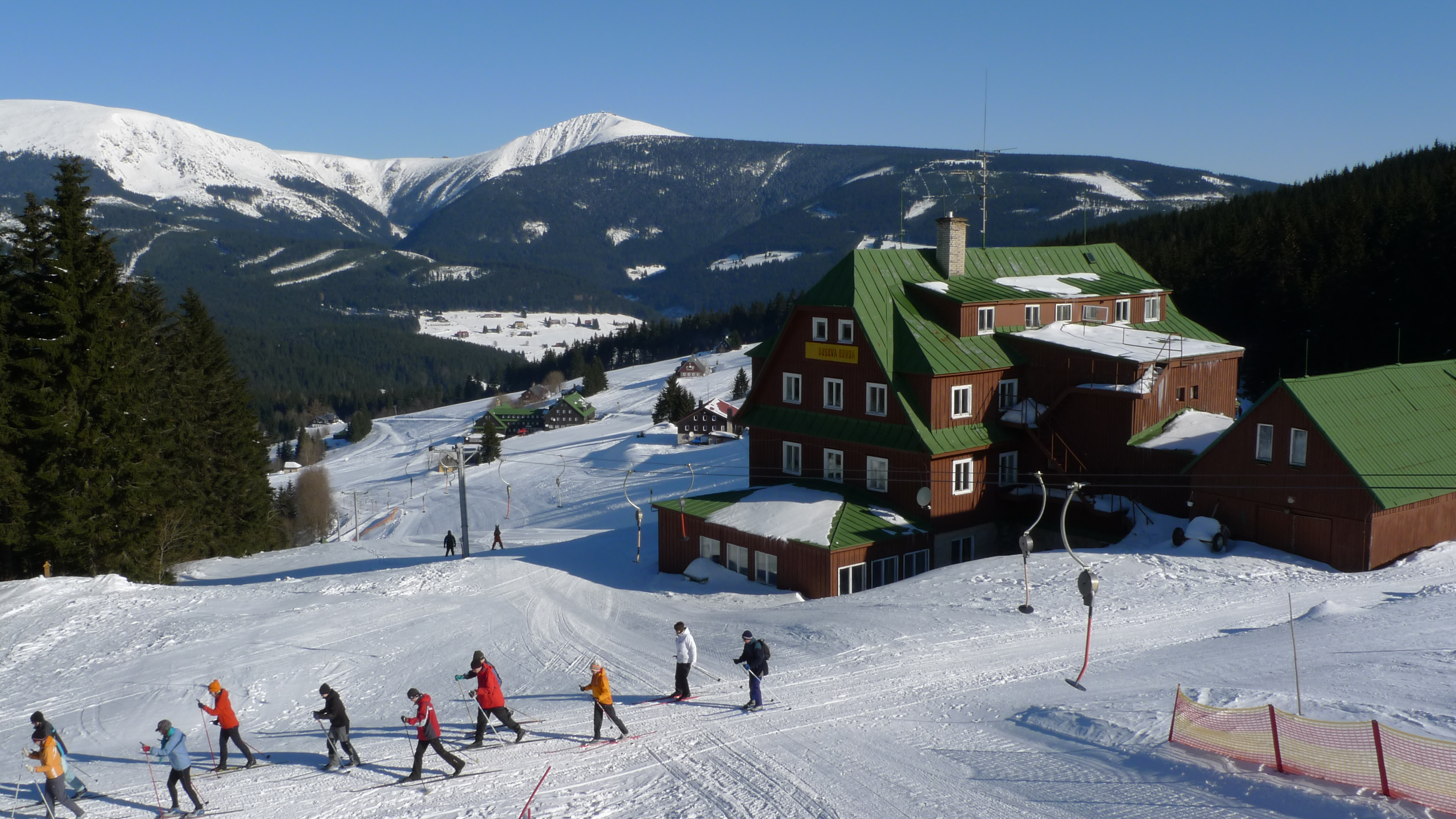
Ski resort in Pec pod Sněžkou

The ski resort is one of the best-known and most frequented mountain resorts in the Czech Republic. Pec pod Sněžkou provides a modern chairlift, 10 surface ski lifts with a transport capacity of 9,620 persons per hour, a jagged freestyle park, the longest and best-lit slope for evening skiing, a 900-metre-long bobsleigh track, a snow tubing ice channel, and a number of cross-country skiing routes. It is now included in SkiResort Černá hora – Pec, which forms the largest Czech ski resort.

== Sights ==
The Na Peci Tavern is a cultural monument. The house was built in 1793 and is an example of vernacular architecture.

The Chapel of the Virgin Mary was built in 1888 and renovated in 1933.

== Notable people ==
- Rudolf Franz Lehnert (1878–1948), Austrian photographer
- Gustl Berauer (1912–1986), German Nordic combined skier
- Miloslav Sochor (born 1952), alpine skier

== Twin towns – sister cities ==
Pec pod Sněžkou is twinned with:

- Karpacz, Poland

== See also ==
- Špindlerův Mlýn, the largest mountain resort in the Czech Republic
