= Krkonoše/Karkonosze Transboundary Biosphere Reserve =

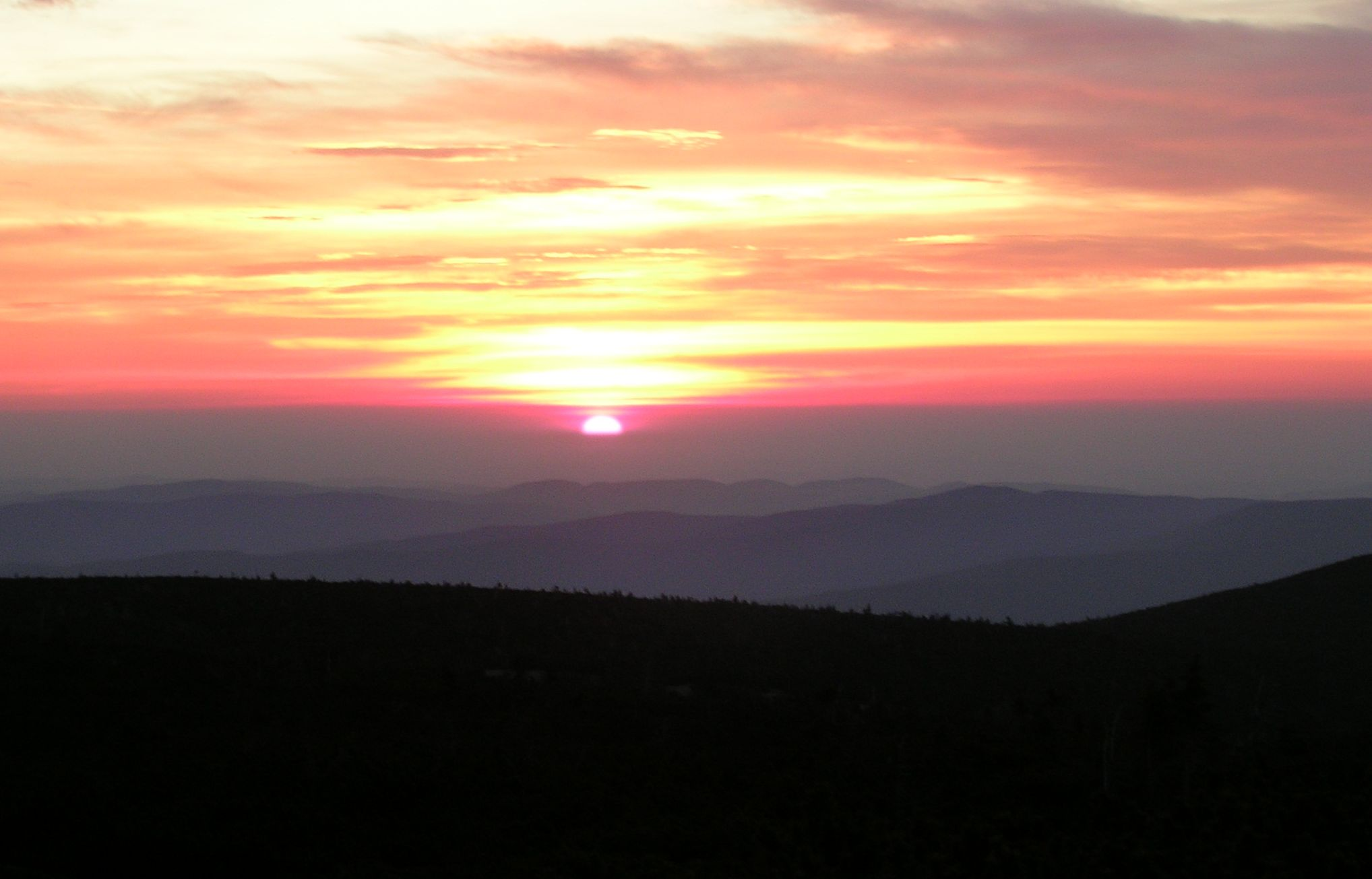
- View of Śnieżka in the Śnieżnik Landscape Park

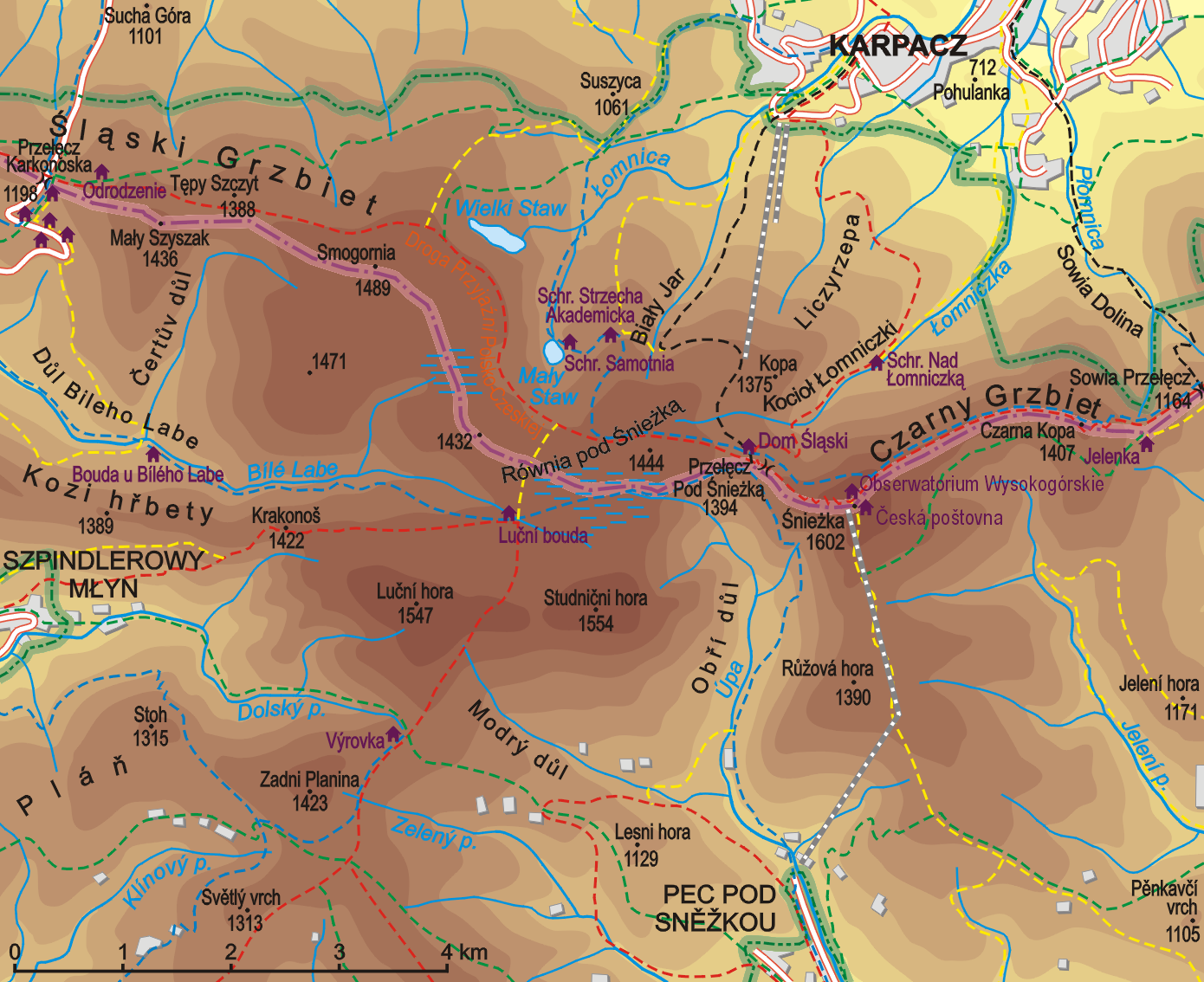
- Map of the central Krkonoše/Karkonosze
- Type: Biosphere Reserve
- Location: Czech Republic / Poland
- Coordinates: 50°42′36″N 15°38′14″E
- Area: 60,362 hectares (149,157.75 acres)
- Created: 1992
- Operator: Biosphere Reserve Bilateral Board
- Website: http://www.unesco.org/new/en/natural-sciences/environment/ecological-sciences/biosphere-reserves/europe-north-america/czech-reppoland/krkonosekarkonosze/

The Krkonoše/Karkonosze Transboundary Biosphere Reserve (Czech: [ˈkr̩konoʃɛ], Polish: [karkɔˈnɔʂɛ]) is a MAB transboundary biosphere reserve, mixed mountain and highland system designated by UNESCO as Krkonoše/Karkonosze Mountains in 1992. It is shared by the Czech Republic and Poland. Notably, it is one of only two successful transboundary management structures in existence, aside from the East Carpathians Biosphere Reserve, due to contrasting goals in other shared areas covered by MAB.

== Land cover characterization ==
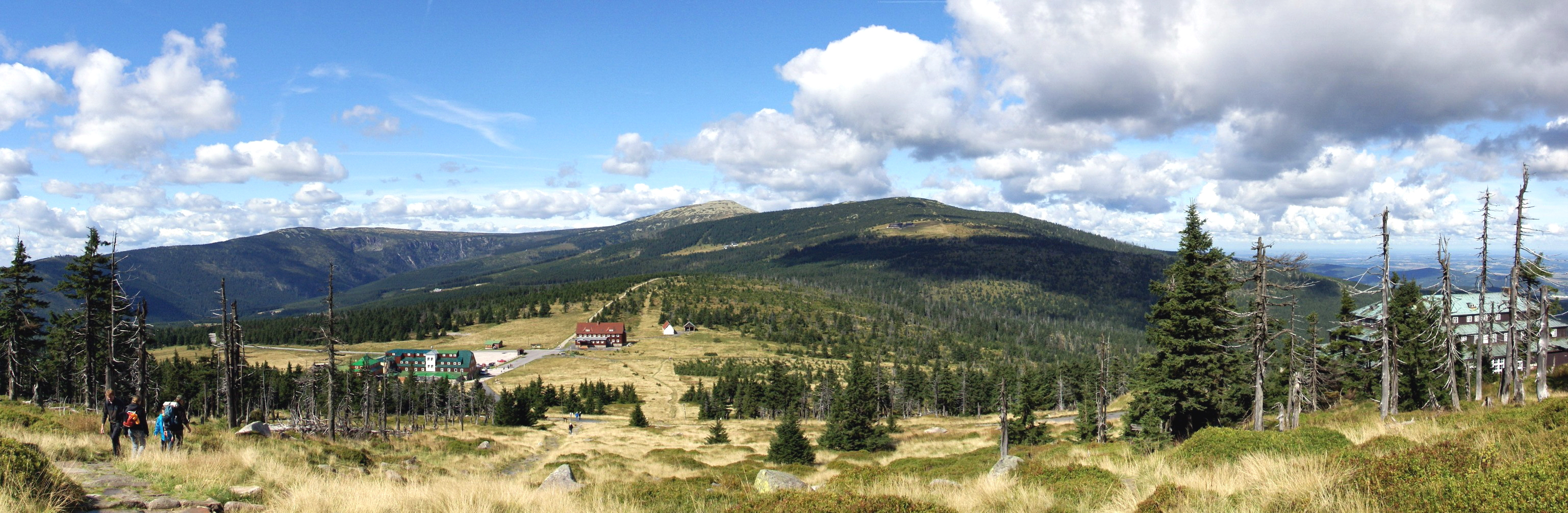
Krkonoše/Karkonosze Pass

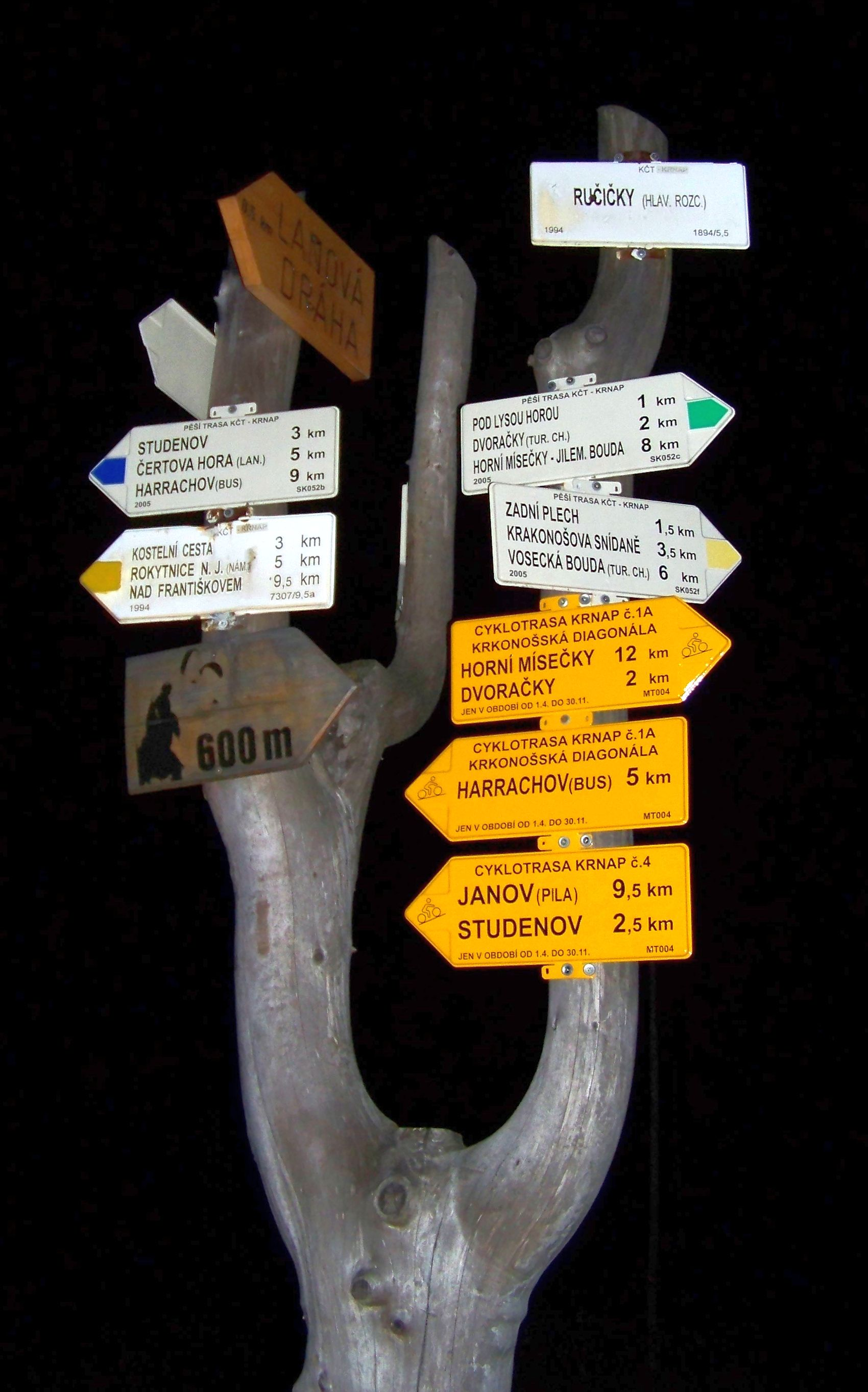
Although the reserve is shared by two countries, the actual trail blazes might not be bilingual

The Krkonoše/Karkonosze ecosystem is managed by the Biosphere Reserve Bilateral Board composed of Czech-Polish specialists, with financial aid from the Global Environment Facility (GEF). It is an ecological island, noted by UNESCO for its profusion of mountain meadows with a network of chalets, and a significant infrastructure both for winter-and-summer sports, as well as qualified tourism.

The landscape relief on the Polish side of the biosphere reserve differs from the Czech part considerably. It is very steep and therefore lacking in human development, but instead, it is covered by dense forests. However, both Polish and Czech mountains are equally impacted by heavy air pollution. The Giant Mountains are frequented by over 10 million visitors annually, mostly hikers and skiers, with about 6–8 million in the Czech Republic and 2,5–3 million on the Polish side of the system as of 2002.

== Environment ==
The Krkonoše/Karkonosze biosphere reserve programme is run by nine Czech-Polish working groups, each focusing on a separate topic area, including nature conservation, tourism, forestry management, and local communities among other things. Their Bilateral Board provides a forum for cross-border communication regarding legal matters as well as development plans and scientific research. The sun-drenched southern slopes differ from the northern slopes also in their habitat although both consist basically of alpine tundra vegetation with subarctic peat bogs and spruce forests. The network administration is shared between Krkonoše National Park and Karkonosze National Park authorities, with headquarters in Vrchlabí and Jelenia Góra respectively.
