= Rýchory =

Mountain ridge in the Czech Republic

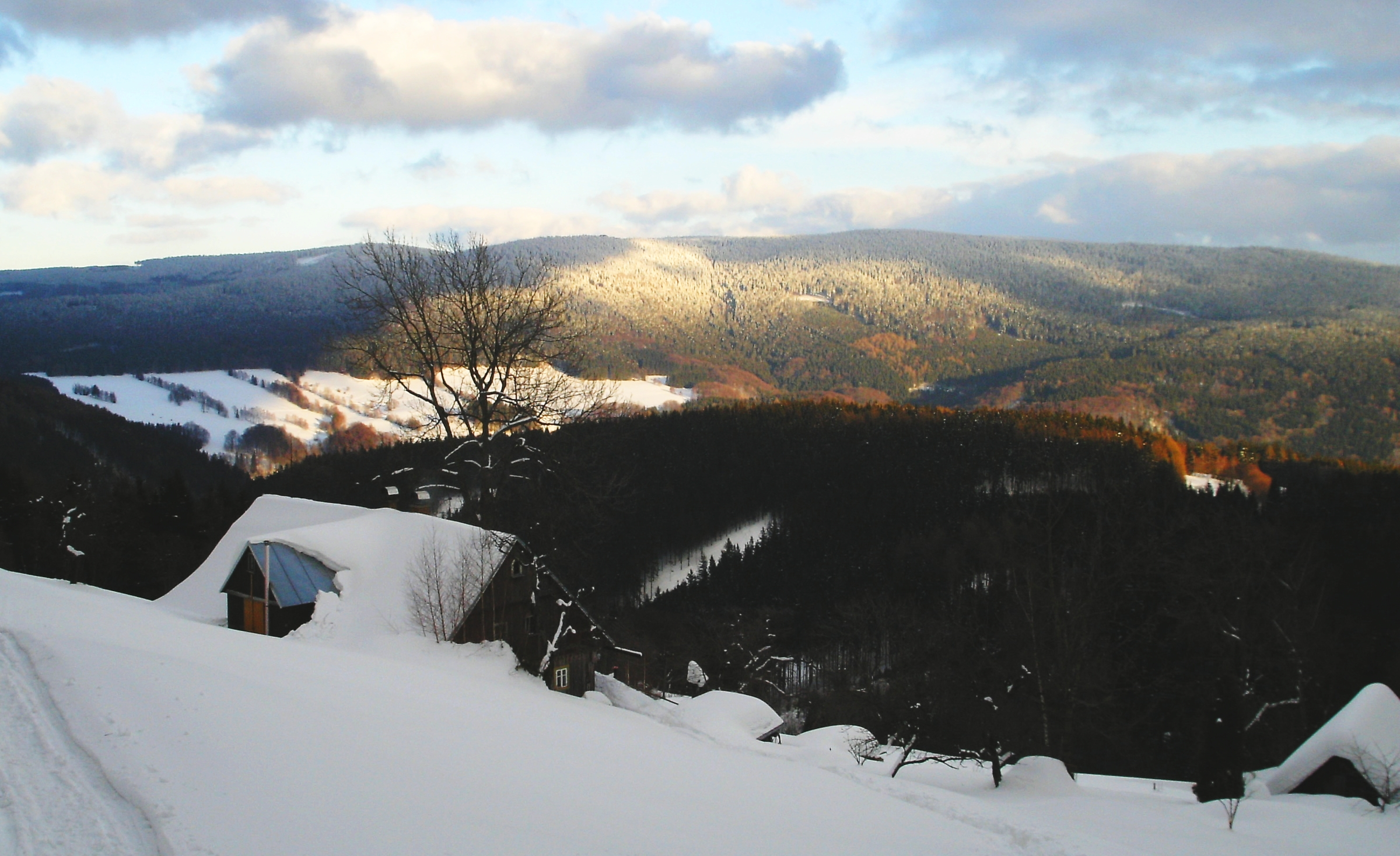
- View from the west

Highest point
- Elevation: 1,033 m (3,389 ft)
- Coordinates: 50°39′N 15°52′E

Geography
- Location within Czech Republic
- Location: Czech Republic
- Parent range: Giant Mountains

Rýchory (German: Rehorn, Rehorngebirge) is a mountain ridge in the eastern Giant Mountains in the Czech Republic. It is the easternmost tip of the Giant Mountains, forming a broad belt of forested ridges from Horní Lysečiny over the Mravenečník hill to the Sklenářovický vrch hill.

== Geography ==
Rýchory lies on the southeastern edge of the Giant Mountains. The main ridge is approximately 1.5 km long with the slopes included Rýchory are roughly 6 km long. They lie 10 km north of Trutnov. The ridge is oriented in northwest-southeast direction. The highest peak is Dvorský les (1033 m), which forms the south-eastern ending of the main ridge and it is the easternmost one-thousander in the Giant Mountains. The north-western ending is the peak Kutná (1001 m) with Rýchorská bouda mountain chalet. Between these two there are no other important peaks. A short side ridge branches to the south-west with a nameless peak of 1008 m. To the north, the pass Rýchorský kříž divides Rýchory from northward ridge towards the main part of the Giant Mountains.

Rýchory constitutes the easternmost part of the Krkonoše National Park and thanks to their rich botanical locations, the upper parts around the main ridge of Rýchory have been included in Zones I and II of the national park. The Dvorský les forest in Rýchory preserves a remaining area of beech primeval forest, consisting of the trunks of old beech, rowan, birch and spruce trees covered with moss and is a favourite location of nature photographers.

In the northern slopes of the Rýchory ridge and in the valley of the stream Sněžný potok is a small settlement called Rýchory as well, which forms part of the town Žacléř.

=== Climate ===
Climate data for Rýchorská bouda, 1991–2020 normals, extremes 1995–2013
Month	Jan	Feb	Mar	Apr	May	Jun	Jul	Aug	Sep	Oct	Nov	Dec	Year
Record high °C (°F)	11.0 (51.8)	11.5 (52.7)	14.5 (58.1)	23.3 (73.9)	27.7 (81.9)	29.4 (84.9)	29.5 (85.1)	29.8 (85.6)	25.8 (78.4)	20.5 (68.9)	14.1 (57.4)	13.2 (55.8)	29.8 (85.6)
Mean daily maximum °C (°F)	−1.8 (28.8)	−1.2 (29.8)	2.7 (36.9)	9.4 (48.9)	14.0 (57.2)	17.0 (62.6)	18.6 (65.5)	18.4 (65.1)	13.9 (57.0)	7.6 (45.7)	3.2 (37.8)	−1.0 (30.2)	8.4 (47.1)
Daily mean °C (°F)	−4.4 (24.1)	−4.0 (24.8)	−0.6 (30.9)	5.3 (41.5)	9.6 (49.3)	12.7 (54.9)	14.3 (57.7)	14.1 (57.4)	10.1 (50.2)	4.5 (40.1)	0.6 (33.1)	−3.6 (25.5)	4.9 (40.8)
Mean daily minimum °C (°F)	−7.3 (18.9)	−6.9 (19.6)	−3.8 (25.2)	1.6 (34.9)	5.6 (42.1)	8.6 (47.5)	10.5 (50.9)	10.4 (50.7)	7.0 (44.6)	2.0 (35.6)	−1.8 (28.8)	−6.2 (20.8)	1.6 (34.9)
Record low °C (°F)	−23.0 (−9.4)	−22.0 (−7.6)	−16.5 (2.3)	−12.4 (9.7)	−5.2 (22.6)	−3.0 (26.6)	2.6 (36.7)	1.7 (35.1)	−2.2 (28.0)	−9.7 (14.5)	−16.6 (2.1)	−20.5 (−4.9)	−23.0 (−9.4)
Average precipitation mm (inches)	104.0 (4.09)	88.0 (3.46)	81.7 (3.22)	44.4 (1.75)	66.2 (2.61)	88.6 (3.49)	116.3 (4.58)	107.7 (4.24)	85.4 (3.36)	76.2 (3.00)	81.6 (3.21)	99.1 (3.90)	1,039.2 (40.91)
Average snowfall cm (inches)	64.7 (25.5)	63.5 (25.0)	48.5 (19.1)	15.4 (6.1)	1.2 (0.5)	0.0 (0.0)	0.0 (0.0)	0.0 (0.0)	0.1 (0.0)	8.1 (3.2)	29.0 (11.4)	60.2 (23.7)	290.6 (114.4)
Average relative humidity (%)	91.3	89.0	82.9	71.2	71.1	73.5	75.3	73.9	81.7	89.8	93.7	93.2	82.2
Source: Czech Hydrometeorological Institute

== Gold mining ==
Based on legends, written down by chronicler Simon Hüttel of Trutnov, gold was mined on the slopes of Rýchory as early as 11th century, while the most important mines were founded during the reign of Duke Oldřich of Bohemia. First written record of gold mining is from the year 1542. Emperor Ferdinand I granted mining privileges to the market town Svoboda nad Úpou. A gold mining village Sklenářovice was also founded in a southern valley of Rýchory. Largest extent of gold mining came after 1648, when Emperor Ferdinand III confirmed the privileges of Svoboda nad Úpou. Mining was ended in 1742.

The gold of Rýchory is unique in Europe, because it contains palladium, other deposits with similar composition are only in Brazil.
