= Špindlerův Mlýn =

- Town
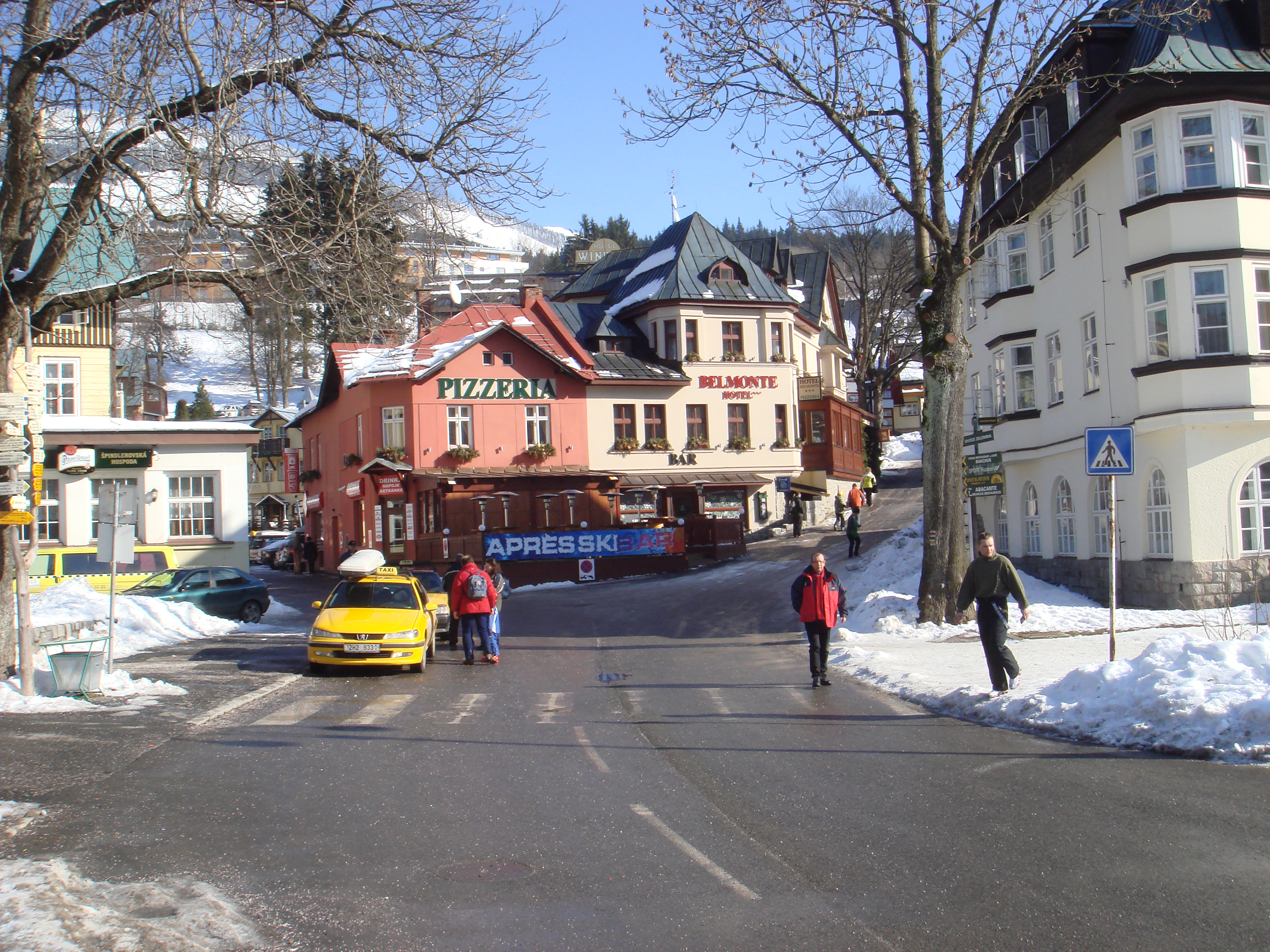
- Town centre

- Coat of arms

- Location in the Czech Republic
- Coordinates: 50°43′31″N 15°36′30″E
- Country: Czech Republic
- Region: Hradec Králové
- District: Trutnov
- First mentioned: 1676

Government
  - Mayor: Martin Jandura

Area
  - Total: 76.94 km^{2} (29.71 sq mi)
- Elevation: 718 m (2,356 ft)

Population (2026-01-01)
  - Total: 1,089
  - Density: 14.15/km^{2} (36.66/sq mi)
- Time zone: UTC+1 (CET)
  - Summer (DST): UTC+2 (CEST)
- Postal code: 543 51
- Website: www.spindleruvmlyn.org

Špindlerův Mlýn (Czech pronunciation: [ˈʃpɪndlɛruːv ˈmliːn]; German: Spindlermühle, Spindelmühle) is a town in Trutnov District in the Hradec Králové Region of the Czech Republic. It has about 1,100 inhabitants. The town is located in the Giant Mountains, on the upper course of the Elbe River. Špindlerův Mlýn is one of the most frequented ski resorts in the country.

== Administrative division ==
Špindlerův Mlýn consists of four municipal parts (in brackets population according to the 2021 census):

- Špindlerův Mlýn (343)
- Bedřichov (599)
- Labská (76)
- Přední Labská (41)

== Etymology ==
Špindlerův Mlýn, literally meaning "Špindler's mill", received its name after a mill belonging to the Špindler family, which was moved between the surrounding settlements Bedřichov, Labská and Svatý Petr in 1765. The municipality, which did not exist at that time yet, was given this name due to an official error. The locals wrote a request to the authorities there and signed it written in Špindler's mill, but the authorities mistakenly thought that they were giving the name to a new municipality. After the merger of scattered settlements into one municipality, the name remained. One of the German variations of its name, Spindelmühle, was also created by an error of authorities.

== Geography ==
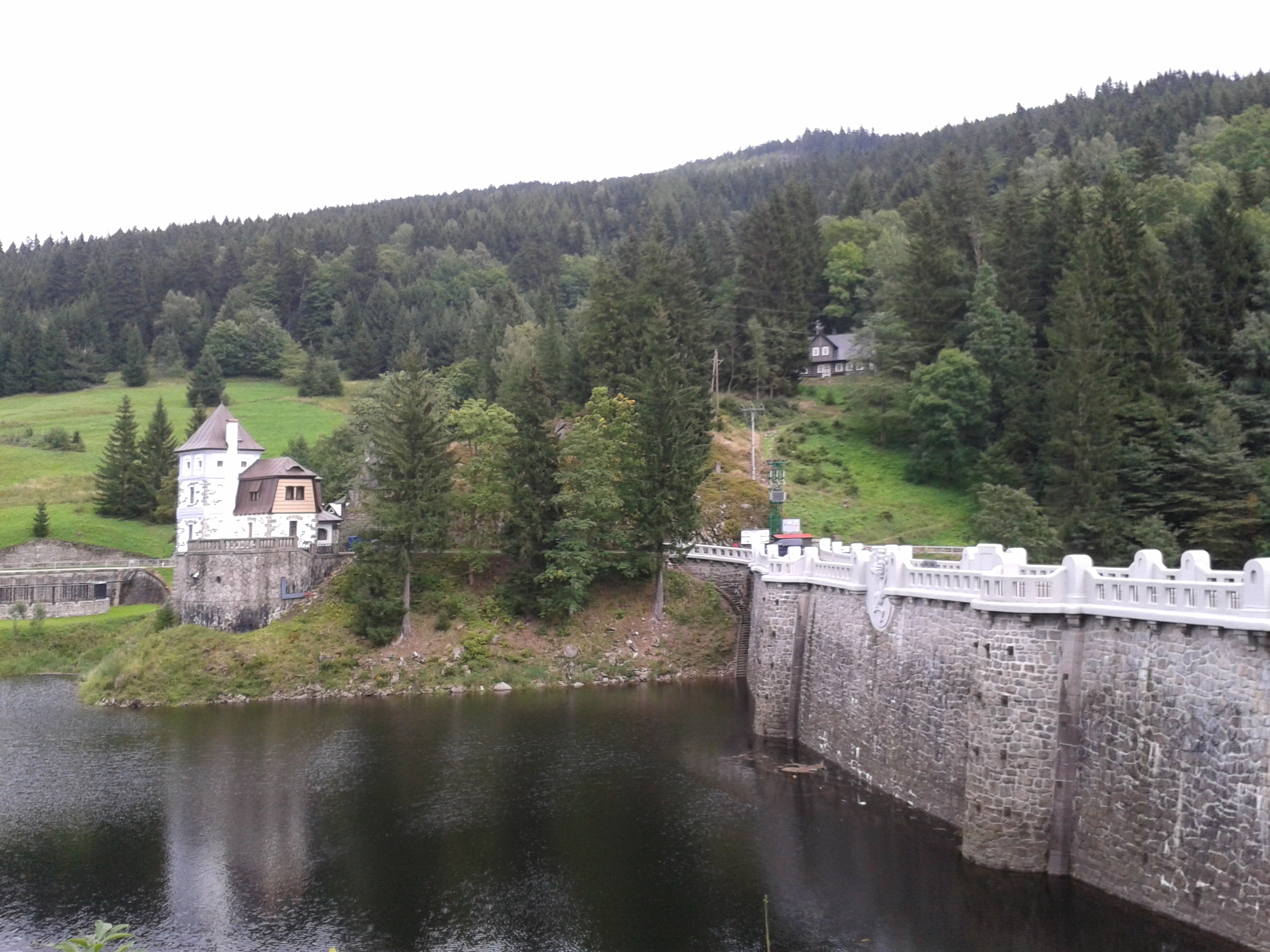
Labská Dam

Špindlerův Mlýn is located about 26 km (16 mi) northwest of Trutnov and 37 km (23 mi) east of Liberec, on the border with Poland. It lies in the Giant Mountains. In the east of the territory rises Luční hora, at 1,555 metres (5,102 ft) above sea level the second highest mountain of the Czech Republic. The town is situated in a valley between the Medvědín mountain and the ridges of Kozí hřbety and Pláň.

Špindlerův Mlýn lies at the confluence of the Elbe River and the stream Dolský potok. The Elbe source is located northwest of the town, near the Polish border, on the slopes of the Violík mountain at an altitude of 1,386 m (4,547 ft). About 1 km downstream are the Elbe Falls (Labský vodopád), which cascade about 30 m (98 ft) in depth. On the Pančava Stream, which flows into the Elbe near the Elbe Falls, is the Pančava Waterfall, which is the highest waterfall in the Czech Republic with a height of 148 m (486 ft). The Labská Dam with an area of 40 ha (99 acres) was built near the village of Labská in 1910–1914.

== History ==
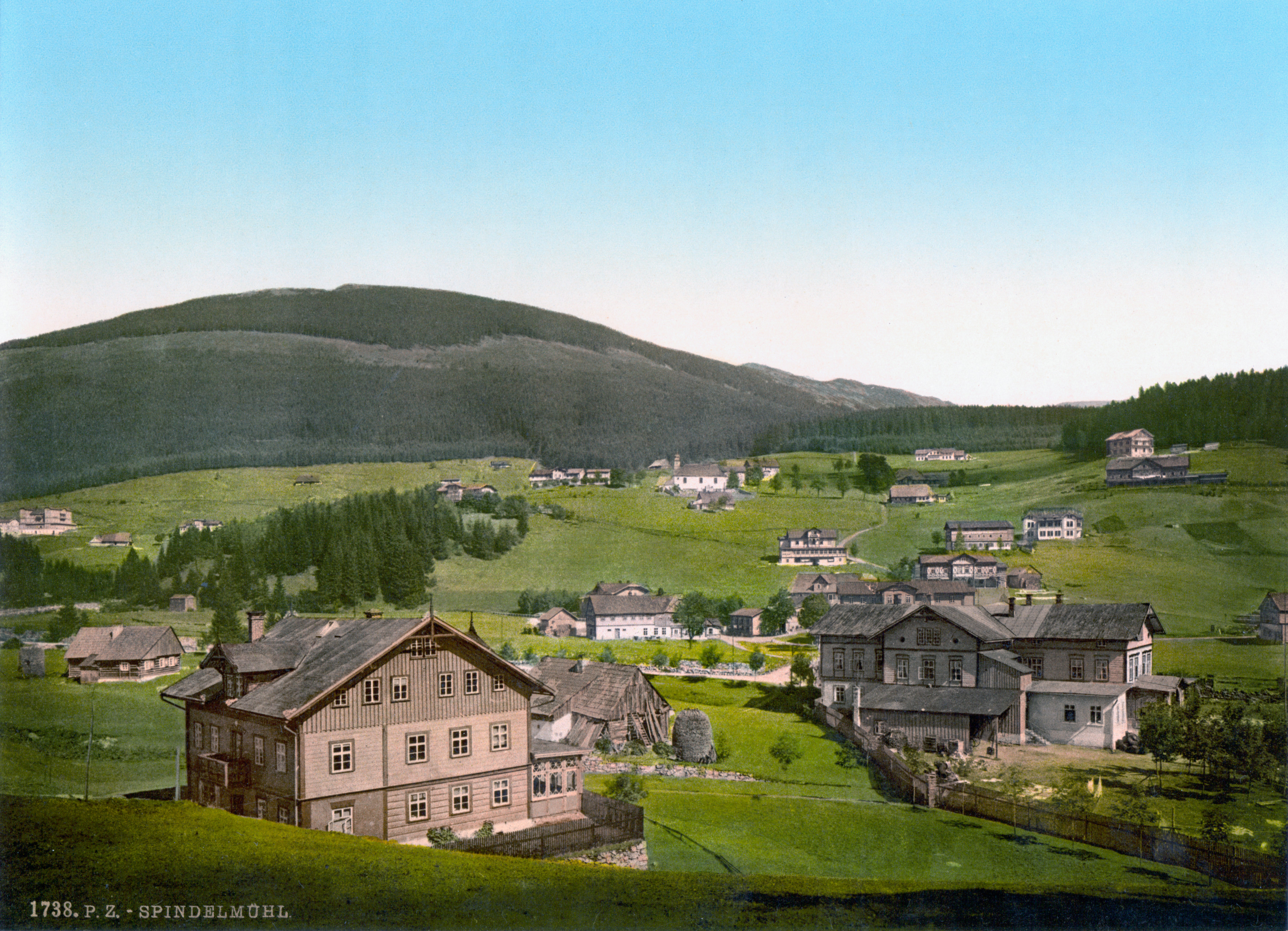
Špindlerův Mlýn in c. 1900

The area was covered by forests and not settled until the 16th century, when the first prospectors and then miners of silver and iron ore came. The miners and lumberjacks who came from Alps settled here and began to build huts. They took advantage of the experience from home and started raising cattle in the seemingly inhospitable mountains and farming in the clearings. The clearing became meadows and pastures, creating typical enclaves in the middle of forests, preserved to this day.

In the 18th century, large parts of the surrounding forests were a possession of the Habsburg minister Friedrich August von Harrach-Rohrau (1696–1749), after whom the village of Bedřichov (Friedrichsthal) is named. The Harrach family contributed to the improvement and development of the landscape. They founded several mountain huts all over the Giant Mountains. Jan Nepomuk František Count of Harrach (1828–1909) established a tourist route leading through Špindlerův Mlýn and established the first nature reserve in the Giant Mountains, located in the valley Labský důl on an area of more than 60 ha (150 acres).

During World War II, Špindlerův Mlýn was occupied by Germany. In 1941, the occupiers organized the German Ski Championships in the town. After the war, the town was restored to Czechoslovakia, and the remaining German-speaking population was expelled according to the Beneš decrees and Potsdam Agreement.

=== Tourism ===
After four travellers accommodated here in 1865, the locals recognised the tourist potential of this place, began to expand the huts and build hiking trails. The construction of the road from Vrchlabí in 1872 significantly contributed to the greater number of tourists. Poor buildings often became quality hotels. In 1909, operation of the electric lift for sledges, one of the first of its kind in Europe, started, which contributed to the reputation of the winter tourist resort.

== Demographics ==
Historical population

Year	Pop.	±%
1869	2,602	—
1880	2,437	−6.3%
1890	2,464	+1.1%
1900	2,541	+3.1%
1910	3,065	+20.6%

Year	Pop.	±%
1921	2,524	−17.7%
1930	2,700	+7.0%
1950	6,669	+147.0%
1961	1,428	−78.6%
1970	1,355	−5.1%

Year	Pop.	±%
1980	1,388	+2.4%
1991	1,220	−12.1%
2001	1,290	+5.7%
2011	1,502	+16.4%
2021	1,059	−29.5%

Source: Censuses

== Transport ==
There are no railways or major roads running through the municipal territory. In the Przełęcz Karkonoska mountain pass, there is the pedestrian border crossing Špindlerův Mlýn / Przesieka.

== Sport ==
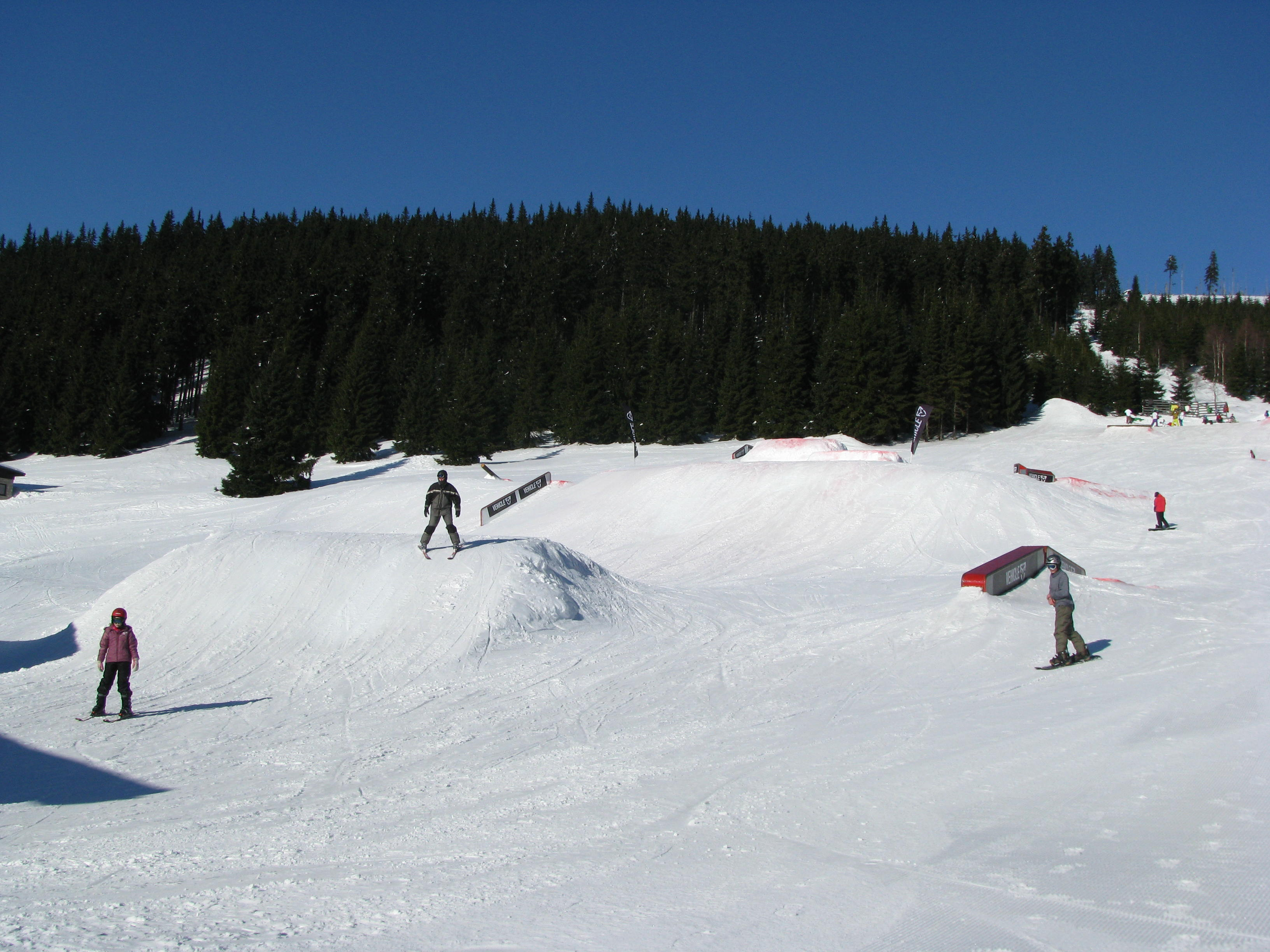
Ski resort Špindlerův Mlýn (Snowpark Horní Mísečky)

With year-round use and with accommodation capacity of 10,000 beds, Špindlerův Mlýn is one of the most visited ski resorts in the country. There are 26 km (16 mi) of 11 technically snow-covered downhill runs and 85 km (53 mi) of cross-country trails.

During the winter season the area hosts the Europacup in freestyle skiing and SnowJam, a professional snowboarding event. Some years, e.g. 2019, the Alpine Ski World Cup has been held here. In the surroundings there are many marked hiking, mountain biking and cross-country skiing trails.

Wildwater canoeing is also common on the Elbe River. One of the most demanding natural tracks in Central Europe and the hardest in the Czech Republic is located here.

== Sights ==
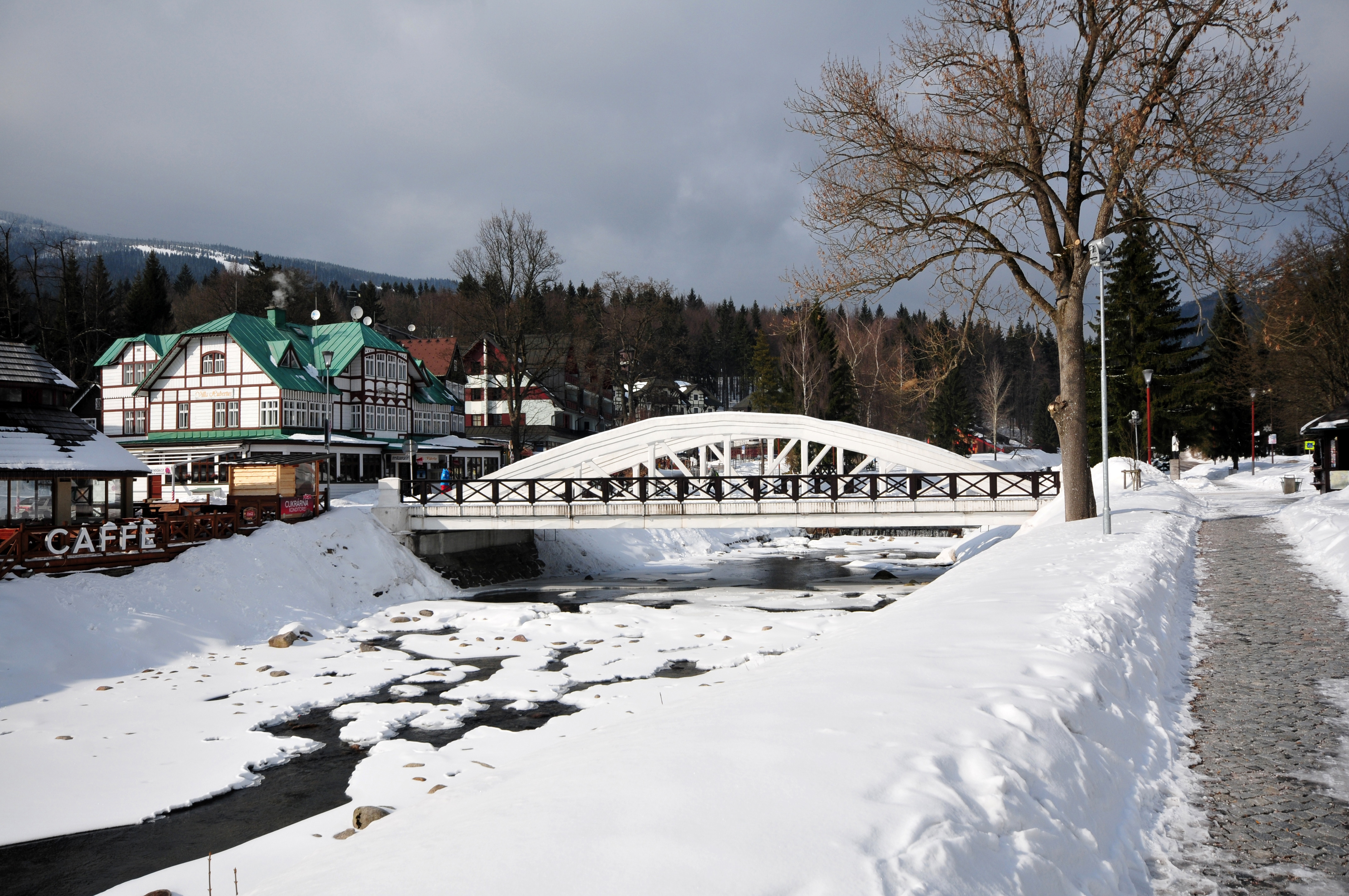
The bridge Bílý most

The main historical landmark of Špindlerův Mlýn is the Church of Saints Peter and Paul. It was built in the Neoclassical style in 1807.

A notable technical monument is the reinforced concrete arch bridge from 1911, called Bílý most ('white bridge').

== Notable people ==
- Anna K (born 1965), singer; raised here

Franz Kafka stayed here for recreation in 1922 and began writing of his famous work The Castle.

== Twin towns – sister cities ==
Špindlerův Mlýn is twinned with:

- Alanya, Turkey
- Podgórzyn, Poland
