= Jebavý =

Jebavý (feminine Jebavá) is a Czech surname. It is an adjective derived from the verb "jebat", which is a vulgar term for sexual intercourse. Notable people include:

- Jiří Jebavý, Czech ice hockey player
- Roman Jebavý, Czech tennis player
- Václav Jebavý (real name of Otokar Březina), Czech poet
