= Lukáš Pařízek =

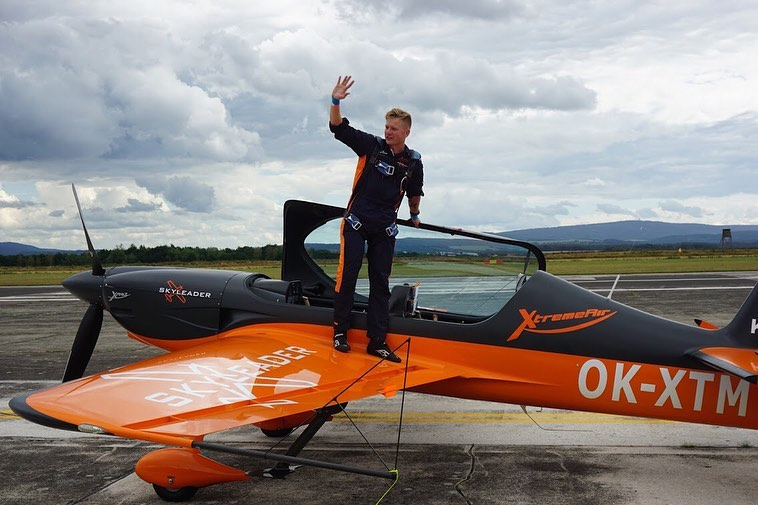
- Pařízek in 2020
- Born: 3 November 1990 (age 35); Vrchlabí, Czechoslovakia
- Education: Faculty of Civil Engineering, Czech Technical University in Prague
- Occupation: Aerobatic pilot
- Website: lukasparizek.aero

Lukáš Pařízek (born 3 November 1990) is a Czech aerobatic pilot. He has competed in both powered and glider aerobatics and has won the Czech national championship as well as medals at European competitions. He also won a bronze medal in the Free Known programme at the World Glider Aerobatics Championships.

== Biography ==
=== Early life ===
Pařízek was born in Vrchlabí, Czechoslovakia. He studied at the Faculty of Civil Engineering at the Czech Technical University in Prague.

=== Career ===
Pařízek began competing in aerobatics in 2016 in both powered aircraft and gliders. In his debut season he won the Sportsman category in glider aerobatics at a competition in Mladá Boleslav and finished third in the Sportsman category at the Czech National Aerobatic Championships in Břeclav.

He progressed through the Intermediate and Advanced categories in subsequent seasons, winning several national competitions including the Most Cup and Karlovy Vary Cup. In 2019 he won the Intermediate category at the Czech National Aerobatic Championship.

Pařízek achieved international success at the World Glider Aerobatics Championships in 2018, where he won a bronze medal in the Free Known routine and finished seventh overall. He later competed at the European Advanced Aerobatic Championship in 2022, where he won a team bronze medal with the Czech national team and finished sixth individually.

Since 2021 Pařízek has competed in the Unlimited category and flies the Extra 330 SC aircraft (registration OK-LPJ). In addition to competitions, he regularly performs aerobatic demonstrations at airshows in the Czech Republic.

== Selected competition results ==
=== World Championships ===
Year	Competition	Result
2018	World Glider Aerobatics Championships	Bronze medal (Free Known), 7th overall
2024	World Aerobatic Championship	21st place (Unlimited)

=== European Championships ===
Year	Competition	Result
2022	European Advanced Aerobatic Championship	Team bronze, 6th individual
