= Jiří Jebavý =

Czech ice hockey player

- Born: March 17, 1989 (age 36); Vrchlabí, Czechoslovakia
- Height: 6 ft 0 in (183 cm)
- Weight: 212 lb (96 kg; 15 st 2 lb)
- Position: Defence
- Shoots: Left
- 1st Czech Republic Hockey League team: HC Stadion Litoměřice
- Playing career: 2007–present

Jiří Jebavý is a Czech professional ice hockey defenceman who as of the 2021–22 season, plays for HC Stadion Litoměřice of the 1st Czech Republic Hockey League. He previously played for HC Slavia Praha of the Czech Extraliga.
