= ARGO-HYTOS =

Swiss hydraulics company

ARGO-HYTOS Management + Consulting GmbH
- Type: GmbH
- Founded: 1947
- Headquarters: Zug, Switzerland
- Key people: Christian H. Kienzle, Owner
- Number of employees: ca. 1200
- Website: http://www.argo-hytos.com

The ARGO-HYTOS Group produces and develops components and systems for the hydraulic industry. Its headquarters are in Switzerland and production sites are in Germany, Czech Republic, India, China and Brazil.

== History ==
The present ARGO-HYTOS group has its seeds in the former company Argo GmbH for precision mechanics. It was established in Stuttgart on July 7, 1947, at the request of Herbert Kienzle, the managing director of the Kienzle Apparate, and has developed from the former sales company for Kienzle-Taximeters. Argo originally was a brand name of the predecessor company Kienzle Apparate for manufacturing of taximeters, referring to the Greek legend of Jason and his incredibly fast ship.

An autonomous production program for magnetic filters and strainers was developed; in 1952 Argo received a patent for magnetic filters. The product portfolio was expanded to hydraulic filters for mobile and industrial hydraulics, which were produced in a former cigar factory in Kraichtal/Germany. In 1965 the head office was also transferred to Kraichtal. The company expanded internationally: At the beginning of the 1980s the first own sales company was established abroad in France, followed by more companies in the Netherlands, Great Britain, in the US, Sweden, Hong Kong, Italy, Poland and China.

== Development ==
In 1990 Christian H. Kienzle took over the position of the managing director and has managed the ARGO-HYTOS group up until now. In 1993 the Argo GmbH for precision mechanics was renamed as Argo GmbH for fluid technology. In the same year Argo purchased shares in the Czech hydraulic manufacturer Hytos, a company already having a 50-year experience in the production of components for Fluid & Motion Control. Since 2003 both companies have traded under the name ARGO-HYTOS.

== Locations ==
The ARGO-HYTOS group operates globally with numerous sales companies all over the world and more than 100 international distributors. The group is headquartered in Switzerland and employs more than 1,200 staff members.

ARGO-HYTOS maintains locations with production plants in

- Kraichtal (Germany) - approx. 450 employees
- Ostrava (Czech Republic)
- Vrchlabí (Czech Republic)
- Zator (Poland)
- Coimbatore (India)
- Yangzhou (China)

== Portfolio and customers ==
The portfolio of ARGO-HYTOS includes hydraulic filters and filter elements, components for Fluid & Motion Control, Fluid Management Systems, Sensors- and Measurement Technology as well as systems for Wind Energy Plants. The company's customers include manufacturers of agricultural machinery, production machines and machine tools, construction machines, municipal engineering and energy production.

== Literature ==
- Armin Müller: Kienzle. Ein deutsches Industrieunternehmen im 20. Jahrhundert. Franz Steiner Verlag, Stuttgart 2011, S. 221–225. ISBN 978-3-515-09845-8.
- Bernhard Foitzik: Filtration Technology for Hydraulic Systems: Optimum concepts for filtration systems in fluid power technology. 2nd edition, Verlag Moderne Industrie, Landsberg/Lech 2000, ISBN 3-478-93136-3.
