= Josephine Kablik =

Czech botanist and paleontologist (1787–1863)

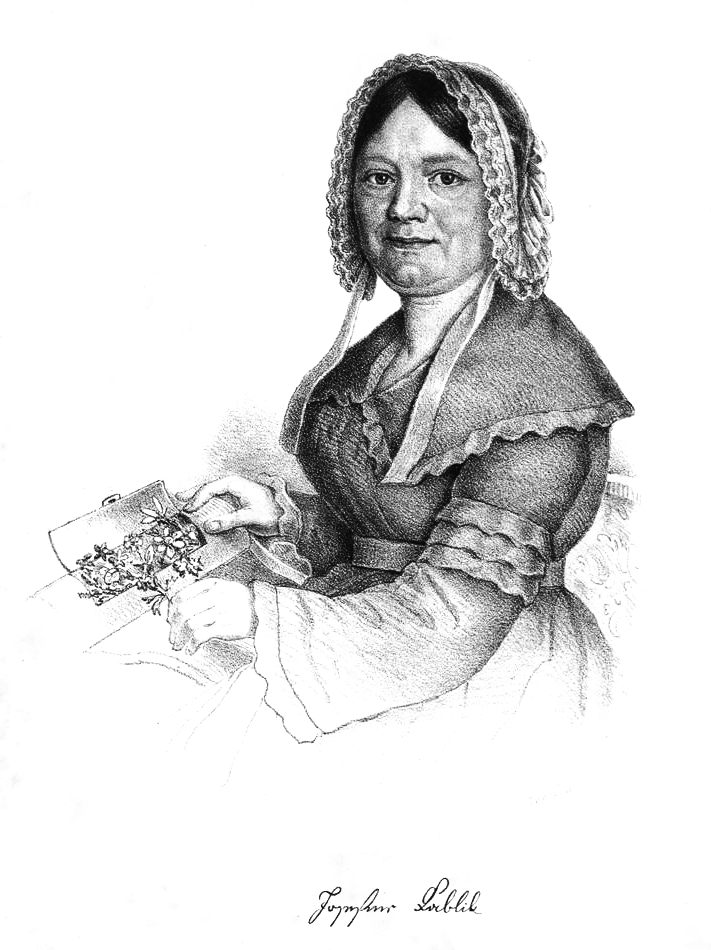
- Portrait by Quido Mánes, 1860
- Born: Josephine Ettel; 9 March 1787; Vrchlabí, Bohemia
- Died: 21 July 1863 (aged 76); Vrchlabí, Bohemia
- Other name: Josefina Kablíková
- Occupations: Botanist, paleontologist
- Spouse: Adalbert Kablik

Josephine Ettel Kabli[c]k, also given as Josefina Kablíková (9 March 1787 – 21 July 1863), was a Czech pioneering botanist and paleontologist. She studied under the best botanists of her time. She collected plant and fossil samples for institutions throughout Europe. Several fossil animals and plants described from her collections. The plant species Petasites kablikianus and the fossil organism Amphisauropus kablikae are named in her honour.

== Life ==
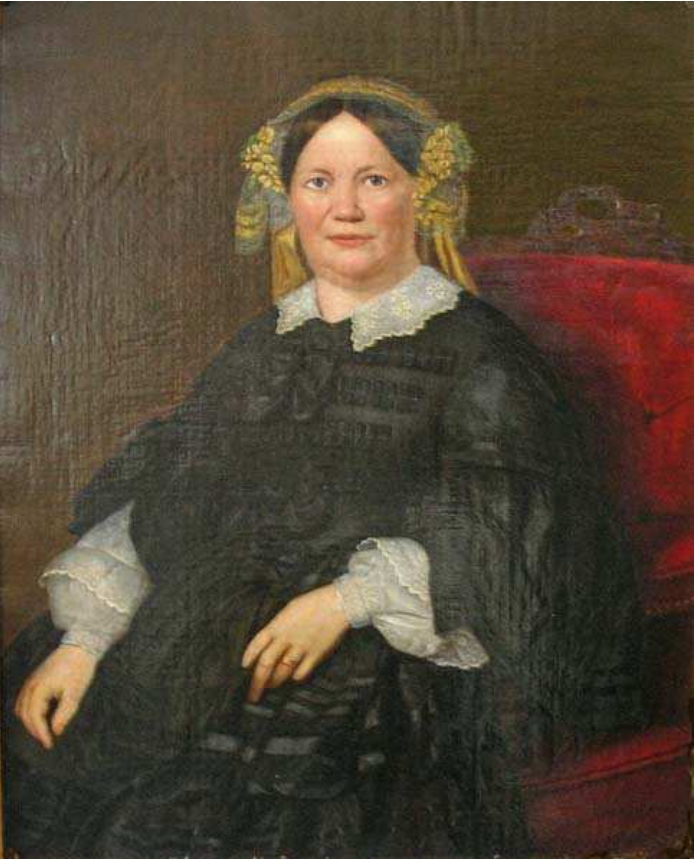
Oil portrait in collection of Krkonošsé museum

Josephine Ettel was born in Vrchlabí (then Hohenhelbe) in Bohemia, Habsburg monarchy, the daughter of a paper manufacturer David Ettel. She married pharmacist Adalbert Kablik in 1806 in Hohenhelbe who very supportive of his wife's interests. In 1822–1823, she had lessons in botany from Wenzel Blasius Mann. Kablik created her own herbarium to hold her collections of plants from around Hohenhelbe. She especially liked lichens. She was not discouraged by bad weather and ventured into the field to "traipse through forest and climb high mountains in order to search for new species of plants and fossils." She was extremely strong and healthy and became an enthusiastic collector of specimens in all weather. She collected plant and fossil samples especially from the Sudetes for schools, museums, learned societies and universities throughout Europe. She travelled to Switzerland and Italy and in 1862 to Salzburg.

Filip Maximilian Opiz's Interchangeable Institute for the exchange of herbarium specimens (German Pflanzentausch-Anstalt) lists over 25,000 specimens collected by her. In addition to botany, she also had an avid interest in paleontology and collected fossil animals and plants.

Kablik was the first woman to be admitted to the Botanical Society in Vienna. Her admission into the Regensburgische Botanische Gesellschaft in 1841 required the objections of Carl Friedrich Philipp von Martius to be overcome.

== Sources ==
- The Biographical Dictionary of Women in Science By Marilyn Bailey Ogilvie and Joy Harvey. Published Taylor & Francis (2000). ISBN 0-415-92039-6. Accessed October 2023
- The Hidden Giants By Sethanne Howard, Published 2007, Lulu.com. ISBN 1-4303-0076-0. Accessed April 2008
- Biographisches Lexikon des Kaiserthums Oesterreich German wikisource. Accessed February 2014.
- Thesis by Limberská, Jana (2015)
