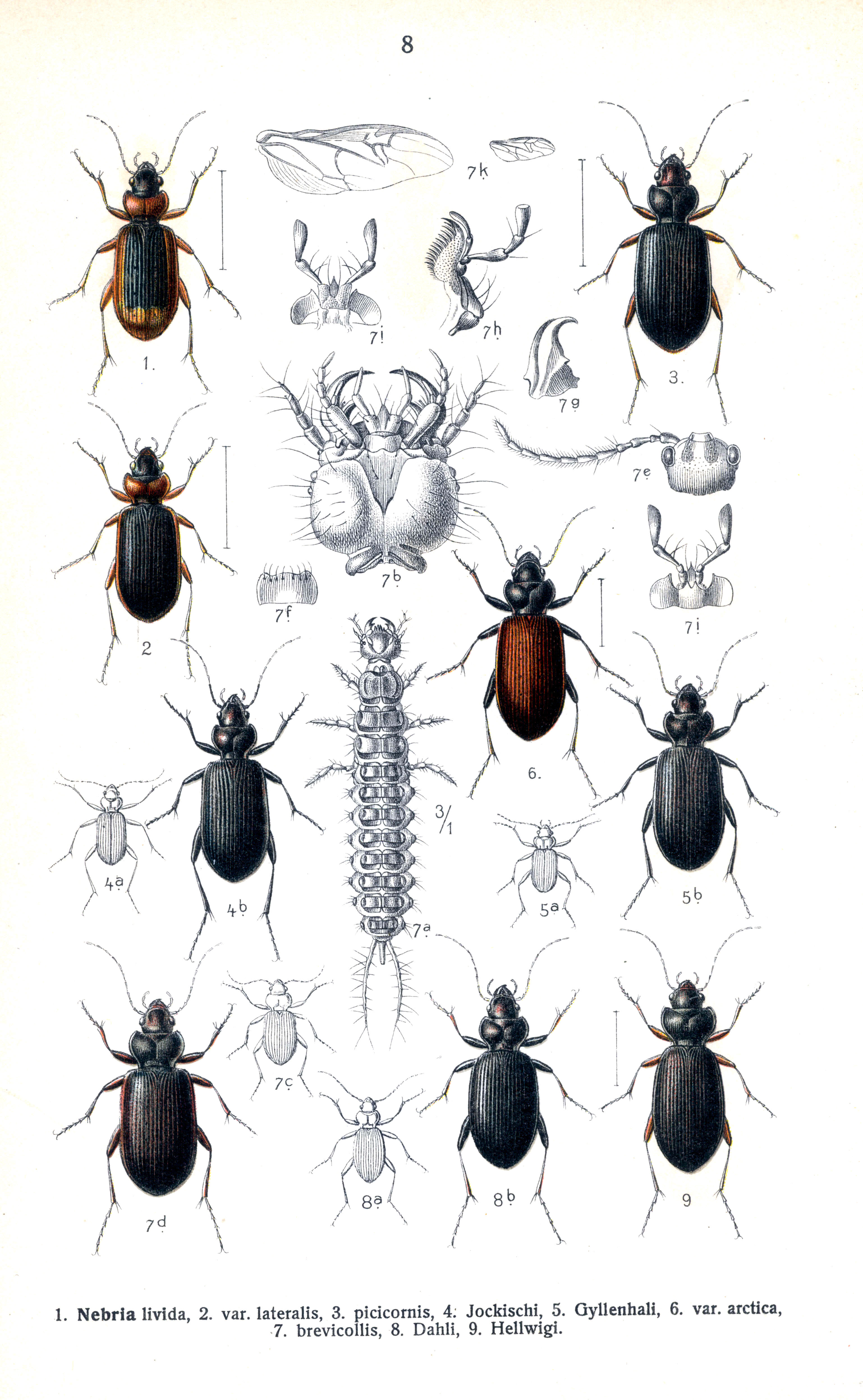

Scientific classification
- Domain: Eukaryota
- Kingdom: Animalia
- Phylum: Arthropoda
- Class: Insecta
- Order: Coleoptera
- Suborder: Adephaga
- Family: Carabidae
- Genus: Nebria
- Species: N. rufescens

Binomial name
- Nebria rufescens (Stroem, 1768)

Synonyms
- Carabus rufescens Stroem, 1768 [species]; Carabus rufescens Stroem, 1768 [nominotypical subspecies]; Helobia aethiops Stephens, 1828; Nebria arctica Dejean, 1826; Nebria attenuata Motschulsky, 1866; Nebria balbi Bonelli, 1810; Nebria baltica Motschulsky, 1866; Nebria besseri Fischer von Waldheim, 1828; Nebria dubia R.F. Sahlberg, 1844; Nebria geniculata Gredler, 1857; Nebria gerhardti Gabriel, 1899; Carabus gyllenhali Schonherr, 1806; Nebria hiemalis Gistel, 1857; Nebria hyperborea Gyllenhal, 1827; Helobia impressaNewman 1833; Nebria jamata Motschulsky, 1866; Carabus jockischii Duftschmid, 1812; Helobia marshallana Stephens, 1827; Nebria nivalis Heer, 1837; Nebria schneideri Munster, 1885; Nebria subacuminata Chaudoir, 1843; Helobia castanipes Kirby, 1837; Nebria curtulata Casey, 1924; Nebria labradorica Casey, 1920; Nebria prominens Casey, 1920; Nebria elias Motschulsky, 1866; Nebria moesta LeConte, 1850

= Nebria rufescens =

Species of beetle

Nebria rufescens is a species of ground beetle in the Nebriinae subfamily that can be found everywhere in Europe, except for Benelux, Bosnia and Herzegovina, Denmark, Monaco, San Marino, Vatican City, and various European islands. The range extends from western and northern Europe to Siberia and North America. The habitat consists of montane or submontane areas where it can be found along the banks of rocky streams.

Adults are somewhat large (9-12 mm) and black.

== Subspecies ==
- Nebria rufescens rufescens - upland heart-shield (Ireland, Great Britain, Norway, Sweden, Finland, France, Germany, Switzerland, Austria, Czechia, Slovakia, Hungary, Poland, Latvia, Belarus, Ukraine, Faroe Islands, Spain, Italy, Slovenia, Croatia, (former) Yugoslavia, North Macedonia, Albania, Greece, Bulgaria, Romania, China, North Korea, Russia)
- Nebria rufescens castanipes (Kirby, 1837) (USA, Canada, Alaska, Greenland) - chestnut-legged gazelle beetle
- Nebria rufescens lassenensis Kavanaugh, 1979 (California, Oregon) - lassen gazelle beetle
- Nebria rufescens lindrothi Kavanaugh, 1979 (Arizona, Colorado, New Mexico, Utah, Wyoming) - Lindroth's gazelle beetle
- Nebria rufescens munsteri Larsson & Gigja, 1959 (Iceland)
- Nebria rufescens rishiriensis Habu, 1972 (Japan)
