= Dvorský les =

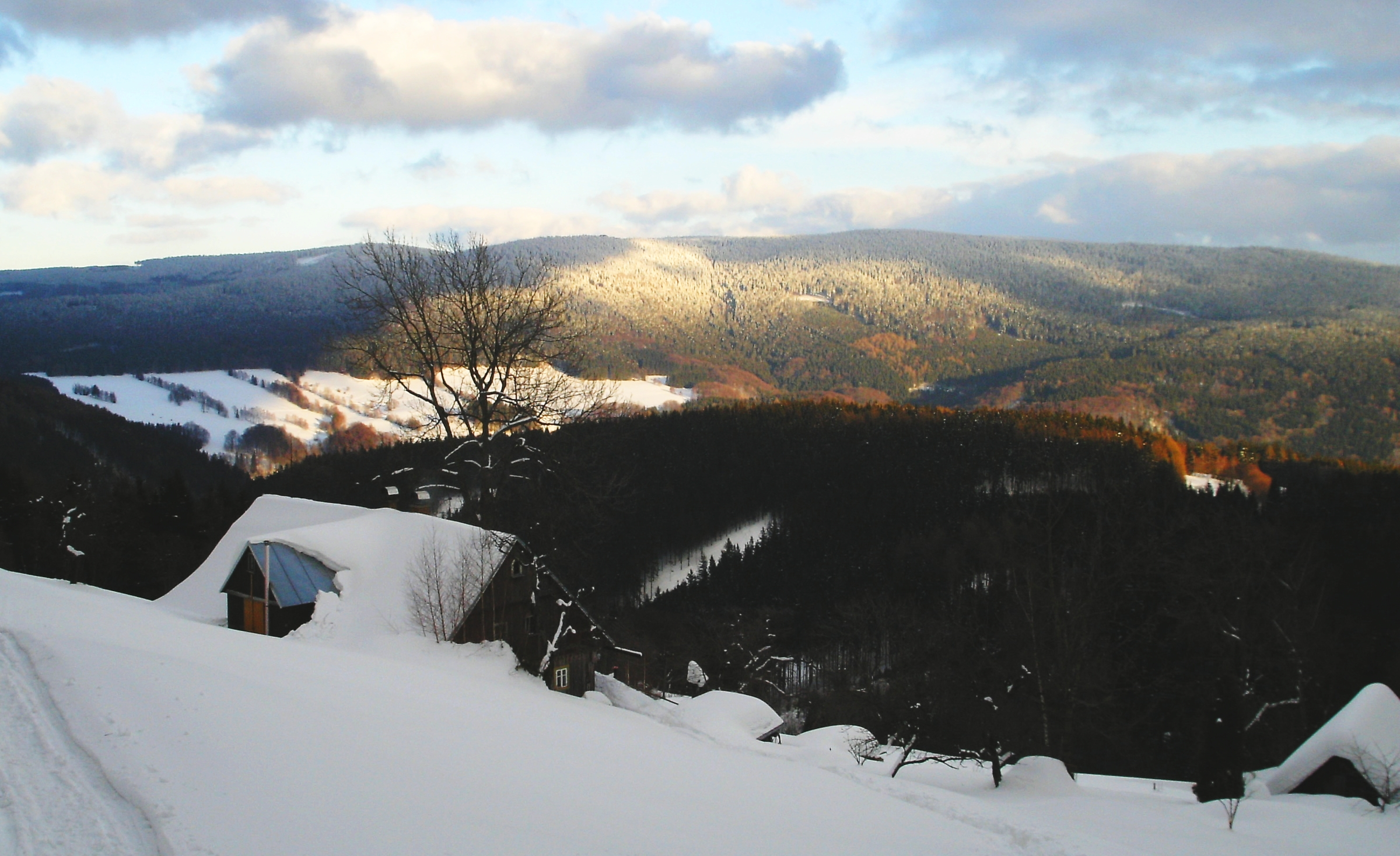
- Rýchory přes Úpské údolí: Mravenečník, Kutná a Dvorský les

Highest point
- Prominence: 178 m (584 ft)přechod Niedamirów
- Parent peak: Sněžka
- Isolation: 6 km (3.7 mi)
- Coordinates: 50°38′52″N 15°51′56″E

Geography
- Location within Czech Republic
- Country: Czech Republic
- Parent range: Giant Mountains

Dvorský les (German: Hoflbusch) is a mountain in the Czech Republic. It is the highest peak of Rýchory ridge in the Giant Mountains.

== Geography ==
Dvorský les is the easternmost One-thousander of Krkonoše. It marks the eastern end of the main ridge of Rýchory. It is located approximately 3.5 km (2.2 mi) southwest from Žacléř, 10 km (6.2 mi) north from Trutnov and 6 km (3.7 mi) east from Janské Lázně. The mountain is located in Krkonoše National Park.
