= Krkonoše National Park =

National park in the Czech Republic

- IUCN category II (national park)
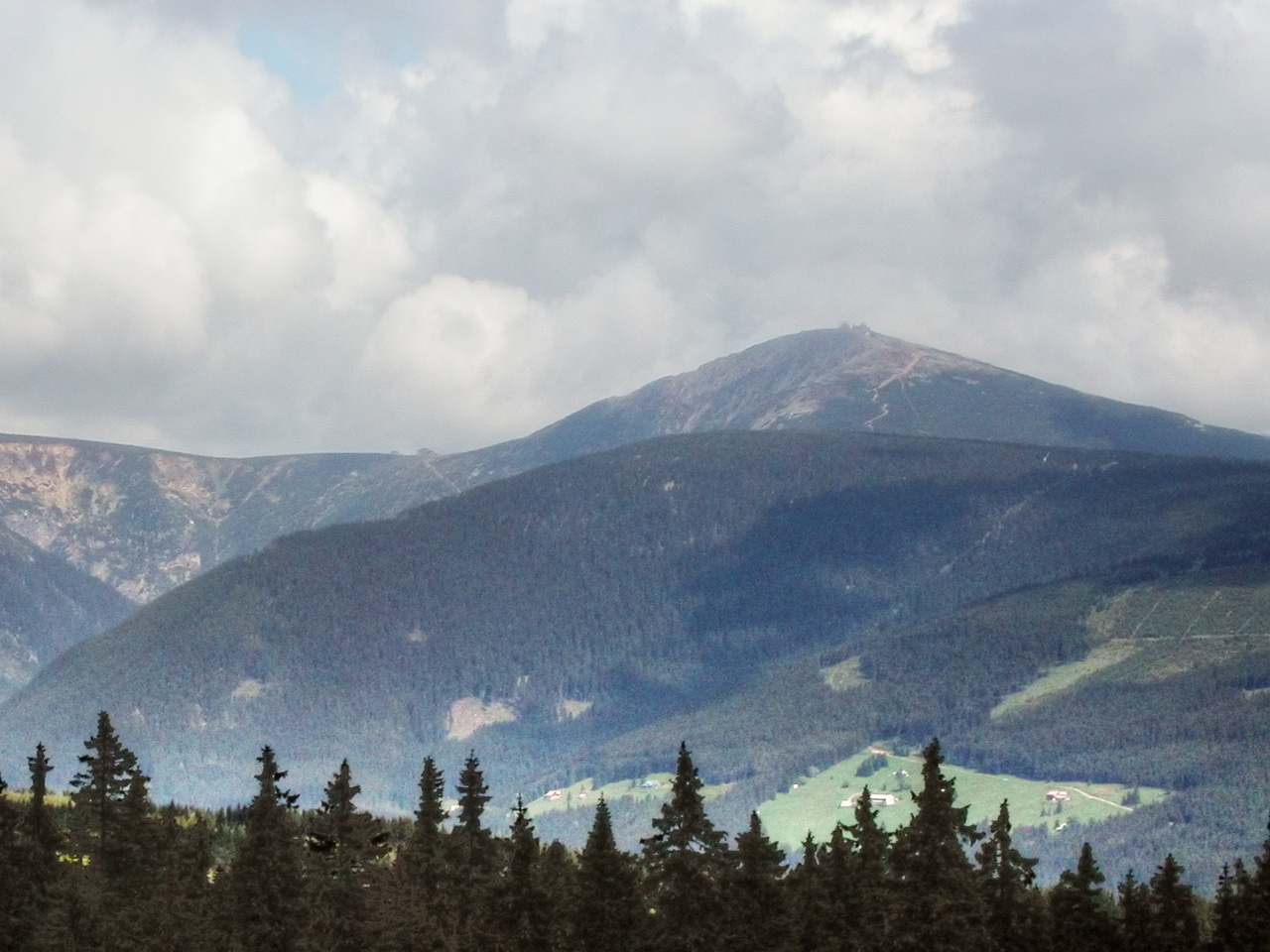
- Sněžka Mountain from Černá hora Park logo

- Location within Czech Republic
- Location: Czech Republic
- Coordinates: 50°44′10″N 15°44′25″E
- Length: 35 km (22 mi)
- Width: 15 km (9.3 mi)
- Area: 363.52 km^{2} (140.36 sq mi)
- Max. elevation: 1,603 m (5,259 ft)
- Min. elevation: 413 m (1,355 ft)
- Established: 17 May 1963
- Operator: Správa KRNAP
- Website: www.krnap.cz

Krkonoše National Park (Czech: Krkonošský národní park, abbreviated as KRNAP) is a national park in the Liberec and Hradec Králové regions of the Czech Republic. It covers most of the Giant Mountains (Czech: Krkonoše), which is the highest range of the country. The park has also been listed as a UNESCO Biosphere Reserve site. It borders Karkonosze National Park in Poland.

Krkonoše's highest mountain is Sněžka at 1,603 m (5,259 ft), which is also the highest mountain of the entire Czech Republic. The area of the national park is 363.52 km^{2} (140.36 sq mi). The protection zone of the park covers 186.18 km^{2} (71.88 sq mi). The National Park management headquarters are located in the town of Vrchlabí.

== History ==
The first steps towards nature conservation in the Giant Mountains were taken as early as 1952, when state nature reserves were declared, including Kotelní jámy, Pančavská louka and Labský důl. These areas were supervised by nature conservationists subordinate to the Regional National Committee in Hradec Králové, among whom were prominent nature conservationists such as Zdeněk Pilous, Jindřich Ambrož and Josef Šourek. Their task was not only to monitor the condition of protected areas, but also to draw attention to inappropriate interventions in the landscape and to promote appropriate conservation measures.

Conservationists had to face various challenges, including pressure from intensive tourism and economic exploitation of the landscape. The basis for the future management of the park was not only the professional knowledge, but also the practical experience of conservators who had already worked on the protection of key sites in previous years. Thanks to their efforts, it was possible to create a comprehensive protection system that was to ensure the preservation of the unique nature of the Giant Mountains for future generations. Over time, the need for a more comprehensive approach to the protection of the Giant Mountains grew, which led to the preparation and subsequent proclamation of the Krkonoše National Park (KRNAP).

The Krkonoše National Park was proclaimed on 17 May 1963 by Government Decree No. 41/1963, four years after the Polish Krkonoše National Park (Karkonoski Park Narodowy), which was established on 16 January 1959. In 1986, the national park was expanded to include a protective zone by Government Decree No. 58/1986 Coll. The statute of the Krkonoše National Park was re-proclaimed by Government Decree No. 165/1991 Coll.: "The mission of the national park is to preserve and improve its natural environment, in particular the protection or restoration of self-governing functions of natural systems, strict protection of wild animals and plants, preservation of the typical appearance of the landscape, fulfillment of scientific and educational goals, as well as the use of the national park area for ecologically sustainable tourism and recreation that does not deteriorate the environment." The last legislative re-proclamation of the Krkonoše National Park was Act No.123/2017 Coll., amending Act No. 114/1992 Coll., on Nature and Landscape Protection (KRNAP is promulgated under Section 15b).

== Park zoning ==
Until 30 June 2020, the territory of the national park was divided into three protection zones - strict natural (zone 1), managed natural (zone 2) and marginal (zone 3). In zone 1 of the national park, entry outside marked paths was prohibited. In zones 2 and 3, visitors could move freely on foot and through meadows and forests (however, in forests, there is a general ban on skiing outside paths according to the Forest Act).

Since 1 July 2020, the KRNAP territory has been divided into four care zones:

- natural zone (A) - total area of 7,327.6 ha, i.e. 20.2% of the KRNAP territory,
- a zone close to nature (B) - total area of 8,106.8 ha, i.e. 22.3% of the KRNAP territory,
- zone of concentrated nature care (C) - total area of 20,702.3 ha, i.e. 57.0% of the KRNAP territory,
- cultural landscape zone (D) - total area 183.7 ha, i.e. 0.5% of the territory of KRNAP.

The management zoning does not affect the movement of people in the national park. The movement of people is newly regulated by the so-called quiet areas. There are currently eight of them declared. Where quiet areas are marked, it is possible to move only along marked paths. Quiet areas cover 22.2% of the KRNAP territory and mostly copy the borders of the original 1st protection zone.

The original area of the national park was reduced in 1991 from 385 km^{2} to the current 363.52 km^{2}. The borders of KRNAP moved further into the mountains and the built-up areas of most municipalities were removed from KRNAP, which were reassigned to a protection zone, in which protection is at a similar level to that in a protected landscape area. In 1992, both national parks on the Czech and Polish sides were jointly included in the UNESCO network of biosphere reserves. There are peat bogs in the territory of KRNAP, included in the list of wetlands of world importance according to the Ramsar Convention. KRNAP and its Polish counterpart, the Krkonoše National Park (Karkonoski Park Narodowy), are certified transboundary parks in the program of the pan-European association EUROPARC Federation. The KRNAP administration is also a member of another international organization EuroSite and a co-founder of the free association of protected areas on the Elbe Elbe Parks.

The Krkonoše National Park is classified in the IUCN categorization as Protected Landscape, i.e. category V. It does not meet the international criteria for a national park (IUCN II). The care of the park and the administrative arrangements for activities are provided by the Krkonoše National Park Administration, based in Vrchlabí.

== Nature ==
The nature of the Giant Mountains is very diverse - the geological subsoil, its dynamic development in the past, the influence of the cold climate and the subsequent warming resulted in the creation of diverse biotopes and the preservation of rare species of both plants and animals for our nature. There are about 300 species of vertebrates and over 1200 species of vascular plants and several times more spore plants (such as mosses, slime molds, ferns, lichens). Several endemics occur in the Krkonoše nature.

=== Geomorphological conditions ===
Krkonoše National Park lies primarily within the Giant Mountains, part of the Sudetes mountain system. The park's highest point, Sněžka (1,603 metres above sea level), is also the highest peak in the Czech Republic. The effects of the last glaciation are evident throughout the park, with features such as cirques, glacial valleys, moraines, tors, stone seas, and other glacial relics.

Additionally, karst phenomena are present in the eastern part of the park, particularly around Albeřice, where the Albeřice quarries are located.

=== Geological conditions ===
The geological subsoil of the Krkonoše national park is highly diverse. Most of the area falls within the so-called Krkonoše-Jizera crystalline complex, a significant part of which—the Krkonoše-Jizera pluton, composed primarily of granitoids—extends into the national park. This formation shapes the main ridge, stretching from Mrtvý vrch (1,060 m) to the western foothills of Sněžka (1,603 m).

In the contact zone, which extends from Hvězda (959 m) through Čertova hora (1,210 m) to Svorová hora (1,411 m), the dominant rock types are gray schist and phyllites. The eastern part of the region consists mainly of Krkonoše gneisses and phyllites, while the western part is primarily composed of phyllites of the Ponikel group.

Additionally, the sub-Krkonoše basin extends into the Krkonoše National Park, containing sedimentary rocks dating from the Carboniferous to the Permian period.

=== Climate ===
Mountainous areas in Central Europe are characterized by distinct seasonal changes and the influence of the Atlantic Ocean, resulting in highly variable weather. The orientation of slopes to sunlight and wind flow are crucial factors influencing microclimatic conditions, which in turn affect the vegetation in these areas. In the Giant Mountains, temperature inversions frequently occur during the winter and autumn months, sometimes lasting for several weeks. The average annual temperature varies, with 0.2 °C recorded on Sněžka, while lower-altitude locations experience higher averages (e.g., 3.9 °C in Dolní Malá Úpa, 4.7 °C in Bedřichov). July is the warmest month, and January is the coldest. Snow cover on mountain peaks lasts for up to 180 days.

=== Flora and vegetation stages ===
The alpine forest boundary in the Krkonoše national ranges from 1,250 to 1,350 metres above sea level. Several species found at high altitudes are glacial relicts—plants that have survived since the last glaciation. These include the Giant Mountain lousewort, snow saxifrage, cloudberry, Lindberg's sphagnum, and others.

The Giant Mountains are divided into the following vegetation stages:

==== Submontane (400–800 m above sea level) ====
In the submontane zone, deciduous and mixed forests originally predominated, consisting of beech, sycamore, rowan, grey alder, and on the Polish side, European larch. However, these native forests were largely logged and replaced with artificial spruce monocultures.

The undergrowth includes protected plant species such as bulbous corydalis and hollow corydalis, buttercup anemone, wood anemone, wild garlic, and the golden lily.

==== Montane (800–1,200 m above sea level) ====
In the montane zone, spruce forests dominate, both natural and artificially planted. These dark forests provide a suitable habitat for ferns, such as male fern, mountain ribwort, and lady fern.

Since the 18th century, treeless mountain meadows have formed, harboring rare plants such as the Bohemian bellflower, Sudeten yellow violet, arnica, white-flowered hogweed, and various orchids.

==== Subalpine (1,200–1,450 m above sea level) ====
The subalpine zone contains some of the most ecologically valuable habitats in the Giant Mountains. These include immortelle meadows, northern peat bogs, and low-growing heathlands, where glacial relict plants still thrive. The herbaceous layer consists of species such as stiff-leaved immortelle, hairy reed grass, bog cranberry, and others.

==== Alpine (1,450–1,603 m above sea level) ====
The highest elevations belong to the alpine zone, where steep rocky slopes and glacial cirques (often called Krkonoše botanical gardens) support the richest plant diversity. Among the notable species found on the rocky slopes are alpine milk-vetch, mountain garlic, and various ferns. In spring-fed areas, species such as mountain chives, lesser primrose, alpine clematis, and perennial crocus thrive. Although woody plants struggle to grow due to the extreme conditions, low-growing species such as Silesian willow, Carpathian birch, alpine rockrose, Sudeten rowan, and Dwarf mountain pine can be found.

== Fauna ==
The diverse animal species found in the Giant Mountains are closely linked to its rich plant communities. The region's animal communities were shaped during the last ice age and the subsequent warmer Holocene period.

At lower altitudes, species of the Euro-Siberian fauna dominate, while at higher elevations, mountain species become more prevalent. Several invertebrates in the region are considered glacial relicts, including:

- Spiny-footed minnow (Pungitius pungitius)
- Northern plait beetle
- Mountain mayfly (Baetis alpinus)
- Ground beetle (Nebria gyllenhali)
- Dragonflies such as Somatochlora alpestris and Aeshna coerulea

Among vertebrates, notable species include:

- Ring ouzel (Turdus torquatus), a high-altitude thrush
- Bluethroat (Luscinia svecica), a bird associated with tundra-like habitats
- Eurasian dotterel (Charadrius morinellus), a rare plover found in alpine meadows
- Dipper (Cinclus cinclus), a bird adapted to fast-flowing mountain streams
- The most widespread rodent' in the region, the water vole (Arvicola amphibius)

The Giant Mountains are home to a few endemic species, meaning they are found nowhere else in the world. These include:

- Krkonoše mayfly (Rhithrogena corcontica)
- Sudeten yellow-banded carpet moth (Torula quadriaria sudetica; unique regional variant)
- Krkonoše spindle snail (Cochlodina dubiosa corcontica; unique regional variant)

== Tourism ==
The Giant Mountains are the highest and most visited Czech mountains. Traditional excursion destinations include Sněžka, the source of the Elbe, the Pančava, Elbe and Mumlava waterfalls, the nature trail through the Černohorské rašeliniště peat bog, the Obří důl valley, the ancient forest of Dvorský les and the mountain hut Luční bouda. Tourists' destinations include, for example, the Štěpánka lookout tower on the border of the Giant Mountains and the Jizera Mountains.

A record number of tourists visited the Krkonoše National Park in 2022. The park recorded more than 12.1 million visits, which is 250,000 more than in the previous record year of 2018. This is based on anonymized data on the movement of users of mobile operator services and data from automatic counters on the border of the Krkonoše National Park's rest areas.

Mass tourism also brings negative consequences. According to the park management, tourists often leave a lot of garbage on site, the removal of which is very expensive. Tourists often violate the park rules and enter quiet areas outside the marked paths. In some areas of the park, for example at the top of Sněžka, additional barriers have been placed to prevent unauthorized entry of unruly visitors outside the official movement routes.

== 2025 ==
In March 2025 Krkonoše National Park has initiated a project to restore the European silver fir (Abies alba) population, which has declined to a mere 0.46% of the forest composition due to factors like soil acidification, air pollution, climate change, and pests. Historically, silver firs constituted about 15% of the region's forests. The restoration effort involves collecting grafts from selected healthy silver firs, with over 1,500 grafts harvested from 50 trees at higher altitudes. These grafts will be cultivated into seedlings to establish a seed orchard, aiming to increase the silver fir population to approximately 1.5% in the near future. The first seedlings are expected to be planted back into the wild in three years, but the project's long-term success will span several decades, reflecting the slow growth nature of forest ecosystems.
