= Pančava Waterfall =

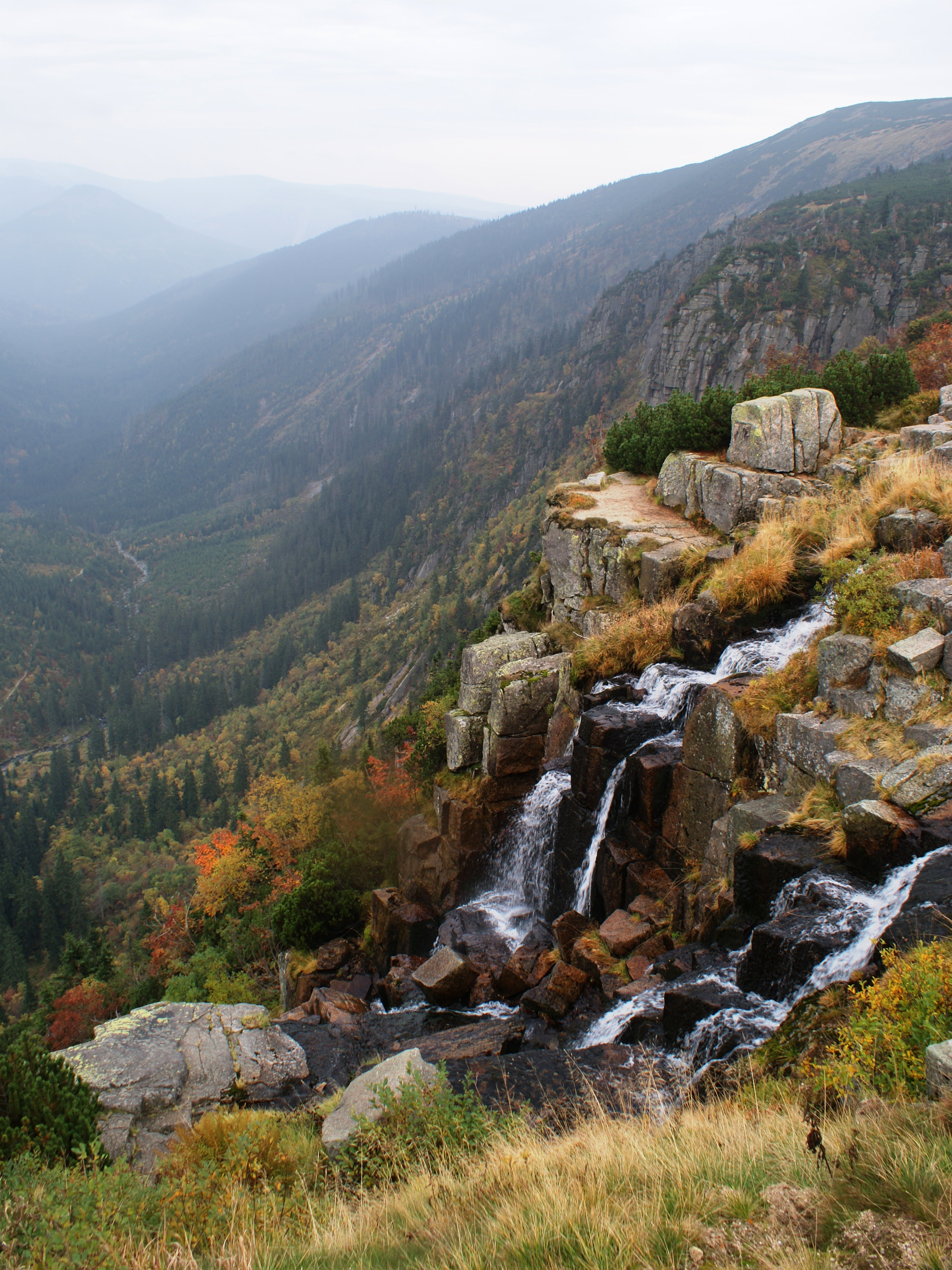
- General view of the waterfall
- Interactive map of Pančava Waterfall
- Location: Špindlerův Mlýn, Czech Republic
- Coordinates: 50°45′40″N 15°32′43″E
- Type: Horsetail
- Elevation: 1,298 m (4,259 ft)
- Total height: 148 m (486 ft)
- Watercourse: Pančava
- Average flow rate: 0.03 m^{3}/s (1.1 cu ft/s)

Pančava Waterfall or Pančavský Waterfall (Czech: Pančavský vodopád) is the highest waterfall in the Czech Republic, boasting a total height of 148 metres (486 ft). It is situated in the municipal territory of Špindlerův Mlýn in the Hradec Králové Region, in the Giant Mountains within the Krkonoše National Park. It cascades from the Pančavská louka Meadow into the Labský důl Valley.

== Water flow ==
The Pančava Waterfall is formed by the Pančava stream, a right tributary of the Elbe River. It has a constant flow with fluctuations, averaging 25 litres per second. The waterfall is most abundant during the spring snowmelt, typically occurring from late April to early May.

During high water levels, the waterfall splits into multiple streams, creating a branched cascade. As it flows into the hillside scree, it does not form a boiling point at the base, which is common in many waterfalls.

== Name ==
The name Pančava comes from the Pančavský stream, which is derived from the German word pantschen, meaning 'to splash'. In literary terms, it is related to planschen or plantschen, both meaning 'to splash' or 'to spray water'.

== Natural conditions ==
Morphologically, Pančava Waterfall is classified as a false, multi-stage, and multi-branch waterfall. From a genetic standpoint, it is characterized as natural, consistent, and karstic. The geological bedrock consists of granite.

The waterfall has a total height of 148 metres (486 ft), cascading from an altitude of 1,298 metres (4,259 ft) down to 1,150 metres (3,770 ft). During spring snowmelt, the waterfall extends to 162 metres (531 ft) due to the formation of a southern branch in the lower section.

The total slope of the waterfall reaches 44 °C (111 °F). It features four prominent stages, with heights (from the top) between 20 and 39 m (66 and 128 ft). The width varies between 1 and 20 m (3 ft 3 in and 65 ft 7 in), but typically ranges between 4 and 8 m (13 and 26 ft).

== History of tourism ==
The Pančava Waterfall has been a popular tourist attraction since the early days of tourism. In 1859, Josef Schier, the owner of the nearby mountain hut Labská bouda, constructed a small water reservoir with a sluice gate above the upper edge of the waterfall. When a sufficient number of paying tourists arrived, the sluice gate was opened, causing a sudden increase in the waterfall's flow.

To enhance the visitor experience, small refreshment booths and an upper viewing terrace were built above and below the waterfall. However, in the 1930s, the reservoir, booths, and terrace were closed.
