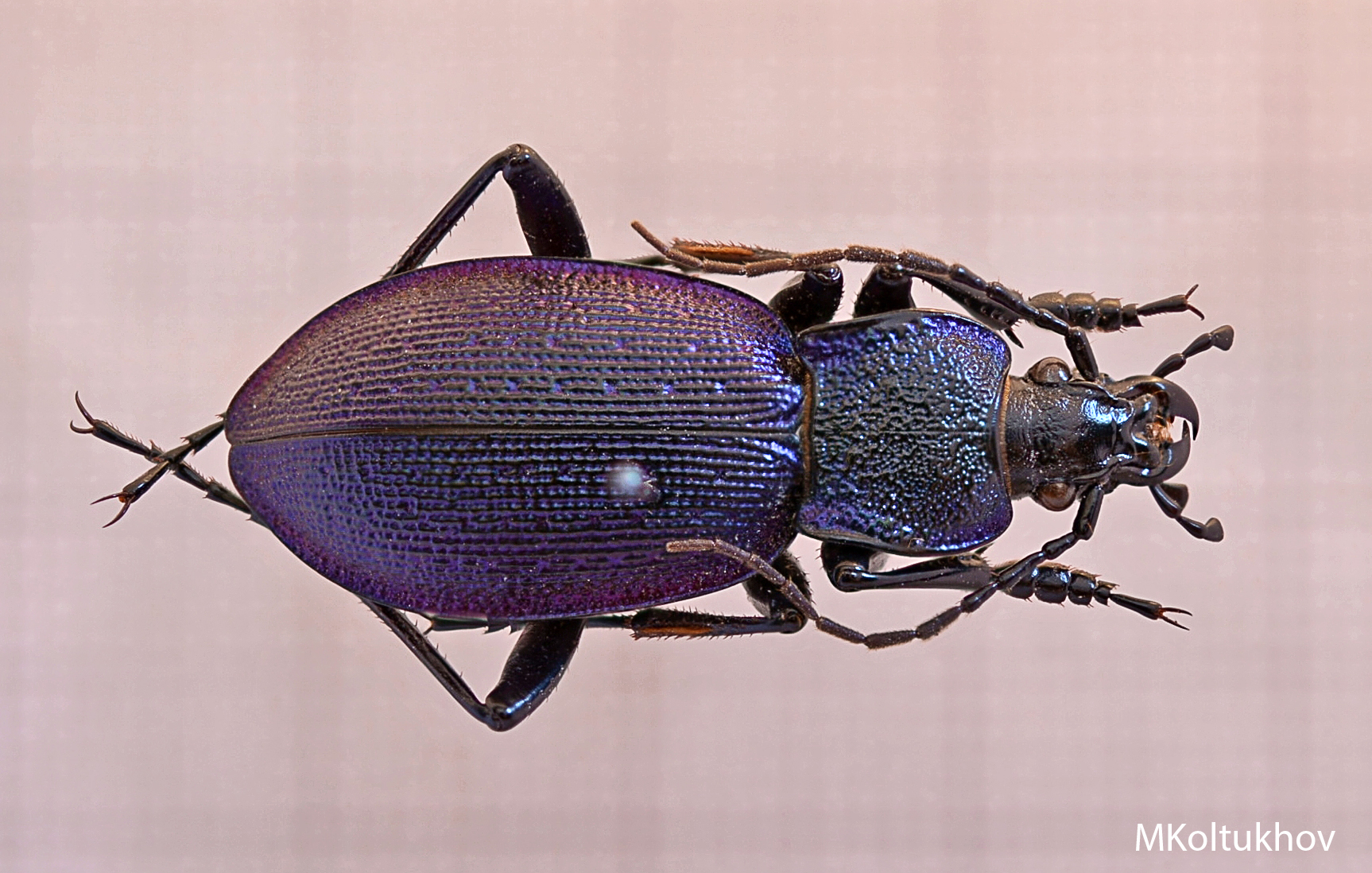

Scientific classification
- Domain: Eukaryota
- Kingdom: Animalia
- Phylum: Arthropoda
- Class: Insecta
- Order: Coleoptera
- Suborder: Adephaga
- Family: Carabidae
- Genus: Carabus
- Species: C. gyllenhali

Binomial name
- Carabus gyllenhali Fischer, 1827

= Carabus gyllenhali =

Species of beetle

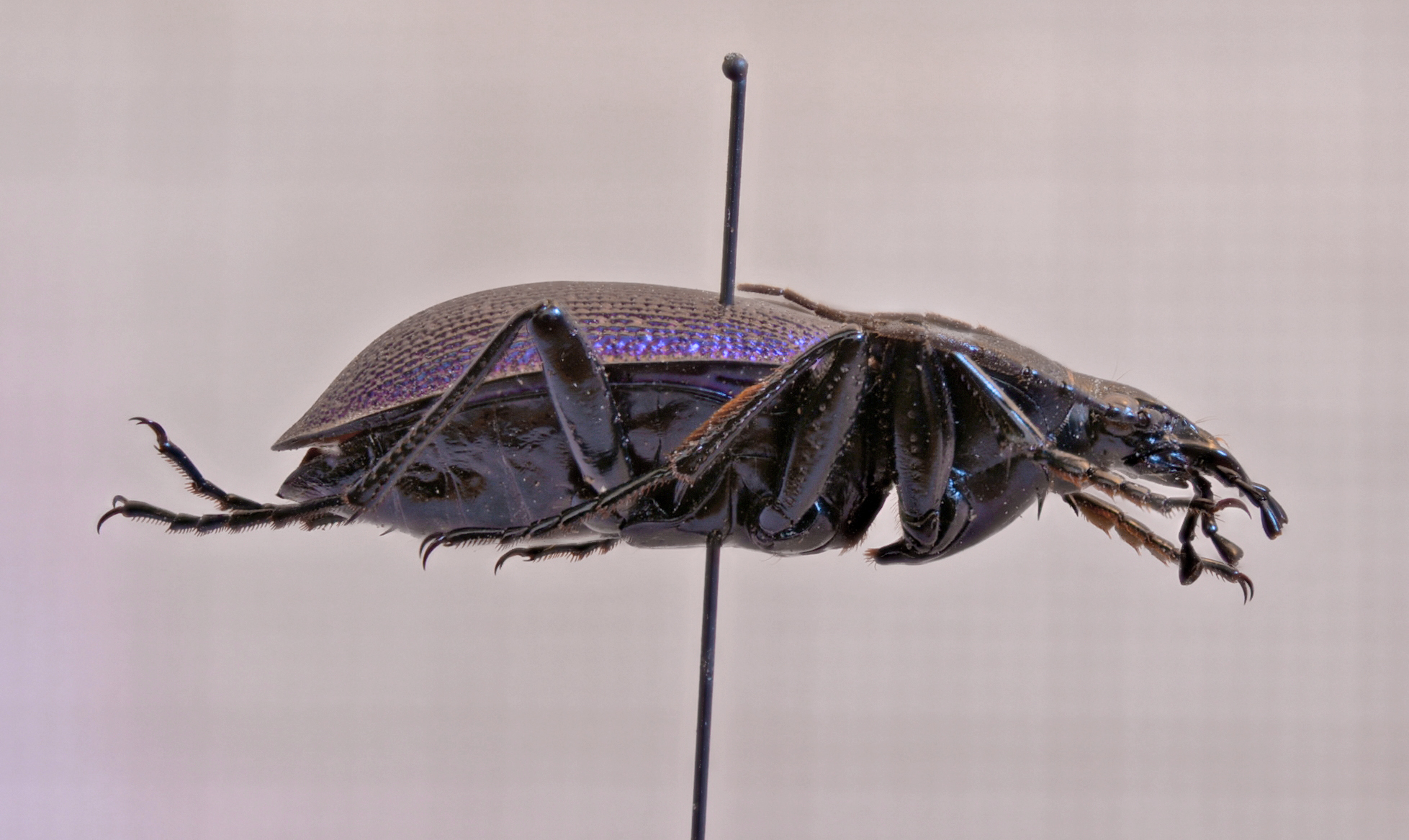

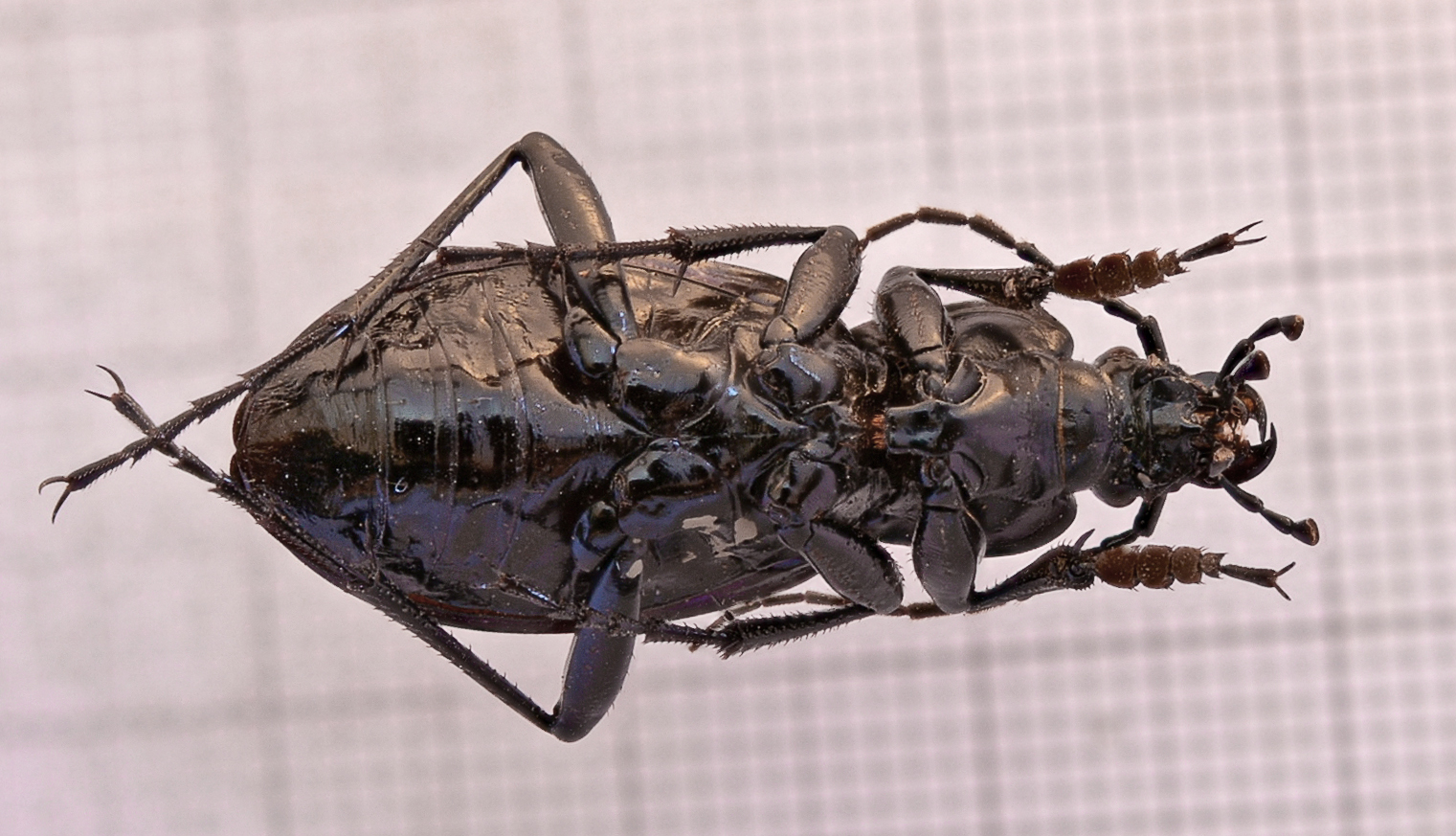

Carabus gyllenhali is a species of ground beetle from Carabinae family that is endemic to Ukraine./Russia
