= Vrchlabí =

- Town
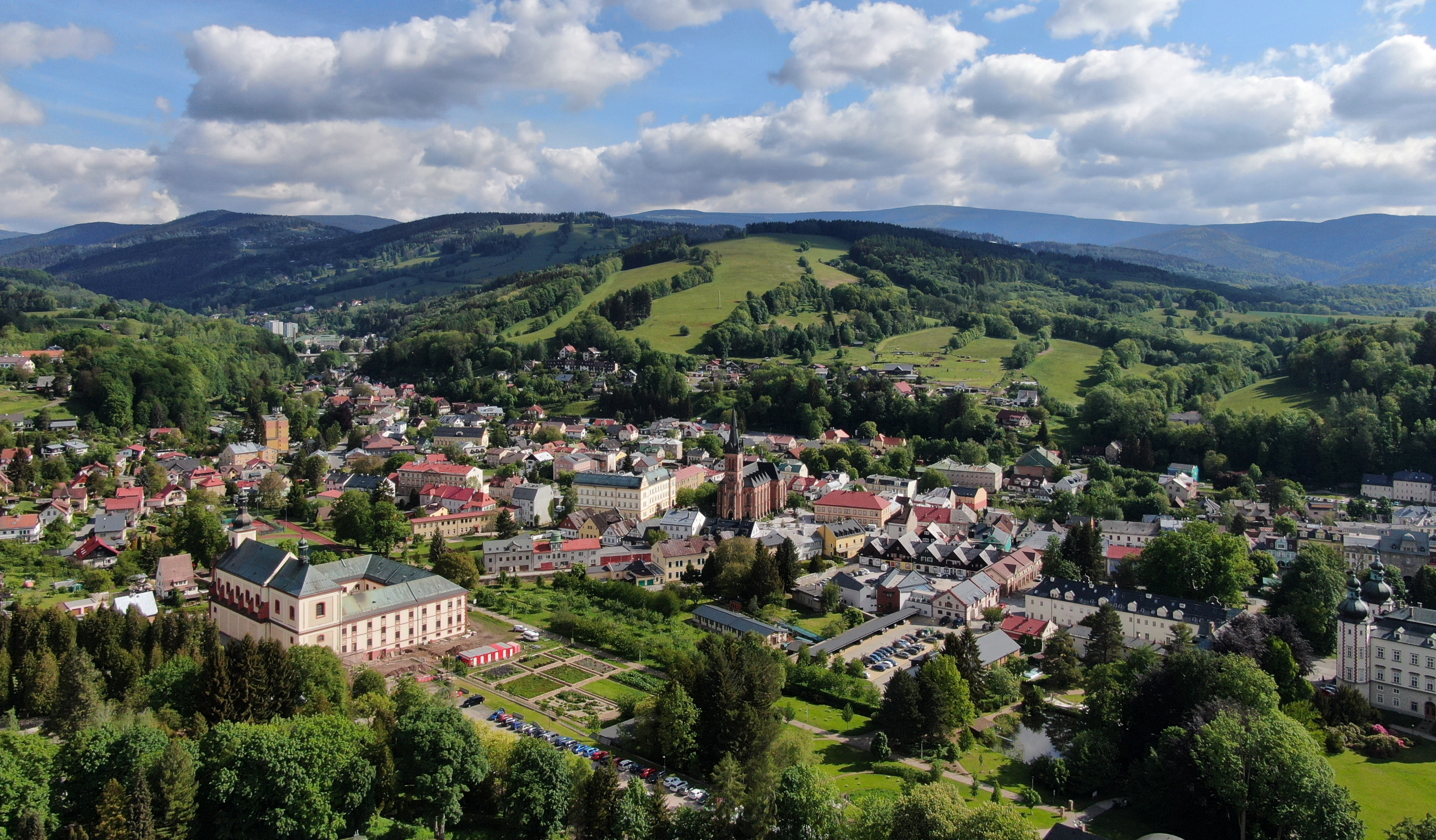
- Aerial view with the Vrchlabí Castle on the left

- Flag Coat of arms

- Location in the Czech Republic
- Coordinates: 50°37′40″N 15°36′37″E
- Country: Czech Republic
- Region: Hradec Králové
- District: Trutnov
- First mentioned: 1359

Government
  - Mayor: Jan Sobotka

Area
  - Total: 27.65 km^{2} (10.68 sq mi)
- Elevation: 477 m (1,565 ft)

Population (2026-01-01)
  - Total: 12,028
  - Density: 435.0/km^{2} (1,127/sq mi)
- Time zone: UTC+1 (CET)
  - Summer (DST): UTC+2 (CEST)
- Postal code: 543 01
- Website: www.muvrchlabi.cz

Vrchlabí (Czech pronunciation: [ˈvr̩xlabiː]; German: Hohenelbe) is a town in Trutnov District in the Hradec Králové Region of the Czech Republic. It has about 12,000 inhabitants. The town is located on the Elbe River at the foot of the Giant Mountains and is known as a centre of tourism and winter sports. Industry in the town is represented by a Škoda Auto factory.

The main landmarks of Vrchlabí are the Vrchlabí Castle and Church of Saint Lawrence. The town centre with the castle complex, monastery complex and town park is well preserved and is protected as an urban monument zone.

== Administrative division ==
Vrchlabí consists of three municipal parts (in brackets population according to the 2021 census):

- Vrchlabí (9,008)
- Hořejší Vrchlabí (1,236)
- Podhůří (1,684)

== Etymology ==
The name of the town is closely related with the location on the Elbe River. The oldest name of Vrchlabí is Latin Albipolis (Albi = 'Elbe', polis = 'city'). Both the Czech and German names can be translated as 'upper Elbe area'.

== Geography ==
Vrchlabí is located about 21 kilometres (13 mi) northwest of Trutnov and 48 km (30 mi) north of Hradec Králové. About half of the municipal territory lies in the Giant Mountains, and its northern part lies in the Krkonoše National Park. The seat of the administration of the national park is located in Vrchlabí. The southern part of Vrchlabí lies in the Giant Mountains Foothills. The town is nicknamed the "Gateway to the Giant Mountains". The highest point is on the slopes of the mountain Žalý with an altitude of 1,028 metres (3,373 ft), however both Žalý's peaks lies behind the border of Vrchlabí.

Vrchlabí is located on the upper course of the Elbe River. There are two small fishponds in the territory of Vrchlabí. The larger one is Vejsplachy, used for recreational purposes. The pond Vrchlabský rybník, named after the town, lies outside the municipal territory.

=== Climate ===
Vrchlabí's climate is classified as humid continental climate (Köppen: Dfb; Trewartha: Dcbo). Among them, the annual average temperature is 8.3 °C (46.9 °F), the hottest month in July is 18.1 °C (64.6 °F), and the coldest month is −2.1 °C (28.2 °F) in January. The annual precipitation is 868.8 millimetres (34.20 in), of which July is the wettest with 97.1 millimetres (3.82 in), while April is the driest with only 35.3 millimetres (1.39 in). The extreme temperature throughout the year ranged from −25.6 °C (−14.1 °F) on 3 February 2012 to 35.2 °C (95.4 °F) on 7 August 2015.

Climate data for Vrchlabí, 1991–2020 normals, extremes 1898–present
Month	Jan	Feb	Mar	Apr	May	Jun	Jul	Aug	Sep	Oct	Nov	Dec	Year
Record high °C (°F)	12.3 (54.1)	15.1 (59.2)	20.9 (69.6)	26.9 (80.4)	29.8 (85.6)	33.7 (92.7)	34.7 (94.5)	35.2 (95.4)	31.1 (88.0)	25.7 (78.3)	17.6 (63.7)	10.6 (51.1)	35.2 (95.4)
Mean daily maximum °C (°F)	0.7 (33.3)	3.0 (37.4)	7.8 (46.0)	14.4 (57.9)	18.2 (64.8)	22.1 (71.8)	24.1 (75.4)	23.9 (75.0)	18.8 (65.8)	12.4 (54.3)	7.1 (44.8)	2.2 (36.0)	12.9 (55.2)
Daily mean °C (°F)	−2.1 (28.2)	−0.7 (30.7)	2.9 (37.2)	8.8 (47.8)	12.8 (55.0)	16.6 (61.9)	18.1 (64.6)	17.7 (63.9)	13.0 (55.4)	8.1 (46.6)	4.3 (39.7)	−0.2 (31.6)	8.3 (46.9)
Mean daily minimum °C (°F)	−5.1 (22.8)	−4.0 (24.8)	−1.2 (29.8)	3.2 (37.8)	7.1 (44.8)	10.9 (51.6)	12.2 (54.0)	12.0 (53.6)	8.2 (46.8)	4.4 (39.9)	1.6 (34.9)	−2.9 (26.8)	3.9 (39.0)
Record low °C (°F)	−20.4 (−4.7)	−25.6 (−14.1)	−15.5 (4.1)	−7.2 (19.0)	−3.1 (26.4)	1.2 (34.2)	3.9 (39.0)	2.9 (37.2)	−1.3 (29.7)	−5.0 (23.0)	−18.7 (−1.7)	−19.6 (−3.3)	−25.6 (−14.1)
Average precipitation mm (inches)	91.2 (3.59)	64.5 (2.54)	60.7 (2.39)	35.3 (1.39)	57.9 (2.28)	74.4 (2.93)	97.1 (3.82)	84.5 (3.33)	70.4 (2.77)	70.8 (2.79)	88.0 (3.46)	72.4 (2.85)	868.8 (34.20)
Average snowfall cm (inches)	36.5 (14.4)	32.7 (12.9)	14.4 (5.7)	2.0 (0.8)	0.0 (0.0)	0.0 (0.0)	0.0 (0.0)	0.0 (0.0)	0.0 (0.0)	0.5 (0.2)	13.3 (5.2)	33.8 (13.3)	133.0 (52.4)
Average relative humidity (%)	86.2	80.2	73.3	64.9	67.3	67.4	67.2	69.6	75.3	81.5	85.7	87.8	75.5
Mean monthly sunshine hours	41.4	71.8	144.2	186.7	199.8	219.6	228.6	214.7	163.2	103.4	42.8	34.4	1,650.5
Source: Czech Hydrometeorological Institute

== History ==
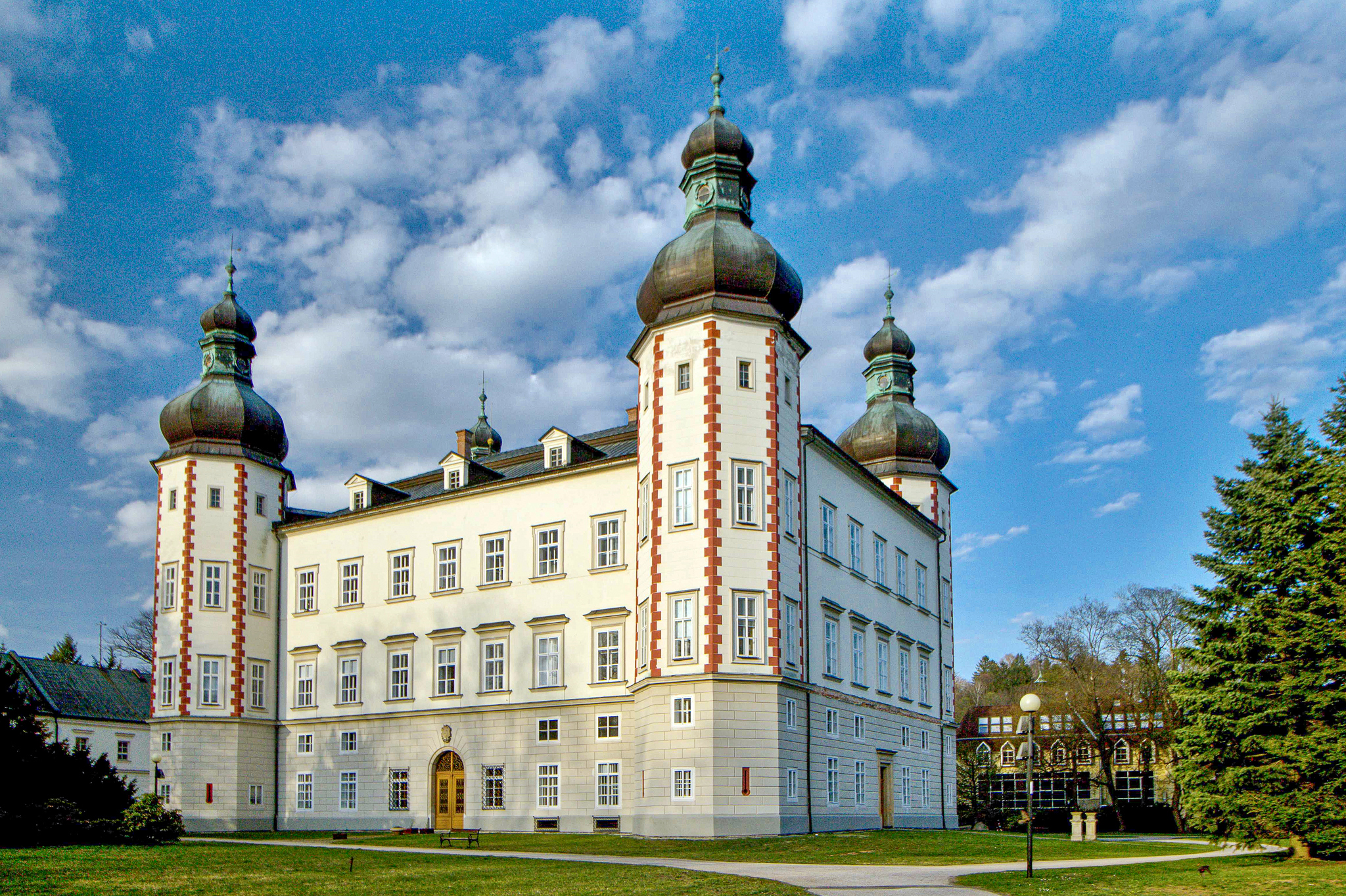
Vrchlabí Castle

=== 14th–16th centuries ===
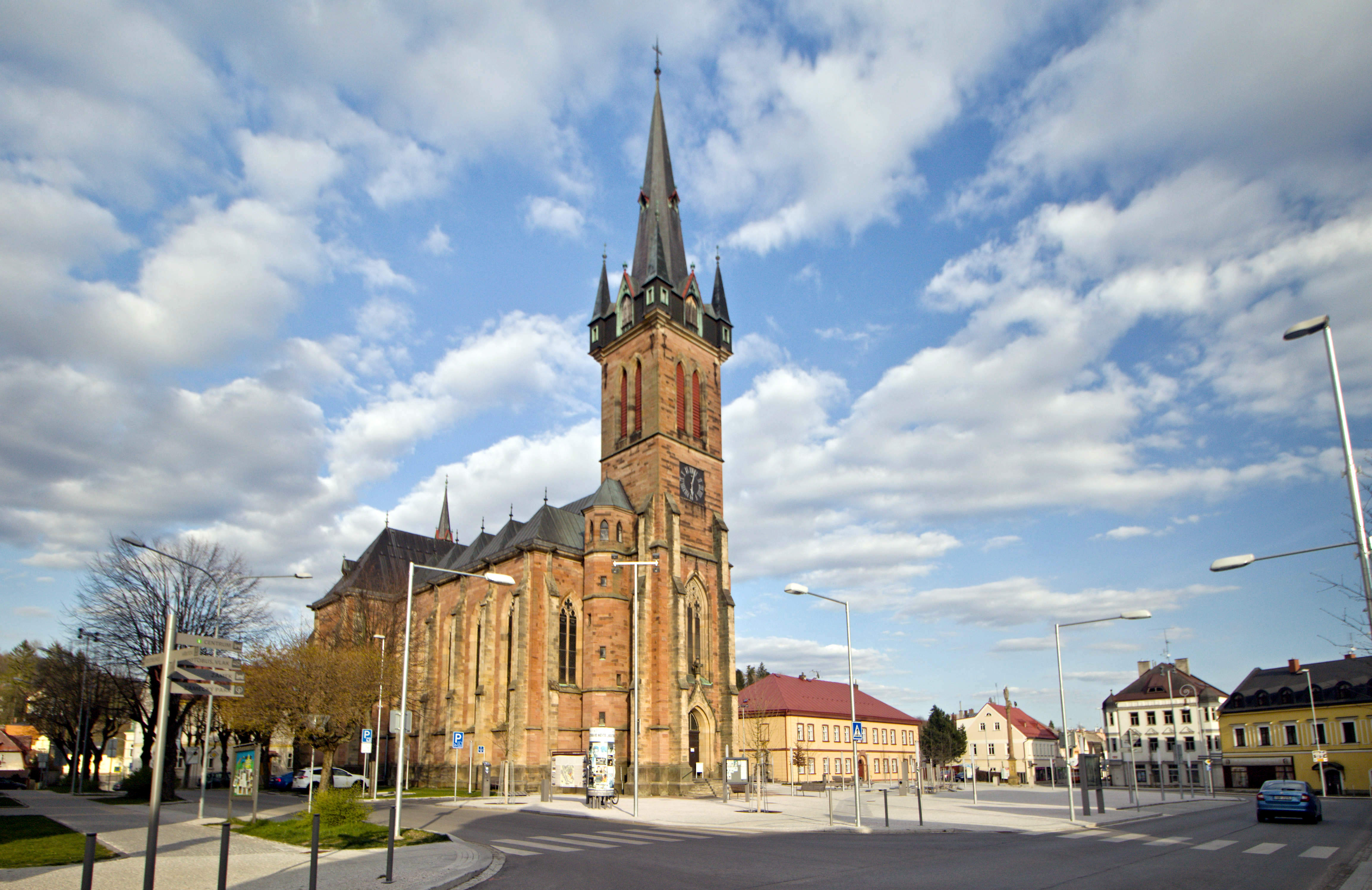
Church of Saint Lawrence

The history of Vrchlabí started with the colonisation of the Giant Mountains. The first settlement called Wrchlab was probably founded before 1300. The first written mention is from 1359.

The most significant person in the history Vrchlabí was Kryštof Gendorf, a mining expert who developed the town into one of the most important metallurgy centres. Thanks to him, Vrchlabí was granted town rights in 1533, along with two annual fairs. Many people from German speaking lands came to work and live to the town during his rule and brought in the Lutheran reformation faith, which spread quickly in the region, supported vividly by Gendorf himself.

In 1561, the estate was acquired by Gendorf's daughter Eustachia. She had three daughters, Barbora, Kateřina and Rozina, among whom the Vrchlabí estate was divided after her death in 1568, but in the end the entire estate was acquired by Rozina and her husband Vilém Miřkovský of Stropčice. At that time, flax weaving became another important industry for Vrchlabí. The weaving guild was founded in Vrchlabí in 1590, at the time of the town's greatest growth. Especially linen cloth was highly desired and it was exported to all over the world, including Italy, Spain, North Africa and overseas.

=== 17th–20th centuries ===
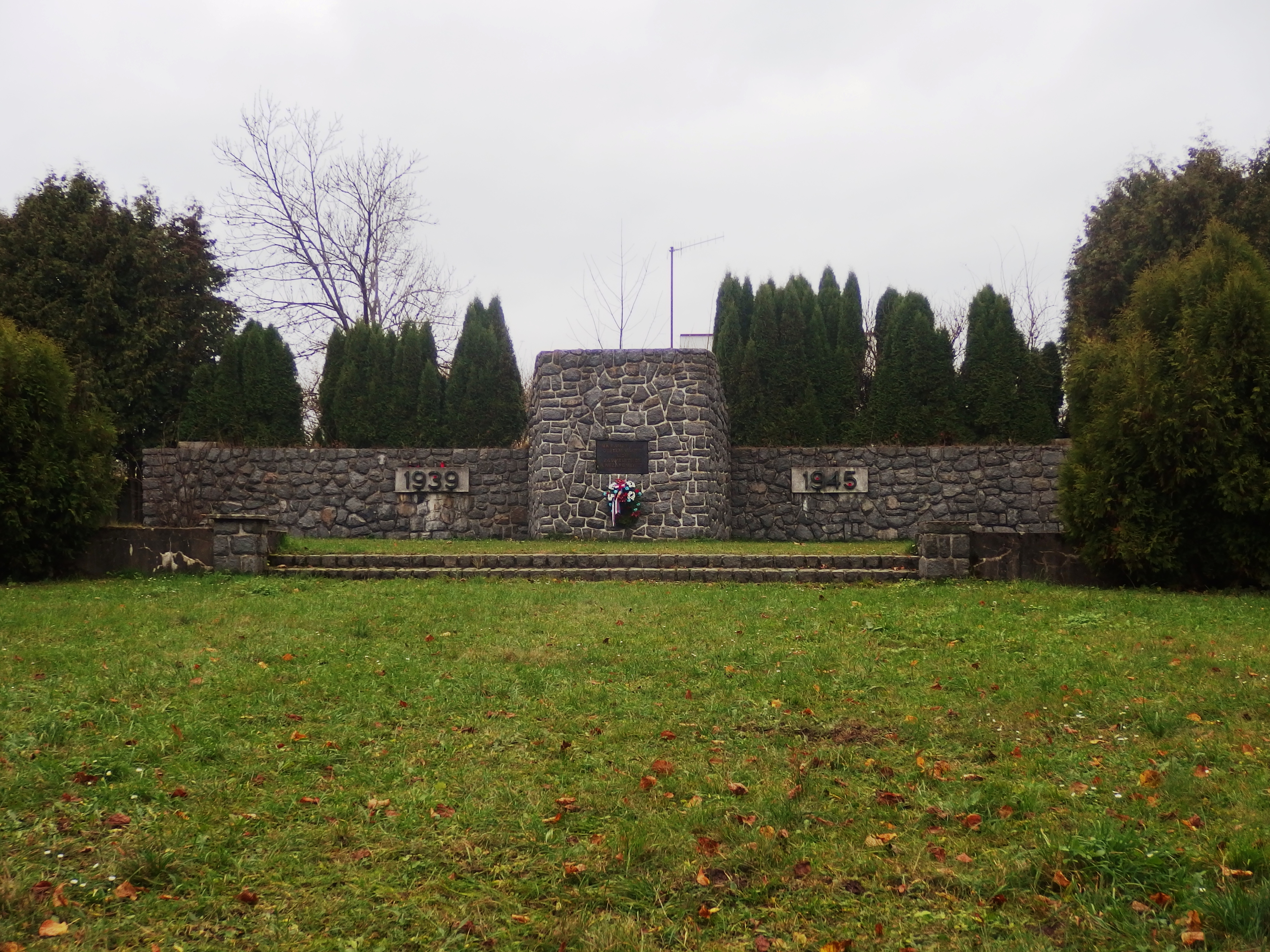
World War II memorial

In 1624, Albrecht von Wallenstein bought the estate from Vilém Miřkovský of Stropčice Jr. During the Thirty Years' War, the smelters in Vrchlabí became an important supplier of weapons. After Wallenstein's death in 1634, Emperor Ferdinand II donated the estate to Rudolf of Morzin. The Counts of Morzin owned Vrchlabí until 1881.

Vrchlabí was known for manufacturing of organs in the 17th and 18th centuries, which was introduced into the town by the Tauchmann family. Textile production dominated the town's economy from the late 18th century until the 1930s and determined the industrial and craft development of Vrchlabí.

In 1867, winter sports started to develop in the region. The main promoter of skiing was Guido Rotter, a local factory owner.

The town was part of the Kingdom of Bohemia, which itself fell to the Habsburg monarchy in the 16th century, and from 1867 to 1918 was included in Austria-Hungary. Administratively it was head of the Hohenelbe District, one of the 94 Bezirkshauptmannschaften in Bohemia.

In 1918, Vrchlabí became part Czechoslovakia, when the Czechs regained independence. From 1938 to 1945 it was occupied by Germany, and was then administered as part of the Reichsgau Sudetenland. During the occupation, the Germans established and operated a Gestapo prison in the town, and a subcamp of the Gross-Rosen concentration camp for female prisoners in the Hořejší Vrchlabí town part. Nazi Germany also brought many Italian, French, English and Russian prisoners of war to work as forced laborers in the town. The town's Germans who had not fled in World War II were expelled according to the Potsdam Agreement and Beneš decrees. The town was restored to Czechoslovakia.

== Demographics ==
Historical population

Year	Pop.	±%
1869	8,115	—
1880	8,191	+0.9%
1890	8,654	+5.7%
1900	9,993	+15.5%
1910	10,993	+10.0%

Year	Pop.	±%
1921	10,209	−7.1%
1930	10,738	+5.2%
1950	9,187	−14.4%
1961	9,969	+8.5%
1970	11,119	+11.5%

Year	Pop.	±%
1980	12,419	+11.7%
1991	13,416	+8.0%
2001	13,171	−1.8%
2011	12,632	−4.1%
2021	11,928	−5.6%

Source: Censuses

== Economy ==
Since the 16th century, Vrchlabí is an industrial town. Nowadays, it is known especially for machinery industry. In Vrchlabí there is one of three factories of Škoda Auto in the Czech Republic. The local branch employs about 1,000 people. From 1946 to 2012, it produced cars, and since 2015, it produces components for cars. The largest employer with its headquarters in the town is ARGO-HYTOS, producer of components and systems for the hydraulic industry.

Vrchlabí is also known as centre of tourism and winter sports, which significantly contribute to the town's economy.

== Transport ==
Vrchlabí is the terminus of a railway line heading from Trutnov.

== Culture ==
The beer festival Krkonošské pivní slavnosti ("Giant Mountains Beer Festival") has been held in the town every year since 1998.

The Střelnice house is the centre of culture. It is a place where all concerts, plays or balls are performed.

== Sport ==
Krakonošova stovka is a 100 km-long march that has been held annually since 1966.

The local ice hockey club, HC Stadion Vrchlabí, plays in the 2nd Czech Republic Hockey League since the 2022–23 season.

The town has a rugby league club called Vrchlabí Mad Squirrels.

There are four ski resorts in the area: Kněžický Vrch, Kněžický Vrch – Kebrlák, Bubákov, and Herlíkovice.

== Sights ==
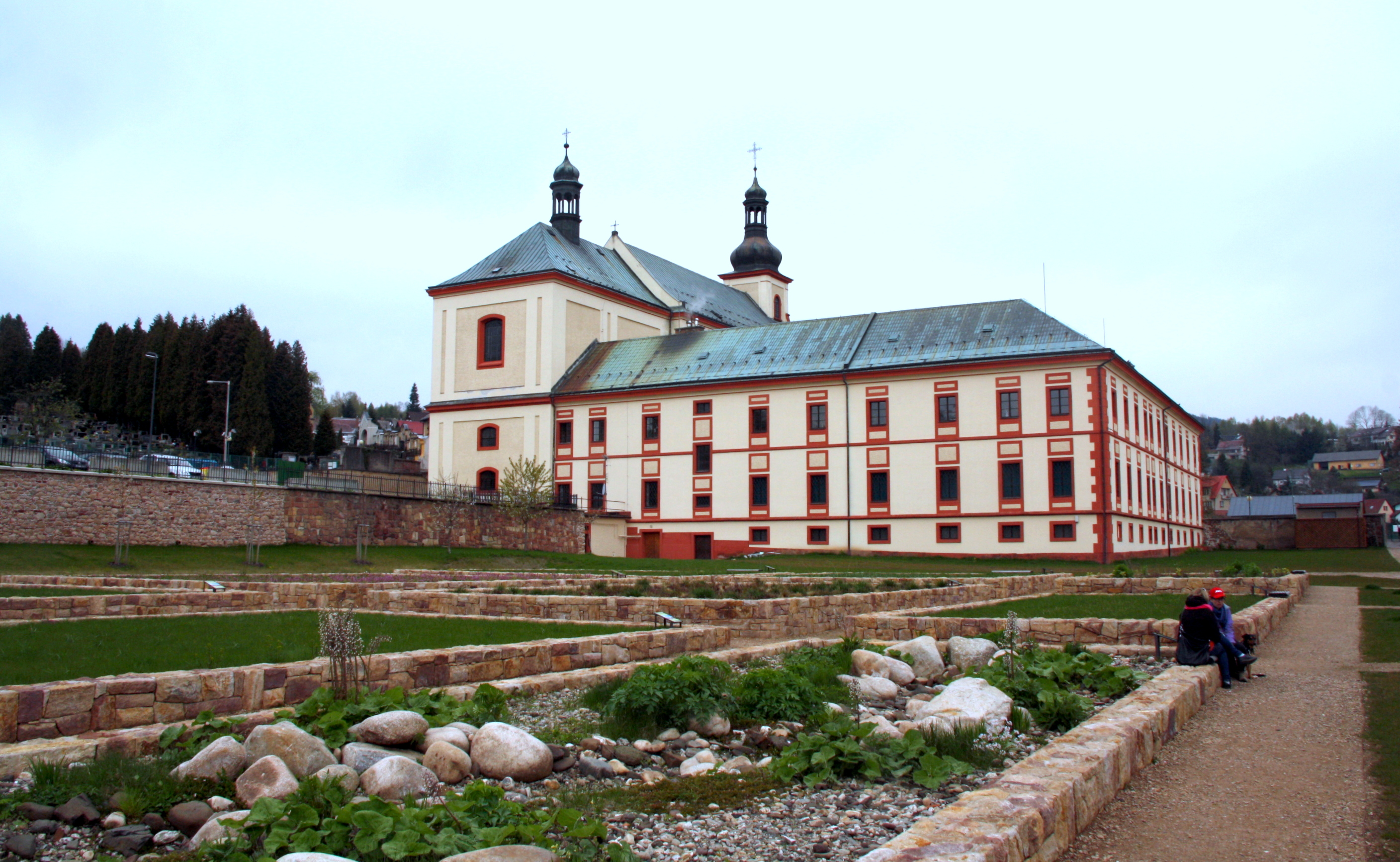
The monastery complex

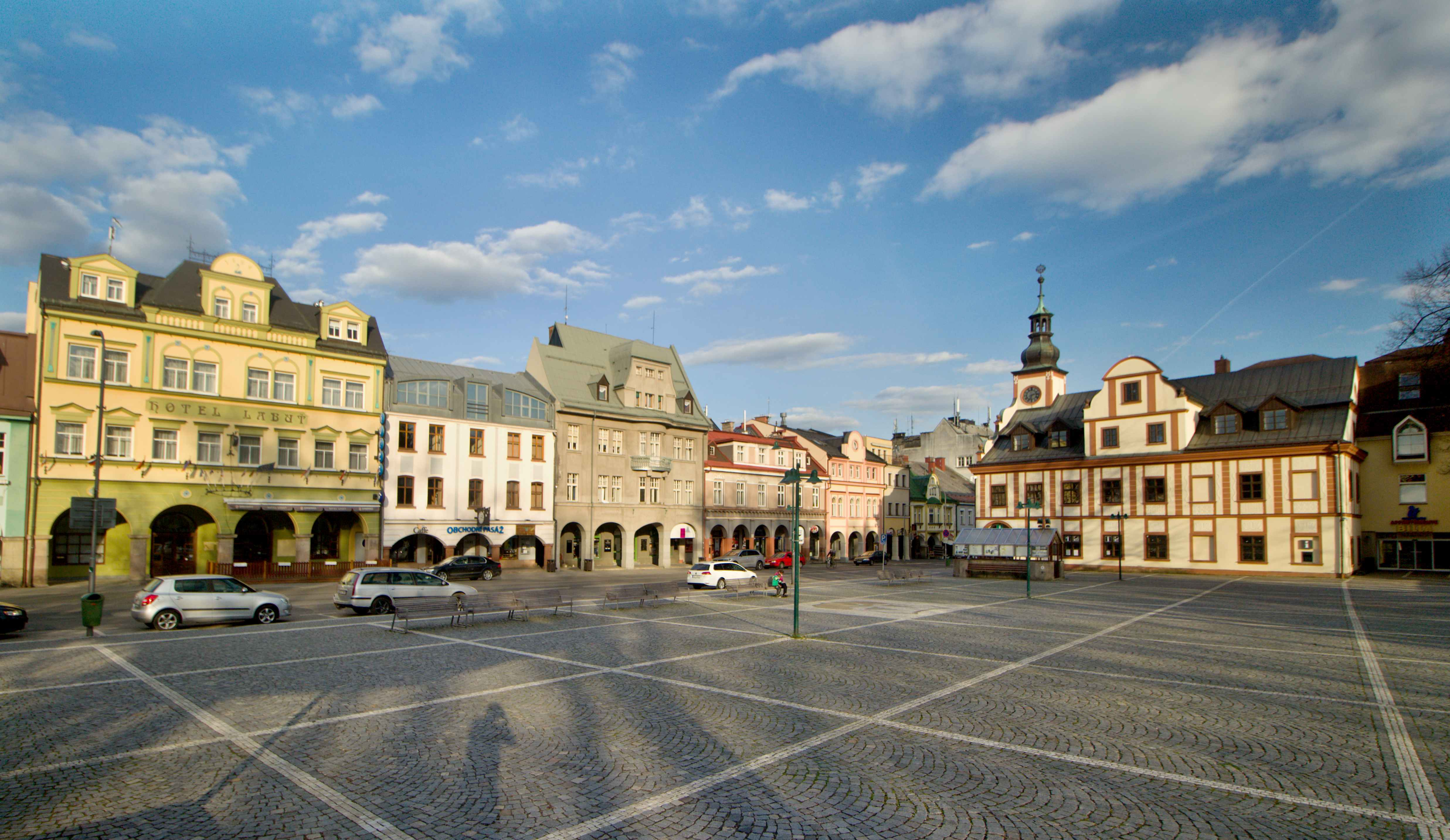
Náměstí T. G. Masaryka with the New Town Hall (right)

The Vrchlabí Castle was built in 1546–1548 for Kryštof Gendorf and originally surrounded by the moat. It was one of the first Renaissance castles in Bohemia. The most valuable monument in the castle and the last piece of the original equipment is the Renaissance faience stove. Nowadays the castle houses the municipal office, and some of the spaces are freely accessible.

The castle is surrounded by a park from the second half of the 19th century. It was originally an ornamental garden, but after the moat was eliminated, the park was redesigned. In the southwestern part of the park is the castle chapel with the Czernin-Morzin tomb. It was built in the neo-Gothic style in 1887–1890.

The monastery of the Discalced Augustinians order was founded in 1705. The monastery complex with the Church of Saint Augustinus was built in the Baroque style with Neoclassical elements and was finished in 1725. Nowadays the premises of the monastery house an exhibition of the Krkonoše Museum on the nature and history of the region, and the church is often used as a concert hall due to its great acoustics.

The Church of Saint Lawrence on the square Náměstí Míru was built in the neo-Gothic style in 1889. It replaced an old Gothic church from the 14th century. It has 60 metres (200 ft)-high tower. Opposite the church is located a valuable set of four gabled houses where is located Krkonoše Museum and KRNAP infocentre. Next to them is one of the oldest monuments in the town, a house which served as the town hall from 1591 to 1737. Above the brick ground floor is the timbered floor supported by four sandstone columns with Ionian heads.

The second square in the historic centre is Náměstí T. G. Masaryka. Its main landmark is the New Town Hall, built in 1732–1737. It was originally built in the Baroque style as one of the first stone buildings in the town. In 1927, it was rebuilt to the neo-Renaissance style.

The very oldest house in Vrchlabí is the House with Seven Gables. It is a modified village chalet with unique appearance.

== Notable people ==
- Josephine Kablik (1787–1863), botanist and paleontologist
- Victor Kugler (1900–1989), Austrian-Dutch war hero
- Anton Joachimsthaler (born 1930), German historian
- Jan Matouš (born 1961), biathlete
- Anna K (born 1965), singer
- Zdeněk Vítek (born 1977), biathlete and coach
- Veronika Vítková (born 1988), biathlete
- Michal Krčmář (born 1991), biathlete
- Karolína Erbanová (born 1992), long-track speed skater
- Eva Samková (born 1993), snowboarder, Olympic champion
- Tereza Voborníková (born 2000), biathlete

== Twin towns – sister cities ==
Vrchlabí is twinned with:

- Baunatal, Germany
- Kowary, Poland
- Trouville-sur-Mer, France
