= Jilemnice =

- Town
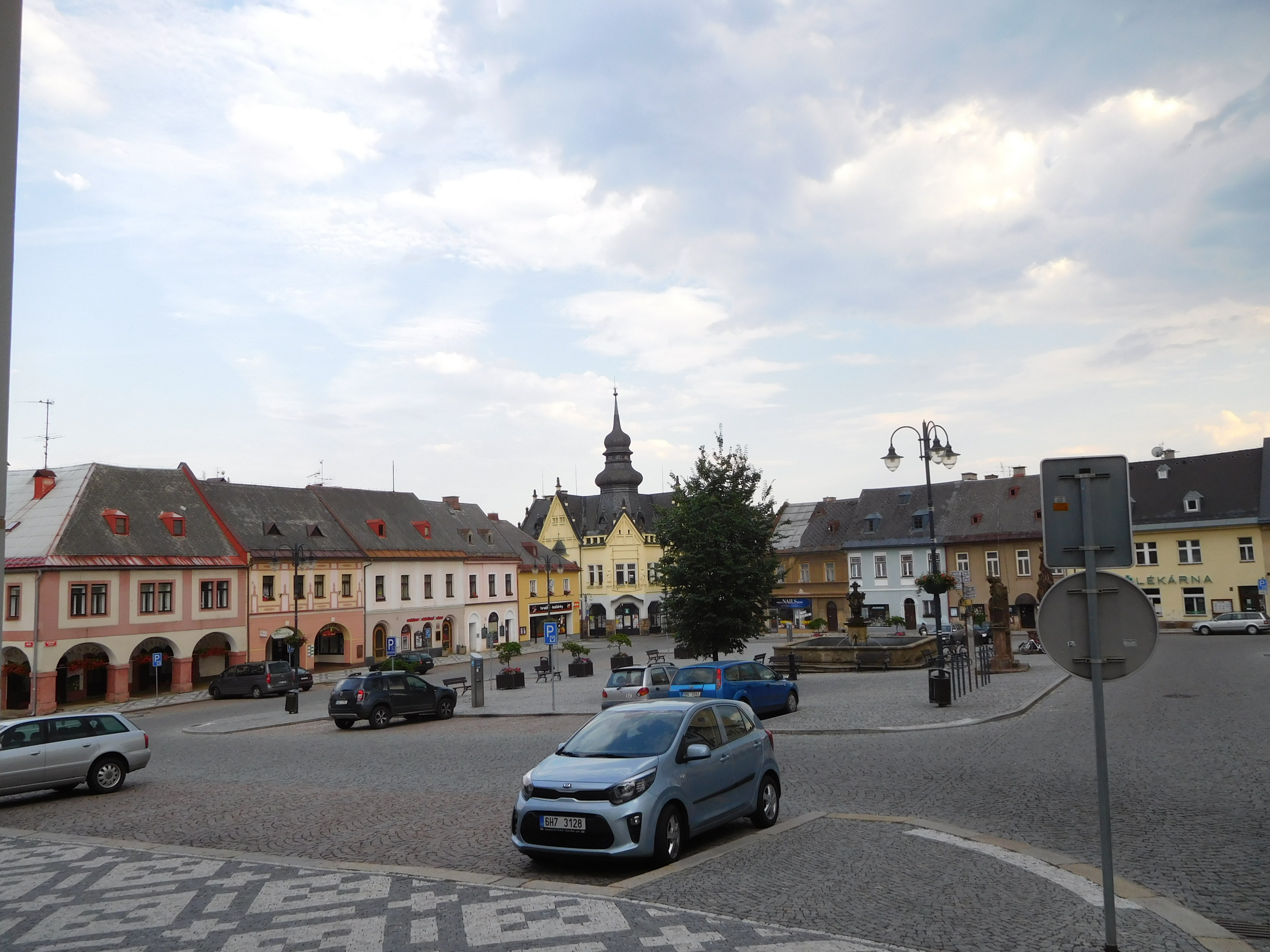
- Masarykovo náměstí, historic centre

- Flag Coat of arms

- Location in the Czech Republic
- Coordinates: 50°36′34″N 15°30′23″E
- Country: Czech Republic
- Region: Liberec
- District: Semily
- First mentioned: 1350

Government
  - Mayor: David Hlaváč

Area
  - Total: 13.86 km^{2} (5.35 sq mi)
- Elevation: 451 m (1,480 ft)

Population (2026-01-01)
  - Total: 5,312
  - Density: 383.3/km^{2} (992.6/sq mi)
- Time zone: UTC+1 (CET)
  - Summer (DST): UTC+2 (CEST)
- Postal code: 514 01
- Website: www.mestojilemnice.cz

Jilemnice (Czech pronunciation: [ˈjɪlɛmɲɪtsɛ]; German: Starkenbach) is a town in Semily District in the Liberec Region of the Czech Republic. It has about 5,400 inhabitants. It is located on the Jilemka Stream in the Giant Mountains Foothills.

Jilemnice was founded in the first half of the 14th century. The main period of development was the 18th century, when the town was owned by the Harrach family. The historic town centre is well preserved and is protected as an urban monument zone. The most important monument is the Jilemnice Castle.

== Administrative division ==
Jilemnice consists of three municipal parts (in brackets population according to the 2021 census):

- Jilemnice (4,526)
- Hrabačov (704)
- Javorek (17)

== Etymology ==
The name was derived from the Czech word jilm ('elm') and from the adjective jilemná (meaning 'flowing between elms'), related to some water course.

== Geography ==
Jilemnice is located about 12 kilometres (7 mi) east of Semily and 34 km (21 mi) southeast of Liberec. It lies in a hilly landscape of the Giant Mountains Foothills. The highest points are the slopes of the Chmelnice hill at 592 m (1,942 ft) above sea level, and the peak of Bubeníkovy vrchy at 588 m (1,929 ft).

The Jizerka River flows through the northern part of the municipal territory. The Jilemka Stream flows through the town into the Jizerka.

== History ==
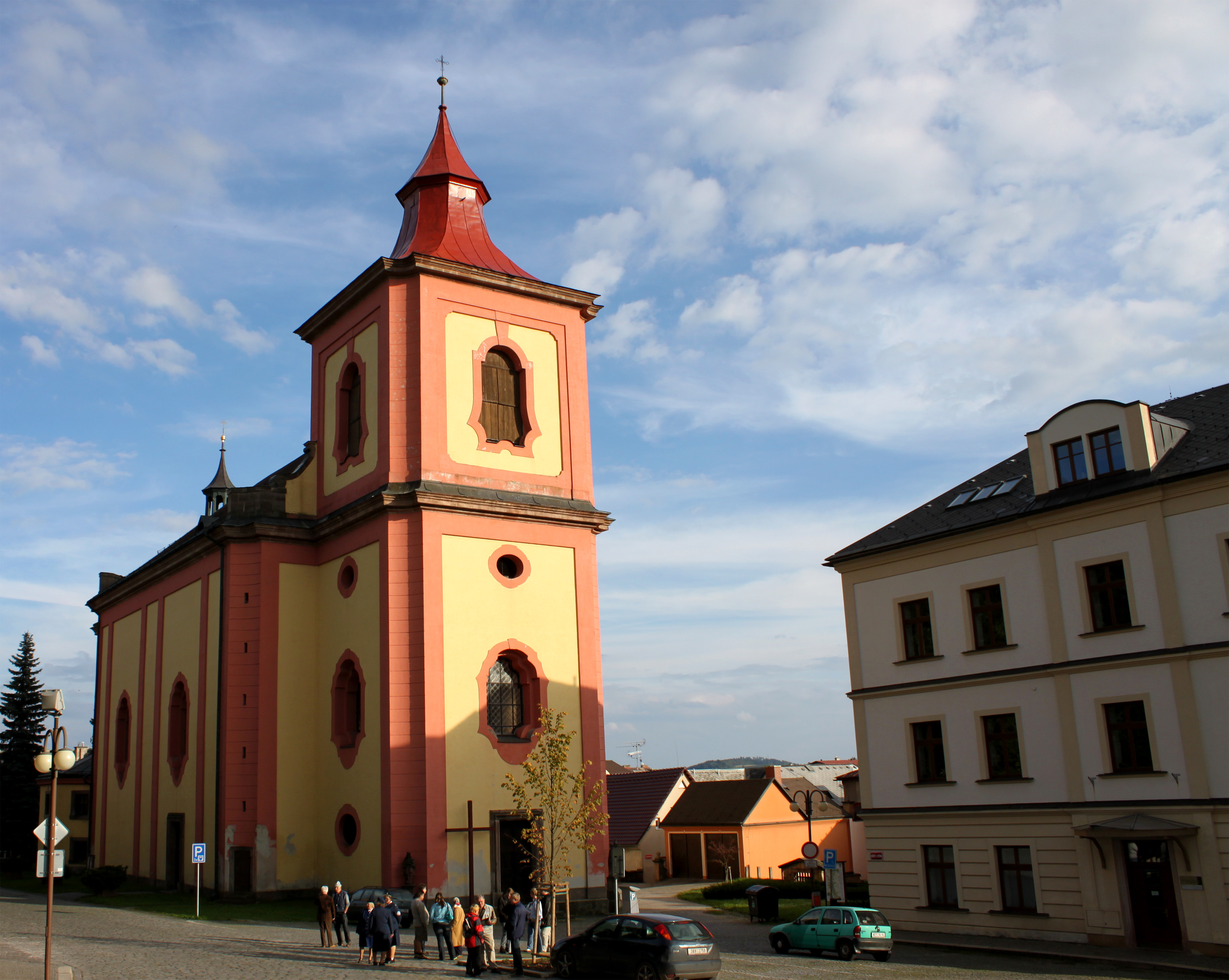
Church of Saint Lawrence

The first written mention of Jilemnice is from 1350. Jilemnice was founded probably in the 1320s as an economic centre of an extensive Štěpanice estate owned by the Waldstein family. The regular ground plan of the historic centre indicates that the town was probably founded on a green field. Because of its secluded location, the town developed in a slower pace than other towns in fertile inland. However, Jilemnice's isolation protected the town against serious war damage for years. The town development was even more restricted from 1492, when the Waldstein family divided the estate into two parts.

In the 15th and 16th centuries, the main economic activities were ore mining and linen production. During the Thirty Years' War, Jilemnice was burned down by the Swedish army and after the war, the town failed to follow up on the previous sources of livelihood.

In 1701, both parts of the estate were acquired and merged by the Harrach family. Since then, Jilemnice began to prosper again. Harrachs' progressive economic policy led to raising of local linen industry to the world level. During the first half of the 19th century, the linen industry gradually declined. In 1873, the Textile Industrial School was founded.

Jilemnice continued to develop in the interwar period and became a tourist resort, but the war had a negative impact on the economy and tourism. After the war, the town's economy shifted to the engineering and food industries.

== Demographics ==
Historical population

Year	Pop.	±%
1869	4,481	—
1880	4,225	−5.7%
1890	4,118	−2.5%
1900	4,353	+5.7%
1910	4,669	+7.3%

Year	Pop.	±%
1921	4,452	−4.6%
1930	4,538	+1.9%
1950	3,991	−12.1%
1961	3,885	−2.7%
1970	4,380	+12.7%

Year	Pop.	±%
1980	5,297	+20.9%
1991	5,829	+10.0%
2001	5,753	−1.3%
2011	5,637	−2.0%
2021	5,247	−6.9%

Source: Censuses

== Economy ==
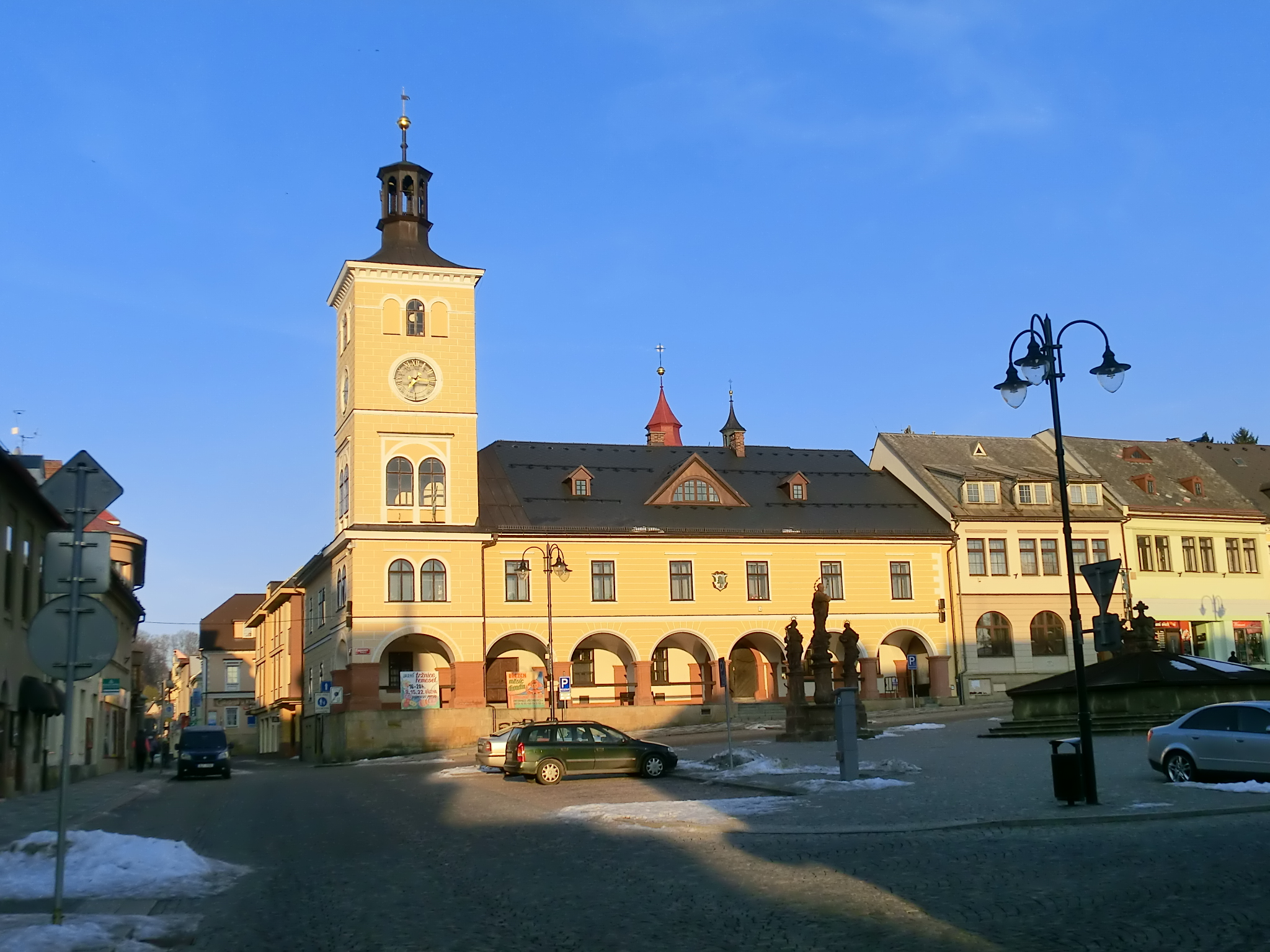
Town hall

The largest industrial employer based in the town is the Czech branch of the Devro company, a manufacturer of collagen casings for food products. From the service sector, the most important employer is the local hospital.

== Transport ==
The I/14 road from Liberec to Trutnov runs through the town.

Jilemnice is located on the railway line Jablonec nad Jizerou–Martinice v Krkonoších.

== Sights ==
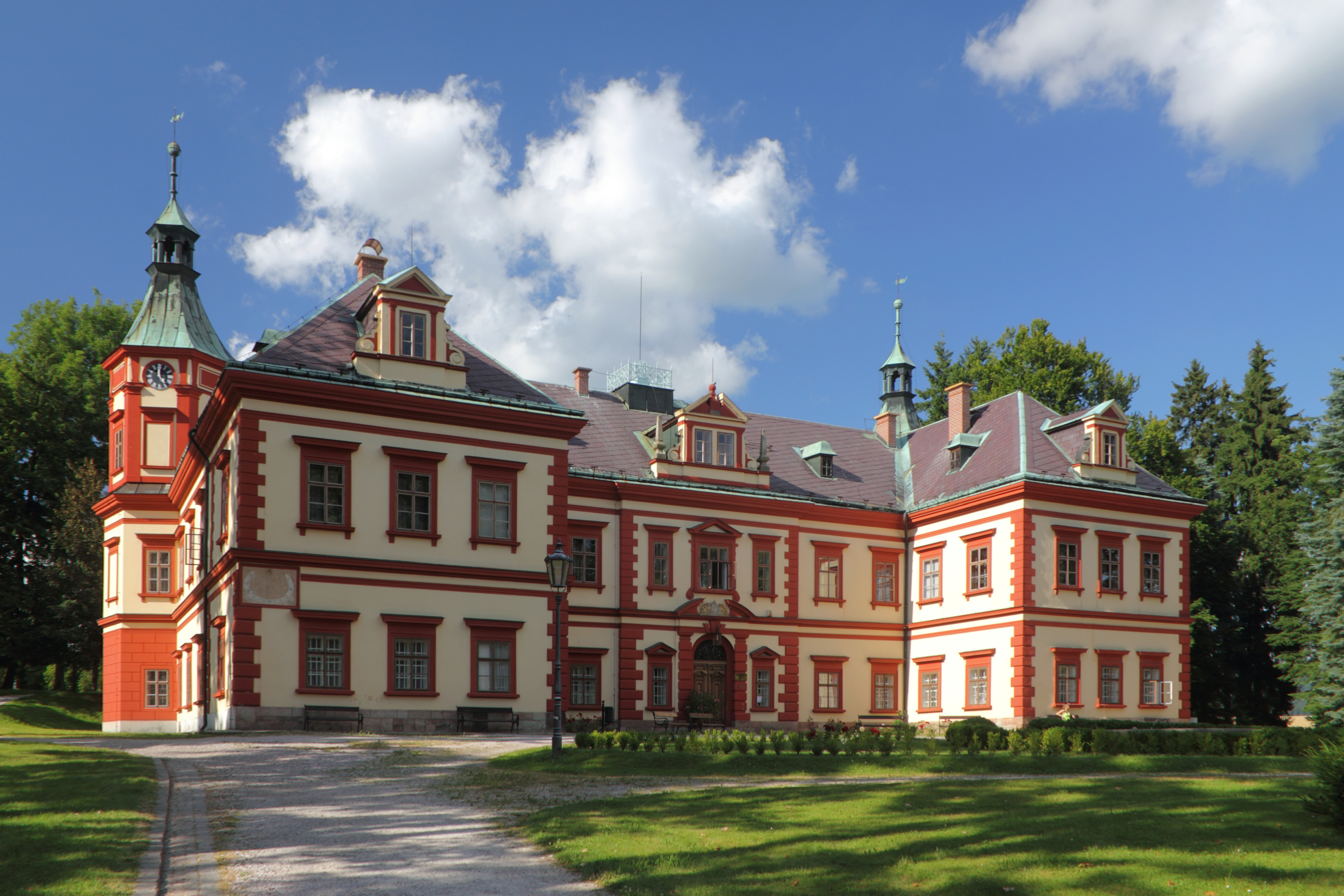
Jilemnice Castle

The main landmark of the town is Jilemnice Castle. It is a Renaissance building from the 16th century, built on the site of a former fortress. Between 1714 and 1895, it was gradually rebuilt into its present form. Today it houses the Giant Mountains Museum.

The Church of Saint Lawrence is one of the most valuable buildings in Jilemnice. The church was built in the Baroque style in 1729–1735.

== Notable people ==
- František Pošepný (1836–1895), geologist
- Jan Weiss (1892–1972), writer
- Jaroslav Havlíček (1896–1943), writer
- Josef Jan Hanuš (1911–1992), World War II pilot
- Martin Kupka (born 1975), politician
- Jakub Hlava (born 1979), ski jumper
- Aleš Vodseďálek (born 1985), Nordic combined skier
- Eva Puskarčíková (born 1991), biathlete

== Twin towns – sister cities ==
Jilemnice is twinned with:

- Świebodzice, Poland
- Świeradów-Zdrój, Poland
