= Labus (disambiguation) =

Labus, Lábus or Labuś is a surname of Slavic origin.

Labus may also refer to:

- Labus (genus), a genus of wasps
- Mount Labus, the place of the Battle of Mount Labus, part of the Seleucid–Parthian Wars
