= Martinice v Krkonoších =

- Municipality
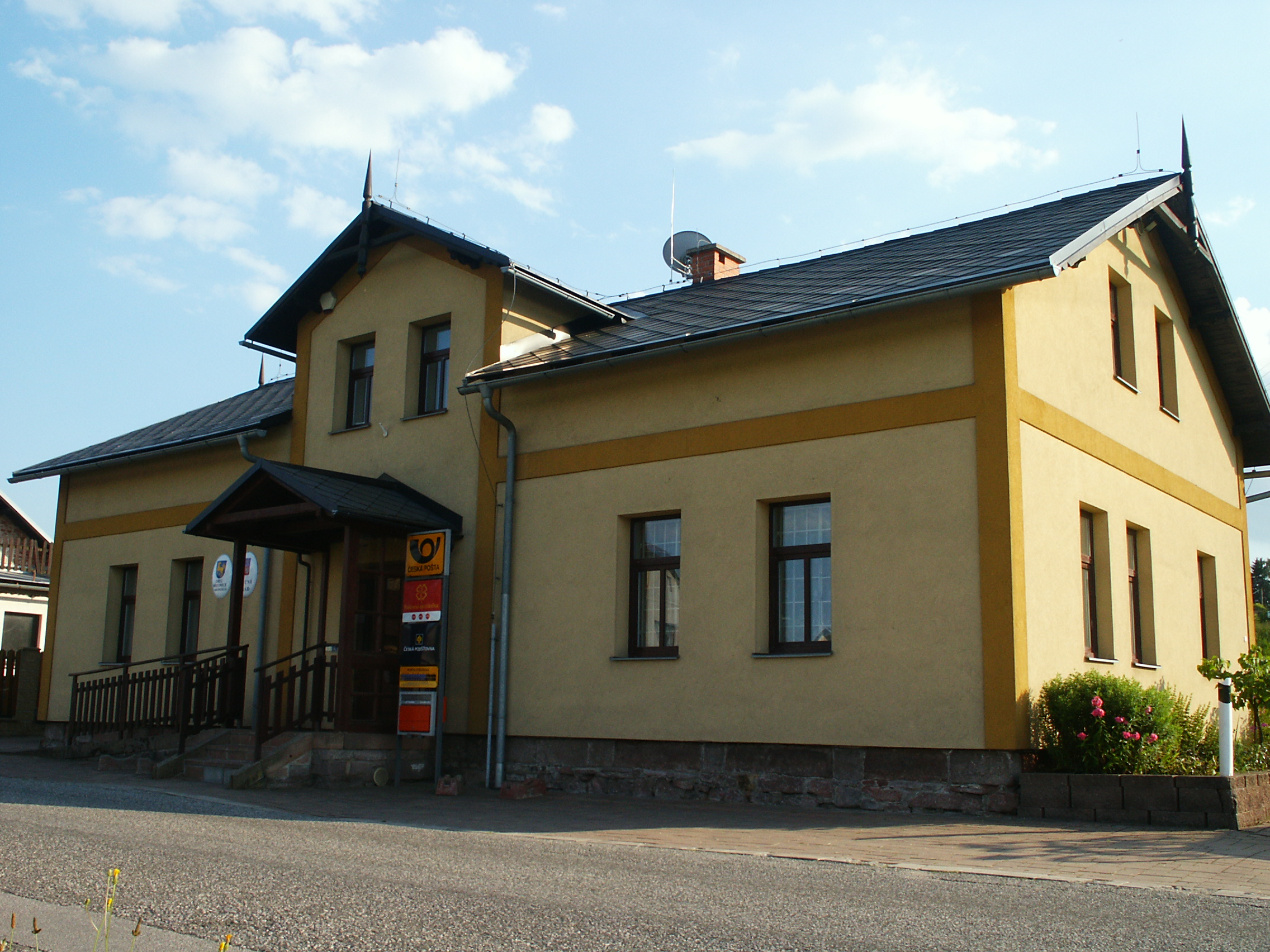
- Municipal office

- Flag Coat of arms

- Location in the Czech Republic
- Coordinates: 50°34′51″N 15°32′0″E
- Country: Czech Republic
- Region: Liberec
- District: Semily
- First mentioned: 1492

Area
  - Total: 3.27 km^{2} (1.26 sq mi)
- Elevation: 482 m (1,581 ft)

Population (2026-01-01)
  - Total: 623
  - Density: 191/km^{2} (493/sq mi)
- Time zone: UTC+1 (CET)
  - Summer (DST): UTC+2 (CEST)
- Postal code: 512 32
- Website: www.martinicevkrk.cz

Martinice v Krkonoších is a municipality and village in Semily District in the Liberec Region of the Czech Republic. It has about 600 inhabitants.

== Etymology ==
The name Martinice is derived from the personal name Martin, meaning "the village of Martin's people". The suffix v Krkonoších means "in the Giant Mountains".

== Geography ==
Studenec is located about 38 kilometres (24 mi) southeast of Liberec. It lies in the Giant Mountains Foothills. The highest point is the hill Hůra at 567 m (1,860 ft) above sea level. The Jilemka Stream flows through the municipality and supplies there the fishpond Zákřežník.

== History ==
The first written mention of Martinice v Krkonoších is from 1492, when it was owned by the Waldstein family and the village became part of the Jilemnice estate. In 1657, the estate was purchased by the Harant of Bezdružice family. From 1701 to 1945, the estate was owned by the Harrach family.

== Demographics ==
Historical population

Year	Pop.	±%
1869	764	—
1880	790	+3.4%
1890	852	+7.8%
1900	938	+10.1%
1910	1,009	+7.6%

Year	Pop.	±%
1921	893	−11.5%
1930	953	+6.7%
1950	703	−26.2%
1961	724	+3.0%
1970	669	−7.6%

Year	Pop.	±%
1980	640	−4.3%
1991	583	−8.9%
2001	574	−1.5%
2011	563	−1.9%
2021	617	+9.6%

Source: Censuses

== Transport ==
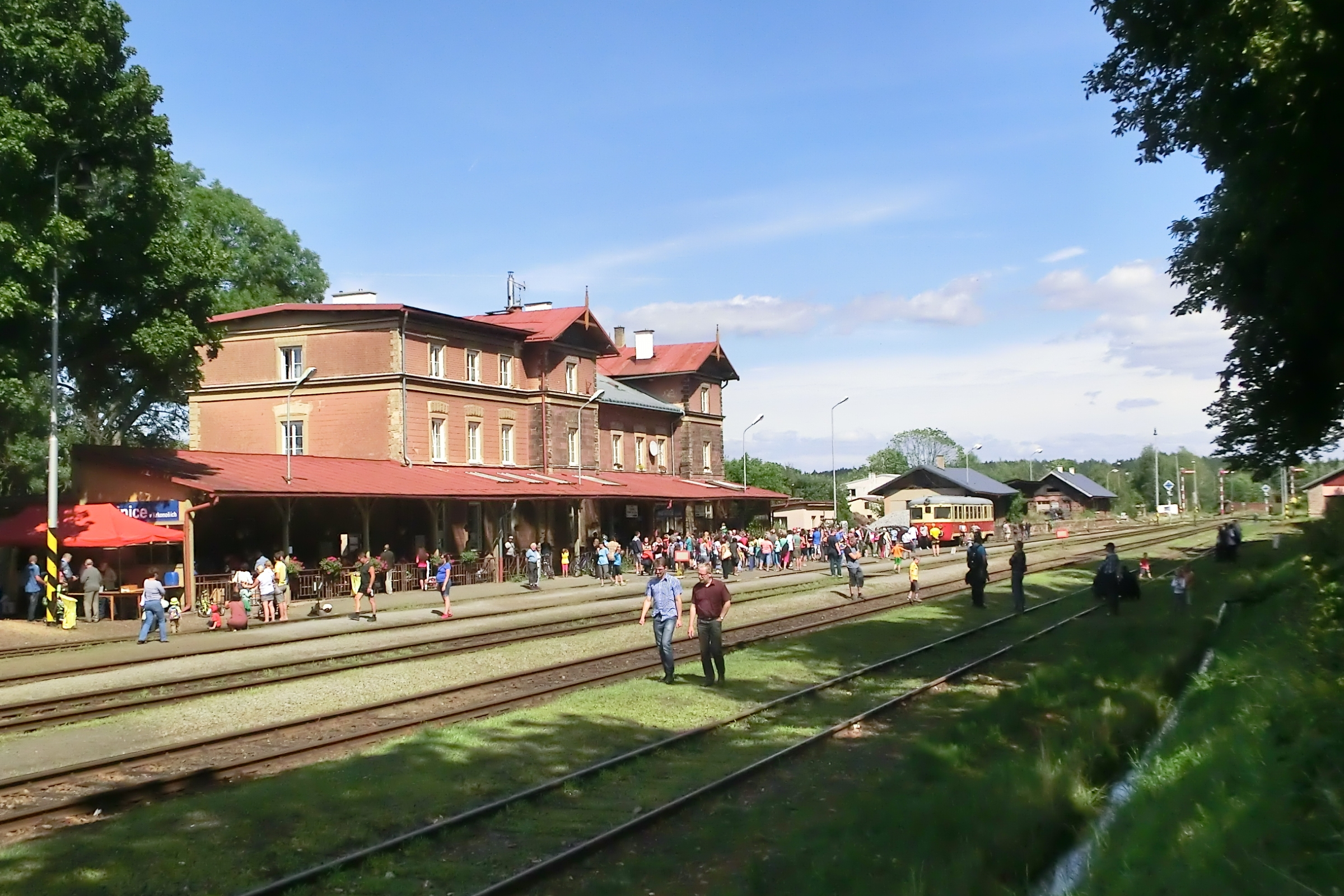
Railway station

Martinice v Krkonoších is located on the railway lines Kolín–Trutnov and Martinice v Krkonoších–Jablonec nad Jizerou.

== Sights ==
Among the protected cultural monuments in the municipality are a sandstone column shrine from 1838 and the railway station. The railway station complex consists of buildings from the years 1871–1948, and is thus a unique document of the system of management and security of railway traffic during the 19th and 20th centuries. The station building houses the Railway Museum.

A landmark in the centre of the village is the belfry from 1845.
