= Labus =

Labus, Lábus or Labuś is a surname of Slavic origin. The Czech feminine form is Lábusová.

Notable people with this surname include:

- Goran Labus (born 1985), Serbian football goalkeeper
- Jiří Lábus (born 1950), Czech actor
- Ladislav Lábus (born 1951), Czech architect
- Miroljub Labus (born 1947), Serbian politician and economist
- Pepa Lábus (born 1968), Czech singer-songwriter
