= Neviditelný =

Neviditelný (Jaroslav Havlíček) is a Czech novel by Jaroslav Havlíček. It was first published in 1937.

== Plot ==
Ten years since Peter Švajcar married Soňa Hajnová, he decides to write down his memoirs. He was born in a very poor family. He decided to change his destiny. Lucky opportunity is given by Lachmann to study, where he has good perspectives and he decides to study chemistry. He focuses only on getting the best marks during entire period of study and he doesn't care about the usual life of his peers. He has no friends, even though his roommate Dont considers him a close friend. He lives frugally and saves money for his living. Hard work and a strong-willed triumphs over poverty of his family.

One evening in June Karel Dont convinces him to come to a party, where he promises Peter to acquaint him with Soňa Hajnová, the daughter of a wealthy soap factory owner. The vision of potential inheritance of a thriving factory drives Peter to marry Soňa Hajnová. Using perfect deception and some manipulations he manages to win her heart. After the engagement is invited to Hajn family's villa, where for the first time he meets the family. He is not deterred by an uptight, hostile aunt or a fool oppressing the whole family. The proximity of the desired triumph over the wretched circumstances of his family will support him in his decision to marry Soňa. Hajn's father accepts him in the factory as an employee for the time being. Peter already plans its takeover, the modernization of outdated practices, efficient production.

A few months later is the wedding. However, the wedding night is interrupted by a madman who is eagerly waiting in the room of the newlyweds. Soňa is scared and rejects Peter. They prefer to go on their honeymoon, which turns out to be the happiest period in the couple's lives. After returning, however, the situation falls into the old rut - the Invisible One follows Soňa everywhere and she suffers from panic fear and anxiety. Petr spends a lot of time working in the factory and does not care much about his wife. In an unguarded moment, the Invisible One slips into Sona's room, she faints from the shock she suffered, and the madman tries to take advantage of the situation. Fortunately, Katy intervenes in time and calls Peter to the factory. Soňa remains locked in her room with only the doctor and refuses to let anyone near her. The doctor discovers that she is pregnant. Peter wants to get the Invisible One out of the house so that the child he is very much looking forward to can develop without his mother's constant fear of the madman. He tells Hajn about the disruption of the wedding night and presents the madman's manifestos testifying to his dangerousness (the madman in them is no longer a warlord, but an invisible seducer and seducer of women). Despite his aunt's strong protests, the Invisible One is taken to a madhouse. He begins to take revenge on Soňa and spend long days talking to her in her room, deepening her torment caused by the psychological shock. As a result, strange changes begin to happen to Soňa's mental health. She does not accept any logical arguments and instead becomes obsessed with the Invisible, believing him to be the father of her child and claiming that he is now truly invisible and has returned. He loses the ability to think rationally and must be constantly supervised. After the birth of the child, her condition does not improve, on the contrary, she begins to hate Peter and refuses to lend him her son. At that time, Katy becomes Petr's lover. Soňa is really dangerous to her child and cannot handle it carefully. Petr only cares about his own son and decides to take him away from his mother, but she becomes furious and tries to commit suicide several times. Due to the constant noise and stress caused by the crazy mother, Petr is worried about his son's mental development. Deciding to take advantage of Sonia's suicidal tendencies, he unlocks the door to her room - and she jumps out the window. It looks like an unfortunate accident caused by Katy's carelessness, the girl is remorseful and cares for little Petr as her own.

Petr and Katy and their son form a relatively good family. Little Petřík is growing up and his future is starting to look promising. But then he falls ill with meningitis. Despite a small chance of survival, he is saved, but it has permanent consequences - his mental development remains at the level of a toddler. He is growing fast and getting stronger, but he is already lost to Peter. The factory is his last hope. When the aunt and Hajn died, Petr discovers that according to the will, Soňa's son inherits all the property and he is only to manage it. So he resigns himself to everything, believes in the adversity of fate, which according to him is against him in everything, and stops trying for anything, he neglects the factory where he used to work so hard for his son, he doesn't care about everything anymore, and he only observes the gradual decay family and his property.
