= Ruce =

Ruce may refer to:

- Ruce (book), a book of poems by Otokar Březina
- "Ruce" (short story), a Czech short story by Jan Weiss
