= Jan Weiss =

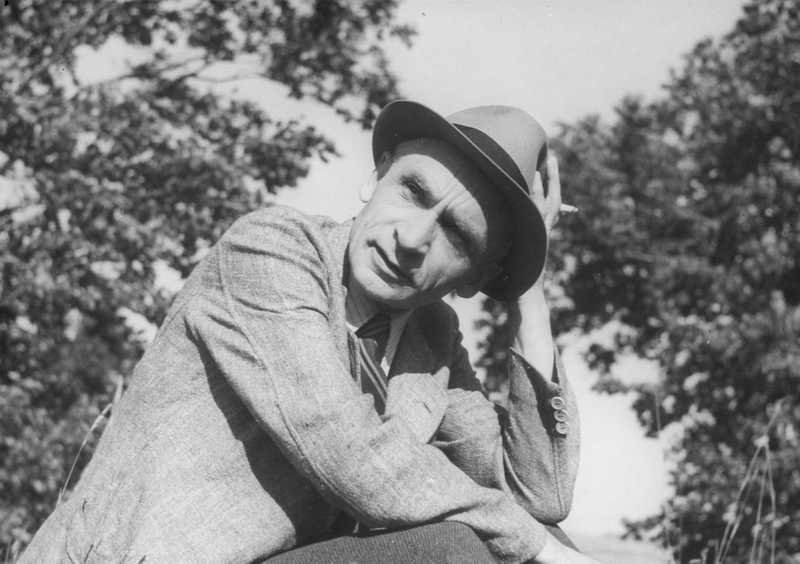
- Jan Weiss; Photo by Zdenko Feyfar, cca 1942
- Born: 10 May 1892; Jilemnice
- Died: 7 March 1972 (aged 79)
- Occupations: short story writer, novelist
- Writing career
- Genres: Fantasy, science fiction
- Notable work: Dům o Tisíci Patrech

Jan Weiss (10 May 1892 – 7 March 1972) was a Czechoslovak writer, best known for his surrealist novel House of a Thousand Floors (Czech: Dům o Tisíci Patrech).

== Early life ==
Jan Weiss was born on 10 May 1892, at Valdštejnská 68 in the town of Jilemnice, the son of Josef Weiss and Filoména Richter; his mother died in 1897 when he was five years old, and his father remarried a German woman and had another three children.

In 1913, he finished his secondary education at a gymnasium in Hradec Králové. From 1913 he studied law in Vienna, but only completed two semesters before being forced to enlist in the army in 1914 due to World War I. In 1916, he was captured in Tarnopol and spent his time in two prisoner camps in Siberia, where he contracted Typhoid fever. His experience with fellow prisoners suffering from typhoid was a main inspiration for some of his earlier works, such as Barák Smrti. In 1917 he was transferred to the camp in Beryozovka, Zabaykalsky Krai, where his thumbs were amputated due to frostbite. There, he joined the Czechoslovak Legions in 1919.

He returned to Czechoslovakia in February 1920, working at the Ministry for Public Works (Czech: veřejné práce). At this time he was lodged in Borome, thanks to his uncle, a priest in Choteč.

== Writing ==
Weiss wrote his first prose in 1918 in Žitomír. While in Russia he wrote the drama Penza, which he finished in Irkutsk.

His first stories were published in magazines. In 1924 his story "A Dream" (Czech: Sen) was published in Cesta magazine, and then later in the same year in Národní Osvobození (English: national liberation).

In 1925 Weiss met Jaroslav Havlíček, with whom he remained in contact until the latter's death in 1943. In the years 1926-1927 Penza was published in Legionářské besedy, with the help of editor-in-chief Josef Masařík, for which Weiss received the Award of the Czech Academy. Around the same time, he became a member of the Artistic Forum (where he met Karel Zezima, a later reviewer of his work), the Circle of Czech Writers (where his membership was proposed by Rudolf Medek) and the Radio žurnálu (Radio Journal), thanks to the recommendation of Ladislav Plechatý.

In Prague he visited many cafés, including Café Slavia and Union A, where he regularly met Josef Masařík, Rudolf Medek, and J.O.Novotný, the editor of Legionářské besedy and the literary magazine Cesta. In 1926 he met his future wife Jaroslava Rašková, whom he married in 1928 in the Old Town Hall of Prague, with Ladislav Plechatý and Josef Masařík as witnesses.

In 1927, he made his "triple" debut, with his first three books: Barák Smrti, Fantóm Smíchu and Zrcadlo, které se opožďuje. On 29 June 1929, Weiss's daughter Jana was born. That same year he published his most well-known work, House of a Thousand Floors (Czech: Dům o Tisíci Patrech), one of the first science fiction novels in European literature.

Weiss retired from his job at the Public Works Ministry in 1947 and published stories until 1964. He also wrote under the name 'Jan Žalský'.
