= Marcela Krůzová =

Czech footballer

Personal information
- Full name: Marcela Krůzová
- Date of birth: 25 July 1990 (age 36)
- Place of birth: Trutnov, Czechoslovakia
- Height: 1.73 m (5 ft 8 in)
- Positions: Midfielder; striker

Senior career*
| Years | Team | Apps | (Gls) |
- Slávia Hradec Králové
| | Slavia Prague | 53 | (14) |

International career
| 2008–2011 | Czech Republic | 7 | (1) |
- * Club domestic league appearances and goals

Marcela Krůzová is a retired Czech football striker, who played for Slavia Prague in the Czech First Division.

She was a member of the Czech national team.
