= Jablonec nad Jizerou =

- Town
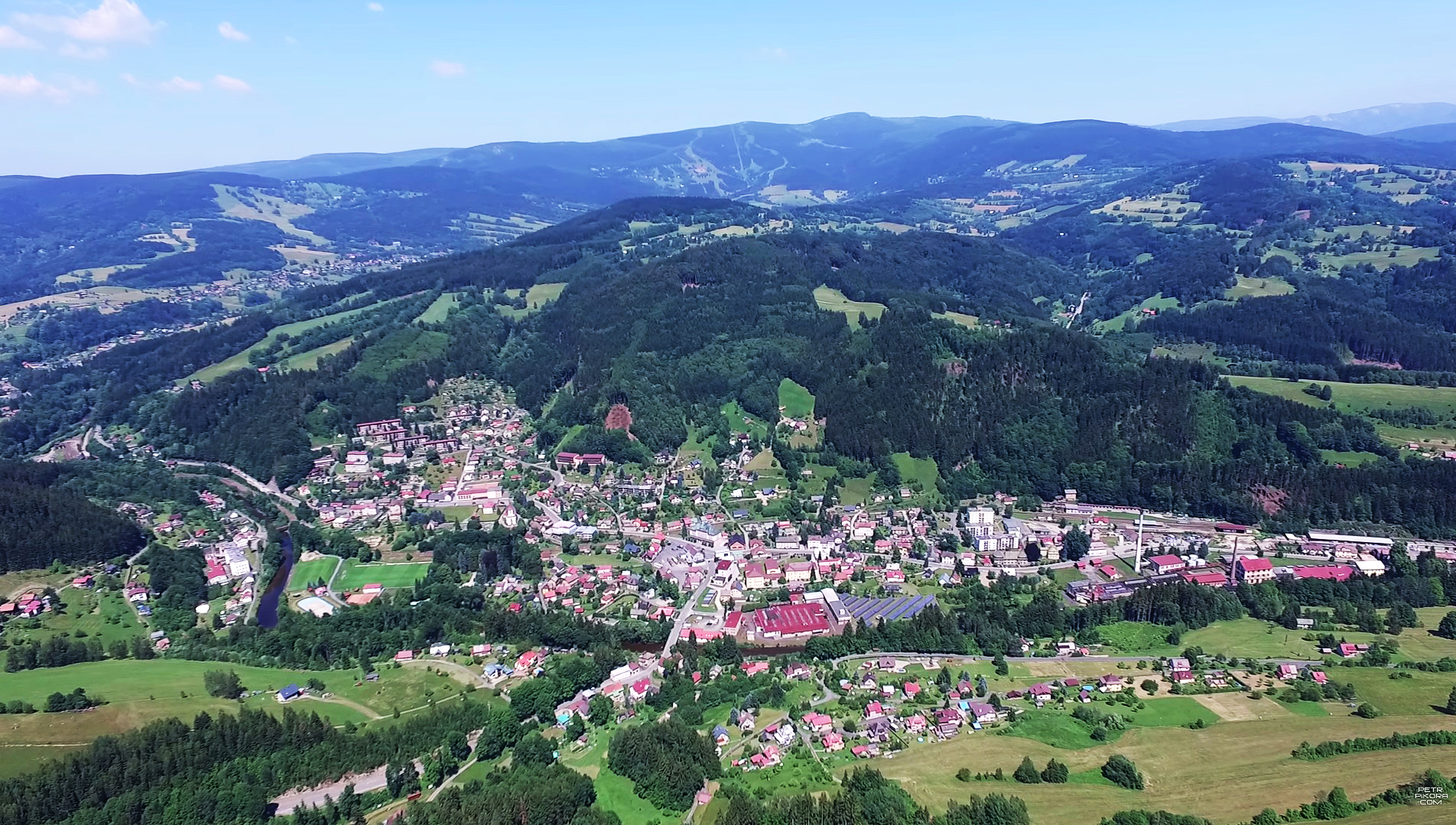
- General view

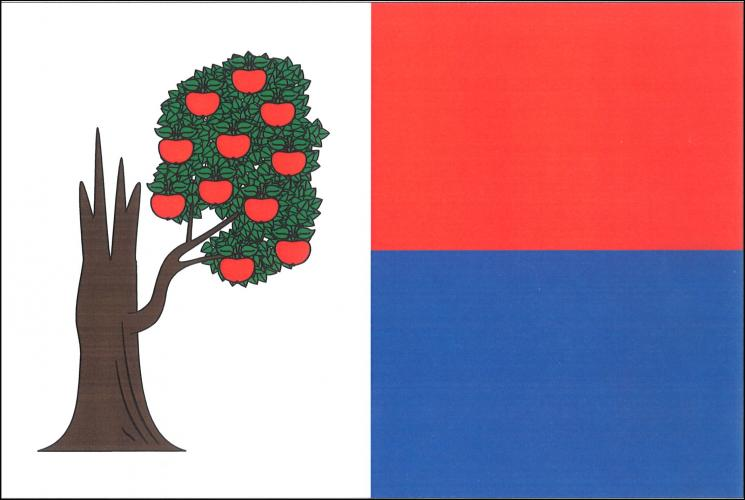
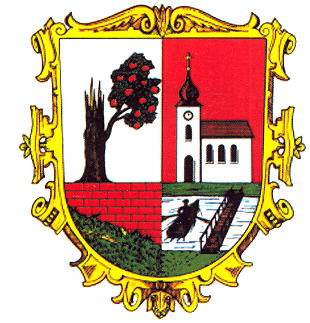
- Flag Coat of arms

- Location in the Czech Republic
- Coordinates: 50°42′24″N 15°26′4″E
- Country: Czech Republic
- Region: Liberec
- District: Semily
- First mentioned: 1492

Government
  - Mayor: Miroslav Kubát

Area
  - Total: 22.32 km^{2} (8.62 sq mi)
- Elevation: 450 m (1,480 ft)

Population (2026-01-01)
  - Total: 1,592
  - Density: 71.33/km^{2} (184.7/sq mi)
- Time zone: UTC+1 (CET)
  - Summer (DST): UTC+2 (CEST)
- Postal codes: 512 43, 514 01
- Website: www.jablonecnjiz.cz

Jablonec nad Jizerou (Czech pronunciation: [ˈjablonɛts ˈnad jɪzɛrou]; German: Jablonetz an der Iser) is a town in Semily District in the Liberec Region of the Czech Republic. It has about 1,600 inhabitants. The town proper is located on the Jizera River in the Giant Mountains Foothills. The most important monument is the timbered watermill Janata's Mill, which is protected as a national cultural monument.

== Administrative division ==
Jablonec nad Jizerou consists of 11 municipal parts (in brackets population according to the 2021 census):

- Jablonec nad Jizerou (1,030)
- Blansko (150)
- Bratrouchov (62)
- Buřany (29)
- Dolní Dušnice (31)
- Dolní Tříč (11)
- Horní Dušnice (24)
- Hradsko (81)
- Končiny (26)
- Stromkovice (25)
- Vojtěšice (22)

== Etymology ==
The name Jablonec was probably derived from the Old Czech word jabloncje (i.e. 'little apple tree'), which was a common tree in the location. Due to its location, there is one more possible explanation of the name origin: it could originate from the Latin gabella, meaning 'customs station'.

In 1916 or 1921, the prefix nad Jizerou ('upon the Jizera') was added to distinguish from the city of Jablonec nad Nisou.

== Geography ==
Jablonec nad Jizerou is located about 13 kilometres (8 mi) northeast of Semily and 26 km (16 mi) east of Liberec. The municipal territory lies mostly in the Giant Mountains Foothills, but it also extends into the Giant Mountains in the east. The highest point is the mountain Preislerův kopec at 1,035 m (3,396 ft) above sea level. The town is situated on the Jizera River.

== History ==
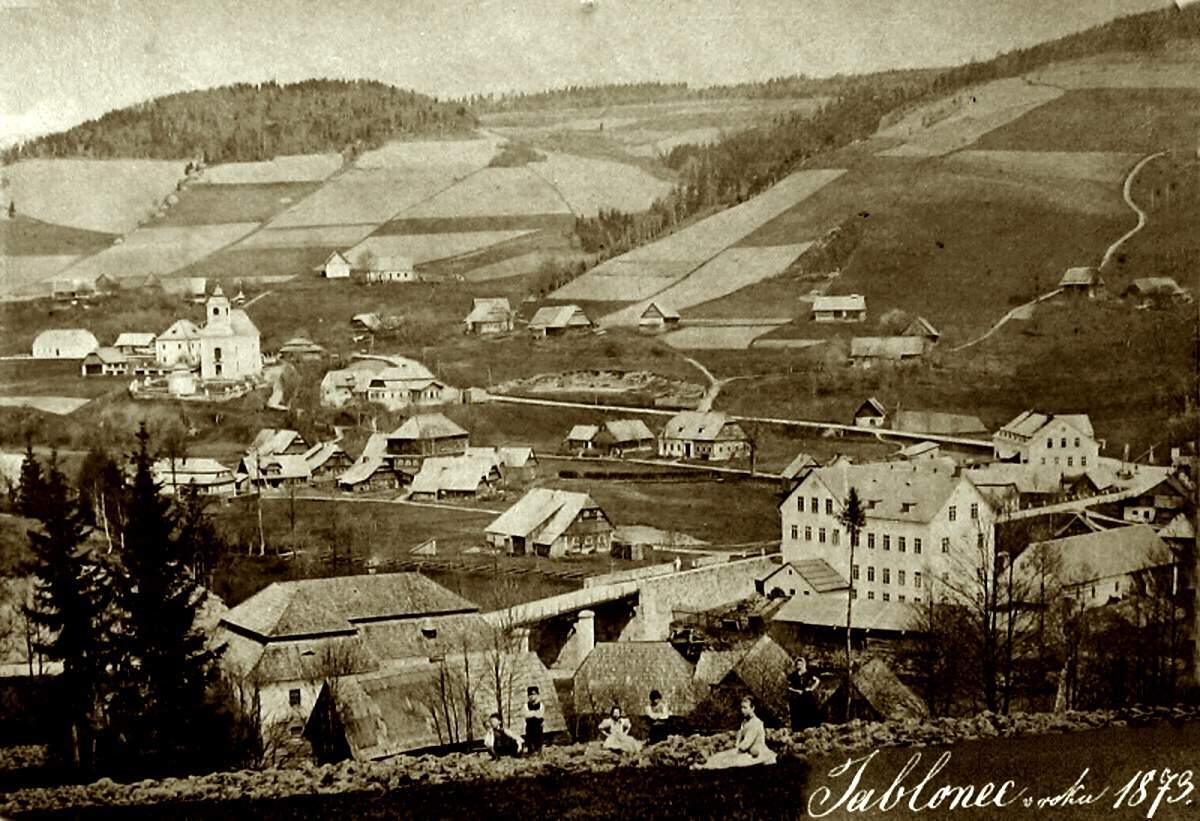
Jablonec in 1873, view from Dolní Tříč

The first written mention of Jablonec is from 1492.

Until the Thirty Years' War, Jablonec was a small non-agricultural village of thirteen houses, but the significance of the village indicates the existence of the parish church. The Thirty Years' War (1618–1648) had a catastrophic impact on Jablonec – only four houses remained. It took hundred years before Jablonec recovered from the war.

An already medieval built-up area, which is probably to be found in the vicinity of the Church of Saint Procopius (originally wooden, from bricks since 1777 thanks to the support of Ernst Adalbert of Harrach) had more diffusive character, also the area from the second half of the 18th century was almost out of order on the slope of the valley.

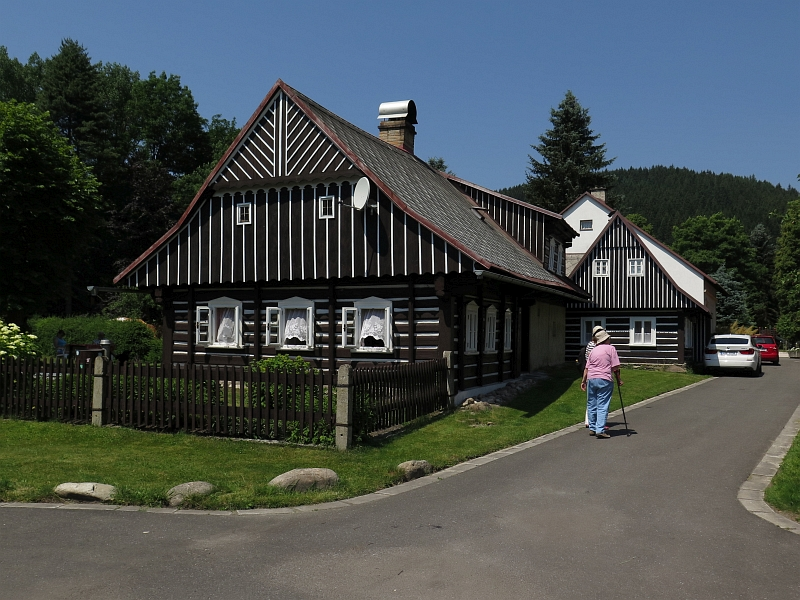
Timbered houses

The only organisational factors were contour lines and parcels of land, a completely non-agricultural dwelling were chaotically centered on the link between the church and the mill. Thanks to the large reconstruction of the market town connected with the construction of the railway (1899) and the textile factories along the Jizera, Jablonec nad Jizerou gained the character of a modern mountainous town.

In the second half of the 19th century, Jablonec grew rapidly, and in 1896, Jablonec was promoted to a market town by Emperor Franz Joseph I. At this time Jablonec was also given the new coat of arms.

In 1971, Jablonec nad Jizerou was promoted to a town.

Today among the new buildings from the turn of the 19th and 20th centuries and from the interwar period are sporadically preserved timbered houses.

== Demographics ==
Historical population

Year	Pop.	±%
1869	3,593	—
1880	3,823	+6.4%
1890	4,149	+8.5%
1900	4,587	+10.6%
1910	4,487	−2.2%

Year	Pop.	±%
1921	3,714	−17.2%
1930	3,637	−2.1%
1950	2,310	−36.5%
1961	2,385	+3.2%
1970	2,093	−12.2%

Year	Pop.	±%
1980	2,112	+0.9%
1991	2,028	−4.0%
2001	1,976	−2.6%
2011	1,704	−13.8%
2021	1,491	−12.5%

Source: Censuses

== Transport ==
The I/14 road from Liberec to Trutnov runs through the town.

Jablonec nad Jizerou is the terminus and start of the railway line from/to Martinice v Krkonoších.

== Sport ==
In Jablonec nad Jizerou is the Ski Resort Kamenec with 3,280 m (10,760 ft) of downhill slopes and two ski lifts. It is located on a hill at 688 m (2,257 ft) above sea level.

== Sights ==
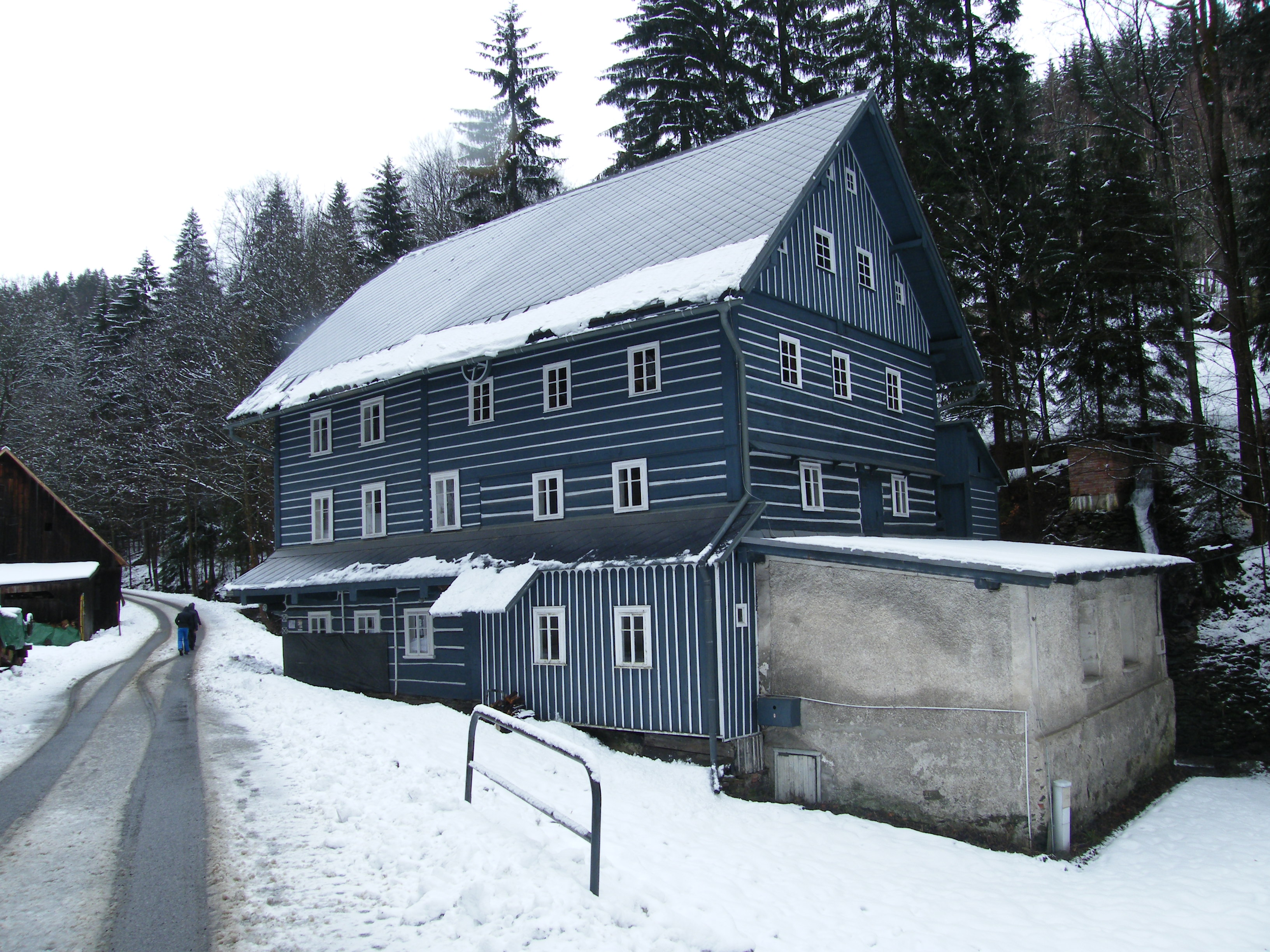
Janata's Mill in Buřany

The most important monument is the Janata's Mill in Buřany. It is a timbered watermill from 1767 with preserved and still functional equipment. Its current appearance is the result of building modifications from the 19th century. It is protected as a national cultural monument.

The main landmark of Jablonec nad Jizerou is the Church of Saint Procopius. It was built in the Baroque style in 1777.

== Twin towns – sister cities ==
Jablonec nad Jizerou is twinned with:

- Sulzbach, Germany

== Gallery ==
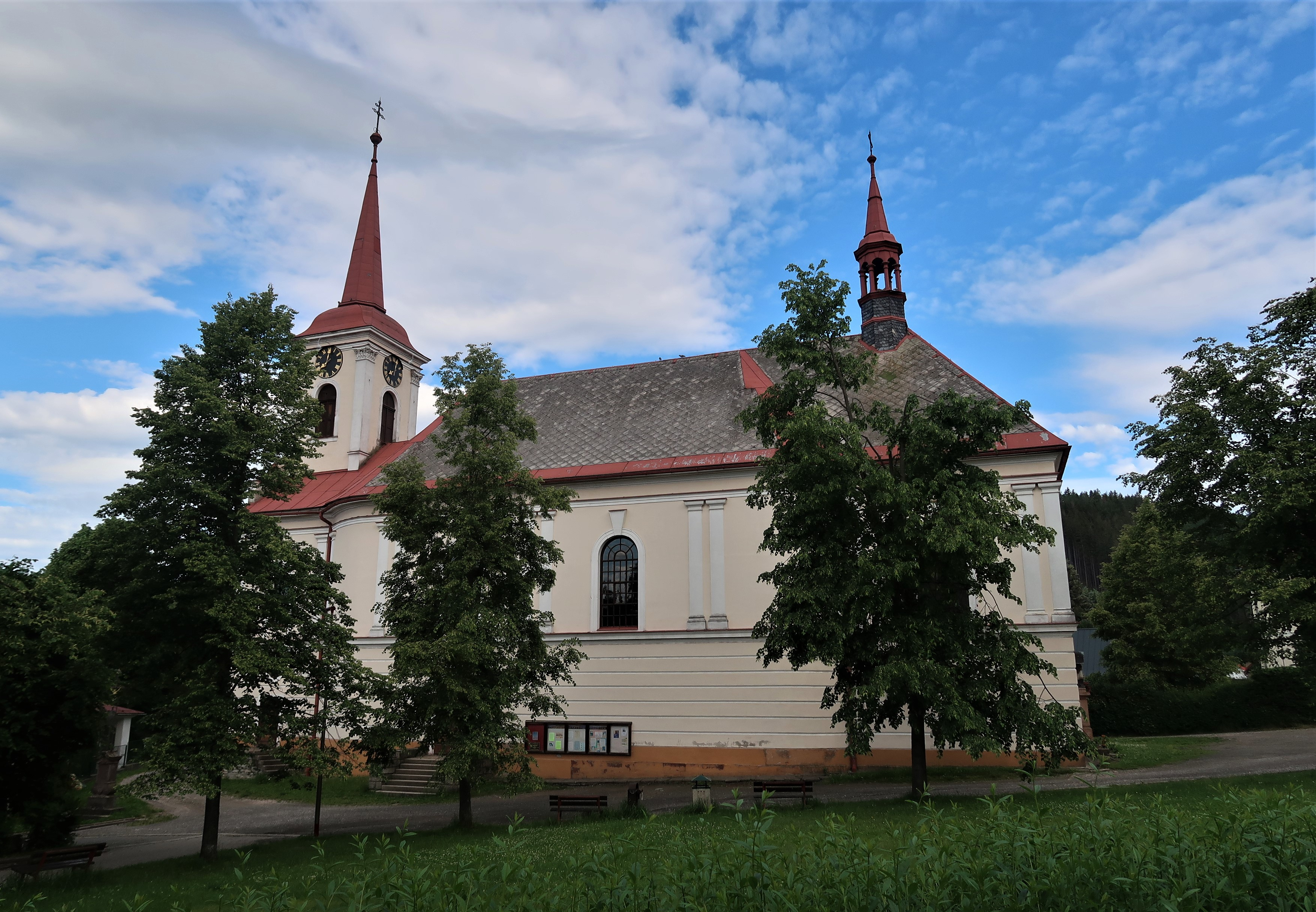
Church of Saint Procopius

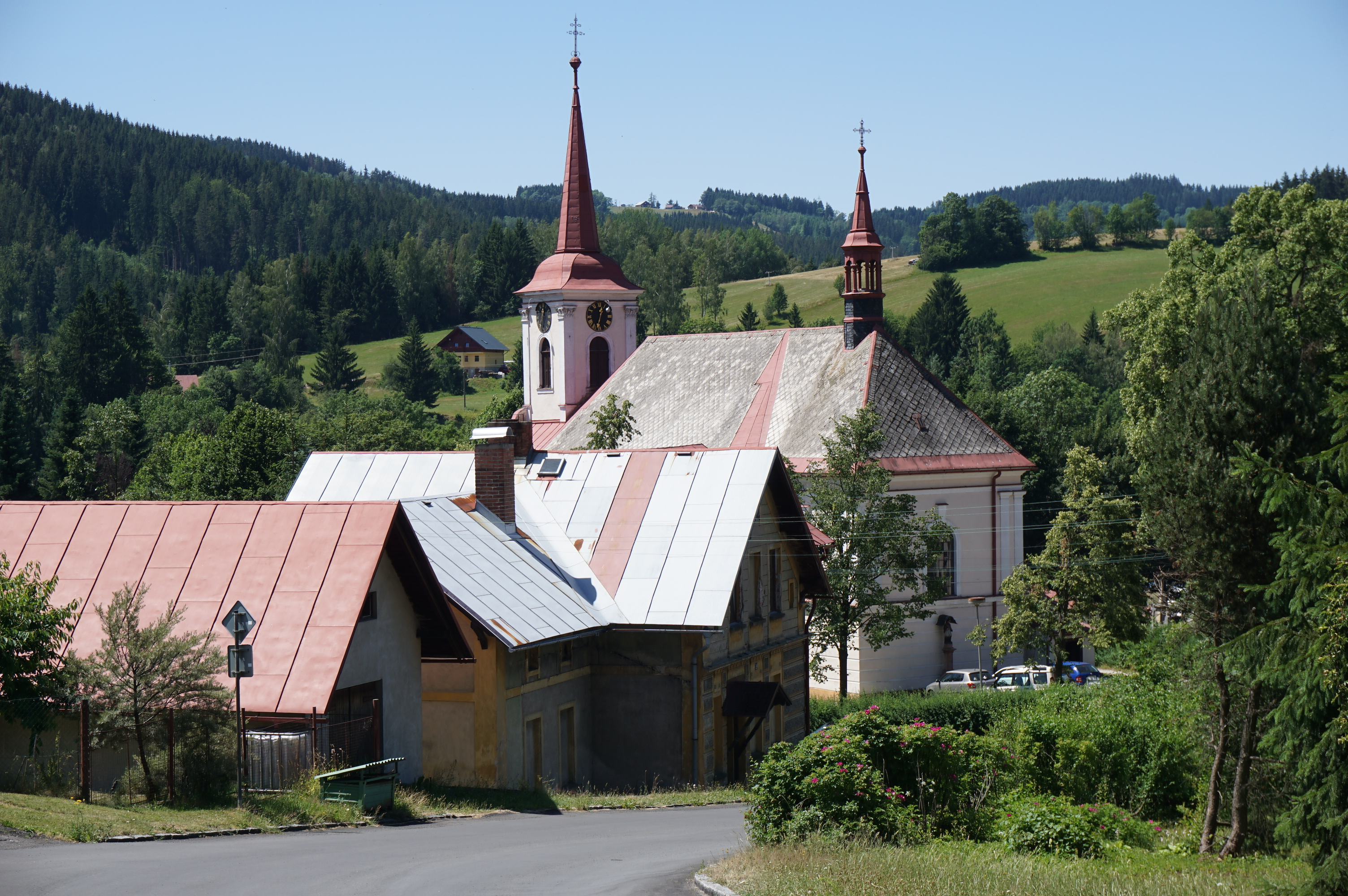
View towards the church

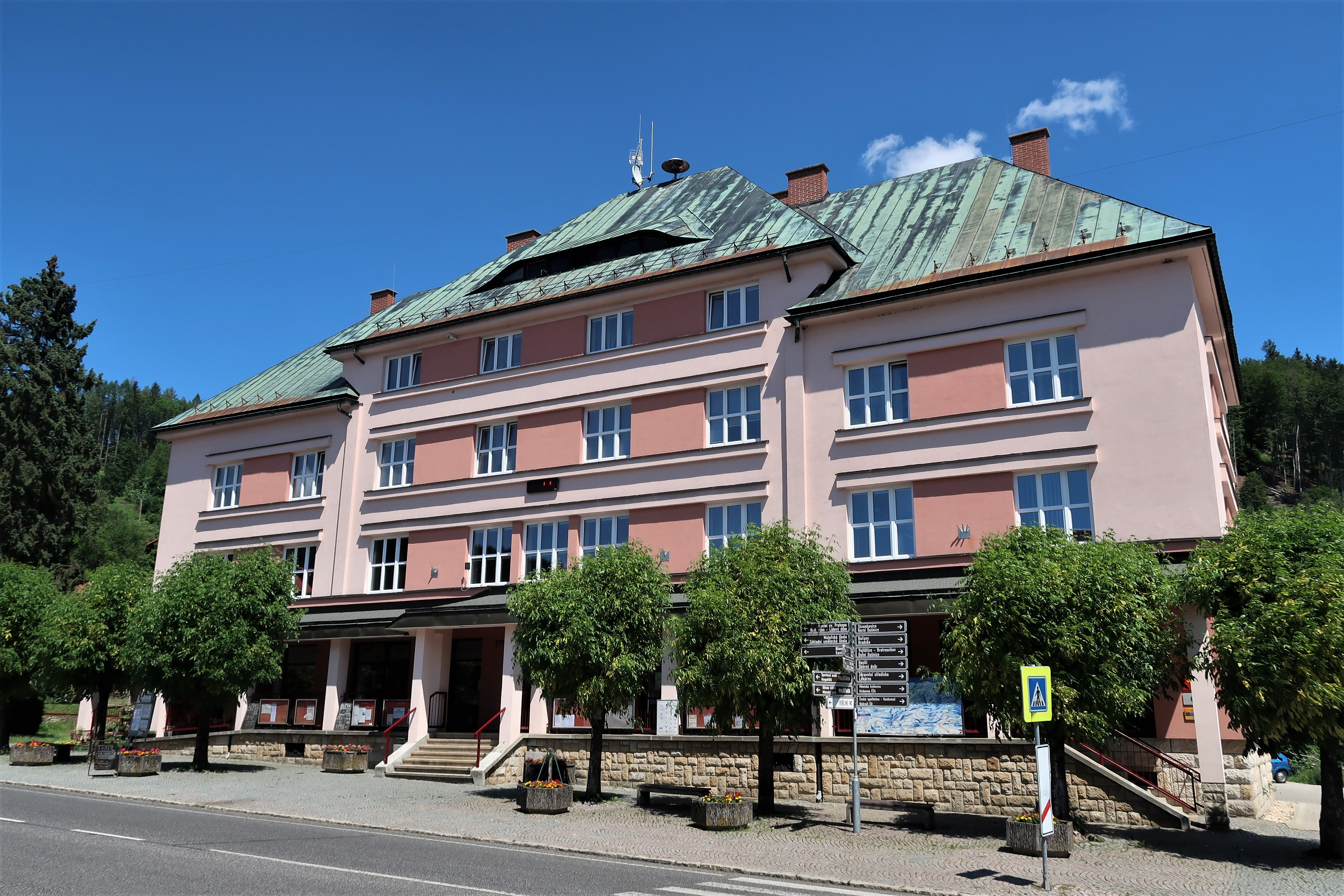
Town hall
