= Pivovar Krakonoš =

Brewery in Trutnov, Czech Republic

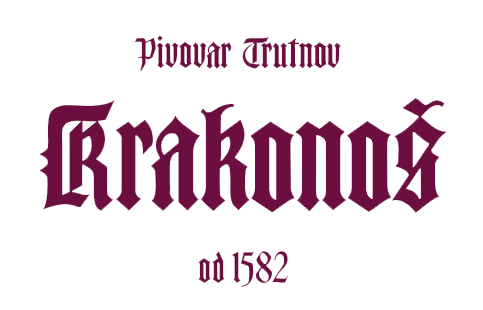

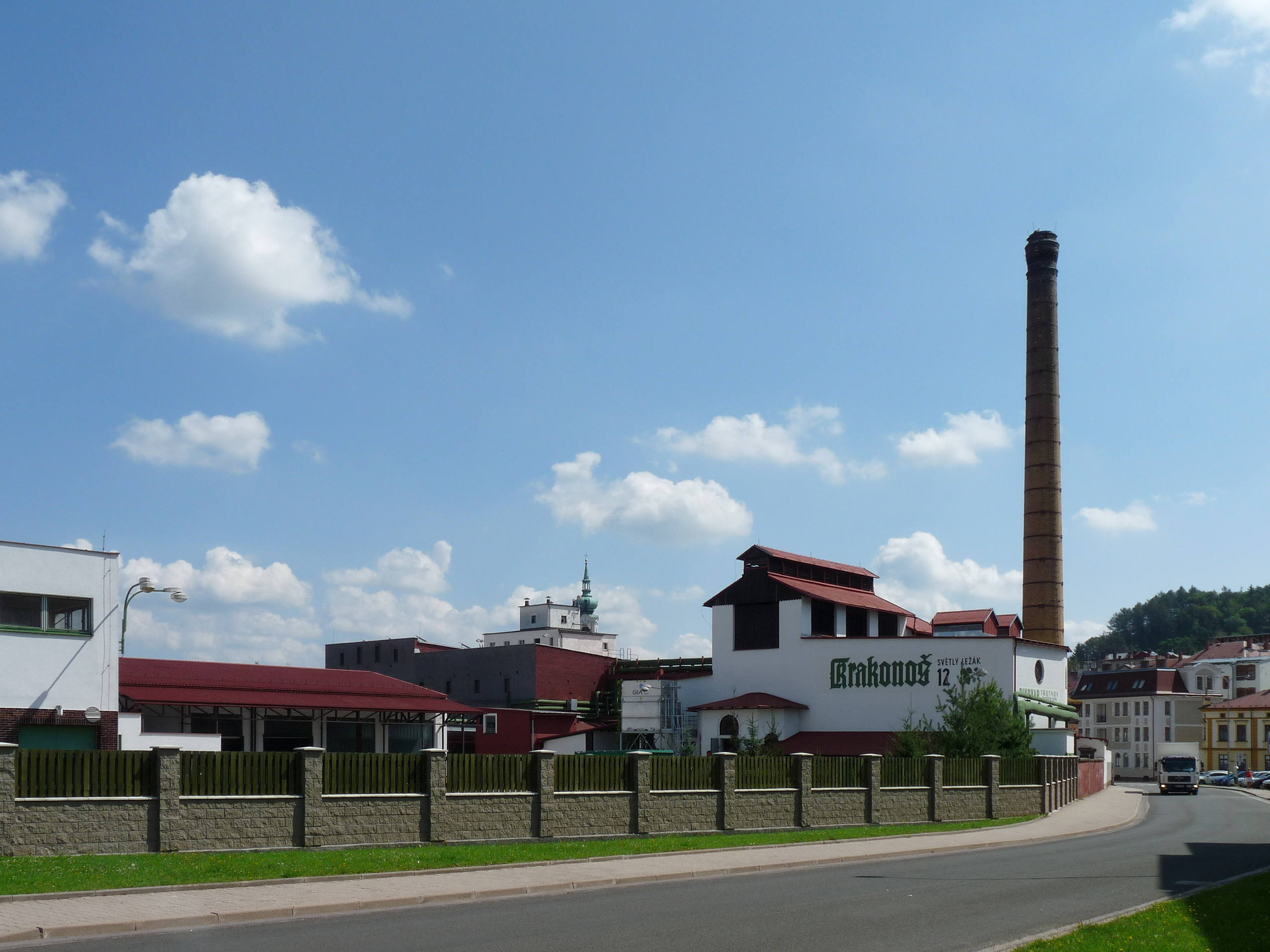
- Pivovar Krakonoš
- Interactive map of Pivovar Krakonoš
- Location: Trutnov, Czech Republic
- Coordinates: 50°33′41.04″N 15°54′33.84″E
- Opened: 1582; 444 years ago
- Owner: Krakonoš spol. s.r.o.
- Website: www.pivovar-krakonos.cz

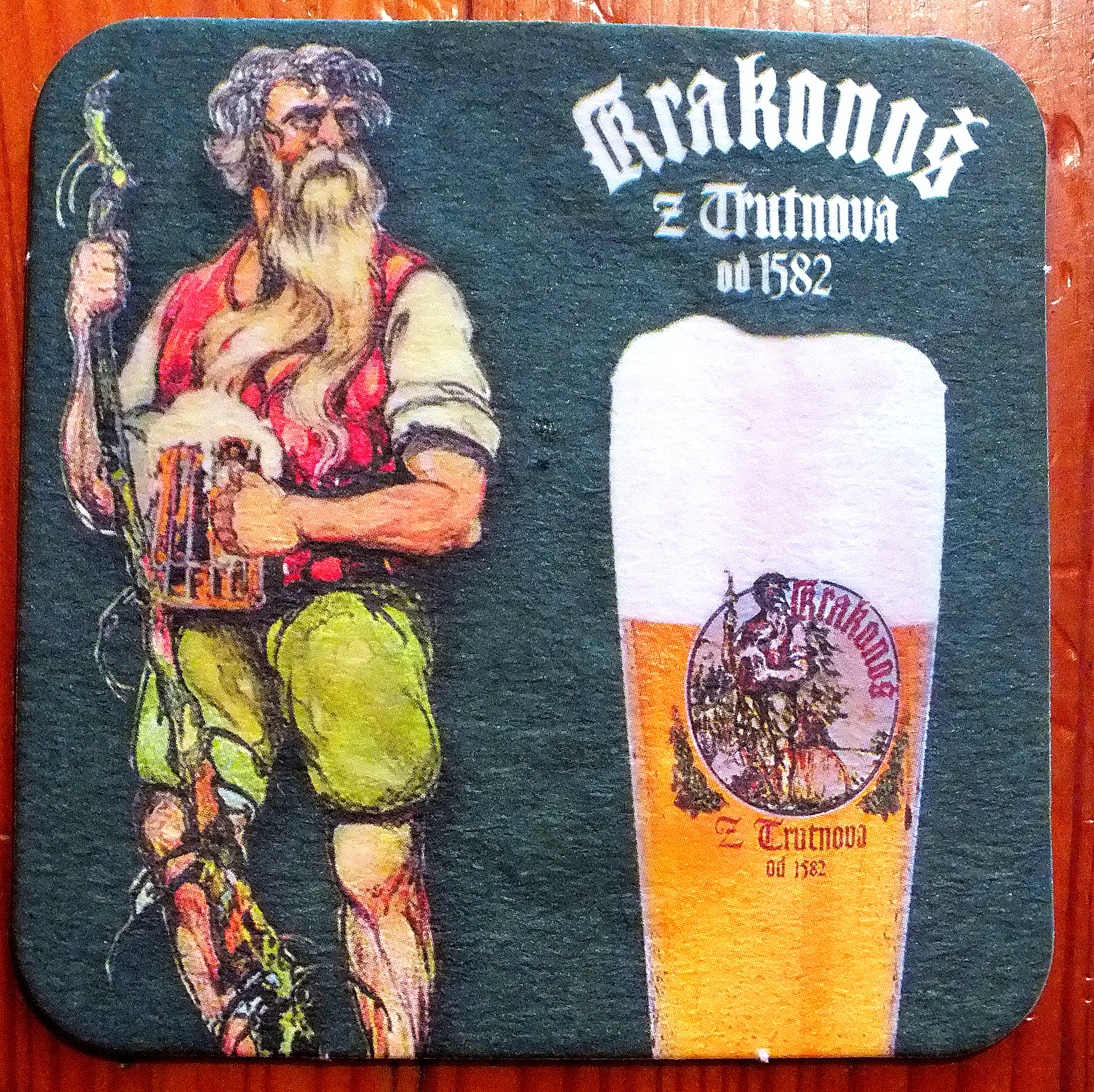
Krakonoš beer coaster

Pivovar Krakonoš is one of the oldest breweries in the Czech Republic. Founded in 1582 and located in Trutnov town, the annual production of light and dark beers exceeds 100,000 hectoliters.

In 1974, future Czech president Václav Havel worked here, and was inspired to write a theater play, Audience, whose story is situated in the brewery.

== See also ==
- List of oldest companies
