= Norbert Eimer =

German politician (1940–2021)

Member of the Bundestag
- In office 14 December 1976 – 10 November 1994

Personal details
- Born: 19 March 1940 Trautenau, Sudetenland, Germany
- Died: 3 February 2021 (aged 80)
- Party: FDP

Norbert Eimer (19 March 1940 – 3 February 2021) was a German politician of the Free Democratic Party (FDP) who served as member of the German Bundestag.

== Life ==
Eimer entered the German Bundestag in the 1976 federal elections via the FDP state list in Bavaria in West Germany and Germany and was a member of the Bundestag throughout until 1994. Until 1987 he was a member of the committee for youth, family and health. From 1987 to 1990 he was on the Committee for Youth, Family, Women and Health.

== Literature ==
Herbst, Ludolf; Jahn, Bruno (2002). Vierhaus, Rudolf (ed.). Biographisches Handbuch der Mitglieder des Deutschen Bundestages. 1949–2002 [Biographical Handbook of the Members of the German Bundestag. 1949–2002] (in German). München: De Gruyter – De Gruyter Saur. p. 1715. ISBN 978-3-11-184511-1.
