= Josef Jan Hanuš =

- Born: 13 September 1911; Dolní Štěpanice, Czechoslovakia
- Died: 21 April 1992 (aged 80)
- Relatives: Wife: Lilian Evelyn Webb; Two children
- Military career
- Allegiance: Czechoslovakia France; United Kingdom; Czechoslovakia United Kingdom
- Branch: Czechoslovak Air Force Royal Air Force; Czechoslovak Air Force Royal Air Force
- Service years: 1932–68
- Rank: Squadron Leader (RAF), Lieutenant-Colonel (Czechoslovak Air Force)
- Units: 1st Air Regiment 4th Observation Squadron; Groupe de Chasse III/1; No. 310 Squadron RAF; No. 32 Squadron RAF; No. 245 Squadron RAF; No. 600 Squadron RAF; No. 125 Squadron RAF; No. 68 Squadron RAF; No. 23 Squadron RAF No. 141 Squadron RAF
- Conflicts: Second World War; Battle of France; Battle of Britain; North African campaign; Allied invasion of Sicily; Italian campaign
- Awards: Distinguished Flying Cross; 1939–1945 Star with Battle of Britain clasp; Air Crew Europe Star with Atlantic clasp; Africa Star; Italy Star; Defence Medal; War Medal 1939–1945; Czechoslovak War Cross × 3; Československá medaile Za chrabrost před nepřítelem × 5; Československá medaile za zásluhy 1st class; Pamětní medaile československé armády v zahraničí with France, UK & Middle East clasps; Croix de guerre with palm leaf
- Other work: International Computers Limited

Josef Jan Hanuš DFC (13 September 1911 – 21 April 1992) was a Czechoslovak fighter pilot who served in first the French Air Force and then the Royal Air Force Volunteer Reserve (RAFVR) in the Second World War.

In 1945 after the Second World War, Hanuš returned to Czechoslovakia, but after the 1948 Czechoslovak coup d'état, he escaped back to the United Kingdom and rejoined the Royal Air Force, with which he served until 1968.

Hanuš then had a civilian career with International Computers Limited until his retirement in 1977. He died in England in 1992.

== Early life ==
Hanuš was born in Dolní Štěpanice in northern Bohemia. His father was a metal-worker. He went to school in nearby Jilemnice, passed his Matura and in 1931 went on to study at nearby Jestřebí.

=== Czechoslovak Air Force ===
In 1932, Hanuš joined the Czechoslovak Air Force. He was briefly with the 2nd Observation Squadron of the 1st Air Regiment "Tomáš Garrigue Masaryk" at Prague-Kbely and then was posted to the school for air force officers at Prostějov in Moravia. From June to September 1933, he was with the 1st Air Regiment's 4th Observation Squadron at Cheb in western Bohemia. He trained at the military academy, passed out as a poruchik on 2 July 1935 and returned to the 4th Observation Squadron.

Over the next two years, Hanuš learnt night flying and occasionally was an assistant instructor teaching theory at the air force training school. On 25 April 1938, Hanuš was given a temporary attachment to the Interior Ministry. He was stationed at airfields at Cheb, Terezín in northern Bohemia and Plzeň-Bory in western Bohemia. In his Czechoslovak Air Force career, Hanuš completed 650 flying hours.

On 30 September 1938, France and the United Kingdom allowed Germany to annex the Sudetenland. On 15 March, Germany occupied the remainder of Bohemia and Moravia and imposed a Protectorate of Bohemia and Moravia under a puppet government that it ordered to dissolve its armed forces. The Czechoslovak Air Force ceased to exist, and the Luftwaffe confiscated its aircraft.

=== Escape to Poland ===
On 14 July 1939, Hanuš escaped to Poland, where he reported to the Czechoslovak Consulate in Kraków. He was then accommodated in a Czechoslovak transit camp at Bronowice Małe that had been converted from a disused Austro-Hungarian Army camp. Between 28 July and 1 August, he and other Czechoslovaks, including the future fighter ace Alois Vašátko, sailed from Gdynia to France aboard the Polish ocean liner Chrobry.

== French Air Force ==
France did not yet allow Czechoslovak refugees to join its Armée de l'air. But the Ambassador in Paris for the Czechoslovak government-in-exile reached agreement with the French Government that Czechoslovak volunteers could join the French Foreign Legion for a five-year term, on the understanding that if war broke out they would be released to form a Czechoslovak army in exile. Hanuš joined the Foreign Legion and was posted to a barracks in the Parisian suburb of Nanterre.

On 3 September 1939, France declared war on Germany. The official agreement allowing Czechoslovak airmen to join the Armée de l'air was not reached until 17 November, but one source claims that Hanuš began pilot training in October. Here he proved to be more experienced and skilled than the French pilot who was supposed to be his instructor.

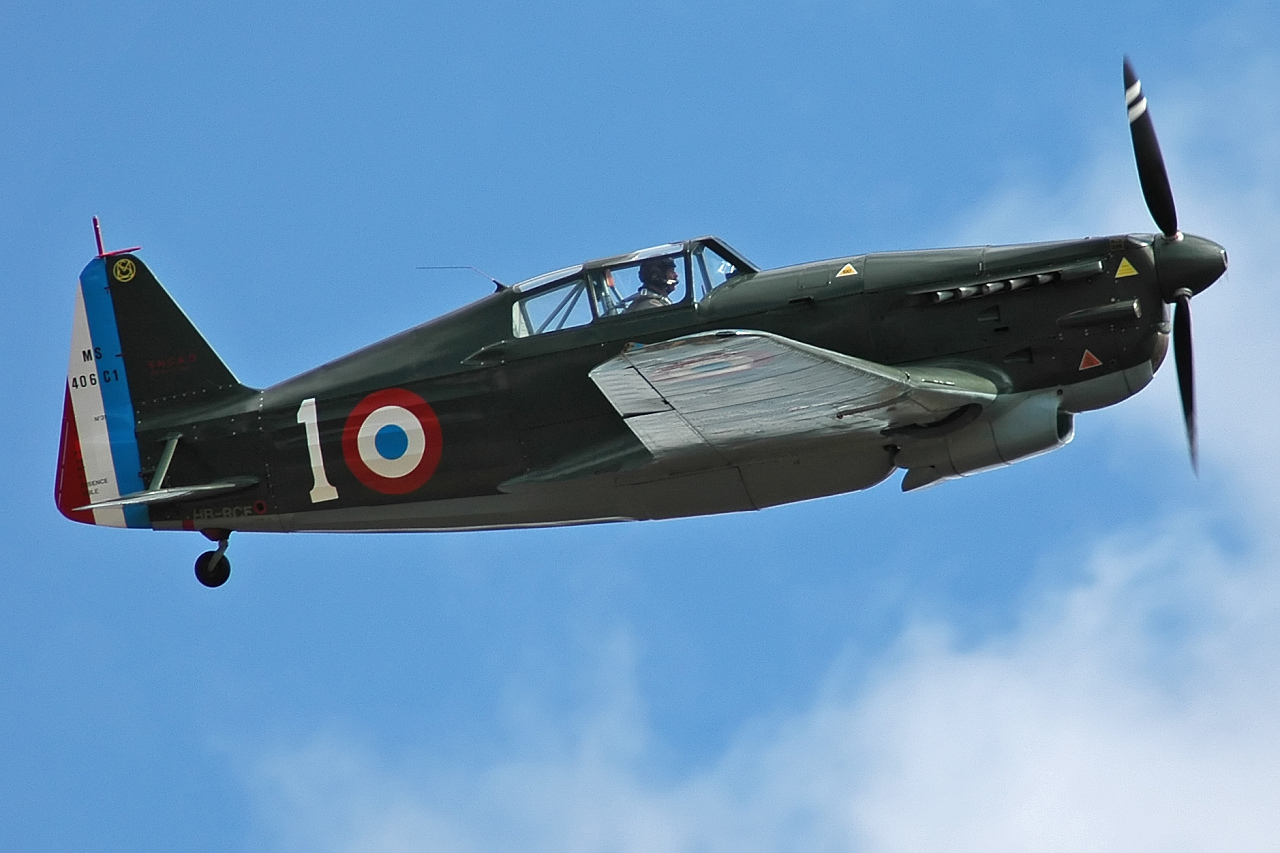
Hanuš was trained on the French Morane-Saulnier M.S.406 fighter

Hanuš was trained on the Morane-Saulnier M.S.406 fighter and then posted to Groupe de Chasse III/1 at Le Plessis-Belleville airfield in the Oise département of northern France. Here he commanded a flight of three aircraft, in which the other two pilots were also Czechoslovaks. Hanuš scored his first victory, as one of a patrol of seven aircraft that shot down a Luftwaffe Henschel Hs 126 reconnaissance aircraft near Herbécourt.

On 10 May 1940, Germany invaded France, and on 22 June France capitulated. Hanuš escaped via Casablanca in Morocco to Gibraltar. There he embarked on the British-India Steam Navigation Company ship Neuralia, which reached Liverpool, England on 12 July.

== Royal Air Force ==
On 2 August 1940, Hanuš joined the RAF Volunteer Reserve. He was re-trained at No. 6 Operational Training Unit and then on 15 October was posted to a Czechoslovak-manned unit, No. 310 Squadron RAF at RAF Duxford in Cambridgeshire. The squadron was operating Hawker Hurricane I fighters and engaged in the final days of the Battle of Britain. By the end of 1940, Hanuš had been promoted, first to flying officer and then to flight lieutenant.

=== Night fighter pilot ===
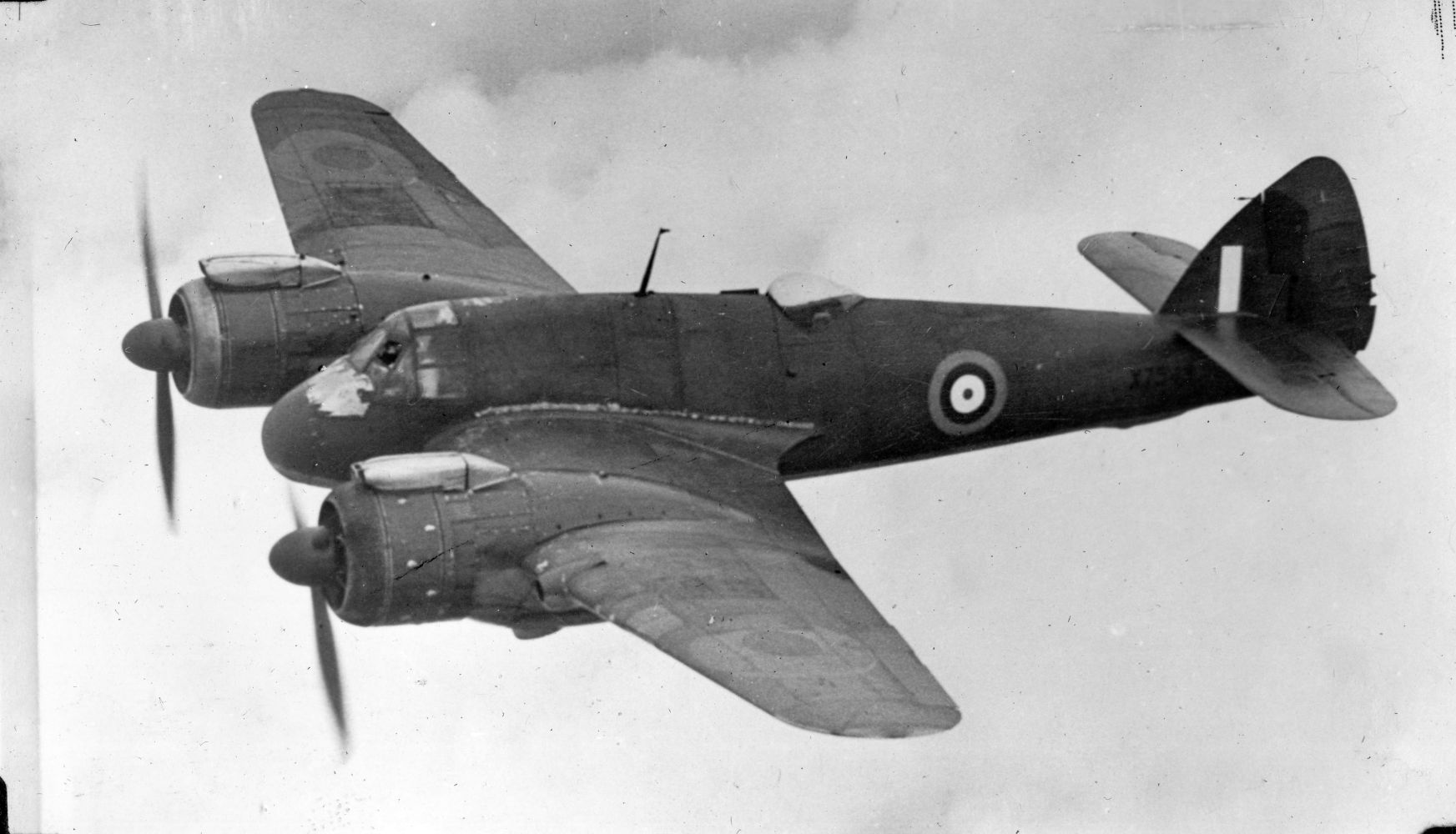
From April 1942 Hanuš flew Bristol Beaufighter night fighters

From June 1941, Hanuš flew with British-manned squadrons. He was with No. 32 Squadron RAF until 18 September, then No. 245 Squadron RAF until 1 April 1942. From 5 to 21 February 1942, he received a fortnight's training in night flying at No. 54 Operational Training Unit. From April 1942, he flew twin-engined, twin-seat Bristol Beaufighter night fighters equipped with AI Mk IV aircraft interception radar. He spent the first half of April with No. 600 Squadron RAF and the second half with No. 125 Squadron RAF, before returning to 600 Squadron on 30 April.

On 1 September 1942, Hanuš was posted to No. 68 Squadron RAF, a Beaufighter night-fighter squadron whose "B" Flight consisted overwhelmingly of Czechoslovak airmen. But Hanuš got on badly with the flight commander, Squadron Leader Vlastimil Veselý. On 10 January 1943 Hanuš and his radar operator, Pilot Officer Ernest Eyles, were posted to take part in the North African Campaign. Later Hanuš had a different radar operator, Flying Officer H. Finlay.

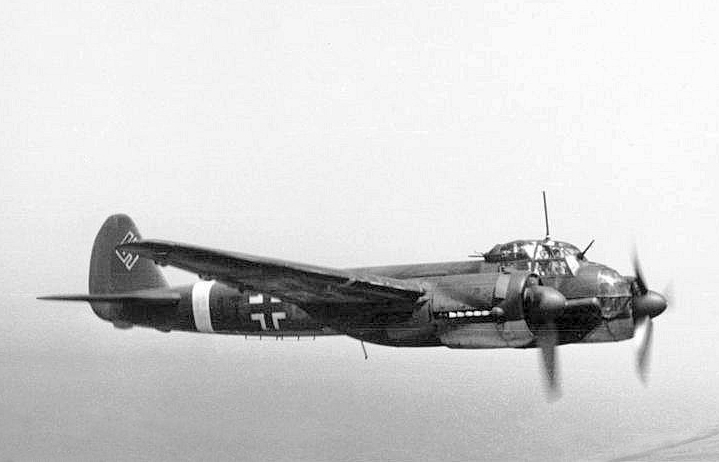
In 1943 in North Africa, Malta and Italy, Hanuš shot down four Junkers Ju 88 aircraft.

On 13 May, the remaining German and Italian forces in North Africa surrendered. On 20 May 1943, Hanuš was awarded the Distinguished Flying Cross. He continued to serve in Malta, the Allied invasion of Sicily and the Italian Campaign.

In his service in North Africa, Malta and Italy, Hanuš flew 79 combat sorties and amassed 225 flying hours. He shot down four Luftwaffe Junkers Ju 88 aircraft and damaged a Dornier Do 217. On 23 October, he was promoted to squadron leader and on 1 November he was given command of "A" Flight.

=== Liaison officer ===
On 5 December 1943, Hanuš was transferred to the Inspectorate-General of the Czechoslovak Air Force in London. He wanted to return to flying duties, but instead spent the rest of the war as a liaison officer. His duties included attending funerals of Czechoslovak airmen who had been killed in action, and visiting airfields to restore good relations where there had been discord between Czechoslovaks and locals.

On 6 May 1944 in Cambridge, Hanuš married a British woman, Lilian Evelyn Webb. Their first child, a daughter, was born in January 1945.

== After the war ==
The RAFVR's Czechoslovak contingent returned to liberated Czechoslovakia in August 1945. Hanuš returned on 22 August with the rank of lieutenant-colonel. He wanted to be given command of the 106th Air Regiment, based at Chrudim in eastern Bohemia. Instead he was made a staff officer, first at the regional command in Prague and then at Ruzyně airbase. He had a brief posting to the air force command in Brno in Moravia. On 1 October 1946, Hanuš was made Chief of Staff at the Anti-Air Defence Headquarters.

In February 1948, the Czechoslovak Communist Party seized power. Shortly after the coup, Hanuš was made Chief of Staff at Air Force Command in Brno. But the Communists soon started a political purge of armed services personnel who had served with the Western Allies. On 14 April, Hanuš was placed on enforced leave.

Lilian Hanušová was expecting their second child. Hanuš sent his wife and daughter back to Britain. On 3 May, he was arrested, accused of helping Major-General Karel Janoušek to try to escape abroad. Janoušek had been arrested on 30 April. By 6 May, Hanuš was one of 10 air force officers and 14 civilians being held in a prison controlled by the Obranné zpravodajství (OBZ) military and political intelligence organisation in the Hradčany district of Prague.

One source claims that Hanuš was then released without charge. Another states that he was tried and sentenced to two months in prison.

=== Second escape from Czechoslovakia ===
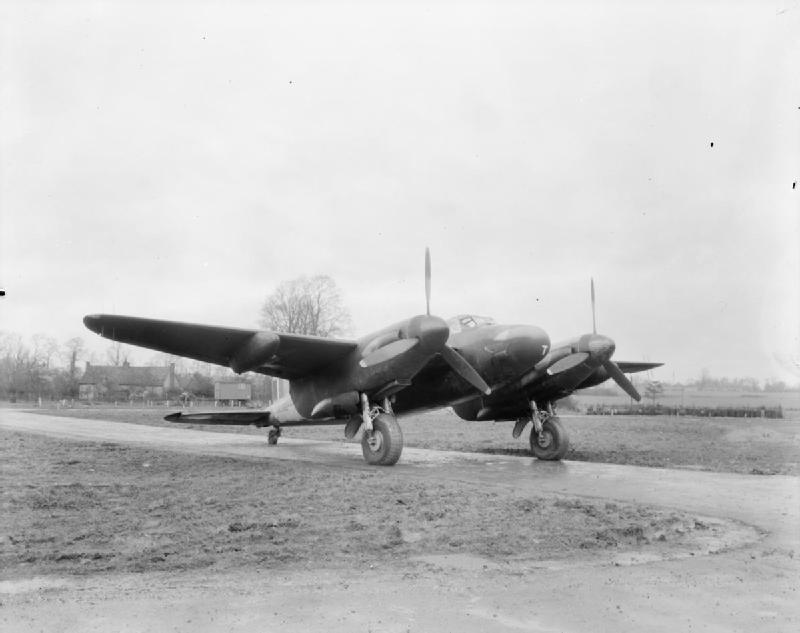
de Havilland Mosquito night fighter with nose radome for AI Mk. VIII radar

On 8 July 1948, Hanuš escaped from Czechoslovakia to the American zone of occupied Germany. He went from Bavaria via Wiesbaden airbase to Britain, where he rejoined the RAF.

On 1 December, Czechoslovakia dismissed Hanuš from the air force in absentia. He flew de Havilland Mosquito night fighters, first with No. 23 Squadron RAF and then with No. 141 Squadron RAF, until June 1951. He also flew Gloster Meteors which triggered his deafness which gradually deteriorated through the rest of his life. He continued his RAF career in non-flying duties, initially as an Air Traffic Controller and then as an Equipment Officer until 19 September 1968, when he retired. He then had a civilian career with International Computers Limited until he retired in 1977.

=== Rehabilitation ===
In November and December 1989, the Velvet Revolution ended Communist rule in Czechoslovakia. On 10 September 1991, the Czech and Slovak Federative Republic promoted Hanuš to colonel. In March 1992, it promoted him again, to major general.

But by then Hanuš was seriously ill. He died in England on 21 April.

== Honours and awards ==
Distinguished Flying Cross
1939–1945 Star with Battle of Britain clasp
Air Crew Europe Star with Atlantic clasp
Africa Star
Italy Star
Defence Medal
War Medal 1939–1945
Czechoslovak War Cross 1939–1945 three times
Československá medaile Za chrabrost před nepřítelem ("Bravery in Face of the Enemy") five times
Československá medaile za zásluhy, 1. stupně ("Medal of Merit, First Class")
Pamětní medaile československé armády v zahraničí ("Commemorative Medal of the Czechoslovak Army Abroad") with France, Great Britain and Middle East bars
Croix de guerre avec palme
