= Evelyn Faltis =

Czech composer

Evelyn Faltis (20 February 1887 – 13 May 1937) was a Czech composer.

== Life ==
Evelyn Faltis was born in Trutnov, Bohemia, in 1887, the second of three daughters of Carl Johann and Maria Anna Cecilia Magdalena Faltis (born Wiesenburg) who were Viennese bourgeoisie. She began her music studies at the Assomption convent in Paris and later studied at the Vienna Music Academy with Robert Fuchs and Eusebius Mandyczewski. She also studied at the Dresden Conservatory with Felix Draeseke and Eduard Reus, and in Munich with Sophie Menter.

After completing her studies she moved to Berlin, but settled in Vienna in 1933. She became the first female coach at Bayreuth and worked as an accompanist at the Nuremberg Stadttheater am Ring and the Darmstadt Hoftheater, and after 1924 at the Städtische Oper in Berlin. She died in Vienna of pneumonia.

== Works ==
Faltis composed for orchestra, chamber ensemble, instruments and chorus.

- Sonata in B minor for piano (no Op., about 1909)
- Piano Trio in D minor, Op. 1
- Fantastic symphony for orchestra, Op. 2a
- Hamlet symphonic poem, Op. 2b
- Piano Concerto, Op. 3
- Piano Trio in G minor, Op. 4
- Andante and Slavic Dance, Op 5. (Op. 5 was counted twice)
- Adagio for Violin and Piano, Op. 5 (Op. 5 was counted twice)
- Sonata in D minor for Violin and Piano, Op. 6
- Three songs for voice and piano, Op. 7 (1921)
  - 1. Träume (Dreams) - 2. Litanei (Litany) - 3. Nepomuk
- Seven Songs for Voice and Piano, Op. 8 (1921)
  - 1. Volksweise (Folksong) - 2. Golka - 3. Rosentage (Days of Roses) - 4. Lied der Tänzerin (Song of the Dancer) - 5. Liebeslied (Love Song) - 6. Vigilie (Vigil) - 7. Nebel (Fog)
- Anrufung: Welche Wege soll ich schreiten (Invocation: Which way should I proceed) for eight-part mixed chorus a capella, Text: Hans Ossenbach, Op. 9 (publ. 1929)
- Six Songs for Voice and Piano, Op. 10 (publ. 1921)
  - 1. Warum (Why) - 2. Komm heim (Come home) - 3. Hymne (Hymn) - 4. Libussa - 5. Die Ratlose (The Baffled One) - 6. An den Mond (To the Moon)
- Two sacred songs, Op. 11
- Fantasy and Double Fugue with "Dies Irae" for organ, Op. 12 (publ. 1922)
- Six Gypsy Songs, Op. 13 (publ. 1921)
  - 1. Auftrag (Order) - 2. Die Verliebten (The Lovers) - 3. Abschied (Farewell) - 4. Kolednika - 5. Bräutchens Garten (Bride Garden) - 6. Die Verlassene (The Abandoned)
- String Quartet, Op. 13a
- Mass with organ, Op. 13b
- Two songs for voice and piano, Op. 14 (publ. 1931)
  - 1. Traum (Dream) - 2. Der Kirschbaum (The Cherry Tree)
- String Quartet, Op. 15
- Lieder fernen Gedenkens (Songs of distant memory) for voice and piano, Op. post. (publ. 1939)
  - 1. Unklarheit (Obscurity) - 2. Zeig mir dein wahres Bild (Show Me Your True Image) - 3. Sprich (Say) - 4. Heimkehr (Homecoming)
