= Pepa Lábus =

Czech singer-songwriter (born 1968)

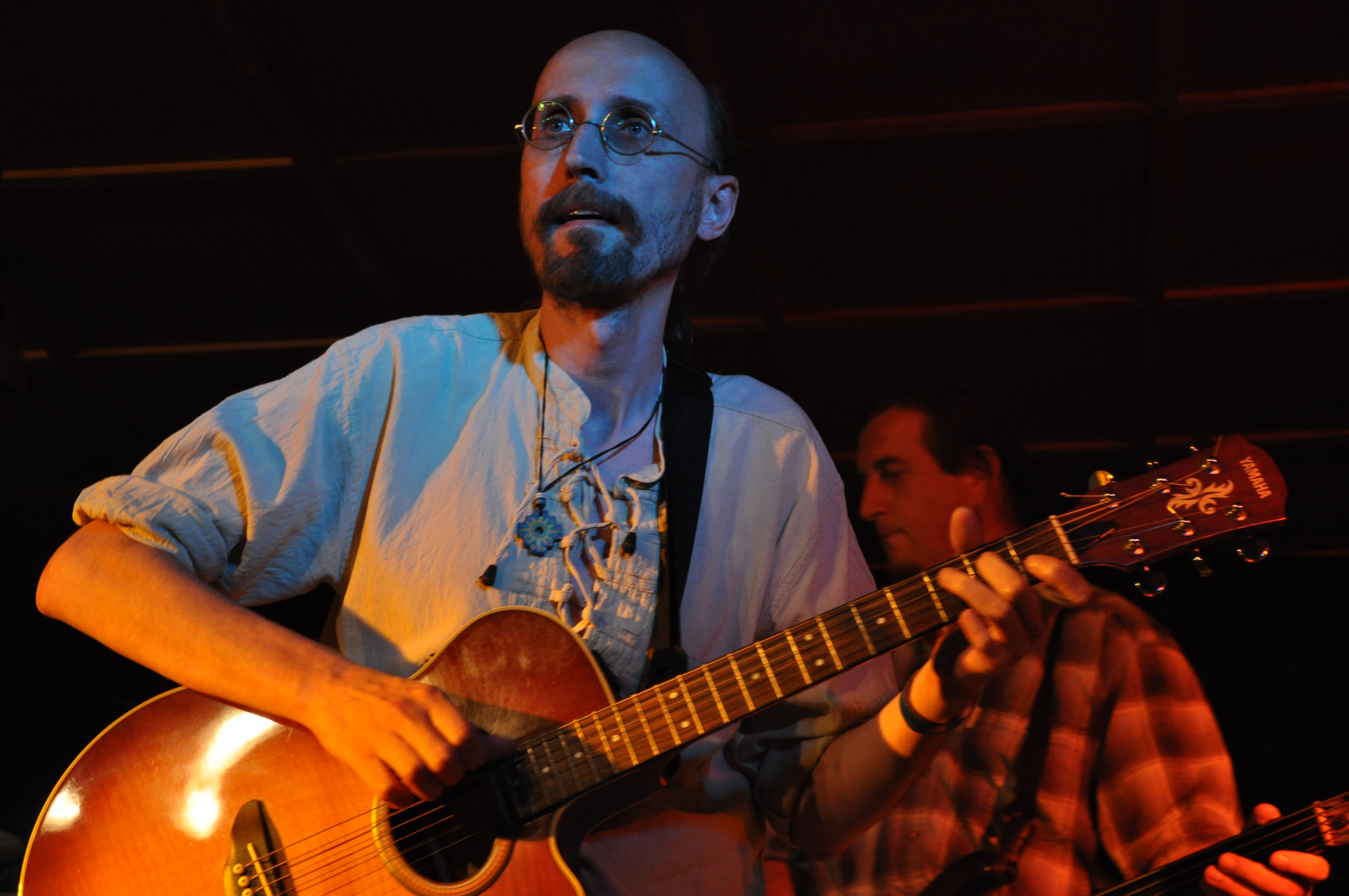
- Pepa Lábus (2011)

Background information
- Born: Josef Lábus; 15 December 1968 (age 57); Trutnov, Czechoslovakia
- Genres: Folk rock
- Occupation: Singer-songwriter
- Instrument: Guitar
- Years active: 1984–present
- Labels: Indies Records, Lenkow Records
- Website: pepalabus.cz

Pepa Lábus (born 15 December 1968 in Trutnov) is a Czech singer-songwriter. He started his career in 1984 as a folk musician. In 1996, he released the first album Morana as a solo artist and next year, he was joined by violinist Slávek Forman and bassist Tomáš Nýdrle and they performed as a trio under the name Pepa Lábus a Spol. His most recent album Délka vteřiny was released in 2012. He is also lyricist for other artists, such as Luboš Pospíšil. He is also a radio presenter on Radio Beat station.

== Discography ==
- Morana (1996)
- Zrcadlo Mistra Matyáše (1999)
- Bezčasá a nehnutá (2002)
- Vzlétají ptáci (2006)
- Délka vteřiny (2012)
- Uzamčená brána (2022)
