= Goran Labus =

Serbian footballer

Personal information
- Full name: Goran Labus
- Date of birth: 28 April 1985 (age 41)
- Place of birth: Novi Sad, SFR Yugoslavia
- Height: 1.92 m (6 ft 4 in)
- Position: Goalkeeper

Senior career*
Years	Team	Apps	(Gls)
2002–2006	Novi Sad	1	(0)
2005–2006	→ Fruškogorac (loan)		
2006–2007	Metalac Futog		
2007–2008	BSK Borča	0	(0)
2008–2009	Srem	10	(0)
2009–2010	ČSK Čelarevo	32	(0)
2010–2013	Spartak Subotica	1	(0)
2011–2012	→ Zvijezda Gradačac (loan)	10	(0)
2013–2014	OFK Jugović Kać		
2014	Bačka Palanka	2	(0)
- * Club domestic league appearances and goals

Goran Labus (Serbian Cyrillic: Горан Лабус; born 28 April 1985) is a Serbian retired football goalkeeper.
