= Labus (wasp) =

Scientific classification
- Kingdom: Animalia
- Phylum: Arthropoda
- Class: Insecta
- Order: Hymenoptera
- Family: Vespidae
- Subfamily: Eumeninae
- Genus: Labus; Saussure, 1867

Type species
- Labus spiniger Saussure, 1867

Species
- See text

Genus of wasps

Labus is an Indomalayan genus of potter wasps. It contains the following species:

- Labus angularis Vecht, 1935
- Labus armatus (Cameron, 1900)
- Labus bekilyensis Giordani Soika, 1941
- Labus clypeatus Vecht, 1935
- Labus crassinoda (Cameron, 1910)
- Labus exiguus (Saussure, 1855)
- Labus humbertianus Saussure, 1867
- Labus lofuensis Giordani Soika, 1973
- Labus madecassus Schulthess, 1907
- Labus maindroni Buysson, 1906
- Labus philippinensis Giordani Soika, 1968
- Labus postpetiolatus Gusenleitner, 1988
- Labus pusillus Vecht, 1963
- Labus rufomaculatus Vecht, 1963
- Labus spiniger Saussure, 1867
- Labus sumatrensis Giordani Soika, 1991
- Labus vandervechti Giordani Soika, 1960
