= Jaroslav Havlíček =

Czech novelist (1896–1943)

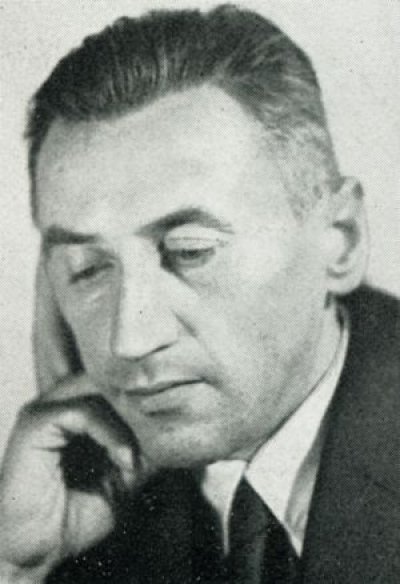
- A portrait of Jaroslav Havlíček
- Born: 3 February 1896; Jilemnice, Austria-Hungary
- Died: 7 April 1943 (aged 47); Prague, Protectorate of Bohemia and Moravia
- Occupation: Novelist

Jaroslav Havlíček (3 February 1896 – 7 April 1943) was a Czech novelist. He was an exponent of naturalism and psychological novel in Czech literature.

== Life ==
Jaroslav Havlíček was born in a teacher's family in Jilemnice, Liberec Region. He studied gymnasium in Jičín and then courses of commercial economics. Shortly after he entered ČVUT he was drafted to serve in the Austrian army in Kadaň from where he soon went to front (Russia, Italy). After World War I he finished his studies and became an official. He married Marie Krausová, daughter to a Jilemnice soapmaker, in 1921. He is father to Zbyněk Havlíček.

== Work ==
His novels are usually situated to a provincial town with clear signs of Jilemnice at the turn of the 20th century.

== Notable works ==
- "Petrolejové lampy" (Kerosene Lamps): Initially titled "Vyprahlé touhy" (Dead Longings) in 1935, this novel is considered Havlíček's masterpiece. It portrays the life of a woman trapped in a challenging marriage, highlighting the societal pressures of the time.
- "Neviditelný" (The Invisible): A psychological novel that delves into the mind of its protagonist, examining themes of obsession and mental instability.
- "Helimadoe": This work focuses on the lives of five sisters, offering a deep exploration of family dynamics and individual aspirations.
