= Trutnov =

Town in the Hradec Králové Region, Czech Republic

- Town
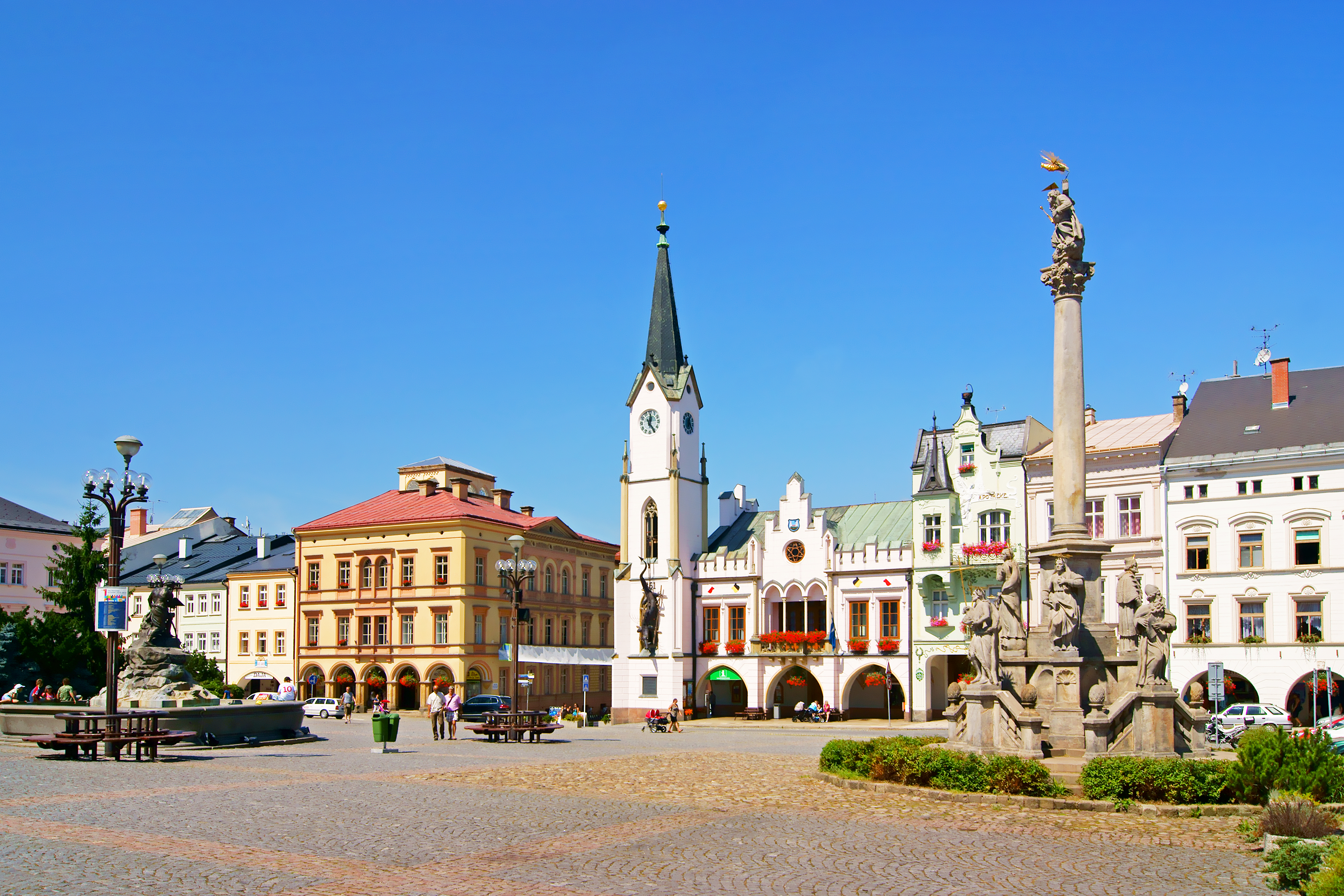
- Krakonošovo náměstí, the historic centre

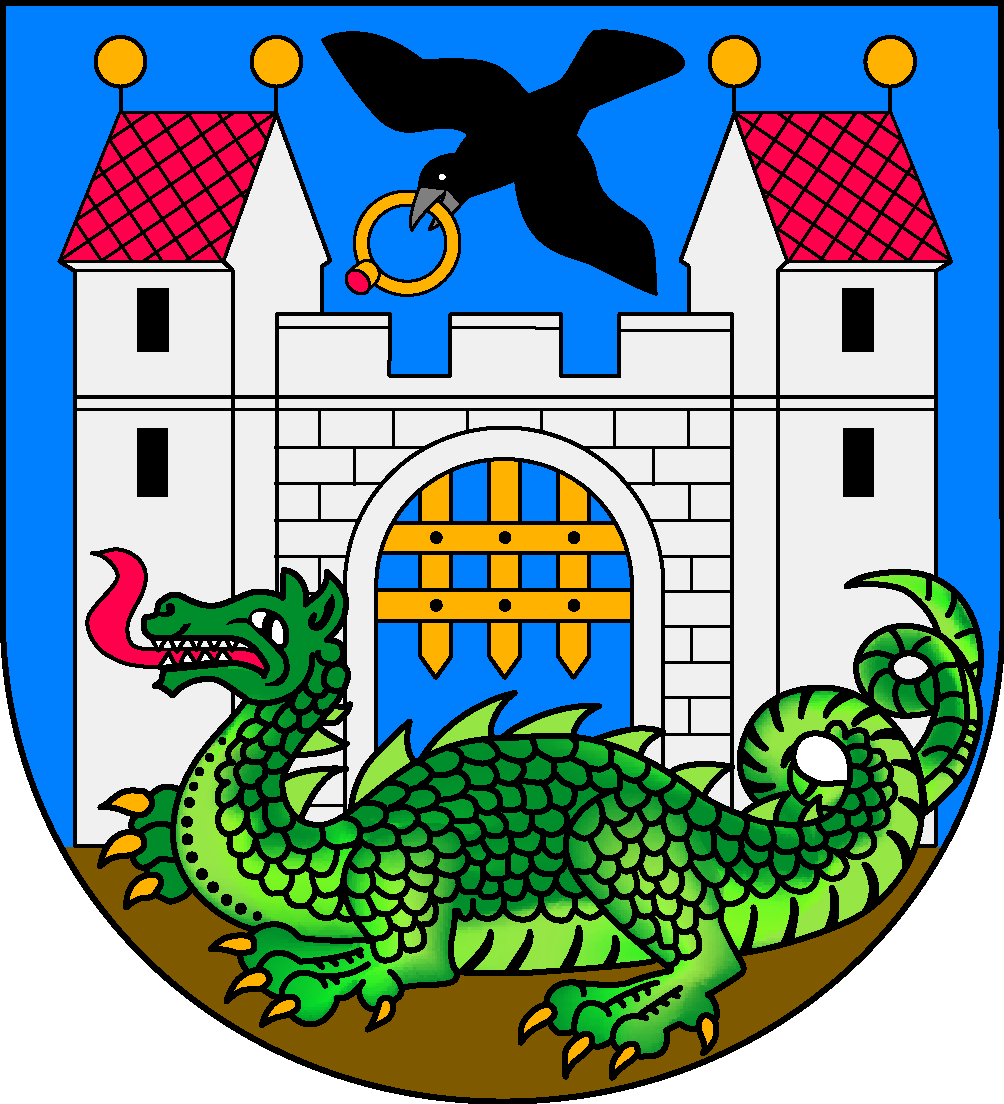
- Flag Coat of arms

- Location in the Czech Republic
- Coordinates: 50°33′38″N 15°54′47″E
- Country: Czech Republic
- Region: Hradec Králové
- District: Trutnov
- First mentioned: 1260

Government
  - Mayor: Michal Rosa (ODS)

Area
  - Total: 103.32 km^{2} (39.89 sq mi)
- Elevation: 414 m (1,358 ft)

Population (2026-01-01)
  - Total: 29,337
  - Density: 283.94/km^{2} (735.41/sq mi)
- Time zone: UTC+1 (CET)
  - Summer (DST): UTC+2 (CEST)
- Postal code: 541 01
- Website: www.trutnov.cz

Trutnov (Czech pronunciation: [ˈtrutnof]; German: Trautenau) is a town in the Hradec Králové Region of the Czech Republic. It has about 29,000 inhabitants. The town is situated in a hilly landscape on the Úpa River. In the 15th and 16th centuries, Trutnov was a dowry town of the Bohemian queens. The historic town centre is well preserved and is protected as an urban monument zone.

== Administrative division ==
Trutnov consists of 21 municipal parts (in brackets population according to the 2021 census):

- Dolní Předměstí (2,491)
- Dolní Staré Město (566)
- Horní Předměstí (3,936)
- Horní Staré Město (7,312)
- Kryblice (2,945)
- Střední Předměstí (5,915)
- Vnitřní Město (1,187)
- Adamov (74)
- Babí (124)
- Bohuslavice (122)
- Bojiště (288)
- Lhota (155)
- Libeč (303)
- Nový Rokytník (53)
- Oblanov (131)
- Poříčí (1,946)
- Starý Rokytník (375)
- Střítež (98)
- Studenec (84)
- Volanov (546)
- Voletiny (403)

The urban core is formed by Dolní Předměstí, Dolní Staré Město, Horní Předměstí, Horní Staré Město, Kryblice, Střední Předměstí and Vnitřní Město.

== Etymology ==
Both the German name Trautenau and the Czech name Trutnov are derived from the Old German truten ouwe, which meant "cute floodplain".

== Geography ==
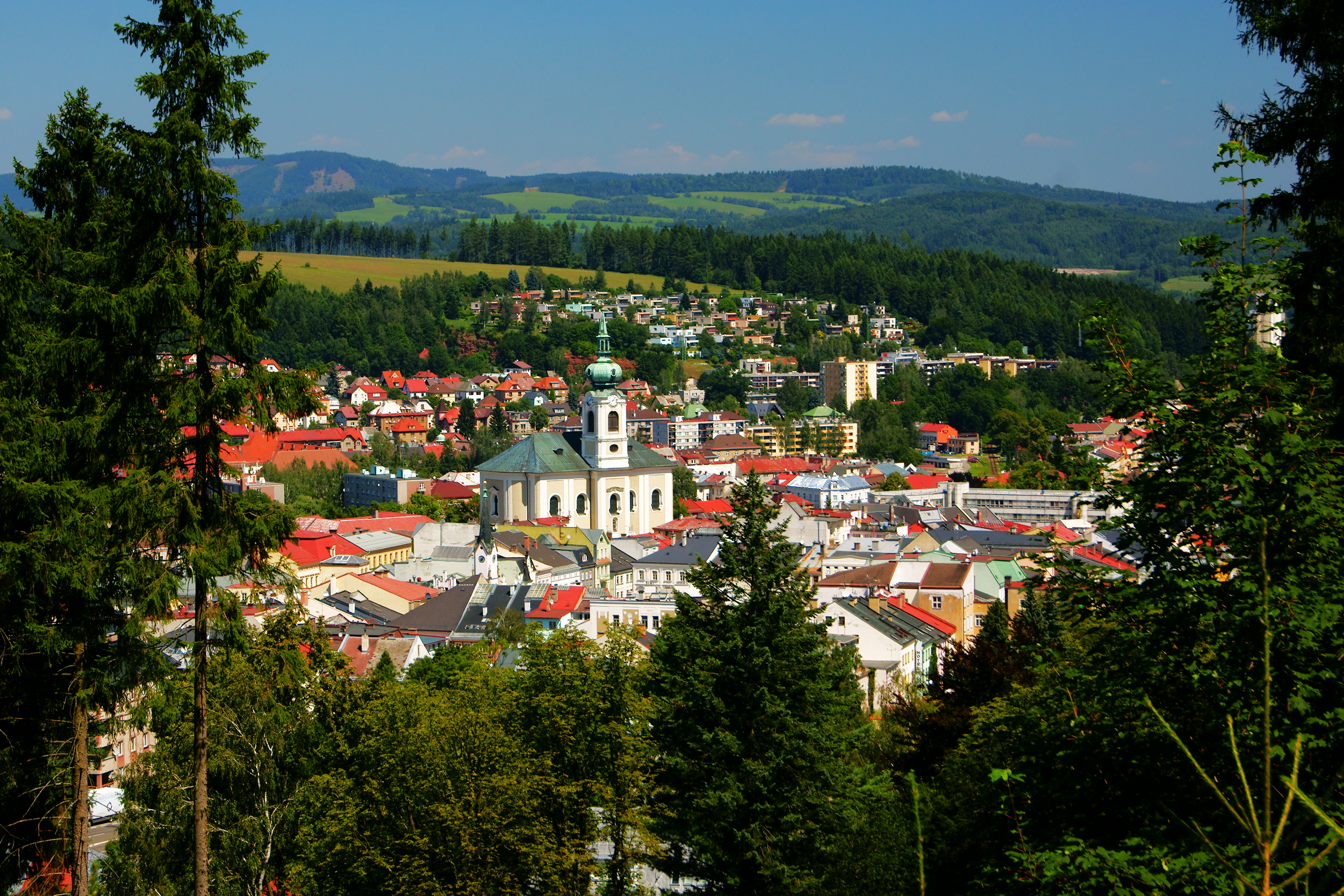
General view with Church of the Nativity of the Virgin Mary

Trutnov is located about 39 kilometres (24 mi) north of Hradec Králové. A negligible part of the municipal territory borders Poland. Most of the territory of Trutnov lies in the Giant Mountains Foothills, but it also extends to the Broumov Highlands on the east and a small northern part extends into the Giant Mountains. The highest point is a contour line on the slopes of the Dvorský les Mountain at 965 m (3,166 ft) above sea level. The town proper is situated in the valley of the Úpa River.

== History ==
The first written mention of Trutnov is from 1260. It was founded around 1250 by the Švábenský of Švábenice noble family and originally named Úpa after the eponymous river. In 1301, King Wenceslaus II bought the whole area, already called Trutnov. From 1400 to 1599, Trutnov was a dowry town of the Bohemian queens. In 1421, the town was captured by Jan Žižka during the Hussite Wars.

Trutnov was the site of the Battle of Trautenau in 1866 during the Austro-Prussian War.

During World War II, the German occupiers operated three forced labour camps for Jewish women, located in Horní Staré Město, Poříčí and Libeč, which all became subcamps of the Gross-Rosen concentration camp in March 1944, and a forced labour subcamp of the Stalag VIII-B/344 prisoner-of-war camp for Allied POWs in Libeč. After the war, the remaining German population was expelled in 1945 in accordance with the Potsdam Agreement.

== Demographics ==
Historical population

Year	Pop.	±%
1869	18,289	—
1880	22,391	+22.4%
1890	25,407	+13.5%
1900	27,561	+8.5%
1910	29,786	+8.1%

Year	Pop.	±%
1921	26,412	−11.3%
1930	28,329	+7.3%
1950	21,030	−25.8%
1961	25,214	+19.9%
1970	26,046	+3.3%

Year	Pop.	±%
1980	29,506	+13.3%
1991	31,999	+8.4%
2001	31,997	−0.0%
2011	30,312	−5.3%
2021	29,054	−4.2%

Source: Censuses

== Economy ==
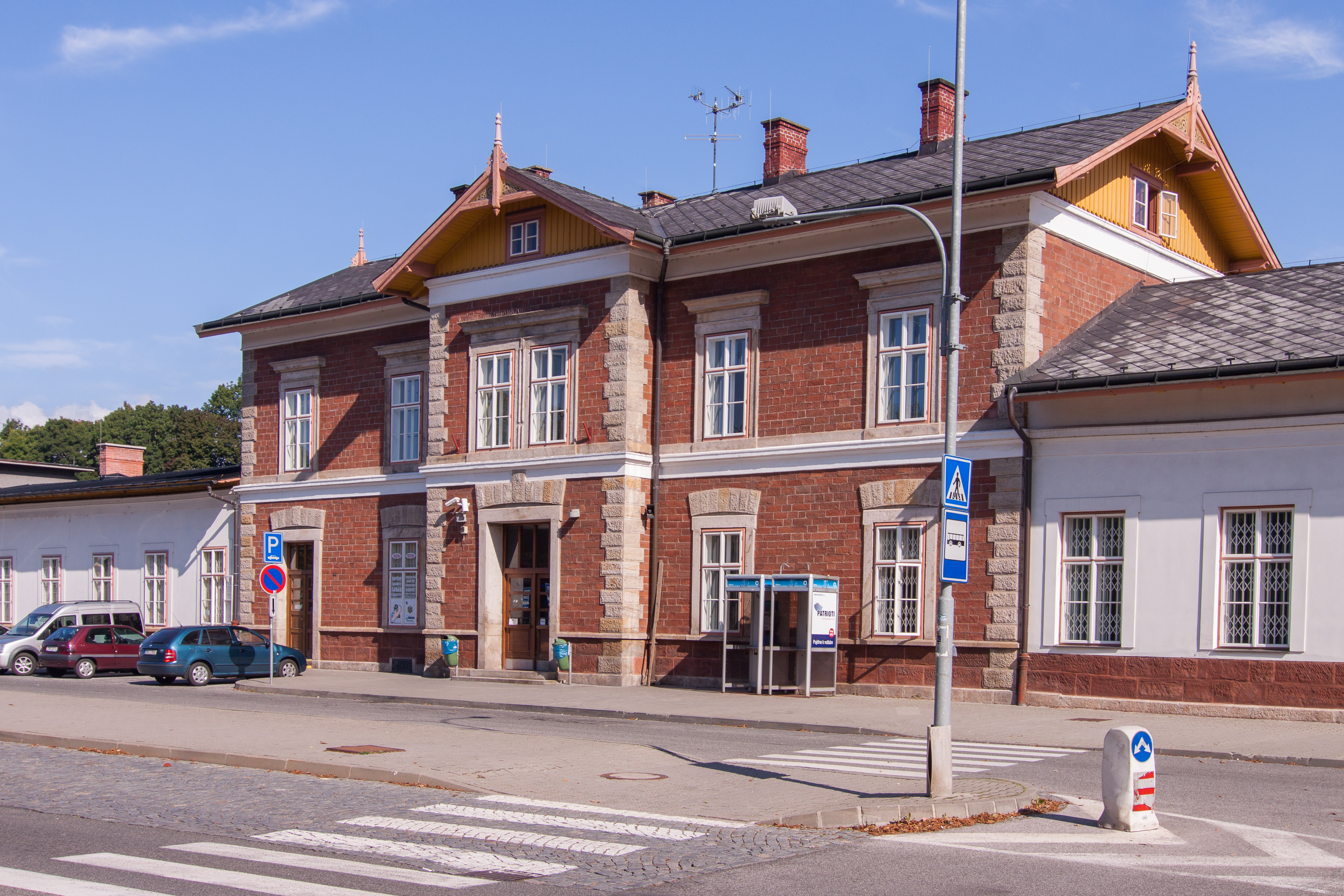
Main train station

The largest employers based in the town are Vitesco Technologies Czech Republic and Tyco Electronics EC Trutnov, both manufacturers of electrical equipment for the automotive industry with more than 1,000 employees. The largest non-industrial employer is the Trutnov hospital.

The Krakonoš Brewery was founded in 1582 and is one of the oldest breweries in the country.

== Transport ==
Trutnov is the terminus of an interregional railway line from Prague. There are also railway lines heading from Trutnov to Kolín and Vrchlabí.

== Sport ==
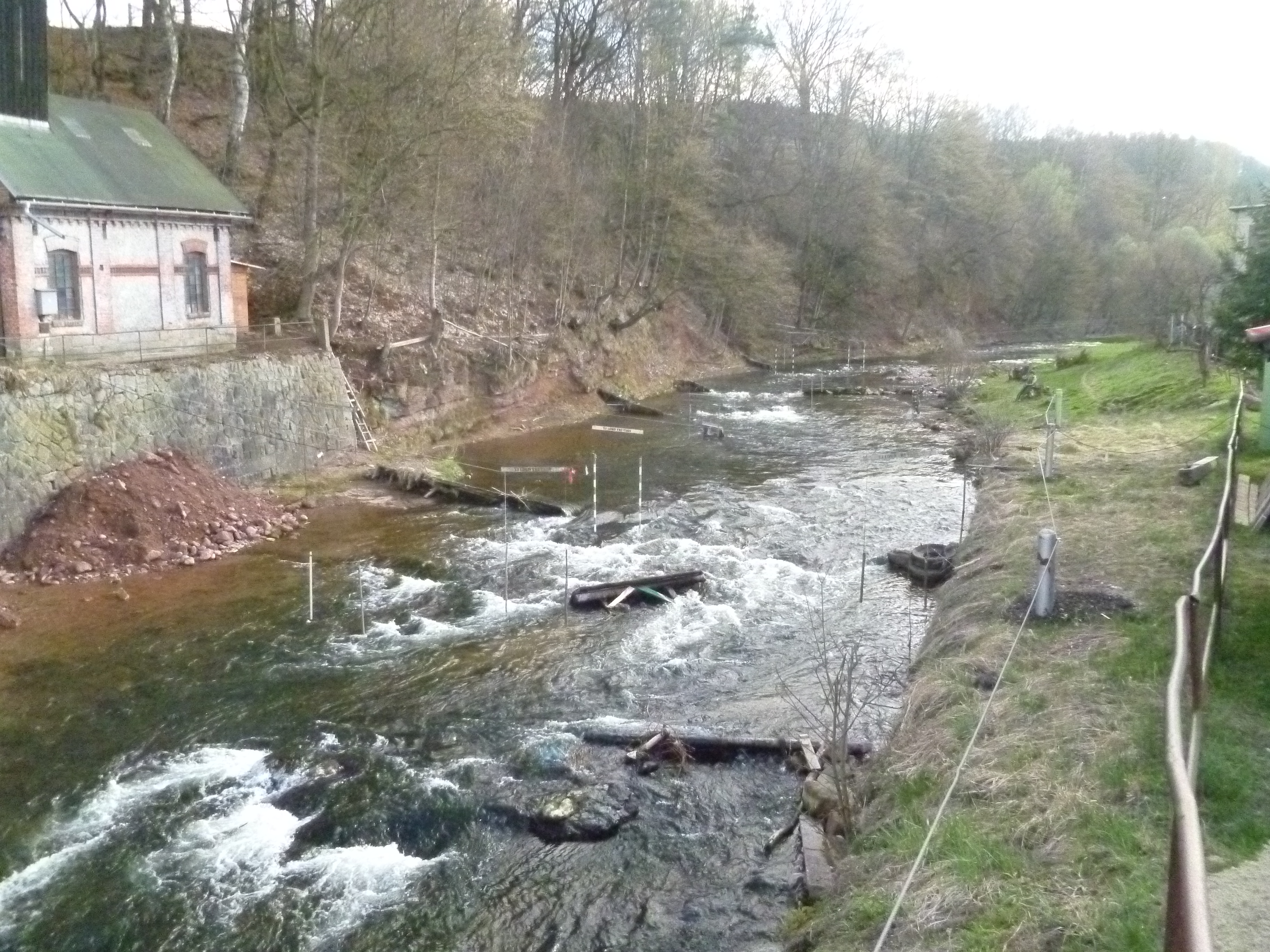
Slalom course on the Úpa River

The ice hockey team HC Trutnov is based in the town.

There is a slalom course on the Úpa River in Trutnov. The Trutnovské slalomy competition has been held here every year since 1965.

== Culture ==
Trutnov has hosted the Trutnov Open Air Music Festival since 1990 and, since 1999, has hosted the Obscene Extreme metal festival.

== Sights ==
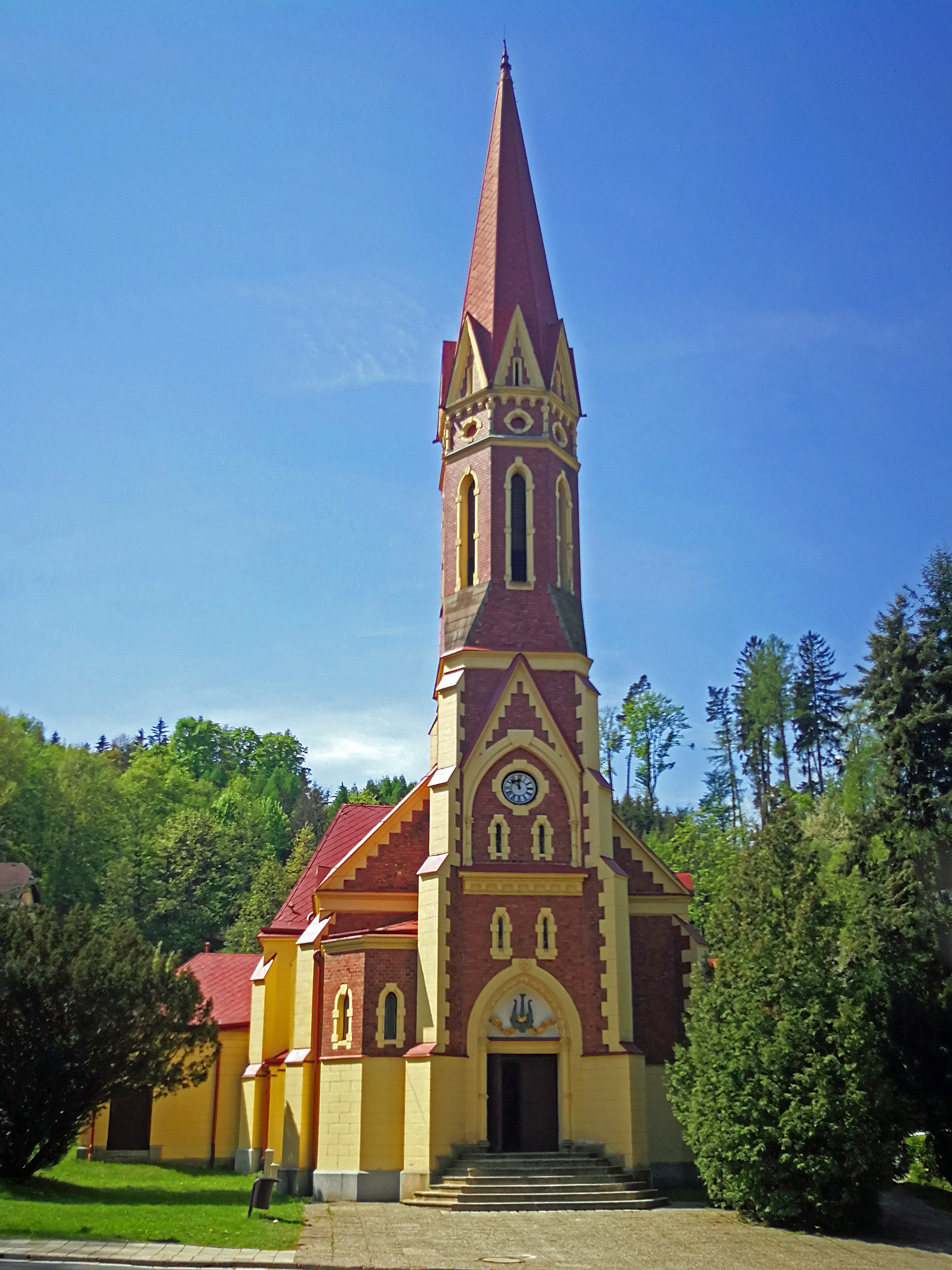
Former Lutheran church

The historic core comprises the area of Vnitřní Město part of Trutnov, with the square Krakonošovo náměstí in its centre. The area was delimited by town walls in the 14th century. Their fragments are preserved to this day. The main landmark of the square is the neo-Gothic Old Town Hall, nowadays the tourist information centre. In the middle of the square are a statue of Emperor Joseph II, a stone fountain with a statue of Krakonoš, and the Baroque Holy Trinity Column from 1704.

The most valuable buildings of Trutnov are the three churches. The Church of the Nativity of the Virgin Mary is a Neoclassical building with late Baroque elements, built in 1756–1782. The Church of Saint Wenceslaus in Horní Staré Město part of Trutnov was first documented already in 1313. In 1581, it was rebuilt in the Renaissance style, and the tower was added. The Church of Saints Peter and Paul is located in Poříčí and was built in the neo-Gothic style in 1897–1903.

The Bohuslav Martinů Concert Hall, named in honour of Bohuslav Martinů, is located in the former Lutheran church. The church was built in the neo-Gothic style in 1900.

== Twin towns – sister cities ==
Trutnov is twinned with:

- Kamienna Góra, Poland
- Kępno, Poland
- Lohfelden, Germany
- Senica, Slovakia
- Strzelin, Poland
- Świdnica, Poland
- Würzburg, Germany

== Notable people ==
- Samuel Fritz (1654 – c. 1730), Jesuit missionary who made the first accurate map of the Amazon River
- Vincenz Czerny (1842–1916), surgeon
- Igo Etrich (1879–1967), Austrian flight pioneer
- Friedrich Hopfner (1881–1949), Austrian geodesist and geophysicist
- Evelyn Faltis (1887–1937), composer
- Elsa Hilger (1904–2005), American cellist
- Helen Lewis (1916–2009), dance teacher and choreographer
- Norbert Eimer (1940–2021), German politician
- Iris Gusner (born 1941), German film director and screenwriter
- Pepa Lábus (born 1968), singer-songwriter
- Karel Sedláček (born 1979), darts player
- Rudolf Skácel (born 1979), footballer
- Eva Vrabcová-Nývltová (born 1986), athlete
- Marcela Krůzová (born 1990), footballer
- Šárka Musilová (born 1991), Paralympic archer
