= Saint Lawrence =

Early Christian deacon of Rome and martyr

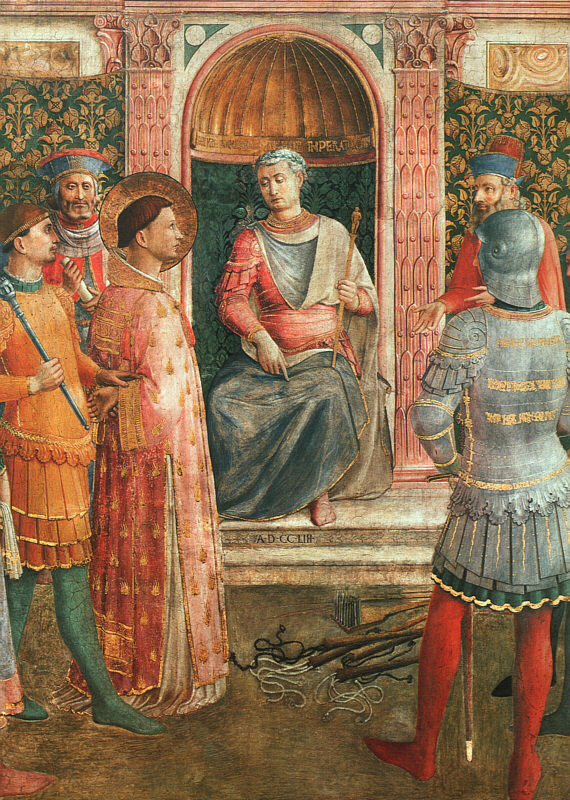
- Panel of Scenes from the Life of St. Laurence in the Niccoline Chapel, c. 1450

Martyr
- Born: 31 December 225; Huesca or less likely Valencia, Hispania (modern-day Spain)
- Died: 10 August AD 258 (aged 32); Rome
- Venerated in: Catholic Church; Eastern Orthodoxy; Anglican Communion; Lutheranism
- Canonized: Pre-congregation
- Major shrine: Basilica di San Lorenzo fuori le Mura in Rome
- Feast: 10 August
- Attributes: Usually holding a gridiron and wearing a dalmatic
- Patronage: 1) People: those who work with open fires (cooks, bakers, brewers, textile cleaners, tanners), those to whom fire means harm (librarians, archivists, miners, poor people), and comedians 2) Localities: Rome and Grosseto and Villanovafranca (Italy), Rotterdam (Netherlands), Huesca (Spain), San Lawrenz, Gozo, and Birgu (Malta), Barangay San Lorenzo, San Pablo, Laguna, Balagtas, Bulacan, Balangiga, Eastern Samar, and Mexico, Pampanga (Philippines), Canada, Colombo City (Sri Lanka)

Saint Lawrence or Laurence (Latin: Laurentius, lit. 'laurelled'; 31 December 225 – 10 August 258) was one of the seven deacons of the city of Rome under Pope Sixtus II who were martyred in the persecution of the Christians ordered by the Roman emperor Valerian in 258.

== Life ==
Lawrence is thought to have been born on 31 December AD 225, in Huesca (or, less probably, in Valencia), the town from which his parents came in the later region of Aragon, which was then part of the Roman province of Hispania Tarraconensis. The martyrs Orentius (Modern Spanish: San Orencio) and Patientia (Modern Spanish: Santa Paciencia) are traditionally held to have been his parents.

Lawrence encountered the future Pope Sixtus II, a famous teacher born in Greece, in Caesaraugusta (Zaragoza), and they travelled together from Hispania to Rome. When Sixtus became the pope in 257, he ordained the young Lawrence, who was only 32, as a deacon, and later appointed him as Archdeacon of Rome, the first among the seven deacons who served in the cathedral church. This was a position of great trust which included the care of the treasury and riches of the Church and the distribution of alms to the poor.

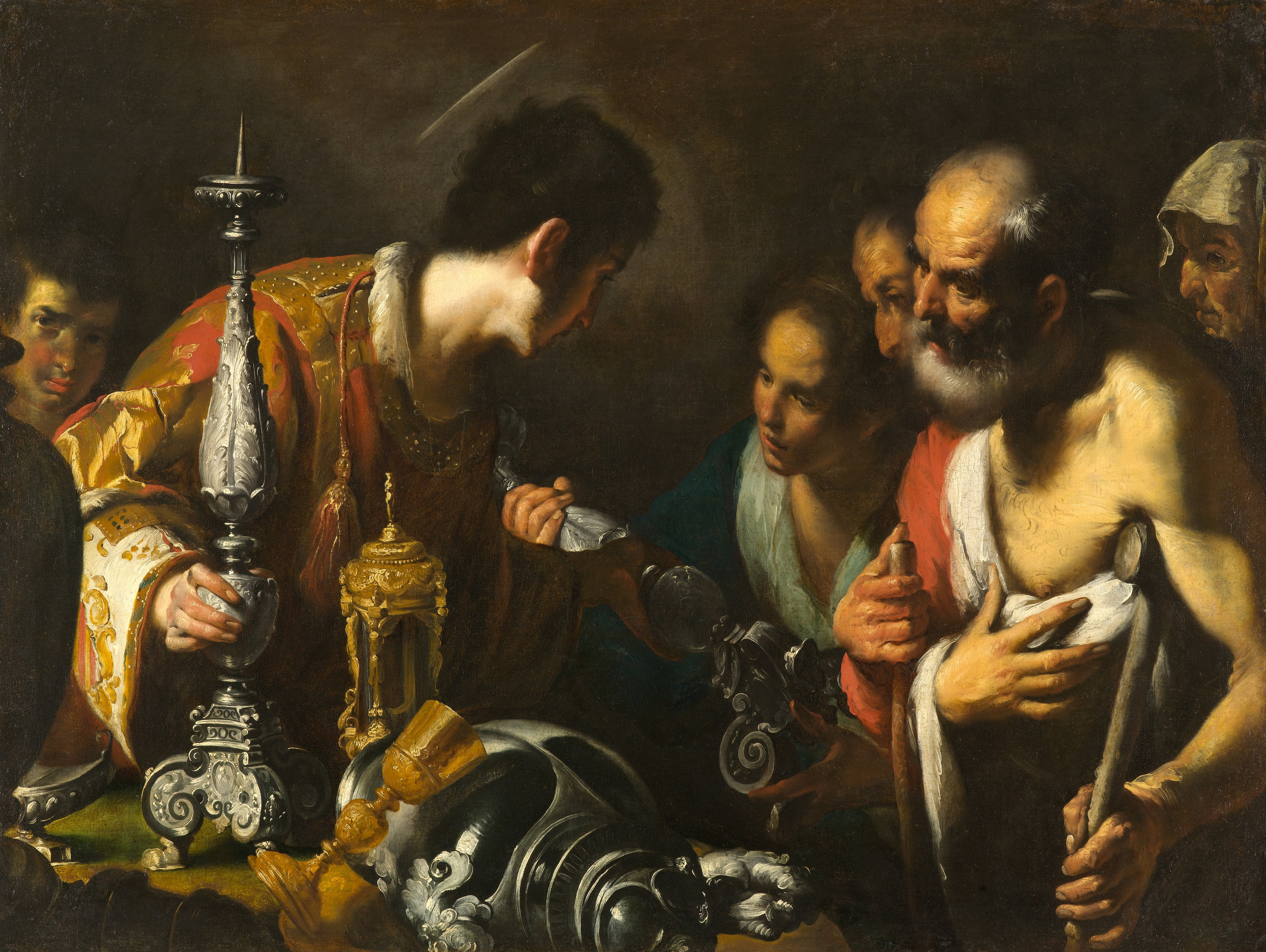
St. Lawrence Distributing the Treasures of the Church by Bernardo Strozzi

St. Cyprian, Bishop of Carthage, noted that at the time the norm was that Christians who were denounced were executed and all their goods confiscated by the Imperial treasury. At the beginning of August 258, the Emperor Valerian issued an edict that all bishops, priests, and deacons should immediately be put to death. Pope Sixtus II was captured on 6 August 258, at the cemetery of St. Callixtus, while celebrating the liturgy, and was executed immediately.

After the death of Sixtus, the prefect of Rome demanded that Lawrence turn over the riches of the Church, and St. Ambrose wrote that Lawrence asked for three days to gather the wealth. He worked swiftly to distribute as much Church property to the indigent as possible to prevent it from being seized by the prefect. On the third day, at the head of a small delegation, he presented himself to the prefect. When ordered to deliver the treasures of the Church, he presented the city's indigent, crippled, blind, and suffering, and declared that these were the true treasures of the Church: "Here are the treasures of the church. You see, the church is truly rich, far richer than your emperor!"

== Martyrdom ==
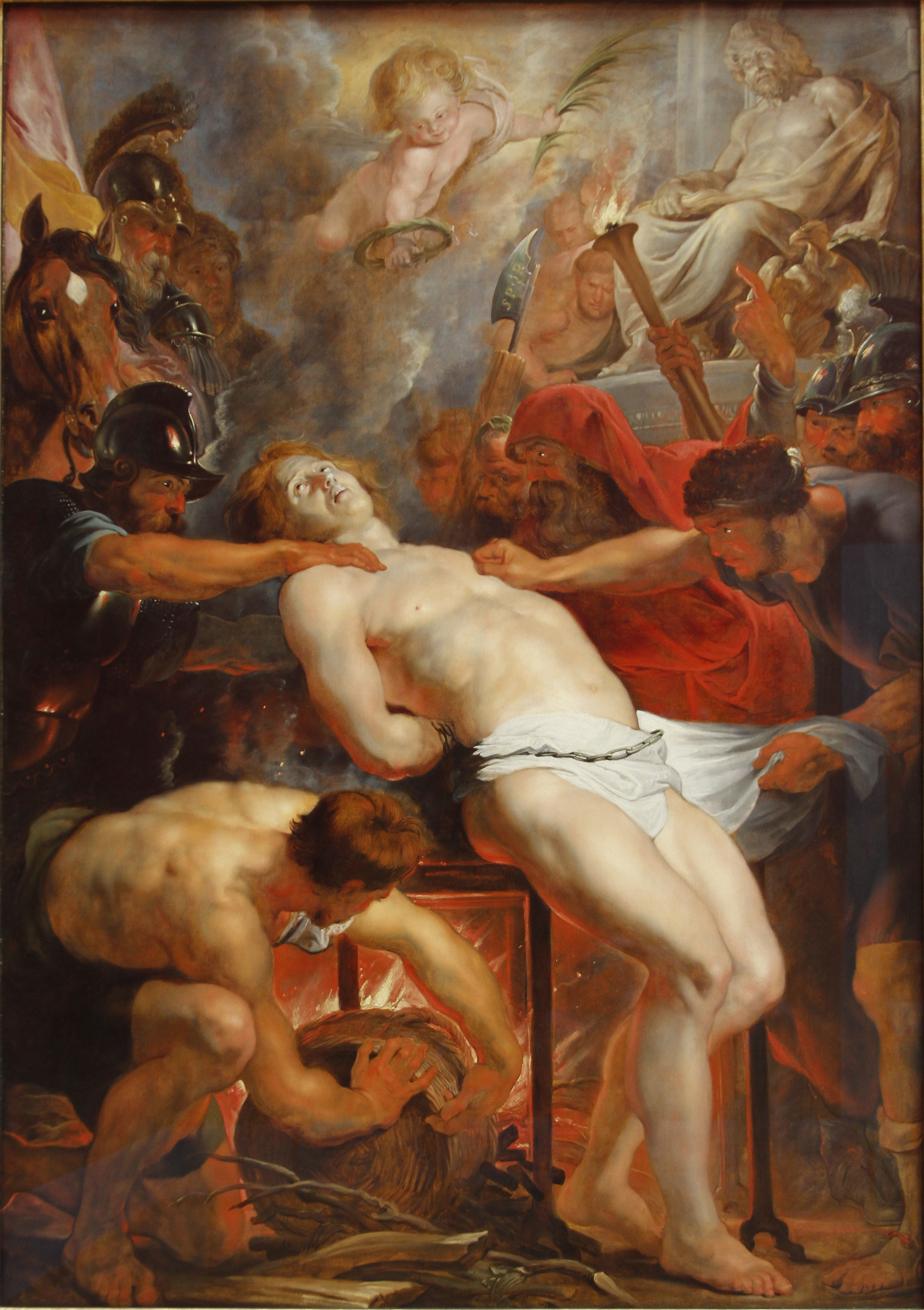
The Martyrdom of Saint Lawrence by Rubens (1614)

As a deacon in Rome, Lawrence was responsible for the material goods of the Church and the distribution of alms to the poor. Ambrose of Milan related that when the treasures of the Church were demanded of Lawrence by the prefect of Rome, he brought forward the poor, to whom he had distributed the treasure as alms. "Behold in these poor persons the treasures which I promised to show you; to which I will add pearls and precious stones, those widows and consecrated virgins, which are the Church's crown." The prefect was so angry that he had a great gridiron prepared with hot coals beneath it and had Lawrence placed on it, hence Lawrence's association with the gridiron.

Lawrence was sentenced at the Temple of Antoninus and Faustina and imprisoned in the house of the centurion Hippolytus (the site of which is now San Lorenzo in Fonte), where he baptized fellow prisoners. He was martyred on the Esquiline Hill, at a site which is now the church of San Lorenzo in Panisperna, and was buried in the Catacomb of Cyriaca on the Via Tiburtina, upon which has been built the Basilica Papale di San Lorenzo fuori le mura. The Almanac of Filocalus for 354 states that he was buried in the catacomb by Hippolytus and Justin the Confessor, a presbyter. One of the early sources for his martyrdom was the description of Aurelius Prudentius Clemens in his Peristephanon, Hymn 2.

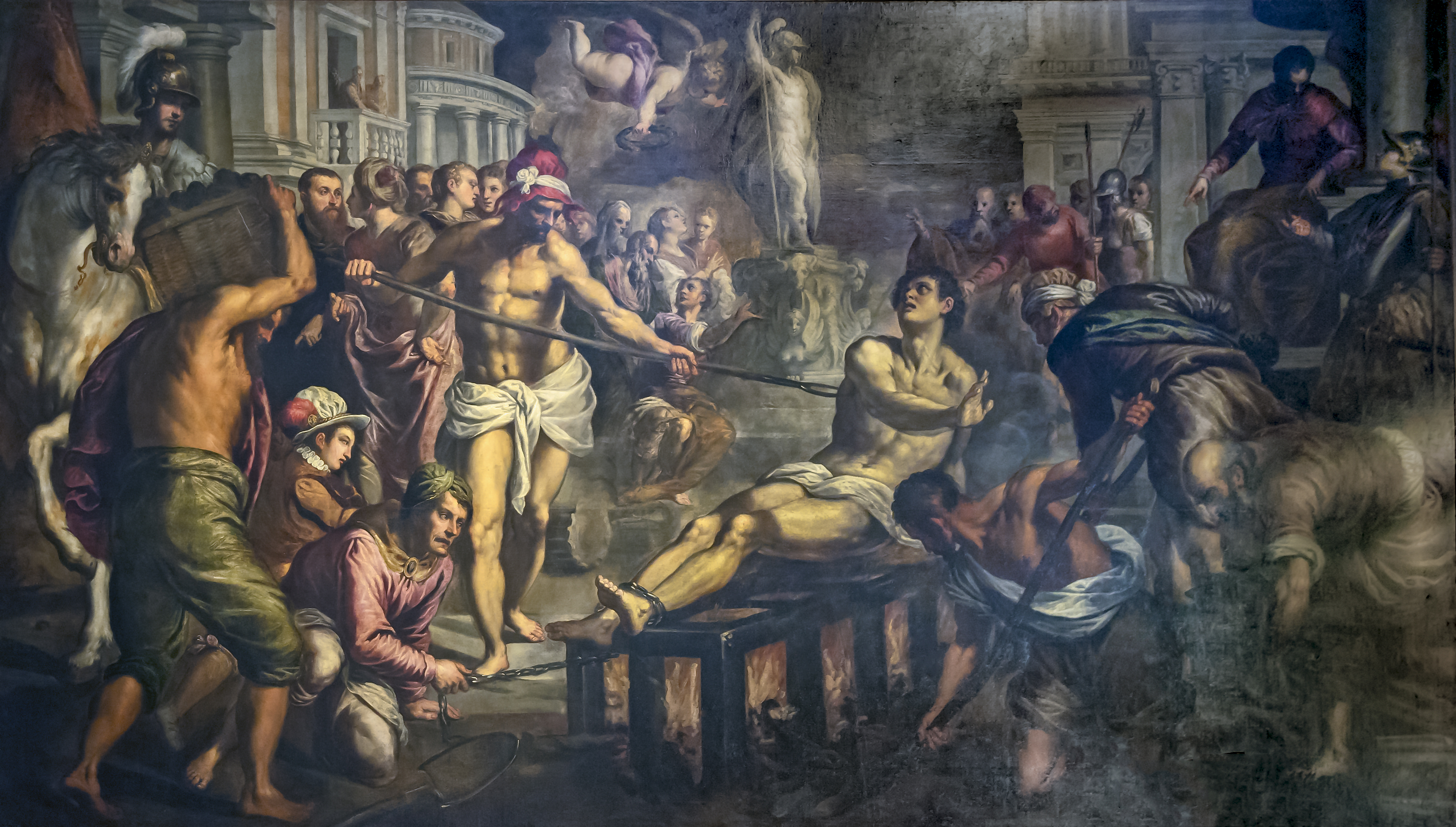
Martyrdom of San Lorenzo, by Palma il Giovane, in San Giacomo dall'Orio (Venice)

Despite the Church claiming to be in possession of the actual gridiron, historian Patrick J. Healy argues that the traditional account of how Lawrence was martyred is "not worthy of credence", as the slow, lingering death cannot be reconciled "with the express command contained in the edict regarding bishops, priests, and deacons (animadvertantur) which ordinarily meant decapitation". A theory of how the tradition arose is proposed that as the result of a mistake in transcription, the omission of the letter "p" – "by which the customary and solemn formula for announcing the death of a martyr – passus est ["he suffered," that is, was martyred] – was made to read assus est [he was roasted]." The Liber Pontificalis, which is held to draw from sources independent of the existing traditions and Acta regarding Lawrence, uses passus est concerning him, the same term it uses for Pope Sixtus II, who was martyred by decapitation during the same persecution four days earlier.

Emperor Constantine I is said to have erected a small oratory in honour of Lawrence, which was a station on the itineraries of the graves of the Roman martyrs by the seventh century. Pope Damasus I rebuilt or repaired the church, now the Basilica di San Lorenzo fuori le Mura, while the Minor Basilica of San Lorenzo in Panisperna was erected over the site of his martyrdom. The gridiron of the martyrdom was placed by Pope Paschal II in the Minor Basilica of San Lorenzo in Lucina.

== Associated Roman churches ==
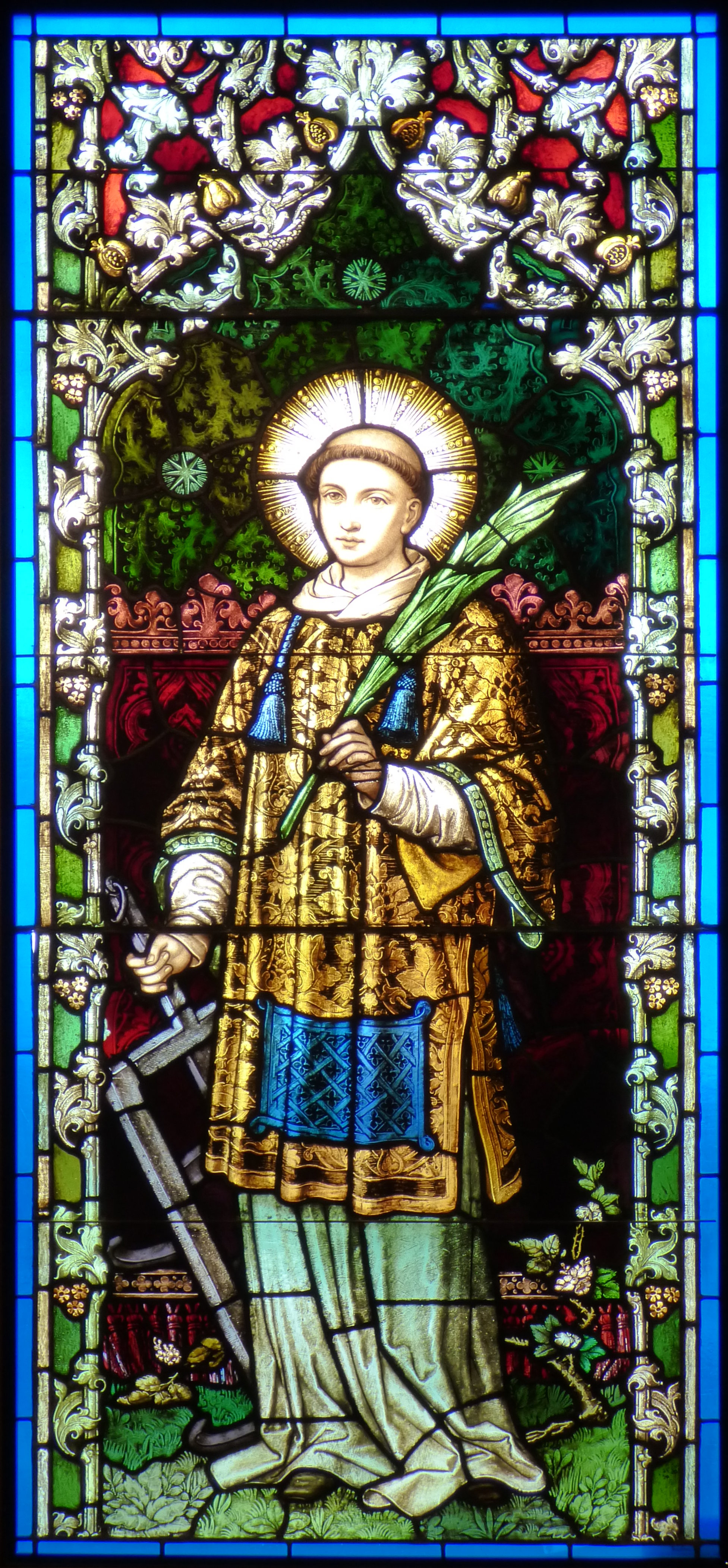
St. Lawrence in stained glass window by Franz Mayer & Co. He is holding a palm branch, a symbol of martyrdom, and a griddle, the instrument of his death.

The Roman Catholic Church erected six churches on the sites in Rome traditionally associated with his martyrdom:

- the Minor Basilica of St Lawrence in Damaso (Basilica Minore di San Lorenzo in Damaso), the site where he performed his duties as deacon of Rome;
- the Minor Basilica of St Mary in Domnica alla Navicella (Basilica Minore di Santa Maria in Domnica alla Navicella), the site where he customarily distributed alms to the poor;
- the annexed Church of St Lawrence in Miranda (Chiesa Annessa San Lorenzo de' Speziali in Miranda), the site of his sentencing and condemnation by the Prefect of Rome;
- the annexed Church of St Lawrence in Fonte (Chiesa Annessa San Lorenzo in Fonte), the site of his imprisonment by the centurion Ippolito and of the fountain in which he baptized his fellow prisoners;
- the Church of St Lawrence in Panisperna (Chiesa di San Lorenzo in Panisperna), the site of his actual martyrdom/death and the oven used to roast him to death; and
- the Papal Minor Basilica of St Lawrence outside the Walls (Basilica Minore Papale di San Lorenzo fuori le Mura), the site of his burial and sepulchre.

There are also three other significant churches in Rome which are dedicated to Saint Lawrence but not associated with his life:

- the Minor Basilica of St Lawrence in Lucina (Basilica Minore di San Lorenzo in Lucina), which possesses the relics of the gridiron on which and the chains with which he was martyred;
- the Church of St. Lawrence in Palatio ad Sancta Sanctorum, Pontifical Sanctuary of the Holy Stairs (Chiesa di San Lorenzo in Palatio ad Sancta Sanctorum, Pontificio Santuario della Scala Santa), proximate to the Archbasilica of St. John in Laterano, which was originally a private Papal chapel when the edifice that houses it was a Papal palace, and which housed some of the most precious relics of the Roman Catholic Church, hence the title "Sancta Sanctorum" ("Holy of Holies"); and
- the Church of St Lawrence in Piscibus (San Lorenzo in Piscibus), which is proximate to the Basilica of St. Peter.

== Miracles ==
The life and miracles of Lawrence were collected in The Acts of St Lawrence but those writings have been lost. The earliest existing documentation of miracles associated with him is in the writings of Gregory of Tours (538–594), who mentions the following:

A priest named Fr. Sanctulus was rebuilding a church of St. Lawrence, which had been attacked and burnt, and hired many workmen to accomplish the job. At one point during the construction, he found himself with nothing to feed them. He prayed to St. Lawrence for help, and looking in his basket he found a fresh, white loaf of bread. It seemed to him too small to feed the workmen, but in faith he began to serve it to the men. While he broke the bread, it so multiplied that his workmen fed from it for ten days.

The mediaeval Church of St Mary Assumed (Chiesa di Santa Maria Assunta) in the small commune of Amaseno, Lazio, Italy, houses the famous reliquary of the ampulla containing claimed relics associated with Lawrence, namely a quantum of his blood, a fragment of his flesh, some fat and ashes. Tradition holds that annually, on the Feast of St. Lawrence, and sometimes on other occasions, the blood in the ampulla miraculously liquefies during the Feast and re-coagulates by the following day.

== Veneration ==
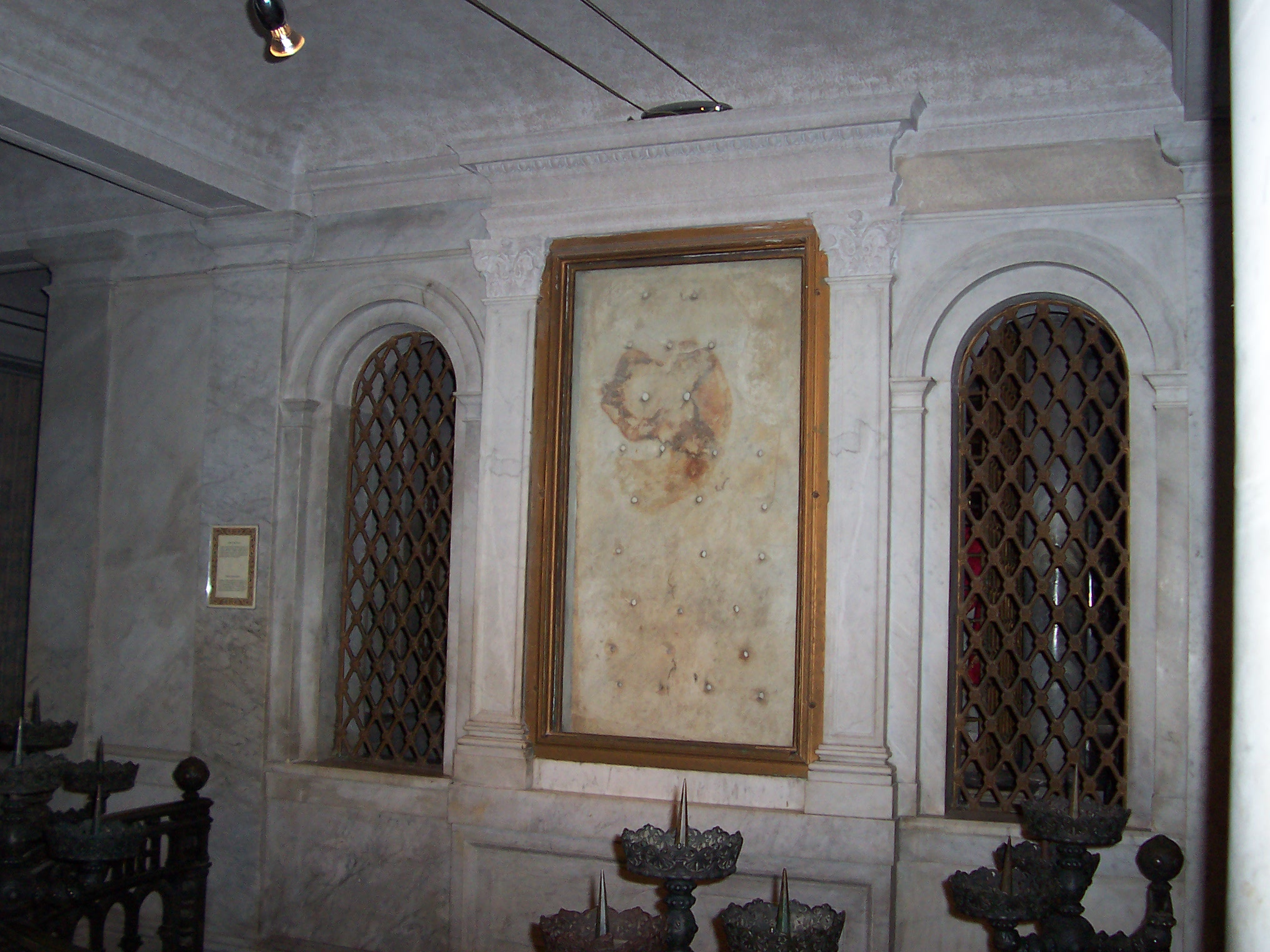
The stone on which St Lawrence's body was laid after death, in San Lorenzo fuori le mura

Due to his conspiring to hide and protect the written documents of the Church, Lawrence is known as the patron saint of archivists and librarians.

=== Roman Catholic Church ===
Lawrence is one of the most widely venerated saints of the Roman Catholic Church. Legendary details of his death were known to Damasus, Prudentius, Ambrose, and Augustine. Devotion to him was widespread by the fourth century. His liturgical celebration on 10 August has the rank of feast in the General Roman Calendar, consistent with the oldest Christian calendars, e.g. the Almanac of Philocalus for the year 354, the inventory of which contains the principal feasts of the Roman martyrs of the middle of the fourth century. He remains one of the saints enumerated in the "Roman Canon" of the Holy Mass as celebrated in the Latin Church.

Lawrence is especially honoured in the city of Rome, of which he is considered the third patron after St. Peter and St. Paul. The church built over his tomb, the Papal Minor Basilica di San Lorenzo fuori le Mura, became one of the seven principal churches of Rome and a favourite place of Roman pilgrimages. The area proximate to the Basilica di San Lorenzo fuori le Mura is named the "Quartiere San Lorenzo".

Because the Perseid Meteor Shower typically occurs annually in mid-August on or around his feast day, some refer to the shower as the "Tears of St Lawrence".

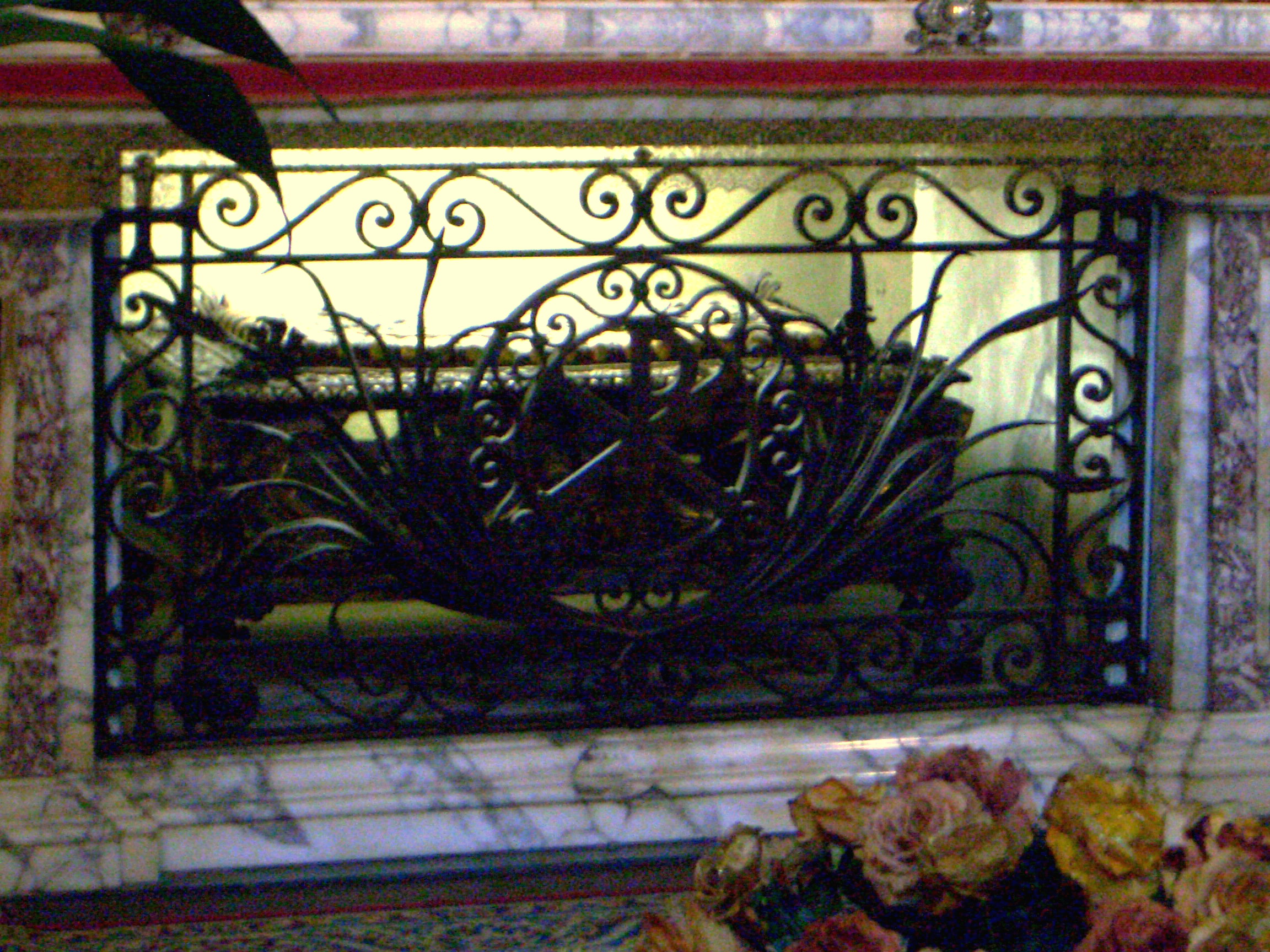
The shrine containing the gridiron that was used to roast St Lawrence to death according to tradition is in the Church of San Lorenzo in Lucina, Rome.

His intercession to God is invoked by librarians, archivists, comedians, cooks and tanners as their patron. He is the patron saint of Ampleforth Abbey, whose Benedictine monks founded one of the world's leading public schools for British (and other) Roman Catholics, located in North Yorkshire.

The Festival of San Lorenzo is a religious celebration occurring every year in Tarapacá, Chile.

=== Anglican Communion ===
Within Anglicanism Lawrence's name is variously spelled Laurence or Lawrence. His feast is on 10 August which is in the calendar of the Book of Common Prayer, the volume of prayers which, in its 1662 format, was the founding liturgical document of a majority of Anglican provinces. In the Book of Common Prayer the feast is titled "S Laurence, Archdeacon of Rome and Martyr". His feast on 10 August has been carried into the contemporary calendars of most Anglican provinces, Laurence is remembered in the Church of England with a Lesser Festival under the title "Laurence, deacon, martyr, 258" on 10 August.

Anglo-Catholics venerate Lawrence, who is the patron of many Anglican parish churches, including 228 in England. A major church in Sydney, Australia, in the former civil parish of St Laurence, is known as "Christ Church St Laurence". The Anglican charitable society Brotherhood of St Laurence also bears his name.

== Legacy ==
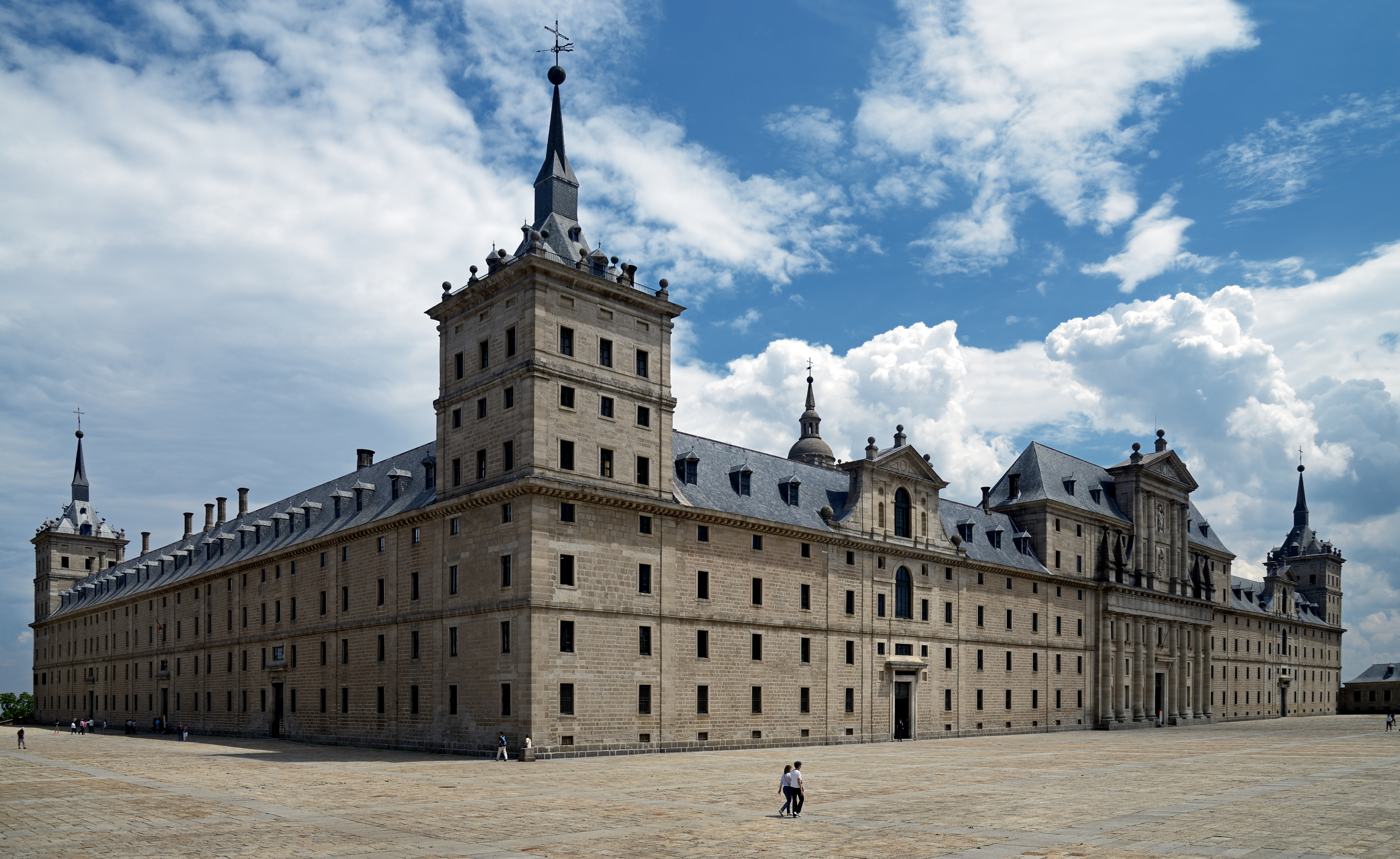
El Escorial, near Madrid, laid out in a pattern resembling a gridiron

According to Francesco Moraglia, the role of deacon is distinguished by service of the poor. He is destined both to the service of the table (corporal works of mercy) and to the service of the word (spiritual works of mercy). "The beauty, power and the heroism of [d]eacons such as Lawrence help to discover and come to a deeper meaning of the special nature of the diaconal ministry." Pope Leo XIV links Laurence with Saint Stephen, the first Christian martyr, as two deacons concerned with Christian service to the poor who died for their faith.

Many churches, schools, parishes, towns, and geographic features throughout the world are named for Lawrence of Rome. Depending on locality they are named St. Lawrence, St. Laurence, San Lorenzo, St. Laurent, St. Lorenz or similarly in other languages.

=== Europe ===
San Lorenzo del Escorial, the monastery built by King Philip II of Spain, commemorates his victory at the Battle of St. Quentin (1557) on the Feast of St. Lawrence. The monastery and the attached palace, college, and library are laid out in a pattern that resembles the gridiron of Lawrence's martyrdom.

The gridiron of Lawrence is also thought to be the basis of the design of the Certosa di San Lorenzo di Padula, which is a monastery in Padula, Salerno, Italy, and in Switzerland, Saint Lawrence is represented on the coat of arms of the city of Bülach with a gridiron.

=== Americas ===
Saint Lawrence is one of Canada's patron saints. On his second voyage, French explorer Jacques Cartier, arriving in the river estuary of the North American Great Lakes on the Feast of St. Lawrence in 1535, named it the Gulf of St. Lawrence. The river emptying into the gulf was named the St. Lawrence River. Many names in what are now Québec and the Maritime Provinces of Canada are references to this important seaway, e.g., the Laurentian Mountains north of the city of Montreal, Saint-Laurent (borough), Saint Lawrence Boulevard which spans the width of the Island of Montreal, and St. Lawrence County, New York, United States, near Lake Ontario. In the province of Ontario, St. Lawrence is a prominent, historic neighbourhood in the old centre of Toronto (formerly named York), now most known for the expansive St. Lawrence Market. The Laurentian Mountains gave rise to the name for the Laurential Plateau, or the Canadian Shield.

In Chile, the Day of the Miner (Spanish: Día del Minero) is commemorated on the feast of Saint Lawrence. On that day the National Mining Society awards the San Lorenzo Prize to individual miners and entities of the mineral industry. The rescue operation for the miners trapped in the 2010 Copiapó mining accident in Chile was named Operacíon San Lorenzo after Lawrence, patron saint of miners.

Bernalillo, New Mexico, celebrates three days of devotions to the Saint, to honor a devotional promise made by Spanish settlers during the 1692 Pueblo Revolt. Among the festivities are a set of dances performed by matachines. An image of the saint is kept in the house of a local family throughout the year, and a vigil and feast are held from 9–11 August. It is one of the oldest dancing processions in the New World.

== Patronage ==
- Against Fire
- Against Lumbago
- Archives and Archivists
- Armouries and Armourers
- Barbecues
- Brewers
- Butchers
- Comedians
- Cooks, chefs and restaurant owners
- Cutlers
- Deacons
- Glaziers and stained glass workers
- Laundry workers
- Libraries and librarians
- Miners
- Paupers and poor people
- Seminarians
- Students
- Tanners
- Viticulturists, wine makers and wine sellers
- Abano Terme, Italy
- Alba, Italy
- Angrogna, Italy
- Bernalillo, New Mexico, USA
- Berzo Demo, Italy
- Berzo Inferiore, Italy
- Brissogne, Italy
- Cabella Ligure, Italy
- Camino, Italy
- Canada
- Cavatore, Italy
- Chambave, Italy
- Denice, Italy
- Esbonderup, Denmark
- Folgaria, Italy
- Gamalero, Italy
- Gross Gartach, Germany
- Győrszemere, Hungary
- Huesca, Spain
- Il-Birgu, Malta
- Ilaya, Dapitan City, Philippines
- Limbaži, Latvia
- Lund, Sweden
- Montevarchi, Italy
- Mortara, Italy
- Naurod, Germany
- Oldenburg, Lower Saxony, Germany
- Pontinvrea, Italy
- Rome
- Rotterdam
- San Lawrenz, Malta
- San Lorenzo, Calabria, Italy
- Santena, Italy
- Scala, Italy
- Seravezza, Italy
- Sri Lanka
- Supino, Italy
- Tivoli, Italy
- Wodzisław Śląski, Poland
- Zagarolo, Italy

== Gallery ==
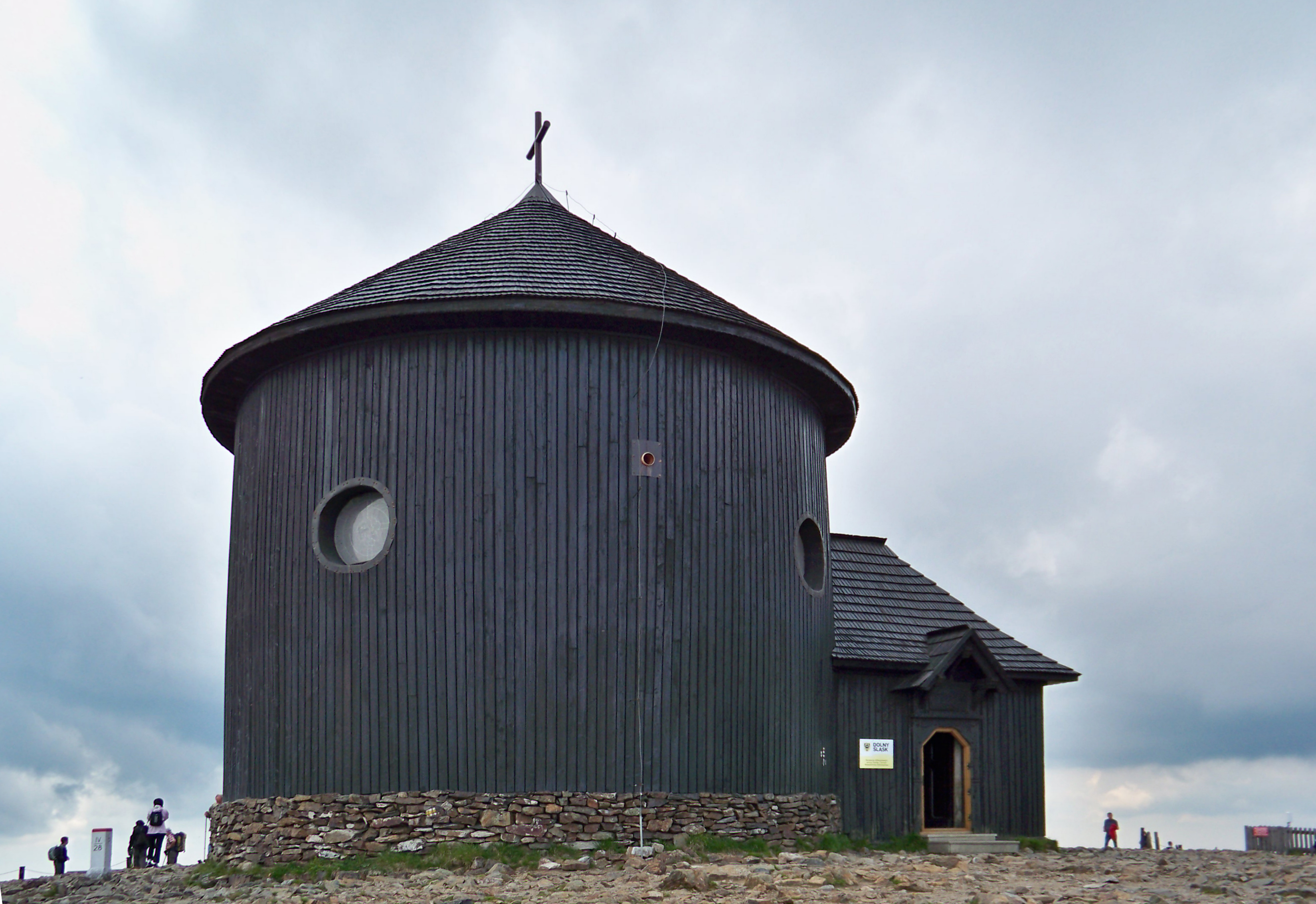
St. Lawrence's Chapel on top of the Sněžka in the Sudetes

A statue of St Lawrence overlooking the river named after him, the Saint Lawrence River

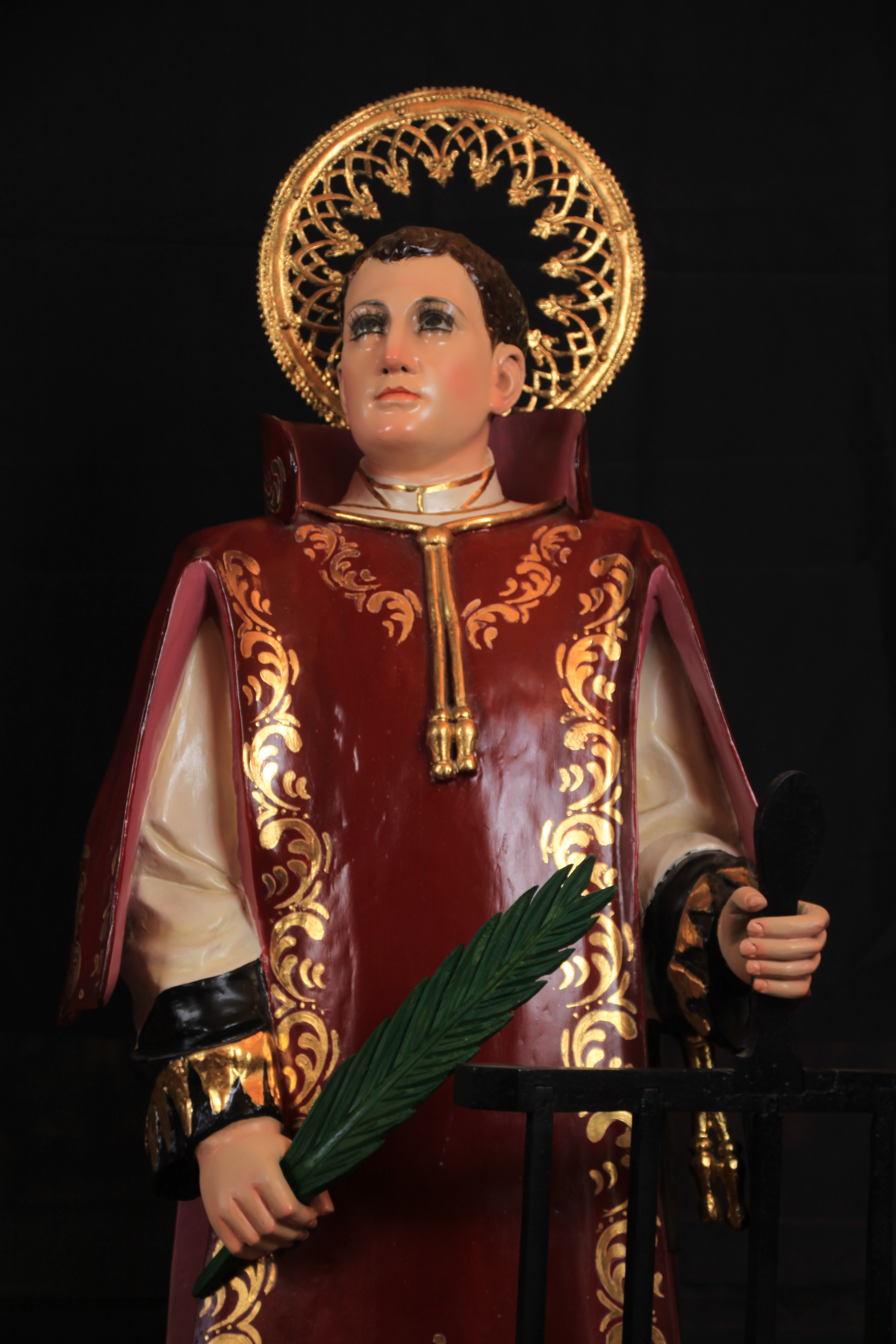
Altar Image of St. Lawrence of Rome in the San Lorenzo de Roma Church (Balagtas).

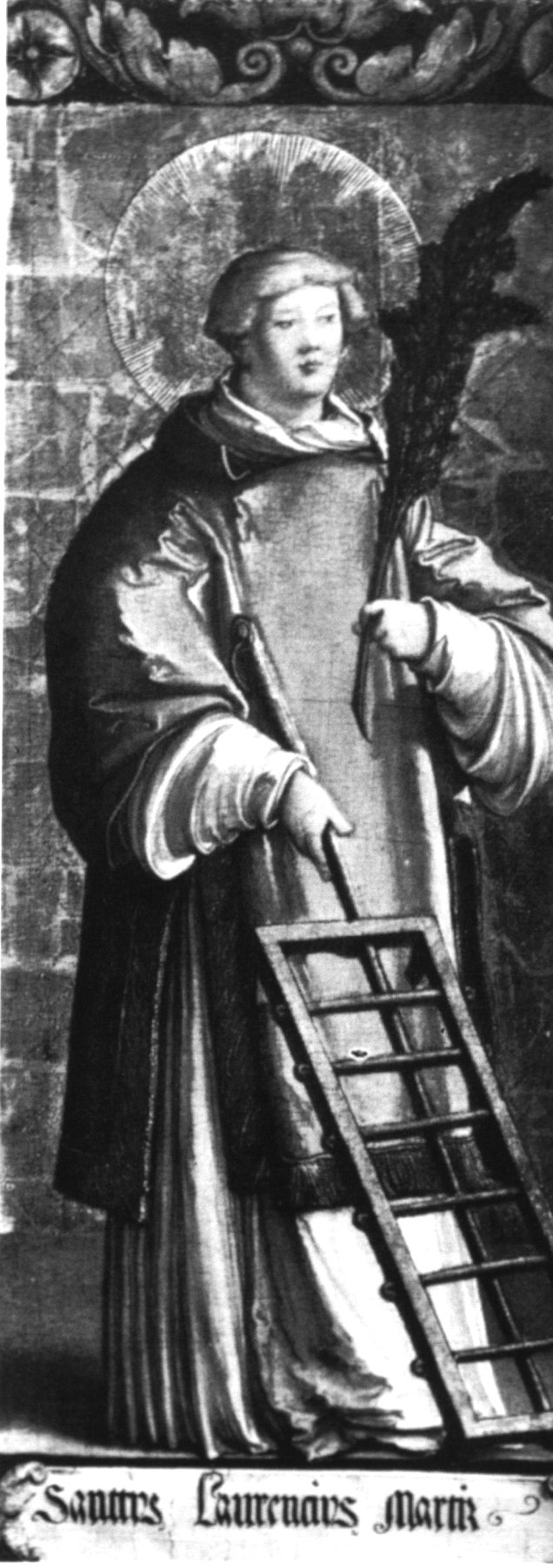
St Lawrence holding the gridiron, by the Master of Messkirch, c. 1535–40

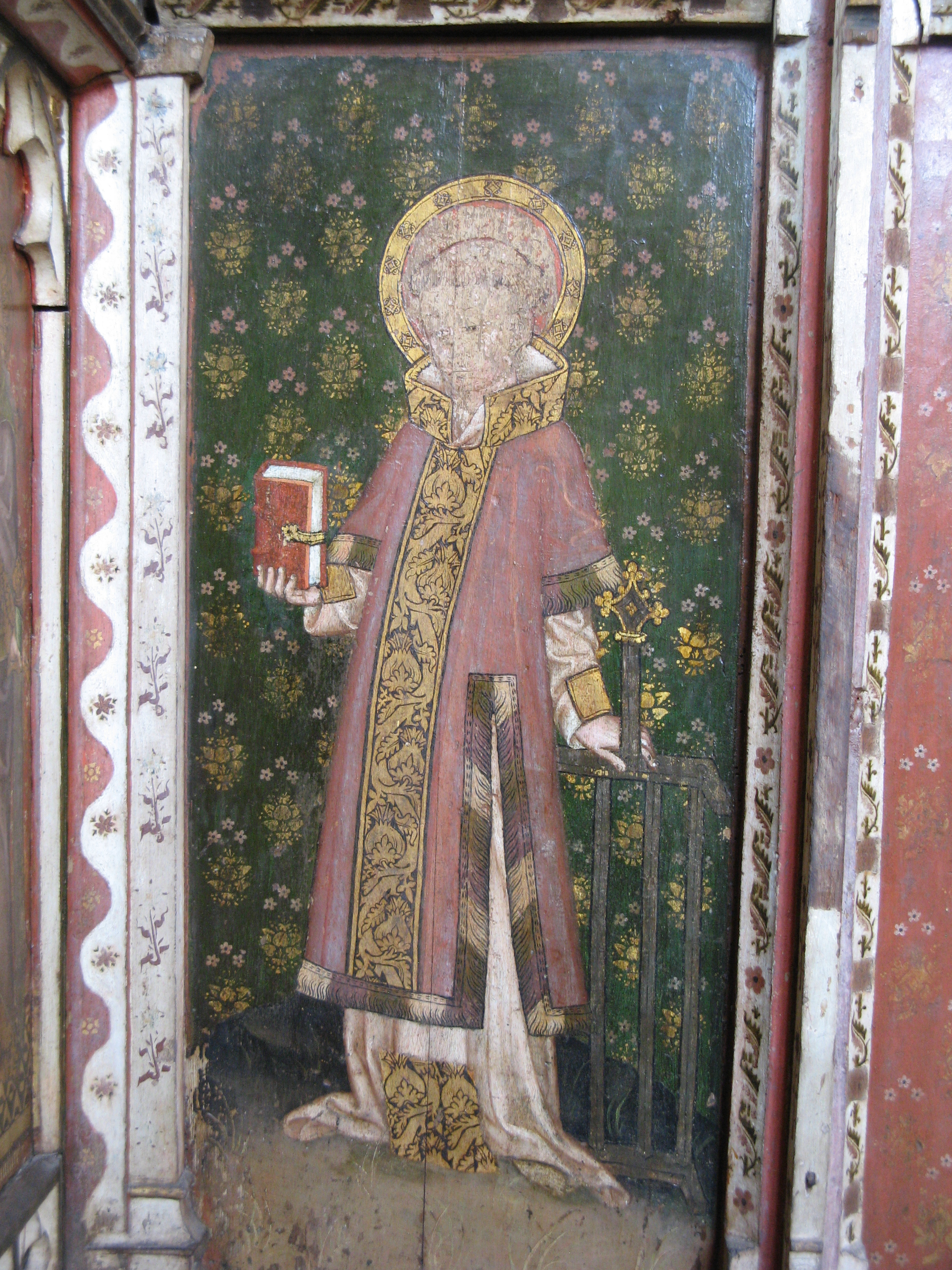
St Lawrence, Ranworth Rood Screen, Ranworth, St Helen's Church, UK, c. 1430

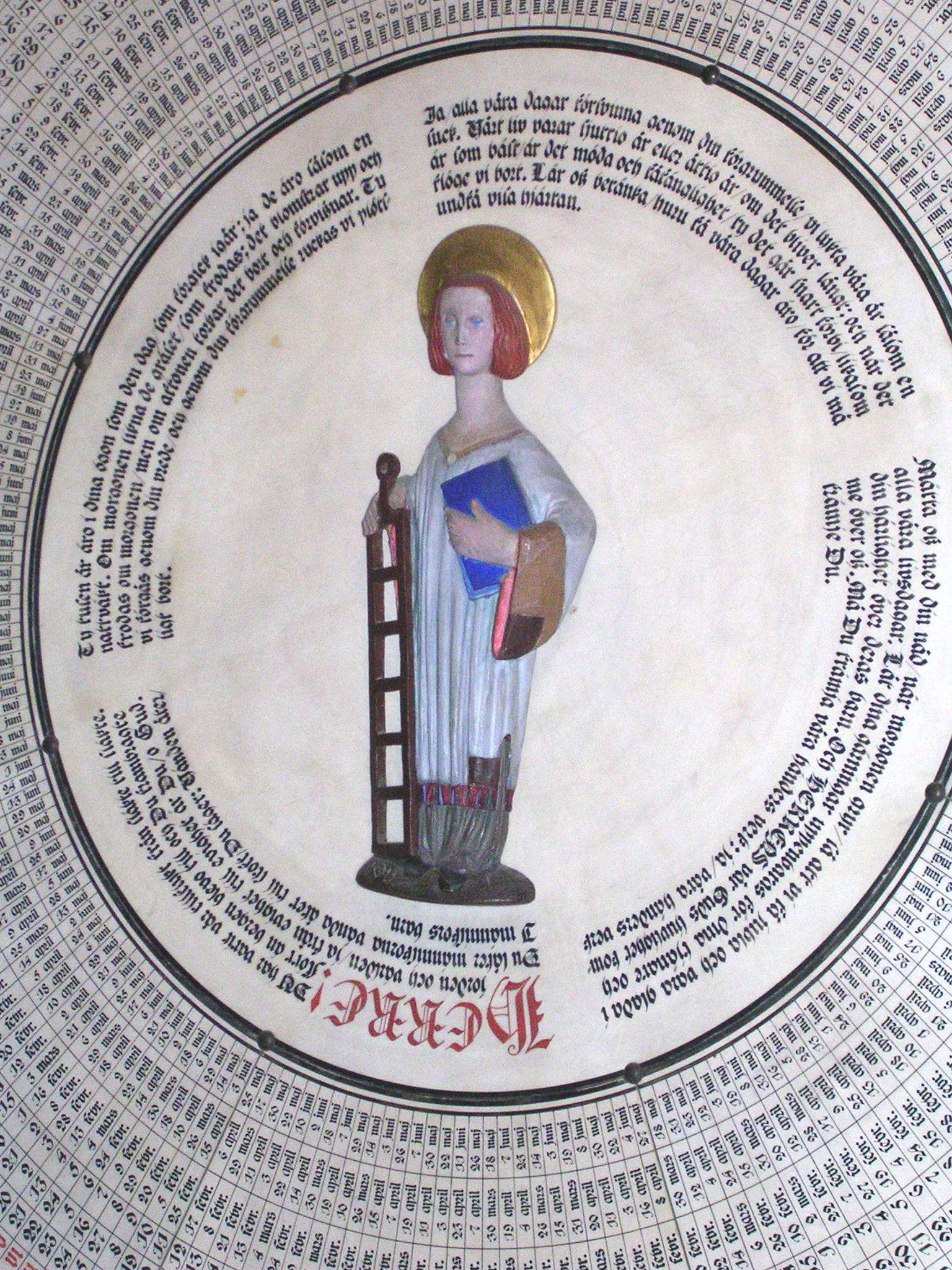
St Lawrence pictured on the astronomical clock in Lund Cathedral, Sweden

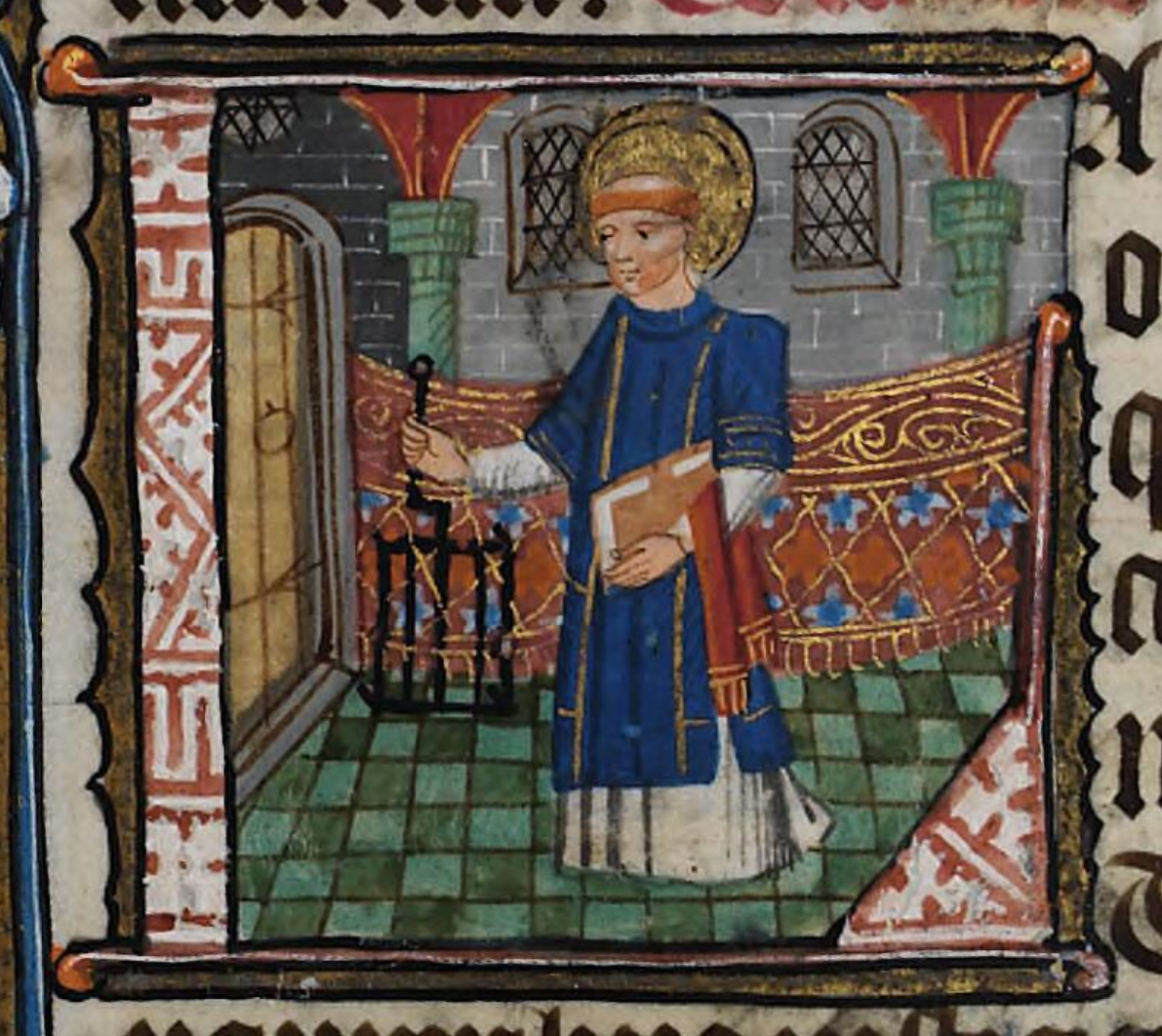
St Lawrence depicted in a 14th-century book of hours

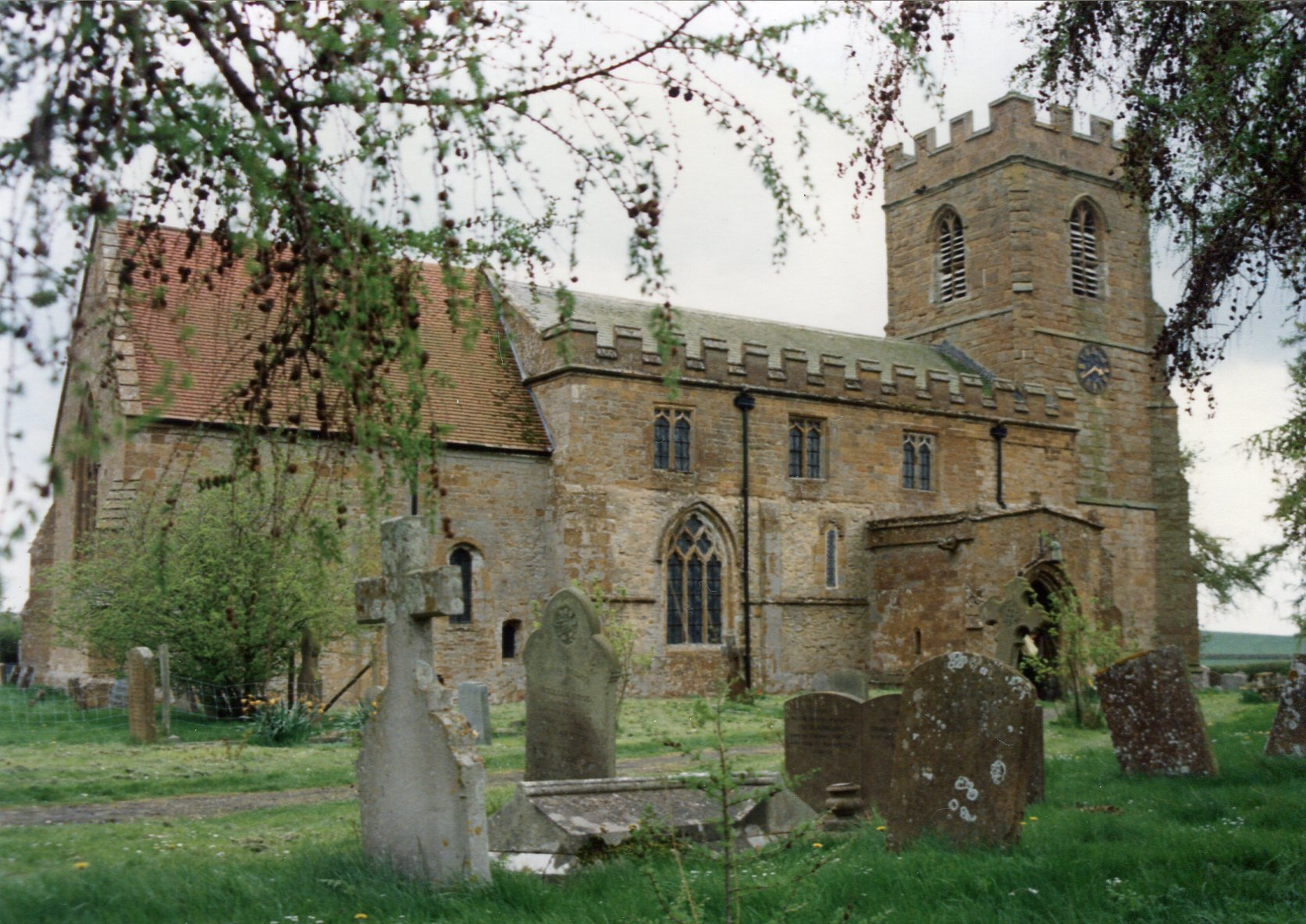
Church of St Lawrence, Oxhill, Warwickshire, England

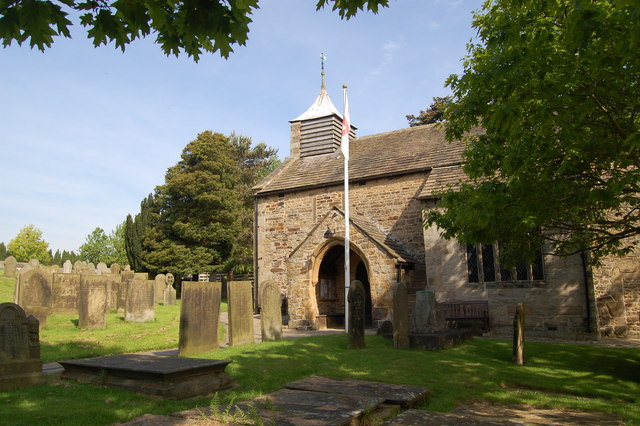
Church of St. Lawrence, Barlow

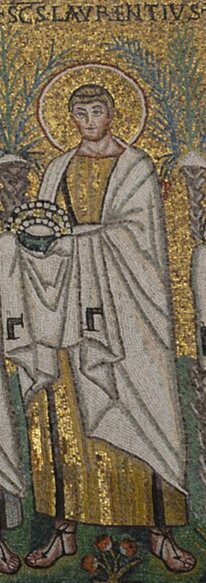
Mosaic of Saint Lawrence from the Basilica of Sant'Apollinare Nuovo in Ravenna

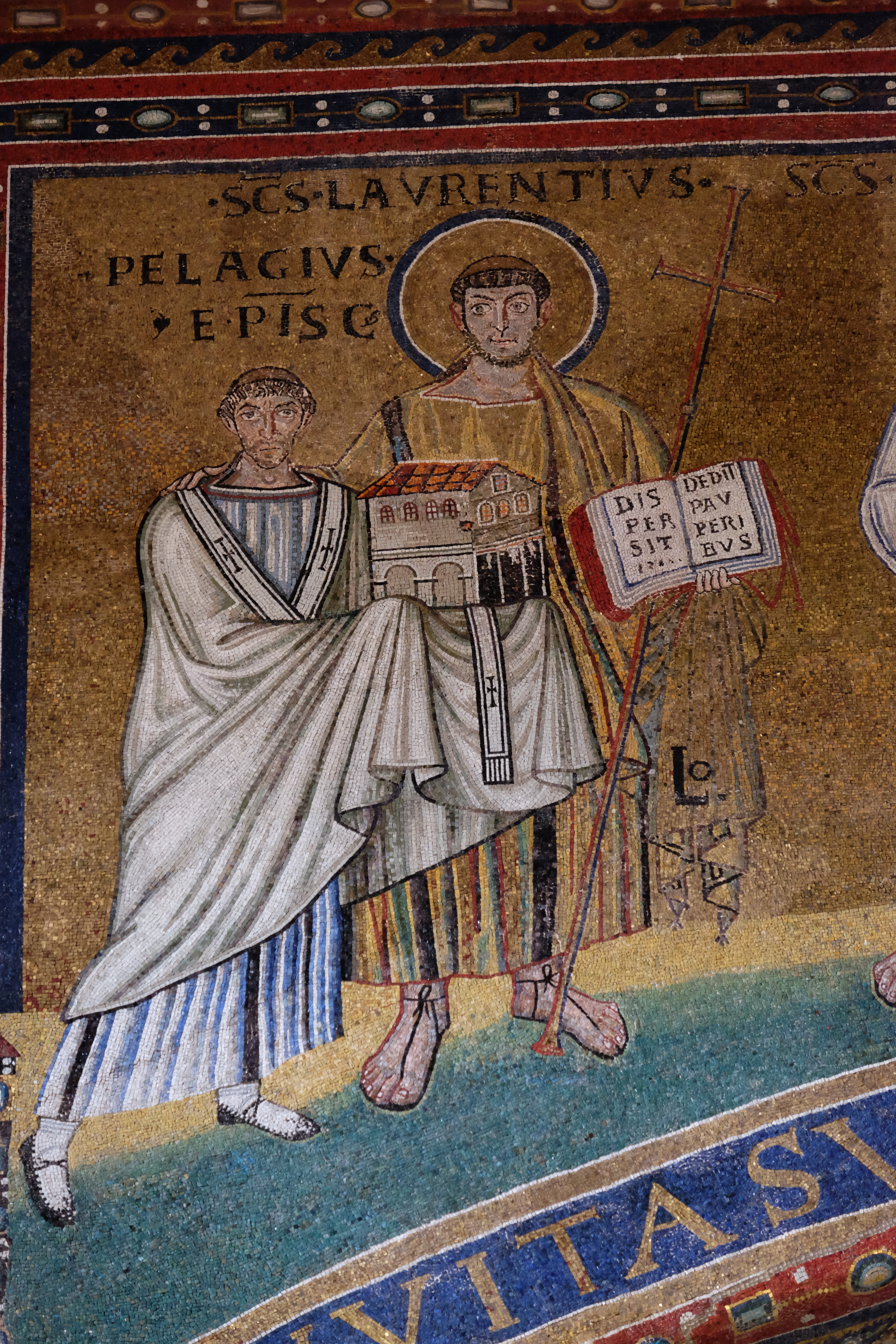
Mosaic from San Lorenzo fuori le mura

== In popular culture ==
In Fargo, season 1, episode 3, Lorne Malvo notes the stained glass window of St Lawrence in Stavros's office, in response to which Stavros narrates his martyrdom, in "A Muddy Road".

In a scene in the 1992 film Lorenzo's Oil, Augusto, Michaela, and Lorenzo tell a story about St Lawrence and refer to his Feast Day as "The Night of The Shooting Stars".

== In music ==
Marc-Antoine Charpentier, Motet de Saint Laurent, H.321, for one voice, two treble instruments and contino, 1677-78

== See also ==
- Saint Lawrence, patron saint archive

Several other saints were also named "Lawrence" (or the corresponding local variant), so one might also occasionally encounter something named after one of them. More information on these topics can currently be accessed through disambiguation articles like:

- Saint Lawrence (disambiguation)
- San Lorenzo (disambiguation)
- St. Laurence's Church (disambiguation)
