= Sněžka =

Mountain on Czech–Polish border

Sněžka Śnieżka
- Sněžka seen from the Sněžka Plateau

Highest point
- Elevation: 1,603.3 m (5,260 ft)
- Prominence: 1,197 m (3,927 ft)
- Parent peak: Stuiben (line parent)
- Isolation: 289.95 km (180.17 mi) to Malý Kriváň
- Listing: Country high point
- Coordinates: 50°44′10″N 15°44′25″E

Geography
- Location within Czech Republic Location within Lower Silesian Voivodeship Location within Poland
- Location: Pec pod Sněžkou/Karpacz
- Country: Czech Republic/Poland
- Parent range: Giant Mountains

Climbing
- Easiest route: tourist trails, cable car from Pec pod Sněžkou

Sněžka (Czech pronunciation: [ˈsɲɛʃka]) or Śnieżka (Polish pronunciation: [ˈɕɲɛʂka]; German: Schneekoppe) is a mountain on the border between the Czech Republic and Poland, the most prominent point of the Silesian Ridge in the Giant Mountains. At 1,603.3 metres (5,260 ft), its summit is the highest point in the Czech Republic, in the Lower Silesian Voivodeship, in the Giant Mountains and in the entire Sudetes.

== History ==
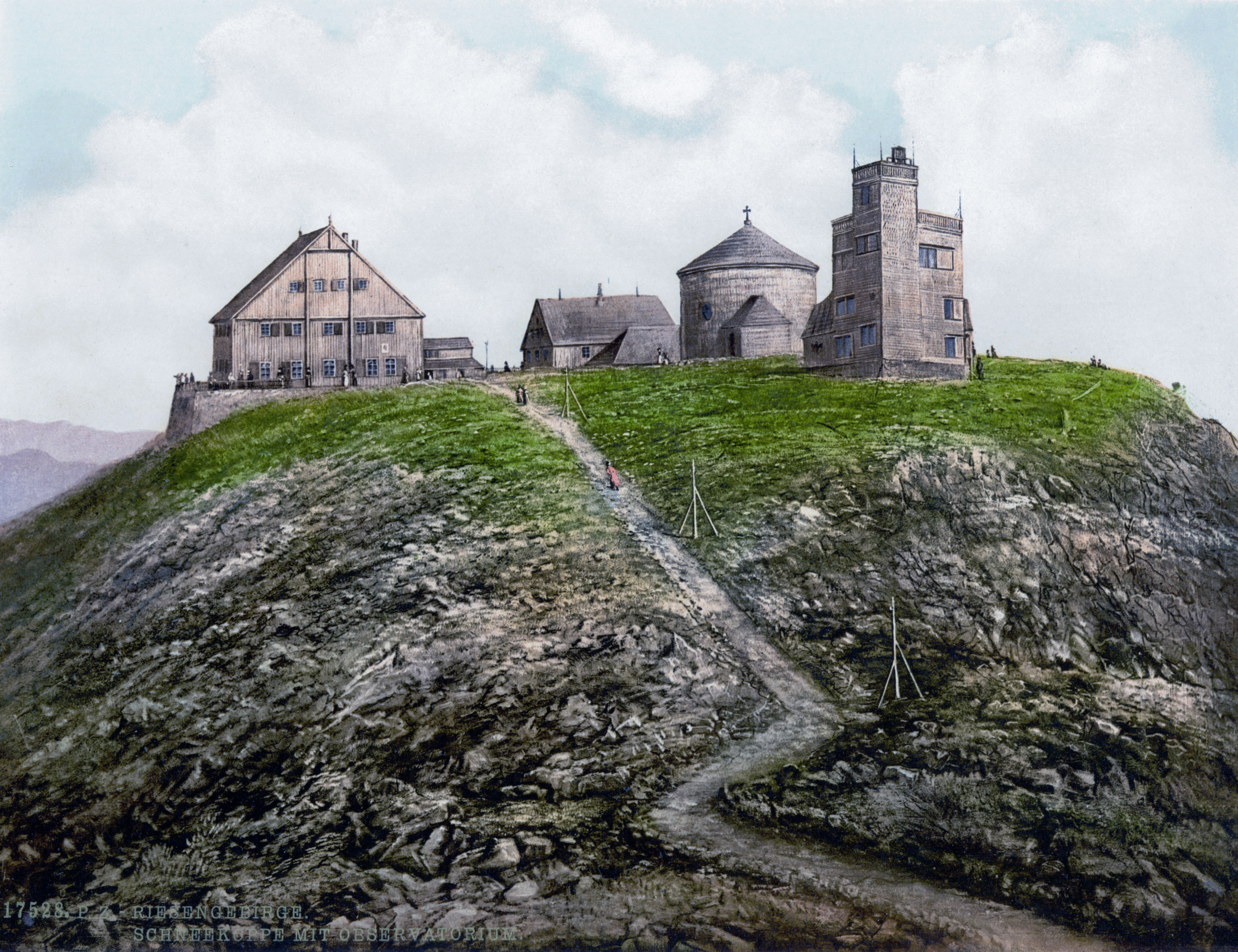
Sněžka in 1900

Sněžka was one of the first European mountains visited by many tourists. This was mainly due to the relatively minor technical difficulties of the ascent and the fact that since the sixteenth century, many resort visitors flocked to the nearby Bad Warmbrunn (today: Cieplice Śląskie-Zdrój) and the highly visible Sněžka, visually dominant over all Giant Mountains was for them an important attraction.

The first historical account of an ascent to the peak is in 1456, by an unknown Venetian merchant searching for precious stones. The first settlements on the mountain soon appeared, being primarily mining communities, tapping into its deposits of copper, iron and arsenic. The mining shafts, totalling 1.5 kilometres (0.93 mi) in length, remain to this day.

The first recorded German name was Riseberg ('giant mountain', cf. Riesengebirge, 'Giant Mountains'), mentioned by Georg Agricola in 1546. Fifteen years later the name Riesenberg appears on Martin Helwig's map of Silesia. The German name later changed to Riesenkoppe ('giant top') and finally to Schneekoppe ('snow top', 'snowy head'). Based on paintings of Caspar David Friedrich and of novels from Theodor Fontane the Schneekoppe region became a centre of the first German tourism movement.

In Czech, the mountain was initially called Pahrbek Sněžný ('snow hill'); later Sněžka, with the eventual name Sněžovka, meaning 'snowy' or 'snow-covered', which was adopted in 1823. An older Polish name for the mountain was Góra Olbrzymia, meaning 'giant mountain'.

The first building on the mountaintop was the Chapel of Saint Lawrence (Laurentiuskapelle), built c. 1665–1681 by the Silesian noble Schaffgotsch family to give thanks to God and shelter to travellers as it also served as an inn for a brief period of time. The territory including the mines were the property of the Schaffgotsch family until 1945. The so-called Prussian hut (Preußische Baude) was built on the Silesian (now Polish) side in 1850, followed by the Bohemian hut (Česká bouda) on the Bohemian (now Czech) side in 1868, both built with the purpose of providing lodging. The Prussian hut was rebuilt twice after fires (1857 and 1862), and the (after 1945) "Polish hut" was finally demolished in 1967. The Bohemian hut fell into disrepair after 1990 and was demolished in 2004.

A wooden weather station was built on the mountaintop in c. 1900, being the only weather station in Central Europe remaining intact after World War II. It was demolished in the 1980s.

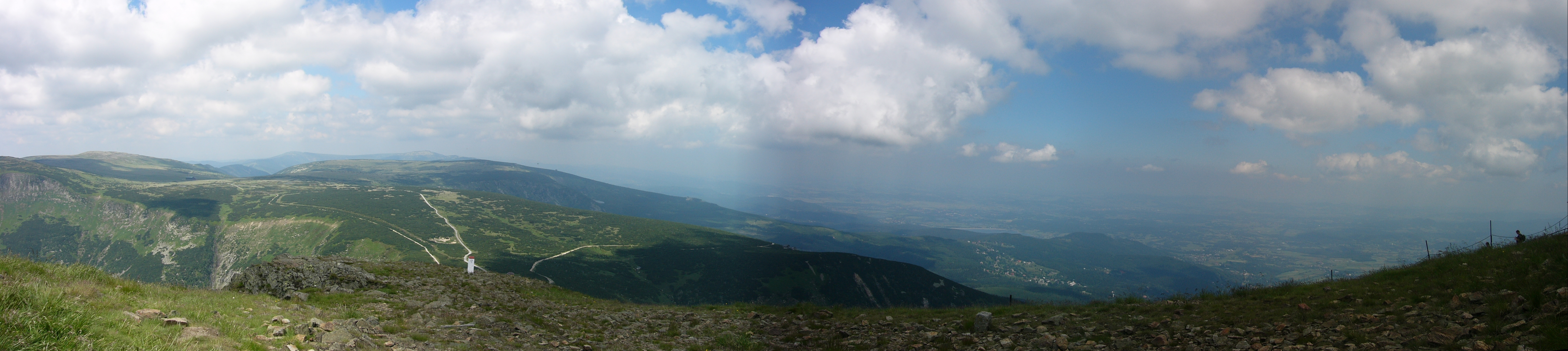
View from the summit of Sněžka

== Today ==
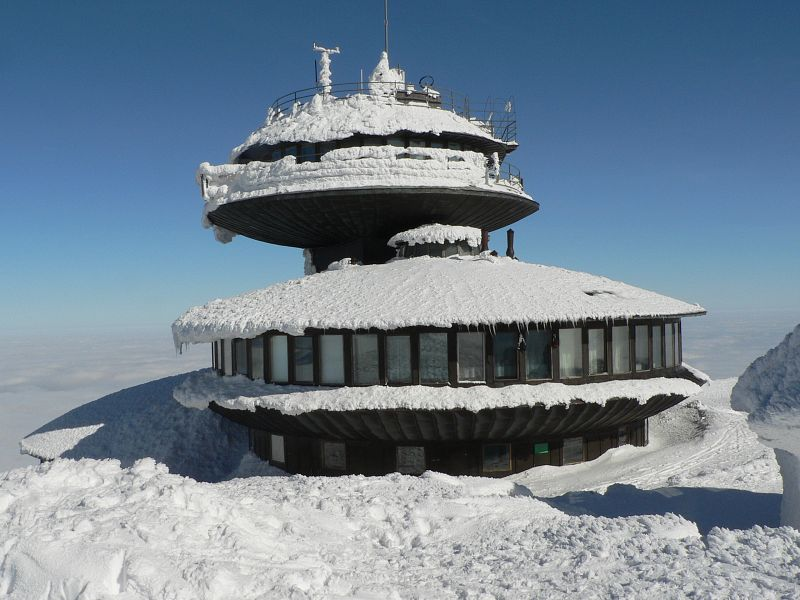
The Polish meteo observatory

One side of the mountain is in the Czech Republic; the other has belonged to Poland since 1945. Both sides of the border lost their historic German-speaking populations in the wake of World War II. The area is very popular in summer with tourists from the Czech Republic, Poland and Germany, who enjoy hiking in the alpine environment unique to this area.

On the Polish side a disc-shaped observatory with a weather station and restaurant was built in 1974, and the St Lawrence Chapel. On the Czech side are a post office and a chairlift station connecting the peak with the town of Pec pod Sněžkou at the base of the mountain.

Although the mountain is the highest natural peak in the Czech Republic, the actual highest point is the top of the television transmitter on Praděd, reaching 1,652 metres (1,491+162 m). If the Polish observatory is taken into account, Sněžka peaks at 1,620 metres.

In 2004 a new post office and observation platform replaced an old post office and the remains of the Bohemian hut, which had been closed since the 1980s.

In March 2009 the Polish observatory suffered serious damage to the upper disc as a result of extreme weather and structural failure. The upper disc's floor broke, though a fast response from the Technical University of Wrocław saved the remaining disc from taking any further damage. The restaurant and meteo offices were reopened soon after the construction team had finished clearing the debris and securing what was left of the observatory. After detailed inspection it was determined that no further damage should occur and the building was restored to its previous state. The upper disc was restored to its 1974 design (with contemporary improvements), skipping alterations made in 1980s and 1990s which were suspected to contribute to the structural failure of March 2009.

The old chairlift to the top of Sněžka was replaced by a new cable car system. Since February 2014, the four-person cabins in two sections have carried 250 visitors per hour from Pec pod Sněžkou.

There are many marked tourist routes from the Polish side to the summit, mainly from the town of Karpacz. It is possible to take a chairlift from Karpacz to Kopa (1377 m a.s.l.) which significantly shortens the way to the summit.

Sněžka belongs to the Crown of Europe, Crown of Polish Mountains and Crown of Sudetes.

== Climate ==
Due to high altitude the climate is maritime polar (Köppen: ET) not far from a continental subpolar climate (Dfc). The difference should be at least 6 °C lower on annual average compared to the weather station in the plains.

Climate data for Sněžka: 1,603 m (5,259 ft)(1991-2020 normals, extremes 1951-present)
Month	Jan	Feb	Mar	Apr	May	Jun	Jul	Aug	Sep	Oct	Nov	Dec	Year
Record high °C (°F)	10.5 (50.9)	13.5 (56.3)	12.1 (53.8)	18.2 (64.8)	21.2 (70.2)	22.6 (72.7)	24.6 (76.3)	24.3 (75.7)	21.3 (70.3)	19.9 (67.8)	17.1 (62.8)	12.0 (53.6)	24.6 (76.3)
Mean maximum °C (°F)	4.4 (39.9)	4.5 (40.1)	6.0 (42.8)	10.9 (51.6)	15.4 (59.7)	18.8 (65.8)	20.2 (68.4)	20.0 (68.0)	15.4 (59.7)	12.8 (55.0)	9.4 (48.9)	6.0 (42.8)	21.8 (71.2)
Mean daily maximum °C (°F)	−3.3 (26.1)	−3.7 (25.3)	−1.9 (28.6)	2.7 (36.9)	7.4 (45.3)	10.7 (51.3)	12.7 (54.9)	12.8 (55.0)	8.3 (46.9)	4.6 (40.3)	1.0 (33.8)	−2.2 (28.0)	4.1 (39.4)
Daily mean °C (°F)	−5.9 (21.4)	−6.2 (20.8)	−4.3 (24.3)	0.0 (32.0)	4.4 (39.9)	7.7 (45.9)	9.8 (49.6)	9.9 (49.8)	5.8 (42.4)	2.1 (35.8)	−1.6 (29.1)	−4.7 (23.5)	1.4 (34.5)
Mean daily minimum °C (°F)	−8.3 (17.1)	−8.5 (16.7)	−6.5 (20.3)	−2.2 (28.0)	2.1 (35.8)	5.4 (41.7)	7.5 (45.5)	7.8 (46.0)	3.8 (38.8)	−0.1 (31.8)	−3.9 (25.0)	−7.1 (19.2)	−0.8 (30.6)
Mean minimum °C (°F)	−16.7 (1.9)	−16.5 (2.3)	−13.5 (7.7)	−10.1 (13.8)	−4.7 (23.5)	−1.0 (30.2)	1.4 (34.5)	1.7 (35.1)	−2.2 (28.0)	−7.0 (19.4)	−11.1 (12.0)	−14.7 (5.5)	−19.3 (−2.7)
Record low °C (°F)	−32.1 (−25.8)	−33.9 (−29.0)	−25.5 (−13.9)	−15.5 (4.1)	−13.1 (8.4)	−7.1 (19.2)	−2.2 (28.0)	−2.6 (27.3)	−5.8 (21.6)	−14.7 (5.5)	−20.3 (−4.5)	−24.9 (−12.8)	−33.9 (−29.0)
Average precipitation mm (inches)	107.3 (4.22)	88.5 (3.48)	87.7 (3.45)	51.1 (2.01)	77.5 (3.05)	98.1 (3.86)	120.6 (4.75)	95.4 (3.76)	87.3 (3.44)	79.9 (3.15)	83.4 (3.28)	113.8 (4.48)	1,090.6 (42.94)
Average extreme snow depth cm (inches)	78.8 (31.0)	99.7 (39.3)	109.7 (43.2)	76.0 (29.9)	25.8 (10.2)	0.8 (0.3)	0.0 (0.0)	0.0 (0.0)	1.2 (0.5)	7.3 (2.9)	16.9 (6.7)	43.1 (17.0)	109.7 (43.2)
Average precipitation days (≥ 0.1 mm)	22.57	20.50	22.00	17.23	19.10	18.67	18.77	16.80	17.97	21.37	22.03	23.03	240.03
Average snowy days (≥ 0 cm)	31.0	28.3	31.0	28.3	10.0	0.4	0.0	0.0	1.1	8.2	18.7	29.3	186.3
Average relative humidity (%)	84.5	86.1	88.1	85.7	86.8	87.6	86.6	85.8	89.9	87.6	86.5	84.6	86.6
Average dew point °C (°F)	−9 (16)	−9 (16)	−7 (19)	−2 (28)	2 (36)	6 (43)	8 (46)	7 (45)	4 (39)	−1 (30)	−4 (25)	−8 (18)	−1 (30)
Mean monthly sunshine hours	72.2	80.1	103.3	157.8	177.8	172.2	187.9	190.0	122.3	99.6	67.9	63.8	1,494.8
Source 1: Institute of Meteorology and Water Management
Source 2: Meteomodel.pl (records, relative humidity 1991–2020), Time and Date (dewpoints, 2005-2015)

Climate data for Sněžka (ridge), elevation 1603 m; 1961–1990
Month	Jan	Feb	Mar	Apr	May	Jun	Jul	Aug	Sep	Oct	Nov	Dec	Year
Record high °C (°F)	9.0 (48.2)	9.2 (48.6)	12.0 (53.6)	18.2 (64.8)	18.4 (65.1)	20.5 (68.9)	23.6 (74.5)	23.4 (74.1)	21.1 (70.0)	18.1 (64.6)	14.6 (58.3)	13.2 (55.8)	23.6 (74.5)
Mean daily maximum °C (°F)	−4.5 (23.9)	−4.4 (24.1)	−2.5 (27.5)	1.2 (34.2)	6.3 (43.3)	9.4 (48.9)	10.9 (51.6)	11.1 (52.0)	8.0 (46.4)	4.9 (40.8)	−0.4 (31.3)	−3.1 (26.4)	3.1 (37.5)
Daily mean °C (°F)	−7.0 (19.4)	−6.8 (19.8)	−5.0 (23.0)	−1.4 (29.5)	3.4 (38.1)	6.5 (43.7)	8.0 (46.4)	8.2 (46.8)	5.3 (41.5)	2.3 (36.1)	−2.8 (27.0)	−5.6 (21.9)	0.4 (32.8)
Mean daily minimum °C (°F)	−9.5 (14.9)	−9.1 (15.6)	−7.2 (19.0)	−3.6 (25.5)	1.2 (34.2)	4.3 (39.7)	5.8 (42.4)	6.1 (43.0)	3.3 (37.9)	0.0 (32.0)	−5.0 (23.0)	−8.0 (17.6)	−1.8 (28.7)
Record low °C (°F)	−32.1 (−25.8)	−22.6 (−8.7)	−25.5 (−13.9)	−14.8 (5.4)	−12.0 (10.4)	−7.1 (19.2)	−2.2 (28.0)	−2.6 (27.3)	−5.3 (22.5)	−12.0 (10.4)	−17.4 (0.7)	−24.9 (−12.8)	−32.1 (−25.8)
Average precipitation mm (inches)	87 (3.4)	91 (3.6)	87 (3.4)	104 (4.1)	123 (4.8)	141 (5.6)	138 (5.4)	132 (5.2)	85 (3.3)	76 (3.0)	103 (4.1)	96 (3.8)	1,263 (49.7)
Average precipitation days (≥ 1.0 mm)	16.2	14.6	15.0	13.6	13.4	14.7	13.5	12.5	11.9	11.3	16.2	16.9	169.8
Mean monthly sunshine hours	72.0	84.0	101.0	125.0	158.0	143.0	154.0	155.0	116.0	117.0	62.0	65.0	1,352
Source: NOAA

== Gallery ==
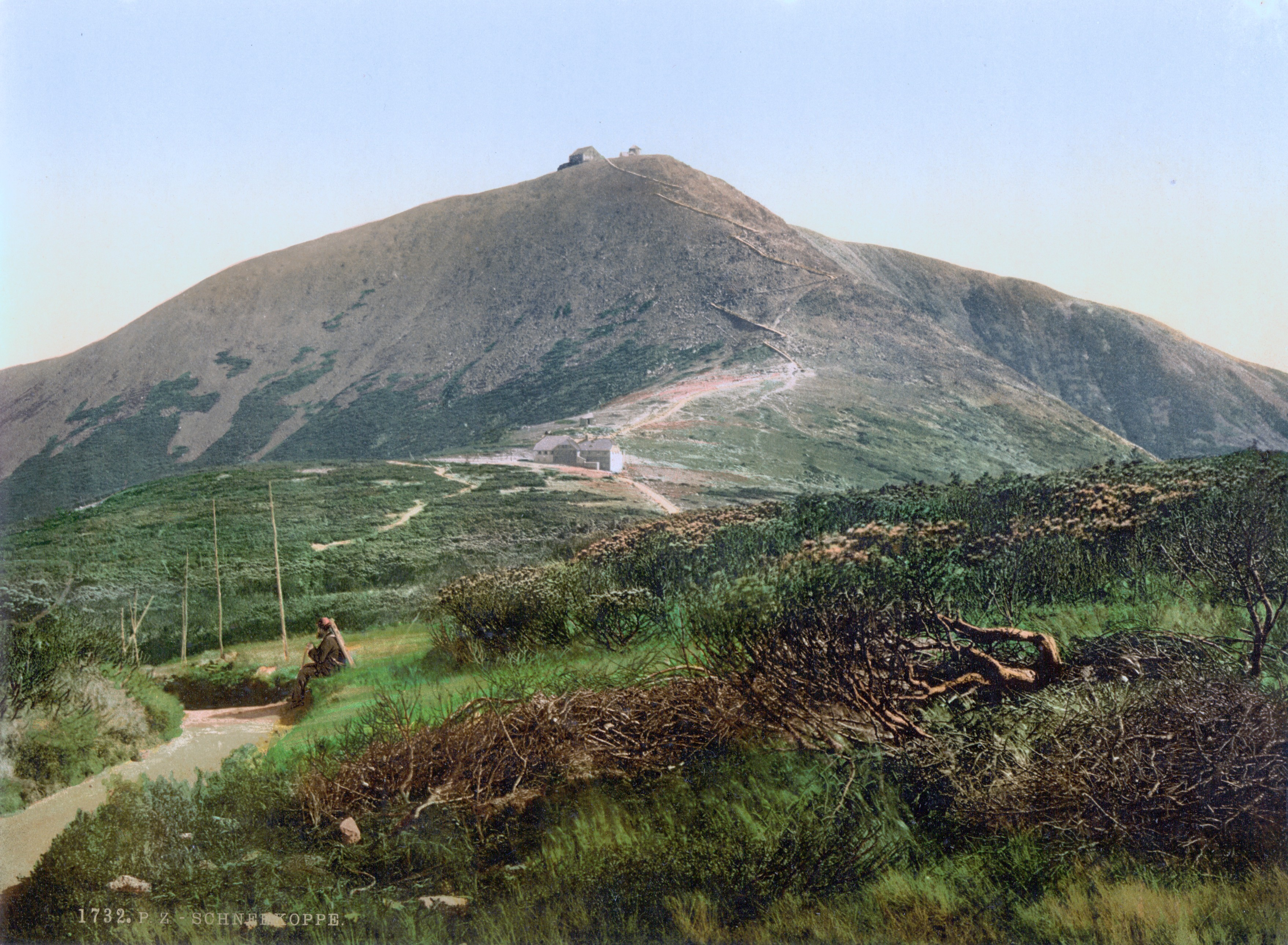
Sněžka, a photochrom print from ca. 1900

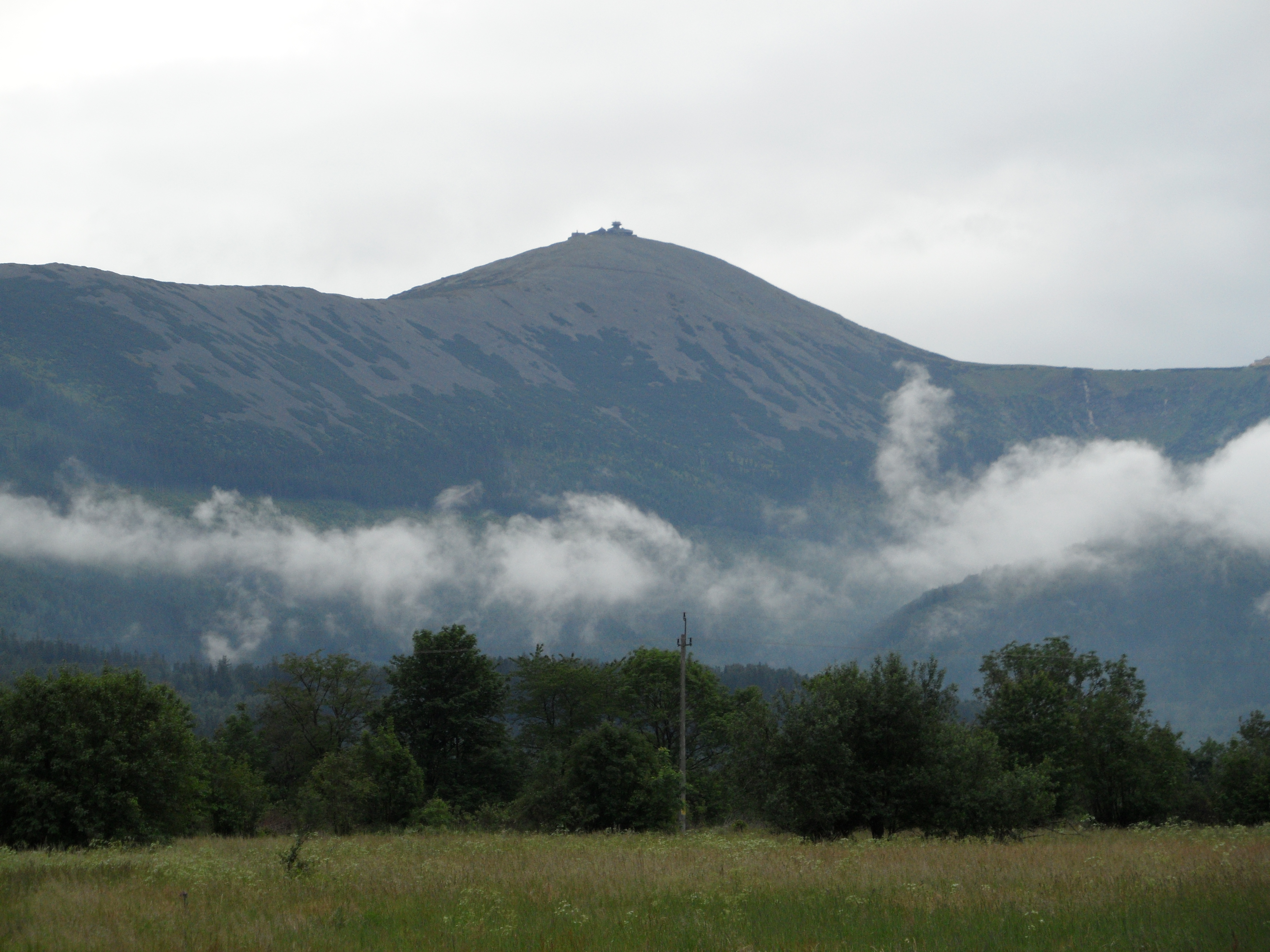
Sněžka above the clouds

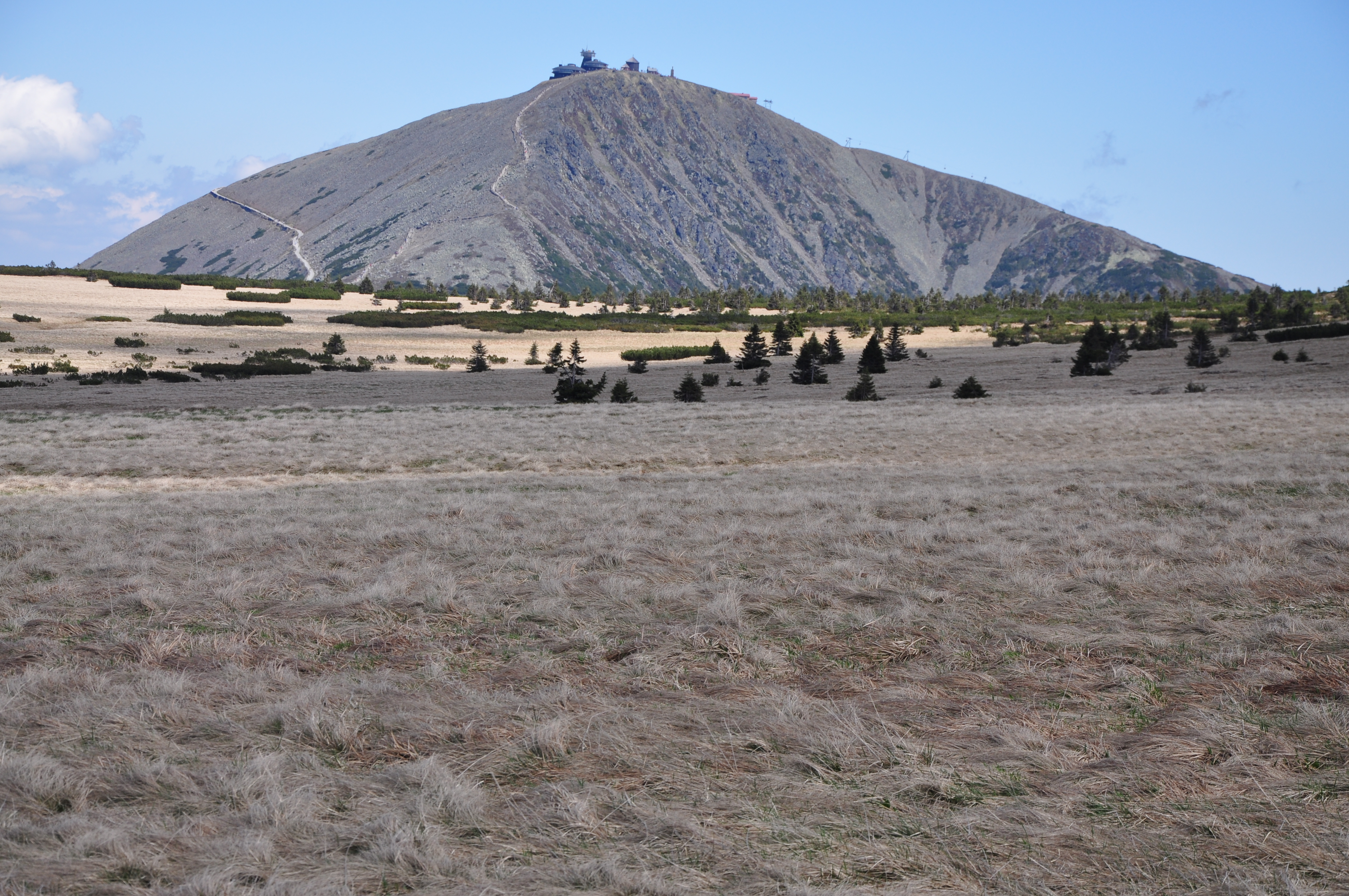
Panorama of Sněžka

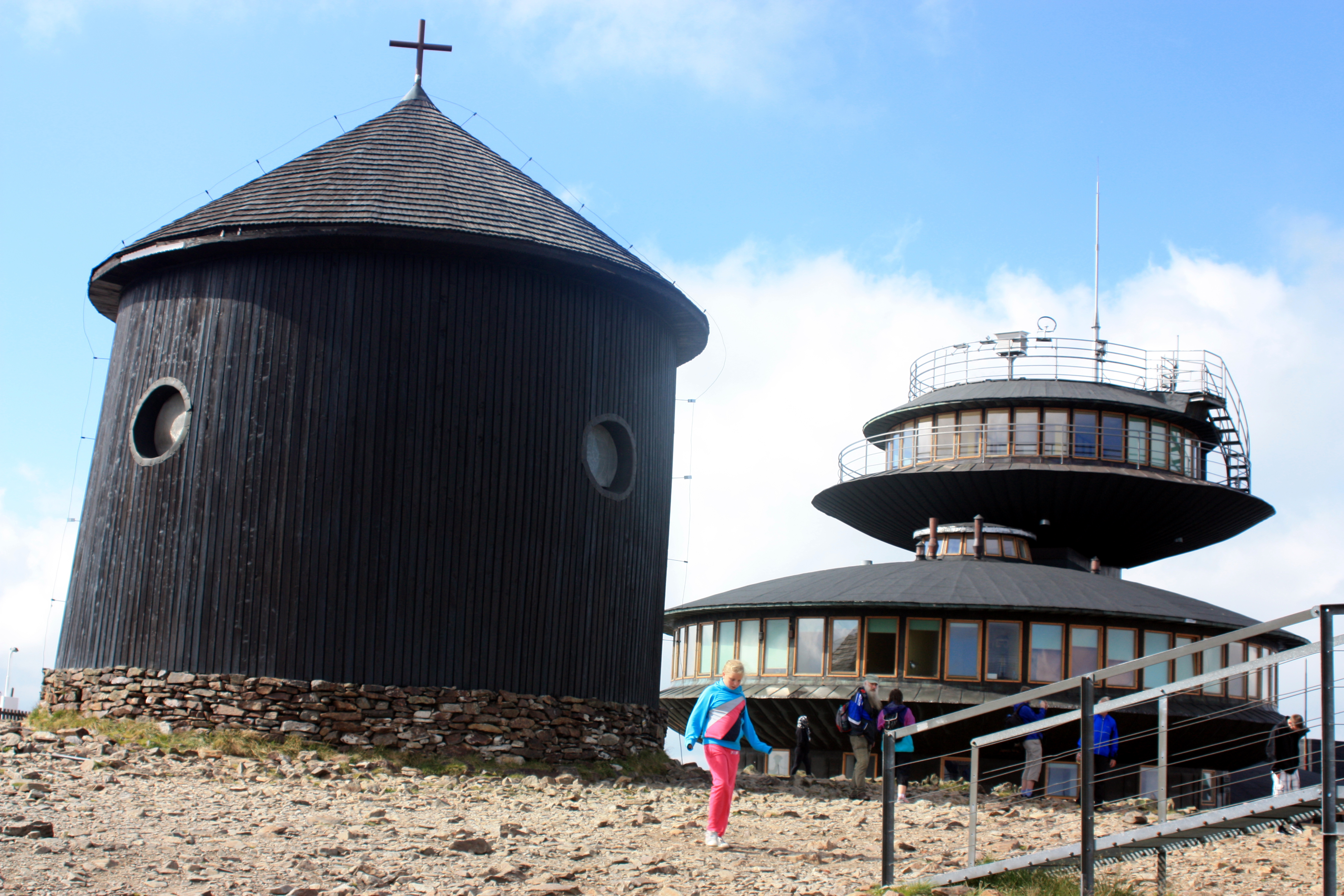
St. Lawrence's Chapel built in 1665–1681

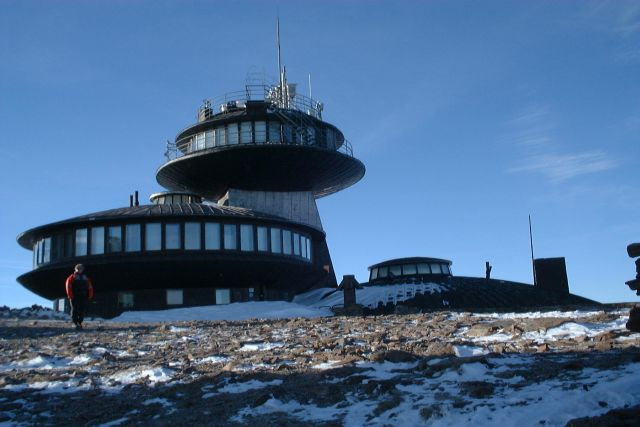
Observatory on the mountain top

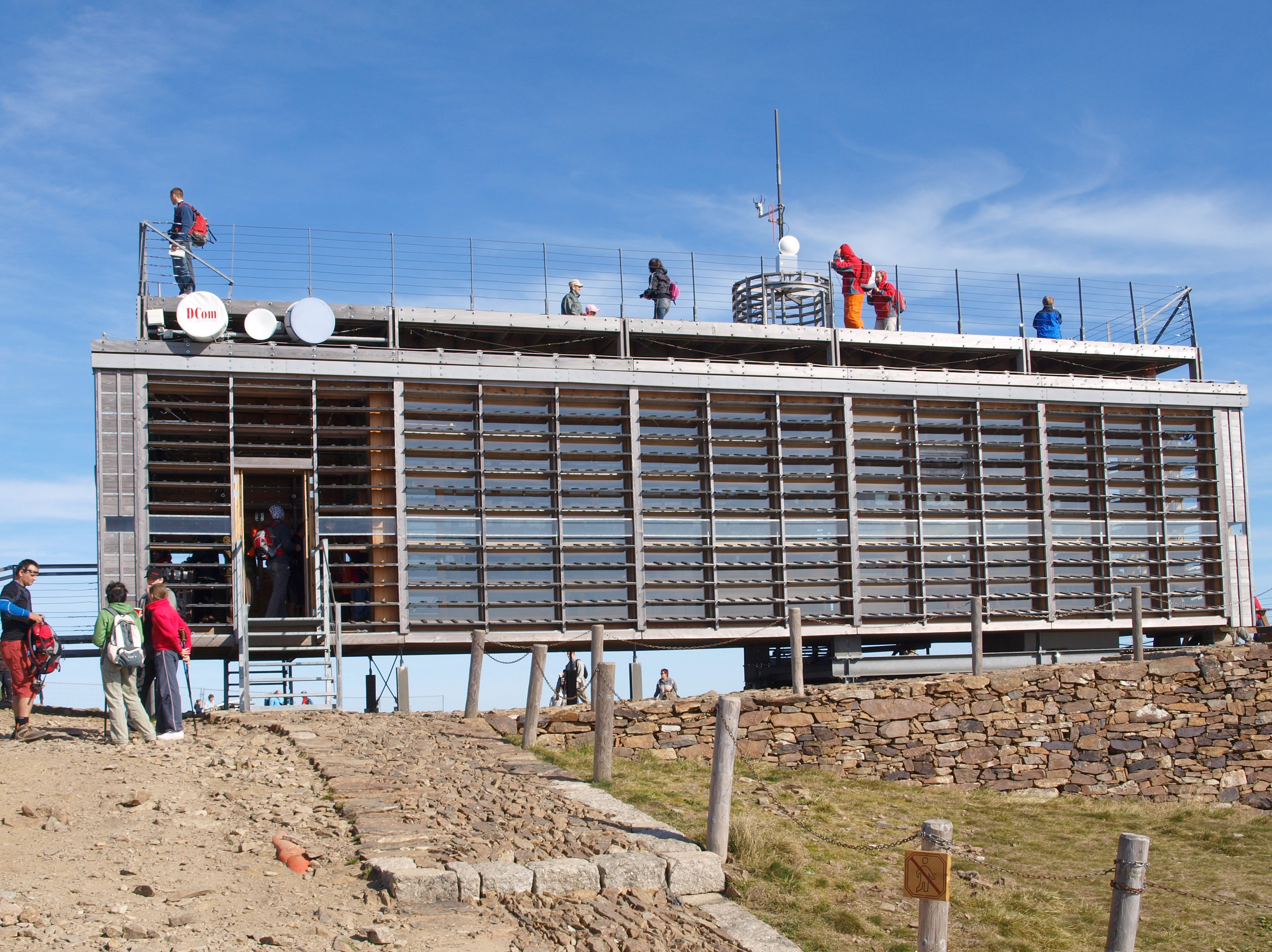
Czech post office building atop Sněžka

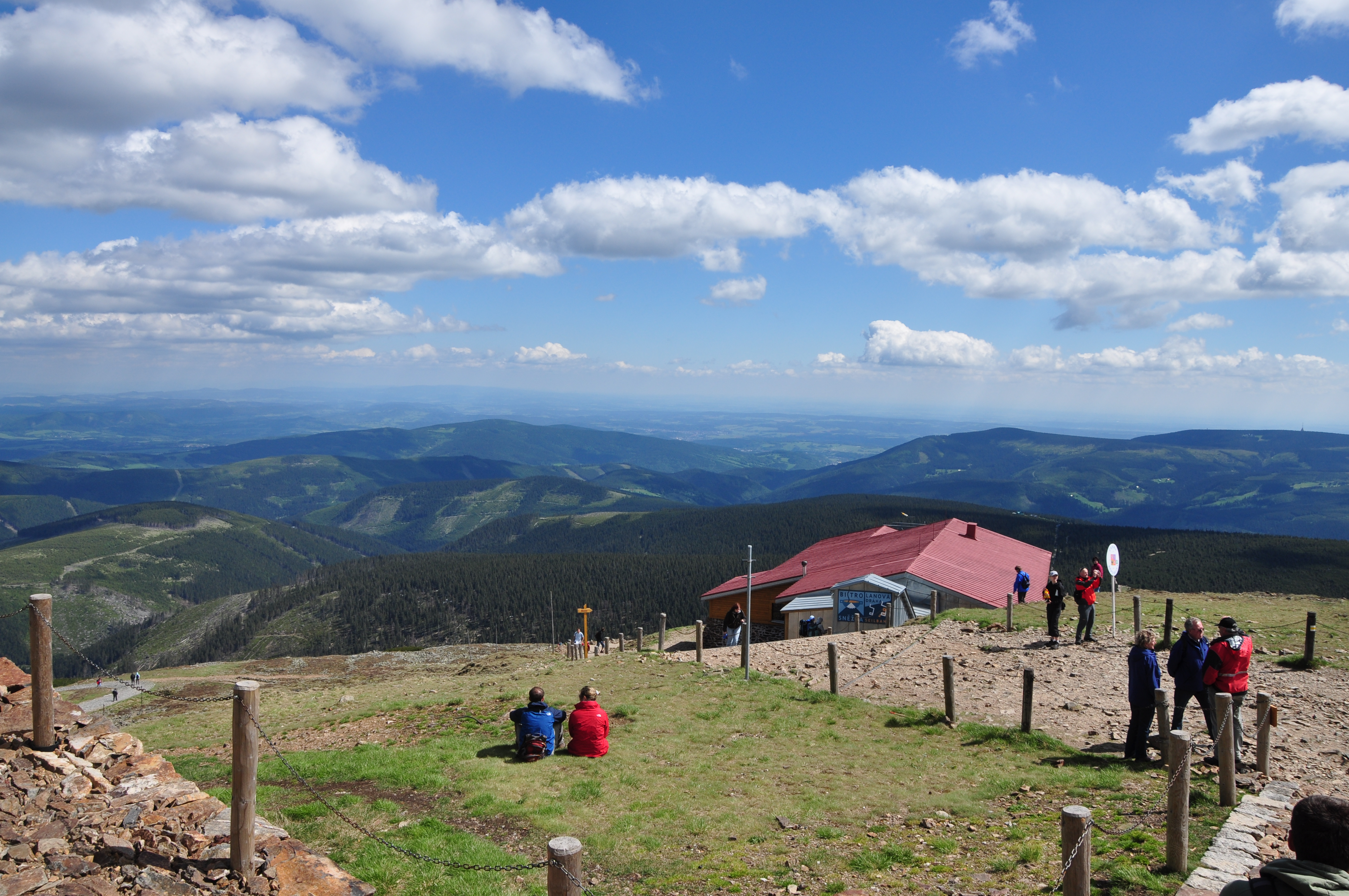
Chairlift station atop Sněžka

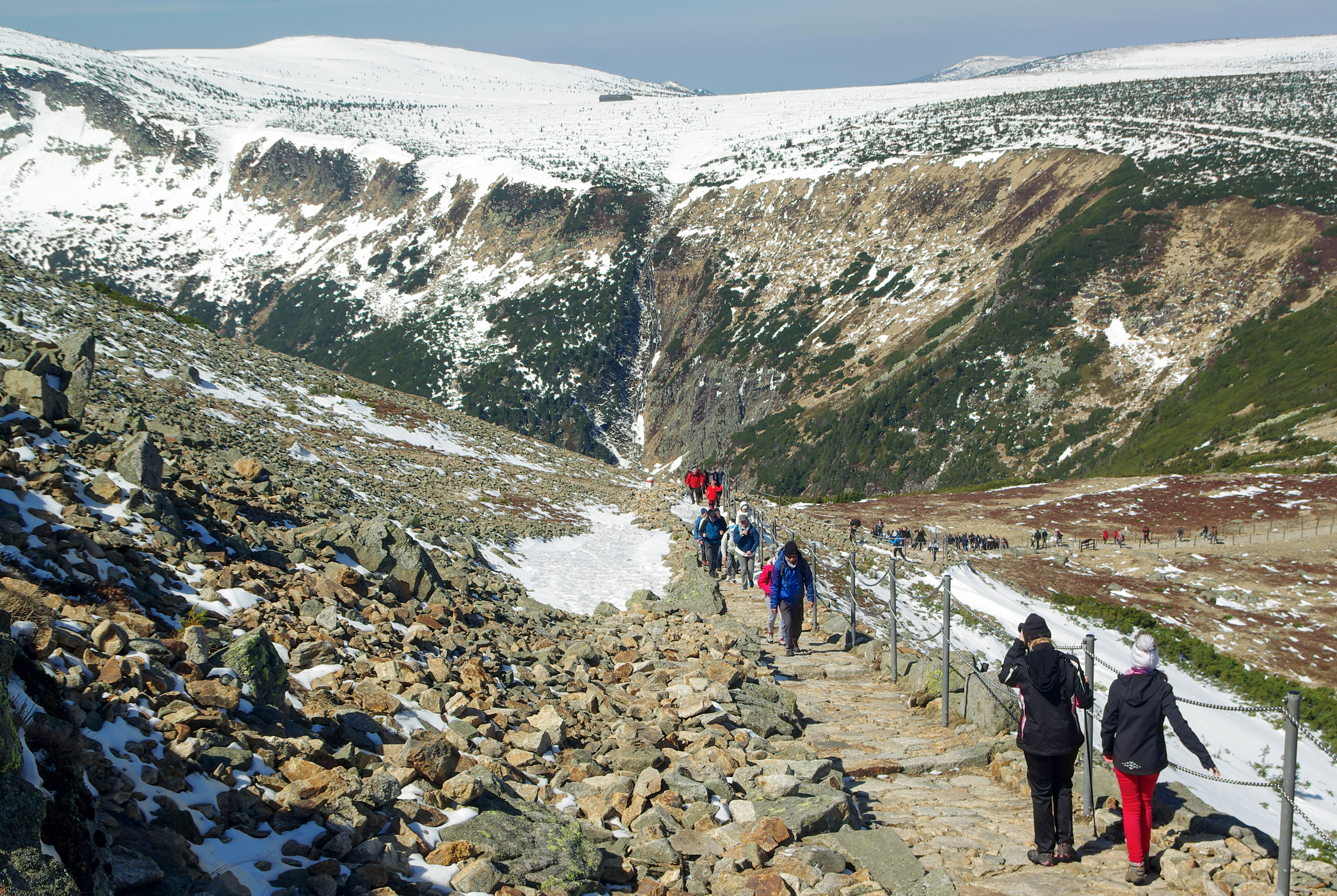
Mountain trail

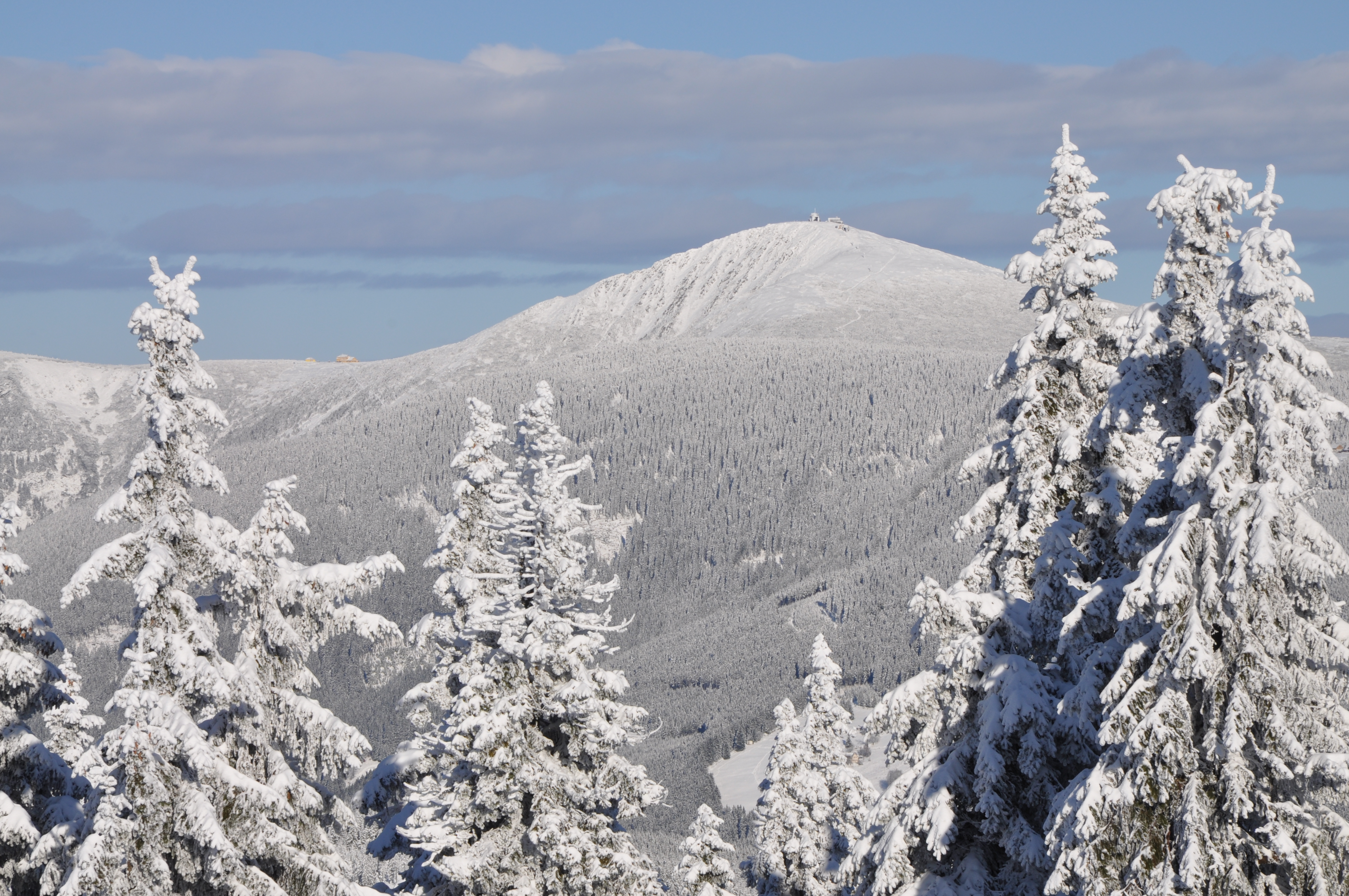
View of the mountain in winter

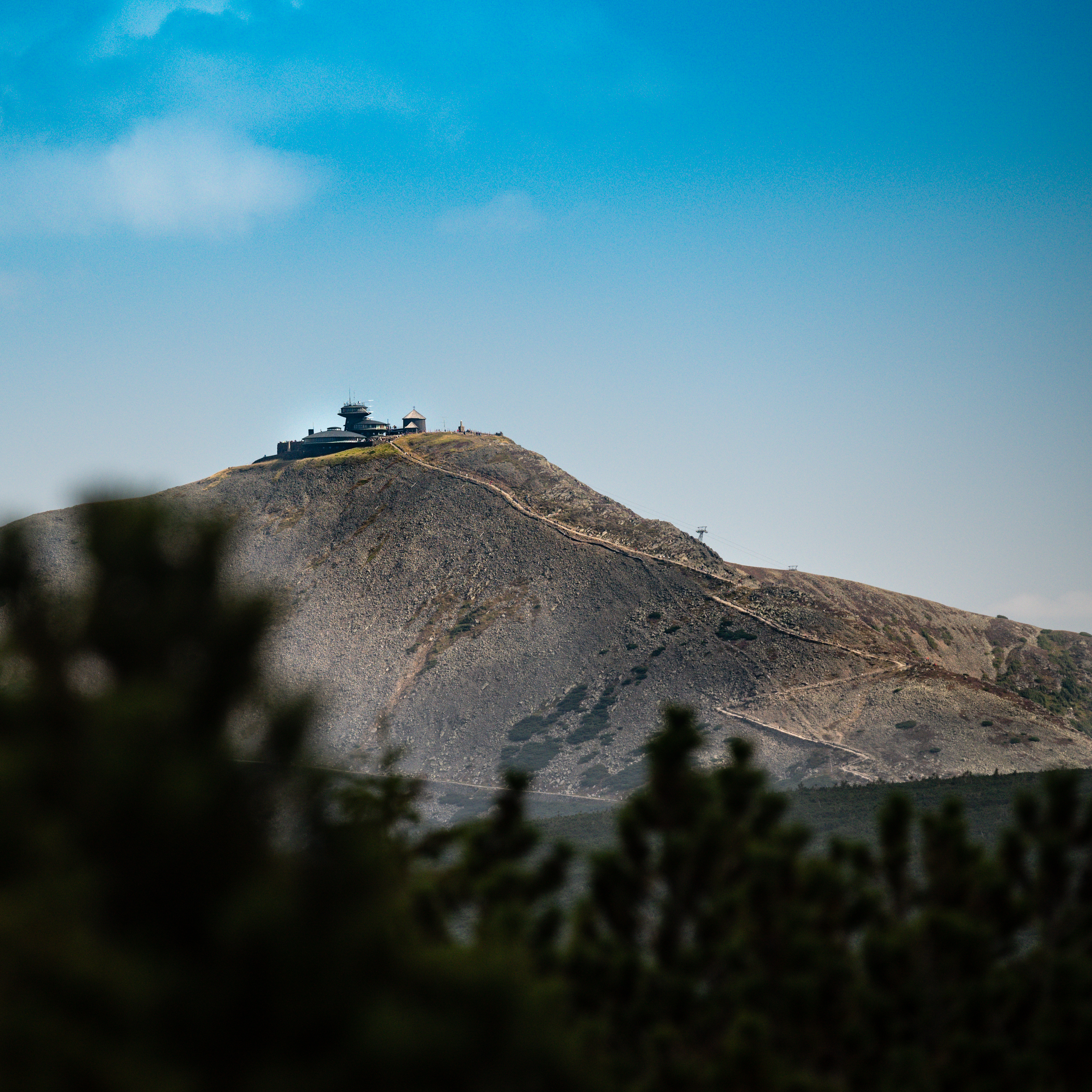
West view

== See also ==
- Polish–Czech Friendship Trail
- List of mountains in Poland
