= St. Lawrence's Chapel, Sněžka =

Catholic chapel in Poland

Coordinates: 50.7360°N 15.7398°E

St. Lawrence's Chapel
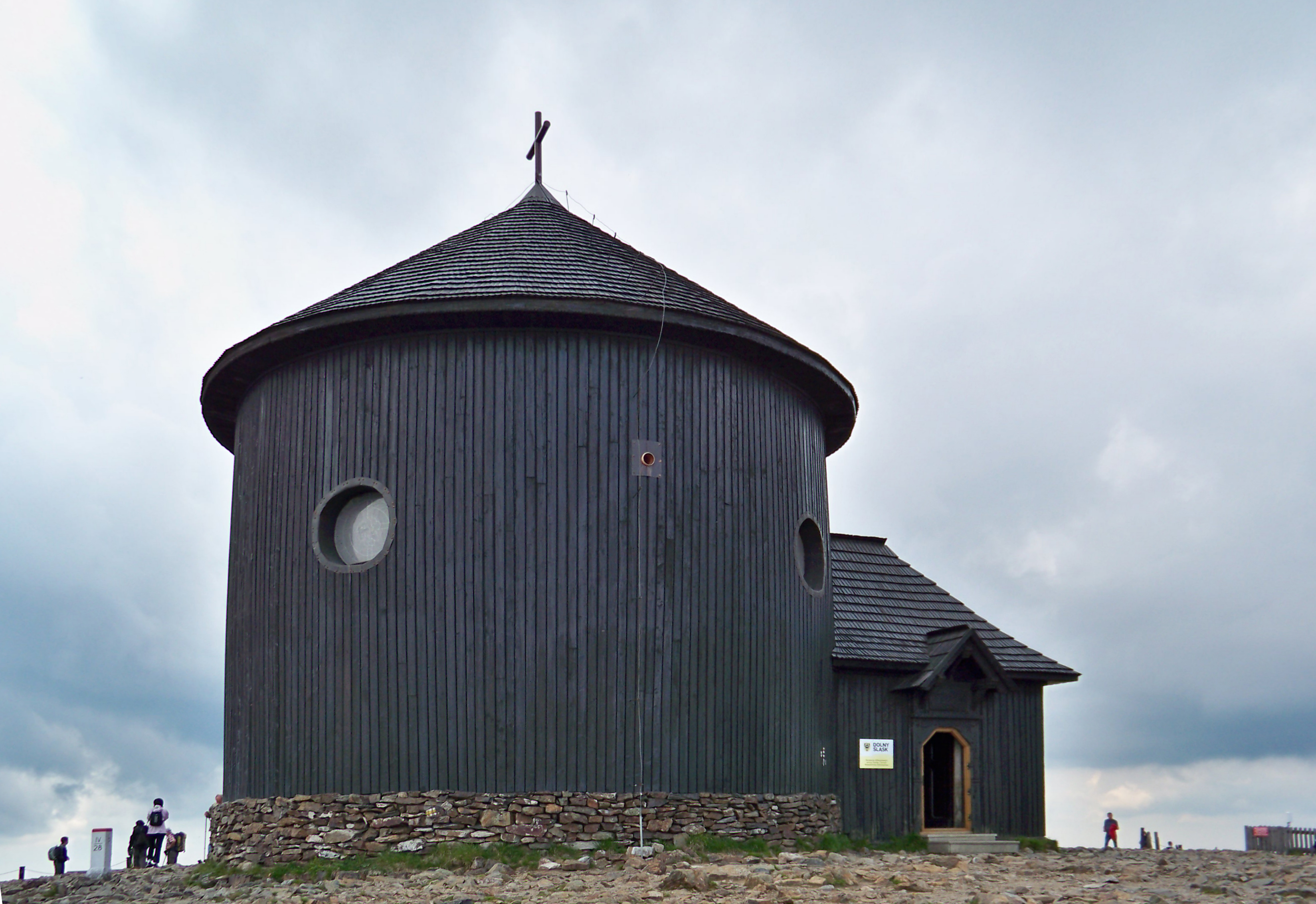

Religion
- Affiliation: Roman Catholicism
- Status: active church

Location
- Location: Karpacz, Poland
- Interactive map of St. Lawrence's Chapel

Architecture
- Architect: Bartłomiej Nantwig from Gryfów Śląski
- Type: Baroque
- Groundbreaking: 1665
- Completed: 1681

St. Lawrence's Chapel (Polish: kaplica św. Wawrzyńca, Czech: kaple sv. Vavřince) is a Roman Catholic chapel located on the peak of Sněžka mountain of the Giant Mountains in Poland. The chapel is located around 5 kilometres (3 mi) west of the centre of Karpacz, next to the Czech–Polish state border.

== History ==
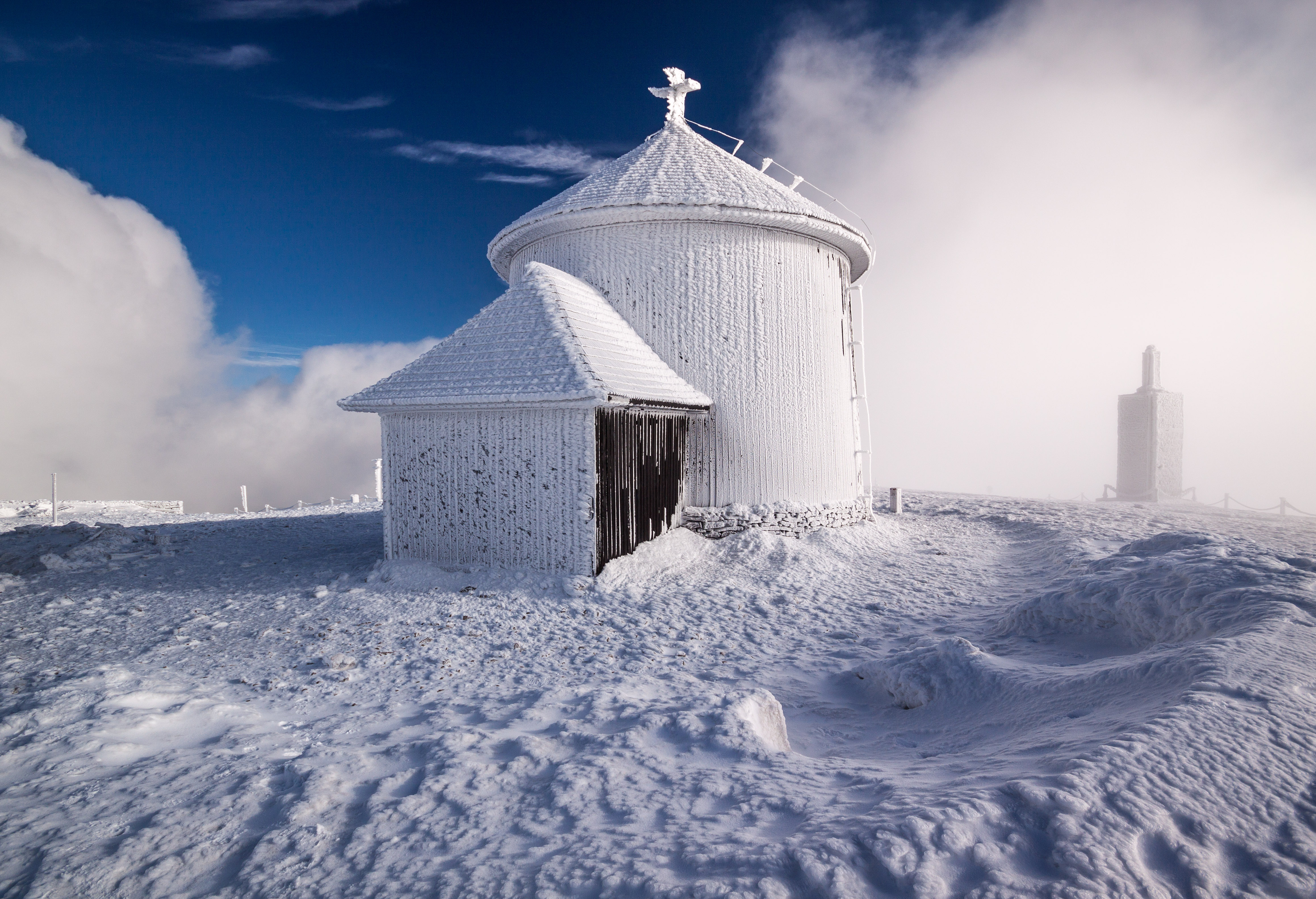
St. Lawrence's Chapel in winter

The construction of the chapel was founded by Count Christof Leopold von Schaffgotsch, as a votive offering to the confiscated wealth of his father. The building of the chapel on Sněžka was done so to enforce his right to the mountain, which was impeached by Count Czernin. The construction of the chapel on the peak of Sněžka began in 1665. The construction works were led by architect Bartłomiej Nantwig from Gryfów Śląski. To build the foundation of the chapel, 4.5 metres of debris was removed, together with rock scree to get to a resistant rock base. The chapel was completed in 1681, with the chapel's altar taken from Krzeszów. The chapel was consecrated on August 10, St. Lawrence's Day, in 1681, by the Abbot of Krzeszów Abbey, Bernard Rosa. A regular mass service took place in the chapel until 1810. The chapel on Sněžka was the first filial church in Miłków, referenced in a visitation protocol in 1687. The Cistercians took control of the chapel until the secularisation of law in 1810. Between 1810 and 1850, the chapel lost its sacramental function, during which the Baroque altar was moved to St. Anne's Chapel in Sosnówka. The building began to function as a mountain hut. The chapel was restored in 1850, by Friedrich Sommer, which returned the chapel's sacramental function. The chapel was re-consecrated in 1850, by Bishop of Wrocław Heinrich Förster. The regularity of sacramental practices was also restored. In 1981, the chapel celebrated its 300-year, with its construction unchanged to the present day.
