= Struznica =

Struznica may refer to:

- Strużnica, village in Lower Silesian Voivodeship, Poland
- Stružnica, settlement in the Municipality of Stružnica, Slovenia
