= Krogulec =

Krogulec may refer to:

- Krogulec, Lower Silesian Voivodeship in Gmina Mysłakowice, Jelenia Góra County in Lower Silesian Voivodeship (SW Poland)
- Krogulec, Świętokrzyskie Voivodeship, in Świętokrzyskie Voivodeship, Poland
- Krogulec, Jizera Mountains in the Jizera Mountains, Poland
