= Erdmannsdorf =

Erdmannsdorf may refer to:

- Erdmannsdorf (Augustusburg), a village near the town of Augustusburg in Saxony, Germany
- Erdmannsdorf-Zillerthal, a village in Poland now known as Mysłakowice
