= Łomnica, Karkonosze County =

Łomnica
- Village
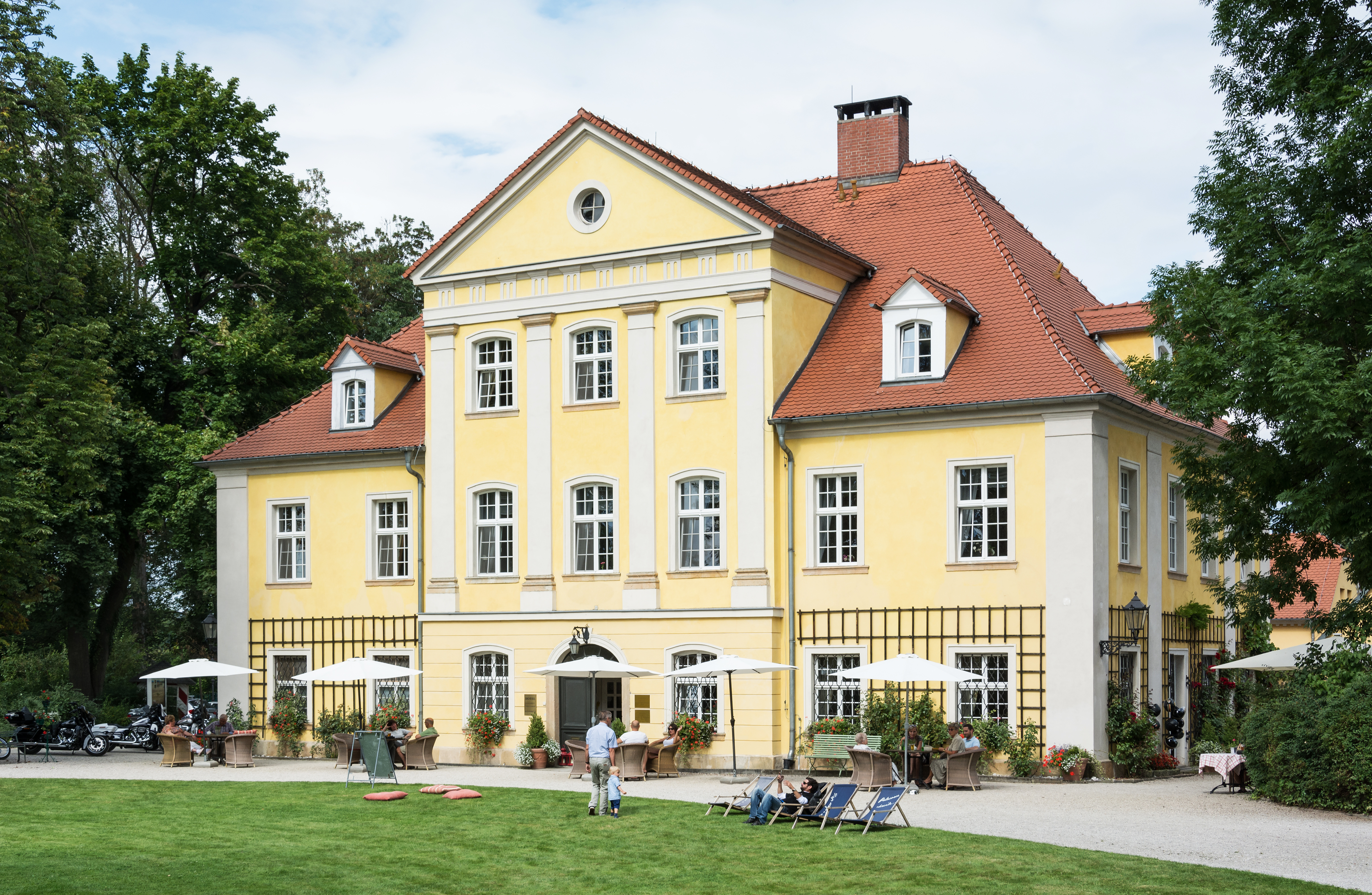
- Hotel Palace in Łomnica

- Location within Poland
- Coordinates: 50°51′53″N 15°47′45″E
- Country: Poland
- Voivodeship: Lower Silesian
- County: Karkonosze
- Gmina: Mysłakowice

Population
  - Total: 2,000
- Time zone: UTC+1 (CET)
  - Summer (DST): UTC+2 (CEST)
- Vehicle registration: DJE

Łomnica [wɔmˈnit͡sa] is a village in the administrative district of Gmina Mysłakowice, within Karkonosze County, Lower Silesian Voivodeship, in south-western Poland. It is the location of the Baroque Łomnica Palace.

== Etymology ==
The name is of Polish origin, and is derived from the words łom or łomnica, which in turn come from the word łamać, meaning "to break".
