= Bukowiec, Karkonosze County =

Bukowiec
- Village
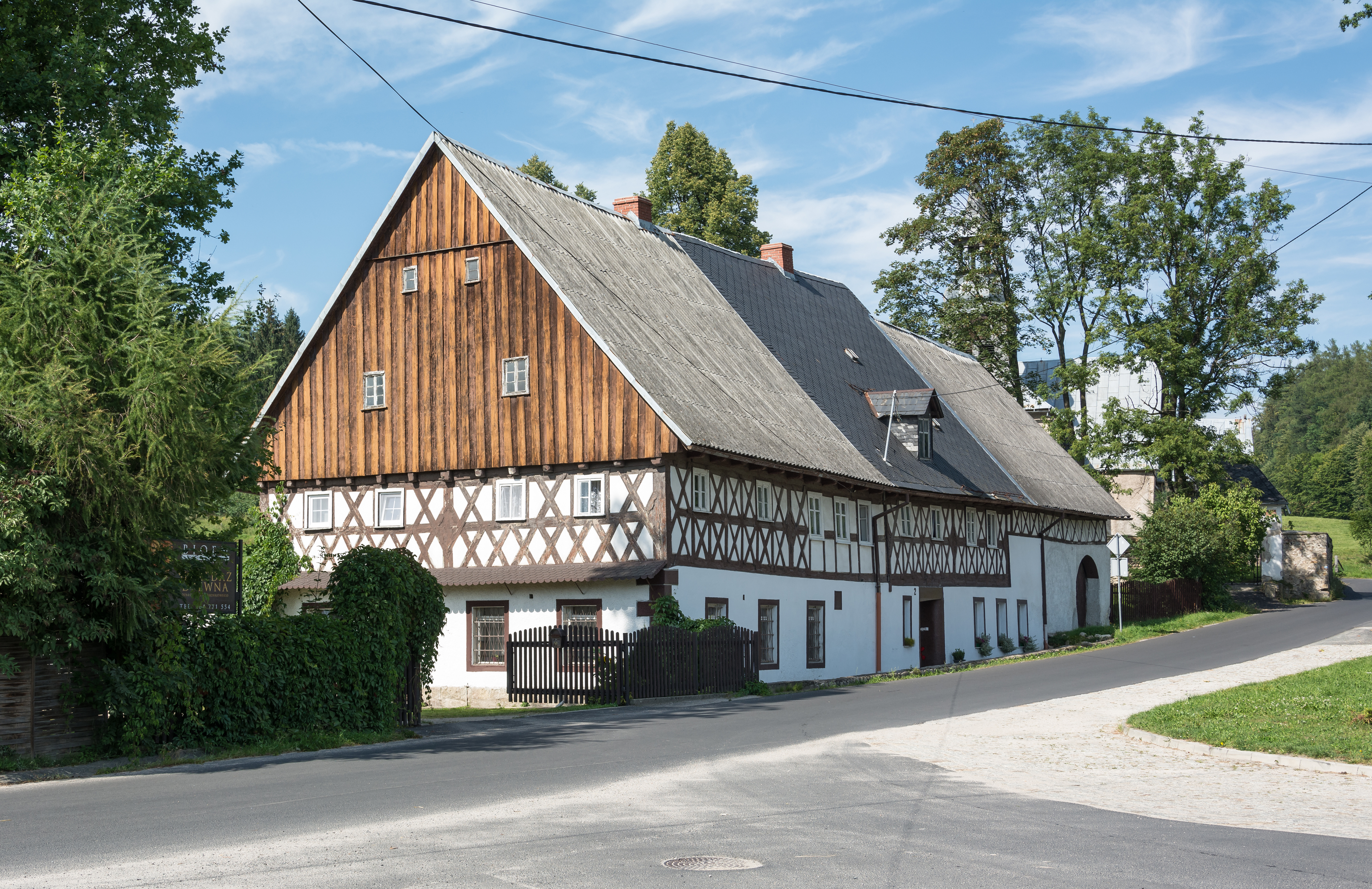

- Location within Poland
- Coordinates: 50°49′28″N 15°49′1″E
- Country: Poland
- Voivodeship: Lower Silesian
- Powiat: Karkonosze
- Gmina: Mysłakowice
- Population: 710
- Time zone: UTC+1 (CET)
  - Summer (DST): UTC+2 (CEST)

Bukowiec [buˈkɔvjɛt͡s] is a village in the administrative district of Gmina Mysłakowice, within Karkonosze County, Lower Silesian Voivodeship, in south-western Poland.

The landmarks of Bukowiec are the Gothic Saint Martin church, the Baroque Saint John the Baptist church, and the Neoclassical palace complex with an adjacent park and an observation tower.

During World War II the Germans established and operated a subcamp of the Gross-Rosen concentration camp at the local sanatorium, whose prisoners were Jews.

== Notable residents ==
- Horst Brünner (1929–2008), Deputy Defense Minister in the East German Council of Ministers and chief of the Central Political Administration of the National People's Army

== Gallery ==
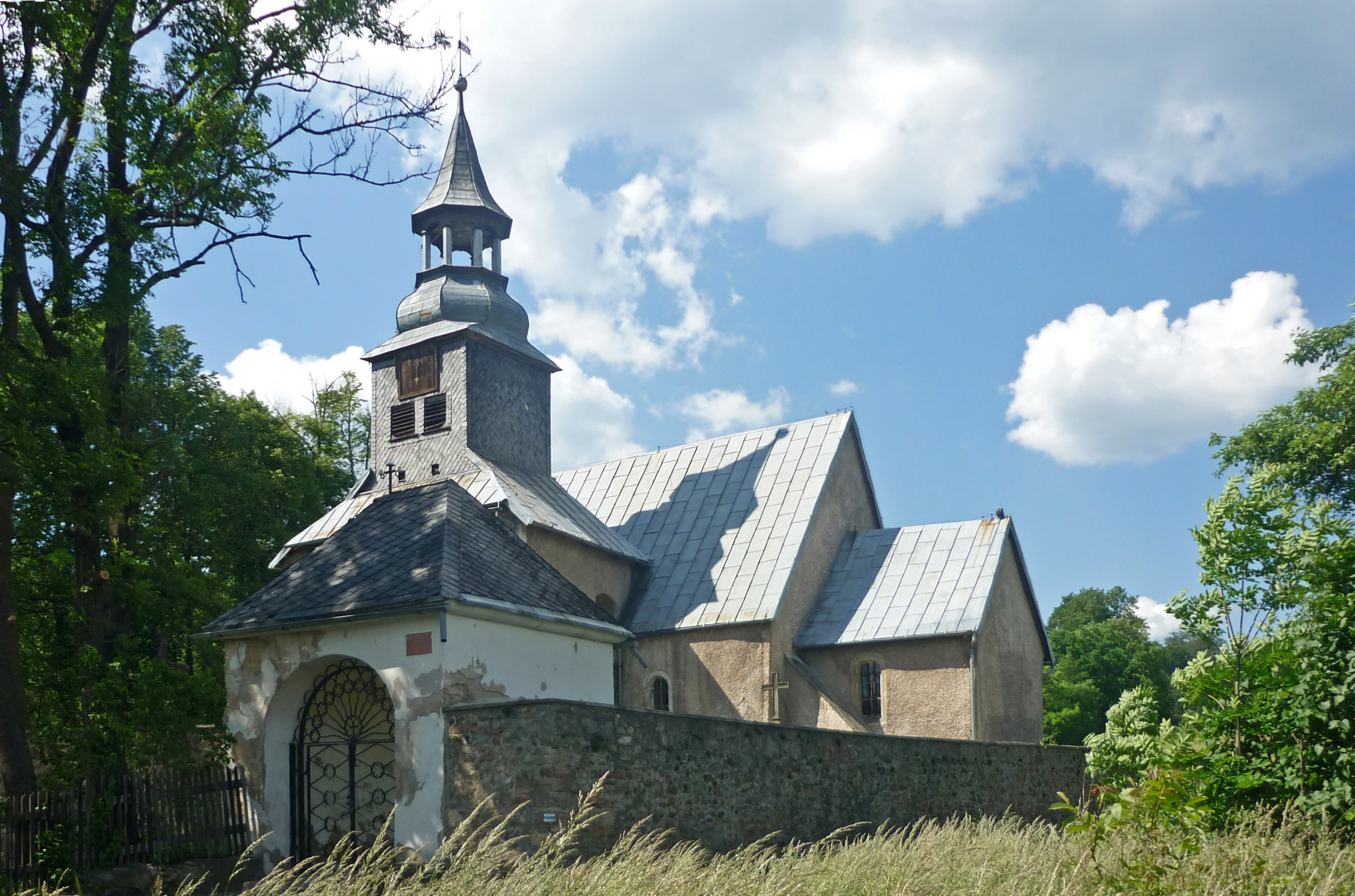
Saint Martin church

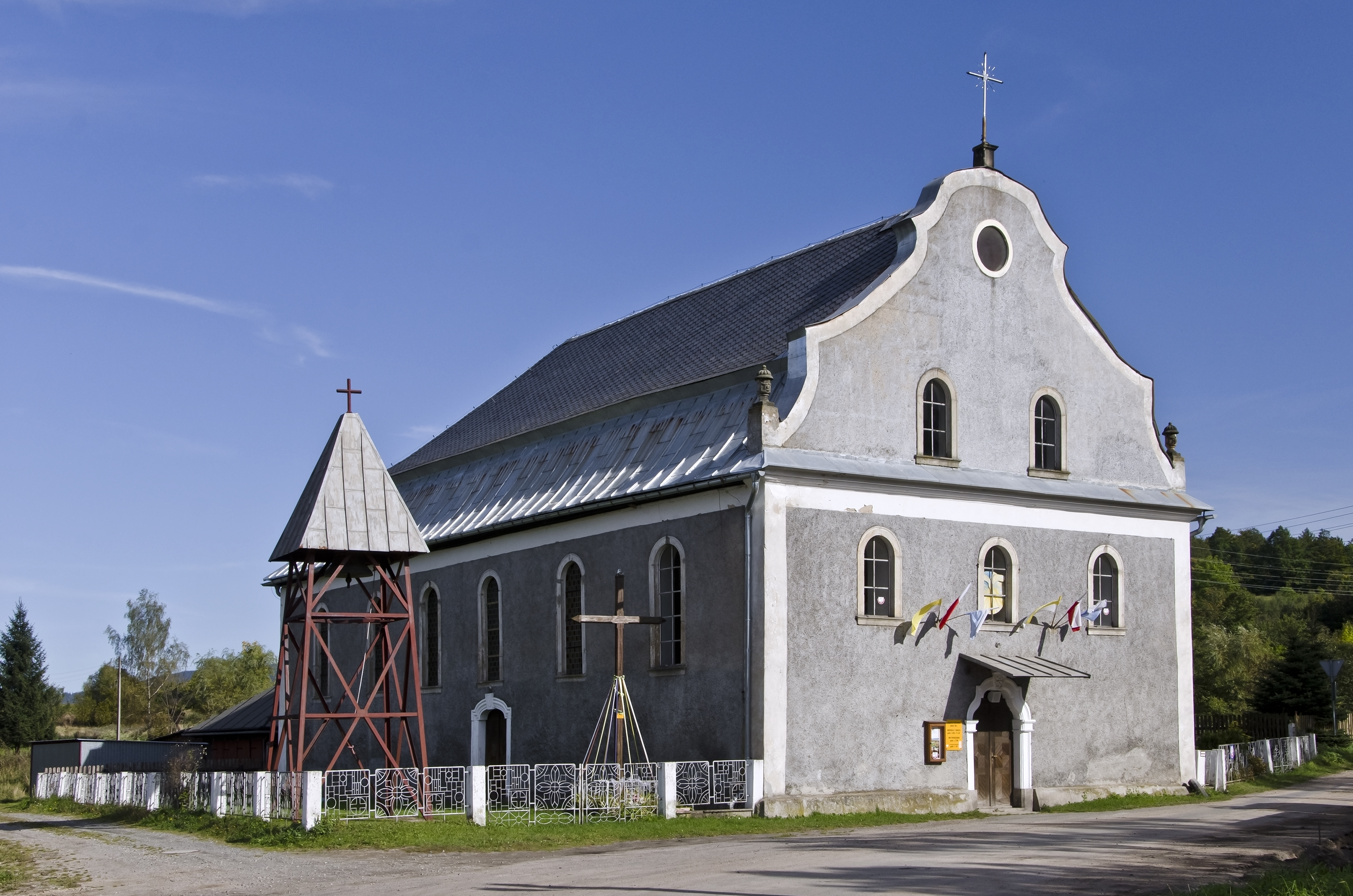
Saint John the Baptist church

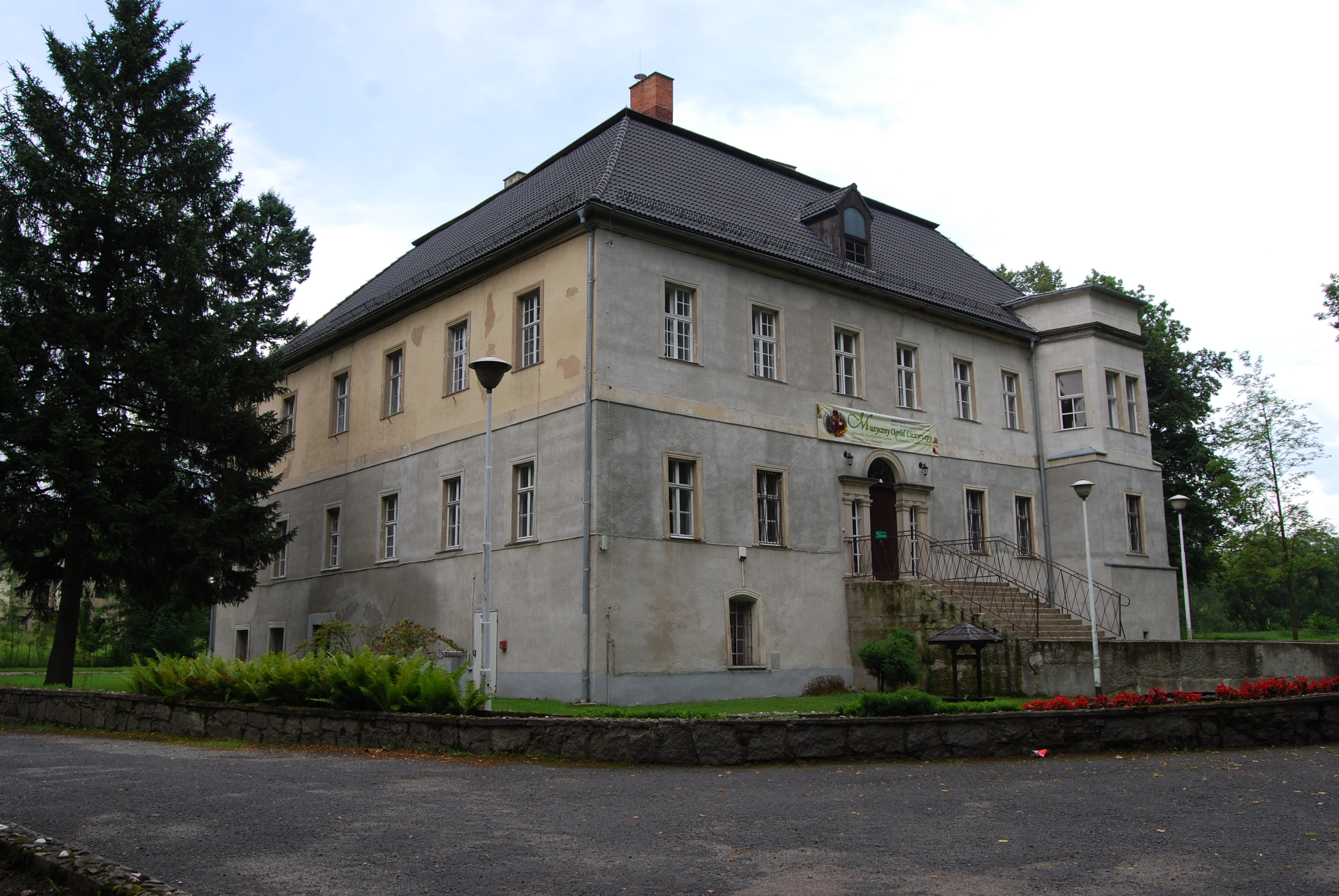
Palace

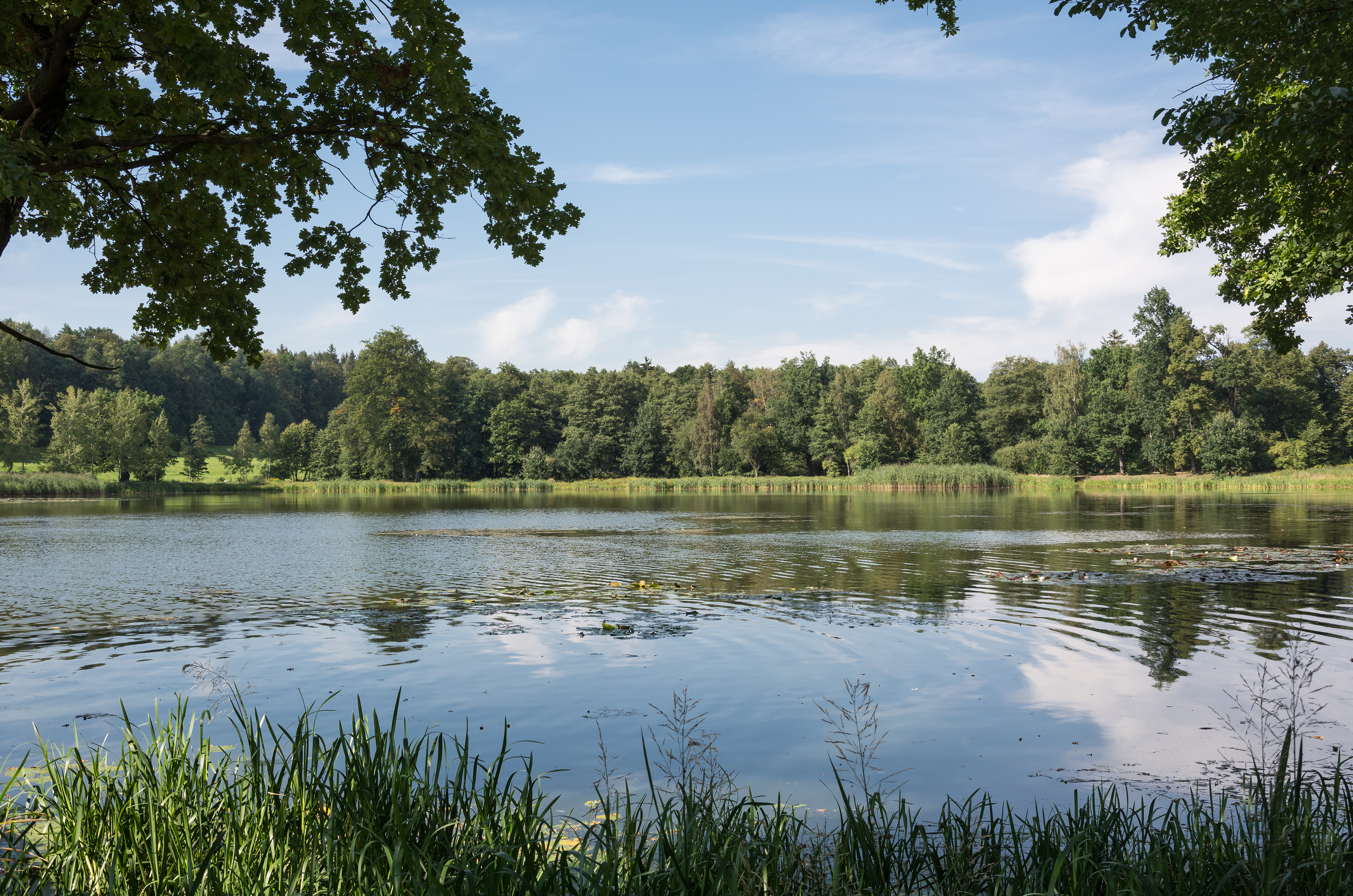
Kąpielnik pond
