= Dąbrowica, Karkonosze County =

Dąbrowica
- Village
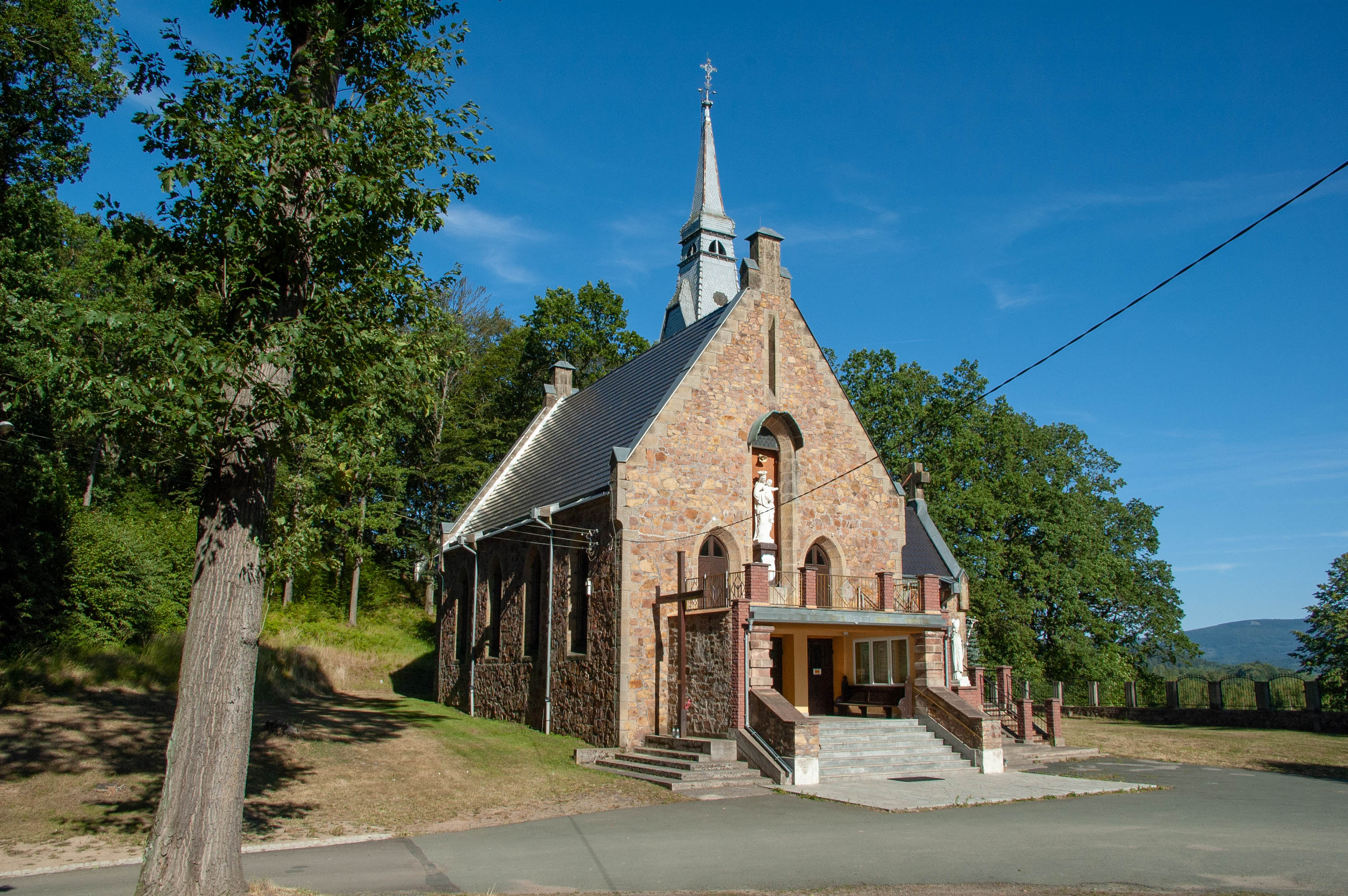
- Church of Our Lady of Częstochowa

- Location within Poland
- Coordinates: 50°53′43″N 15°48′42″E
- Country: Poland
- Voivodeship: Lower Silesian
- Powiat: Karkonosze
- Gmina: Mysłakowice

Dąbrowica [dɔmbrɔˈvit͡sa] is a village in the administrative district of Gmina Mysłakowice, within Karkonosze County, Lower Silesian Voivodeship, in south-western Poland.

== Gallery ==
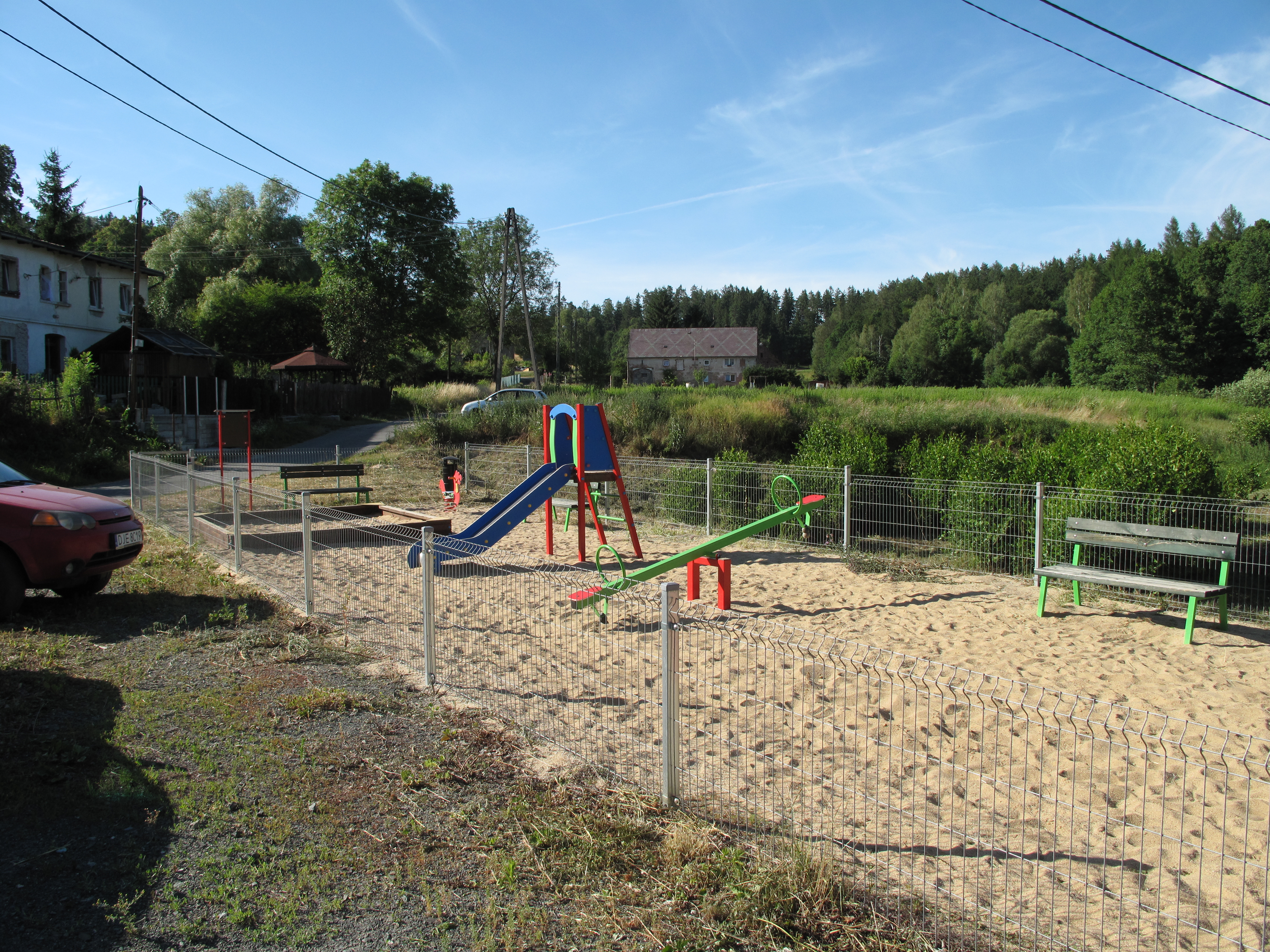
Children's playground

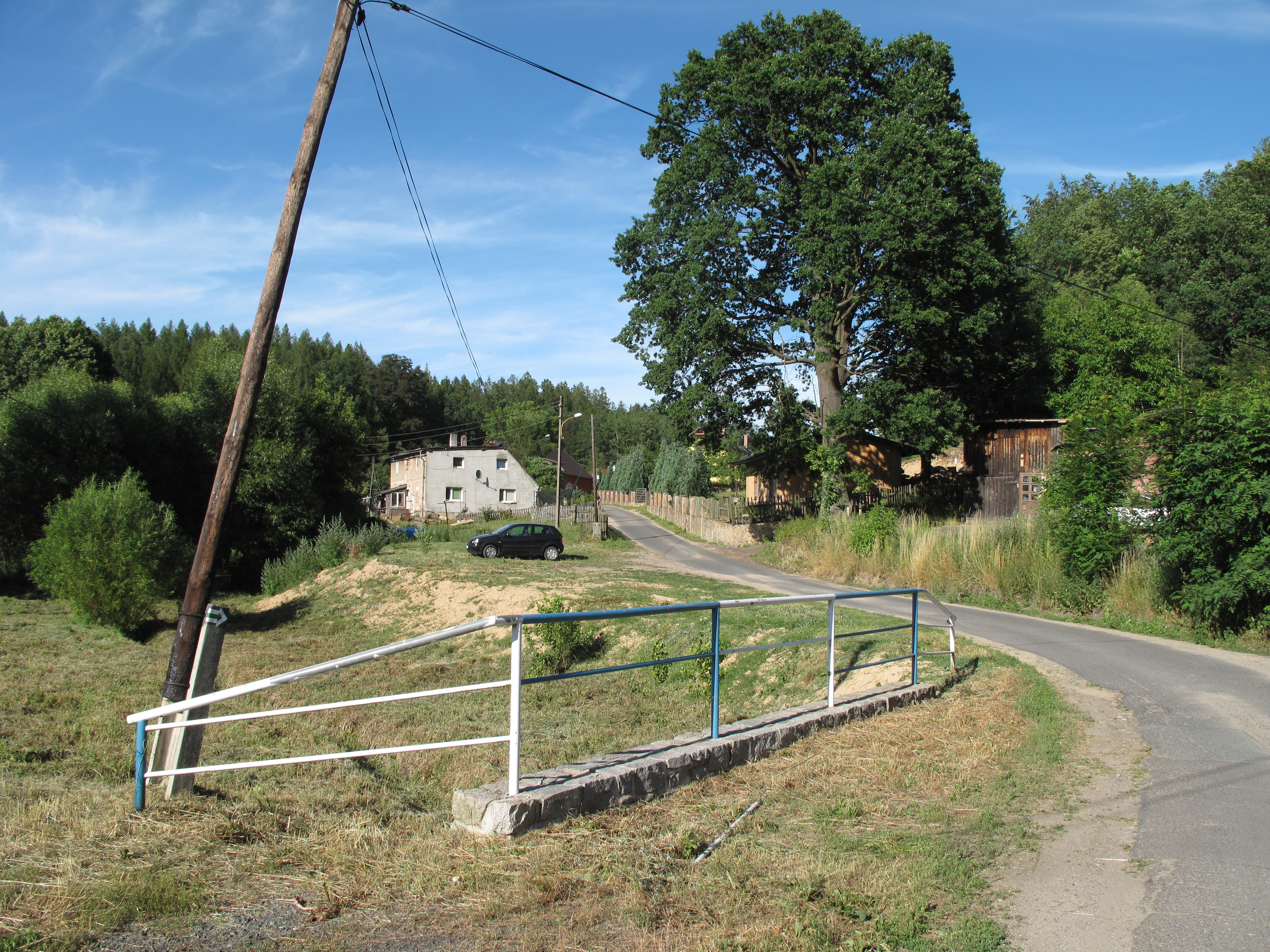
Street

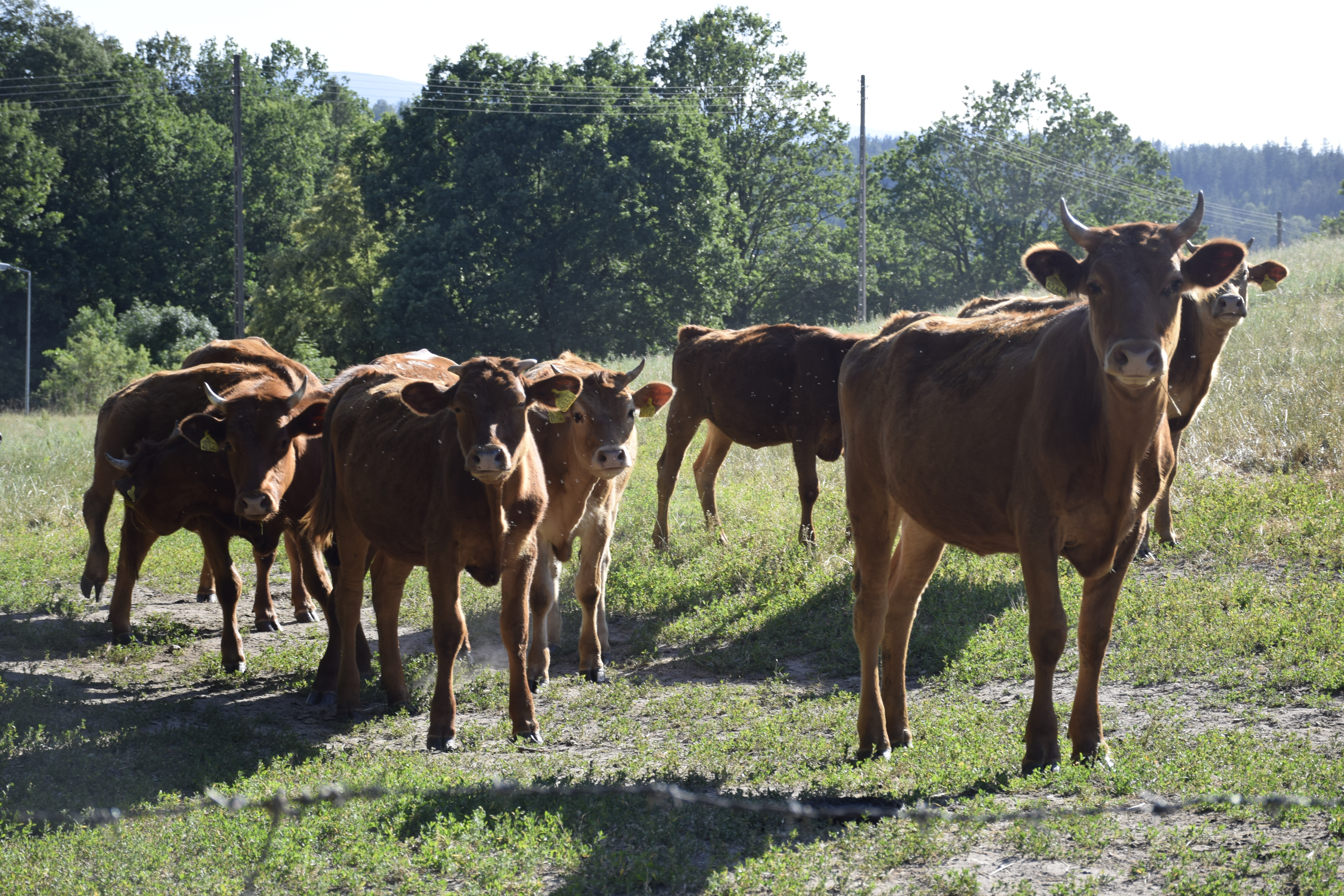
Cattle
