= Gmina Mysłakowice =

Gmina Mysłakowice Mysłakowice Commune
- Gmina
- Flag Coat of arms
- Interactive map of Gmina Mysłakowice
- Coordinates (Mysłakowice): 50°51′N 15°47′E
- Country: Poland
- Voivodeship: Lower Silesian
- County: Karkonosze
- Seat: Mysłakowice
- Sołectwos: Bukowiec, Dąbrowica, Gruszków, Karpniki, Kostrzyca, Krogulec, Łomnica, Mysłakowice, Strużnica, Wojanów

Area
  - Total: 88.75 km^{2} (34.27 sq mi)

Population (2019-06-30)
  - Total: 10,160
  - Density: 114.5/km^{2} (296.5/sq mi)
- Website: http://www.myslakowice.pl

Gmina Mysłakowice is a rural gmina (administrative district) in Karkonosze County, Lower Silesian Voivodeship, in south-western Poland. Its seat is the village of Mysłakowice, which lies approximately 7 kilometres (4 mi) south-east of Jelenia Góra and 94 km (58 mi) west of the regional capital Wrocław.

The gmina covers an area of 88.75 square kilometres (34.27 sq mi), and as of 2019 its total population is 10,160.

== Neighbouring gminas ==
Gmina Mysłakowice is bordered by the towns of Jelenia Góra and Kowary and the gminas of Janowice Wielkie, Kamienna Góra and Podgórzyn.

== Villages ==
The gmina contains the villages of Bukowiec, Dąbrowica, Gruszków, Karpniki, Kostrzyca, Krogulec, Łomnica, Mysłakowice, Strużnica and Wojanów.
