= Gruszków, Lower Silesian Voivodeship =

Gruszków
- Village
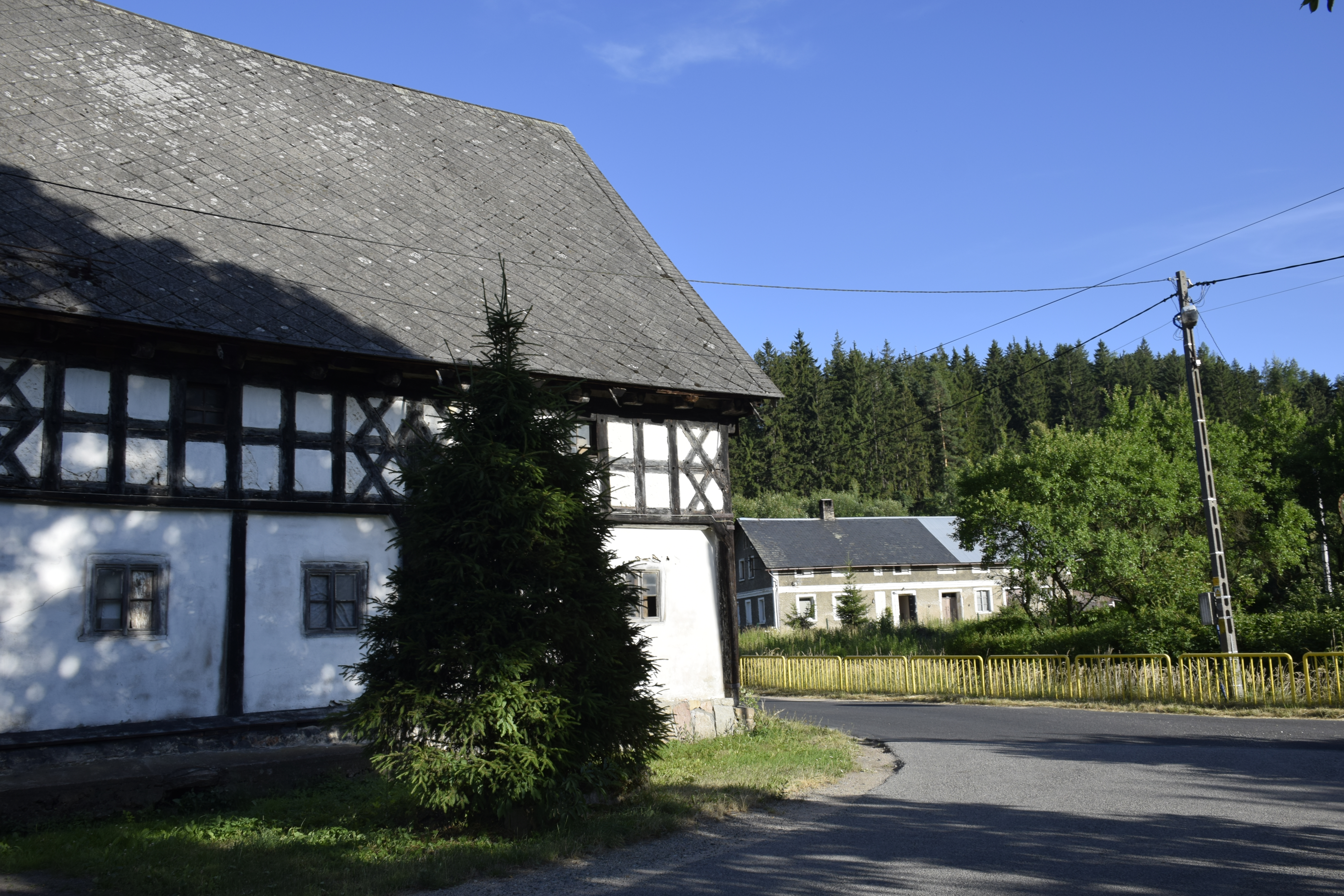
- House by the road

- Location within Poland
- Coordinates: 50°49′34″N 15°51′58″E
- Country: Poland
- Voivodeship: Lower Silesian
- Powiat: Karkonosze
- Gmina: Mysłakowice

Gruszków [ˈɡruʂkuf] is a village in the administrative district of Gmina Mysłakowice, within Karkonosze County, Lower Silesian Voivodeship, in south-western Poland.

== Gallery ==
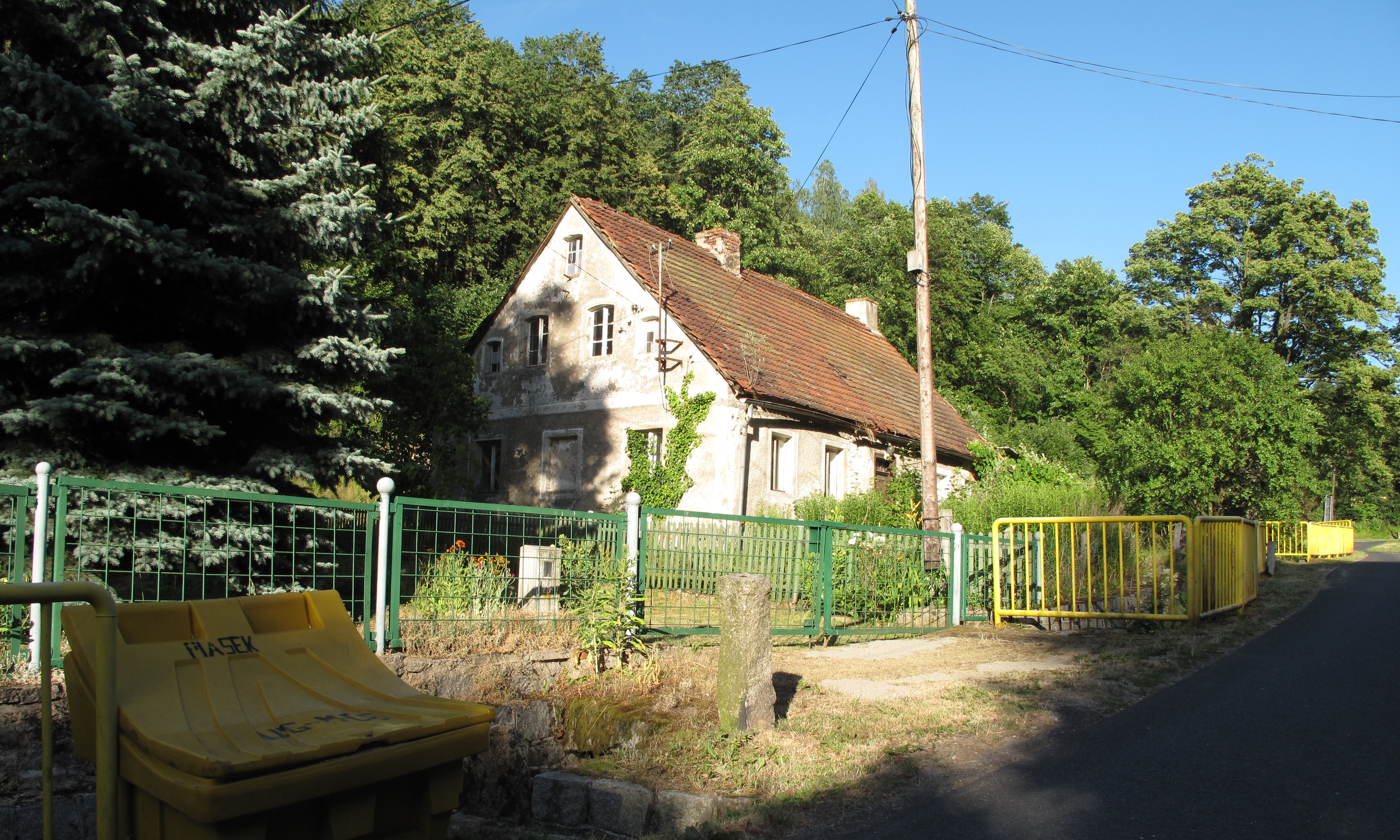
House in the slope

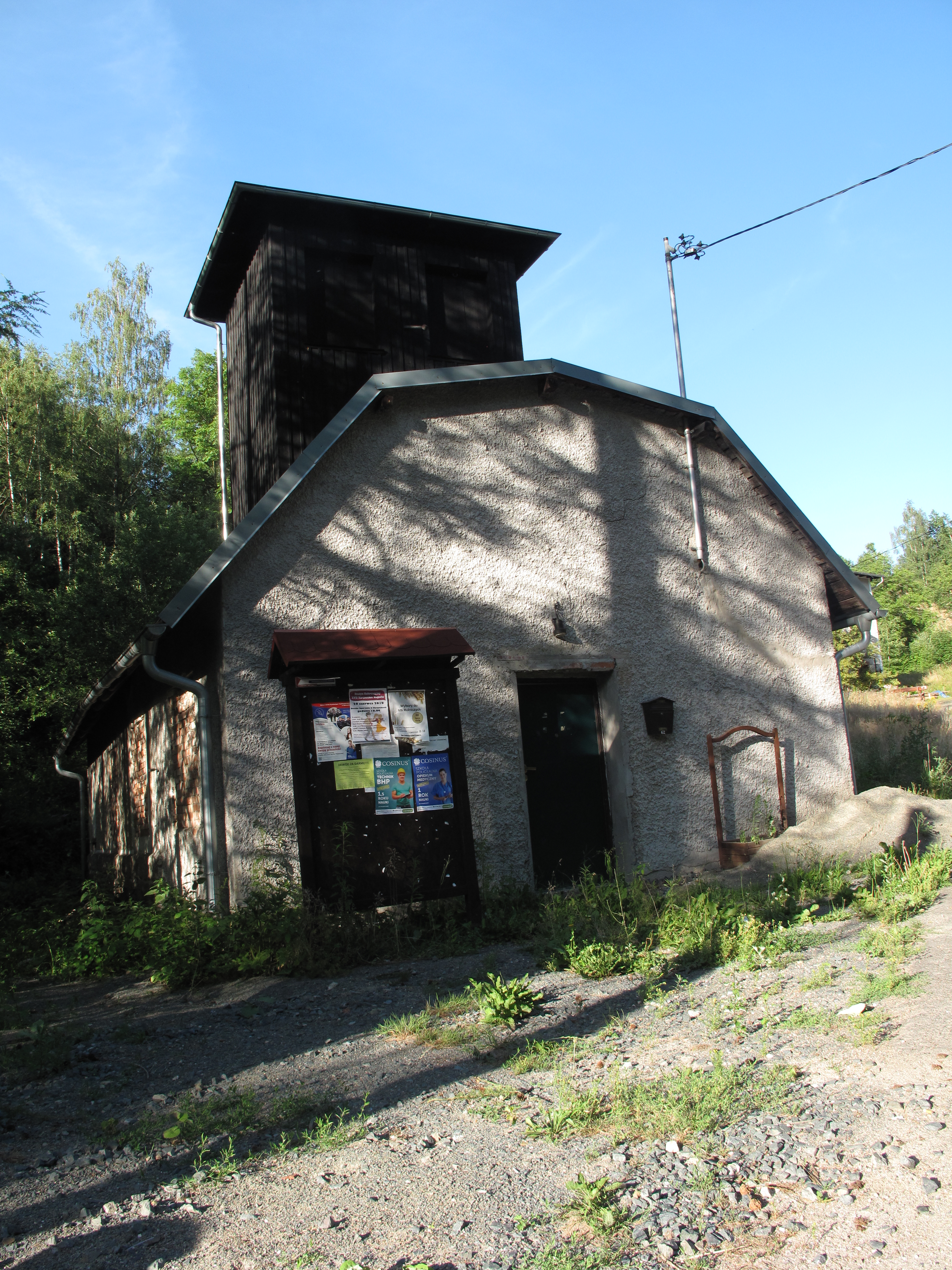
Fire station

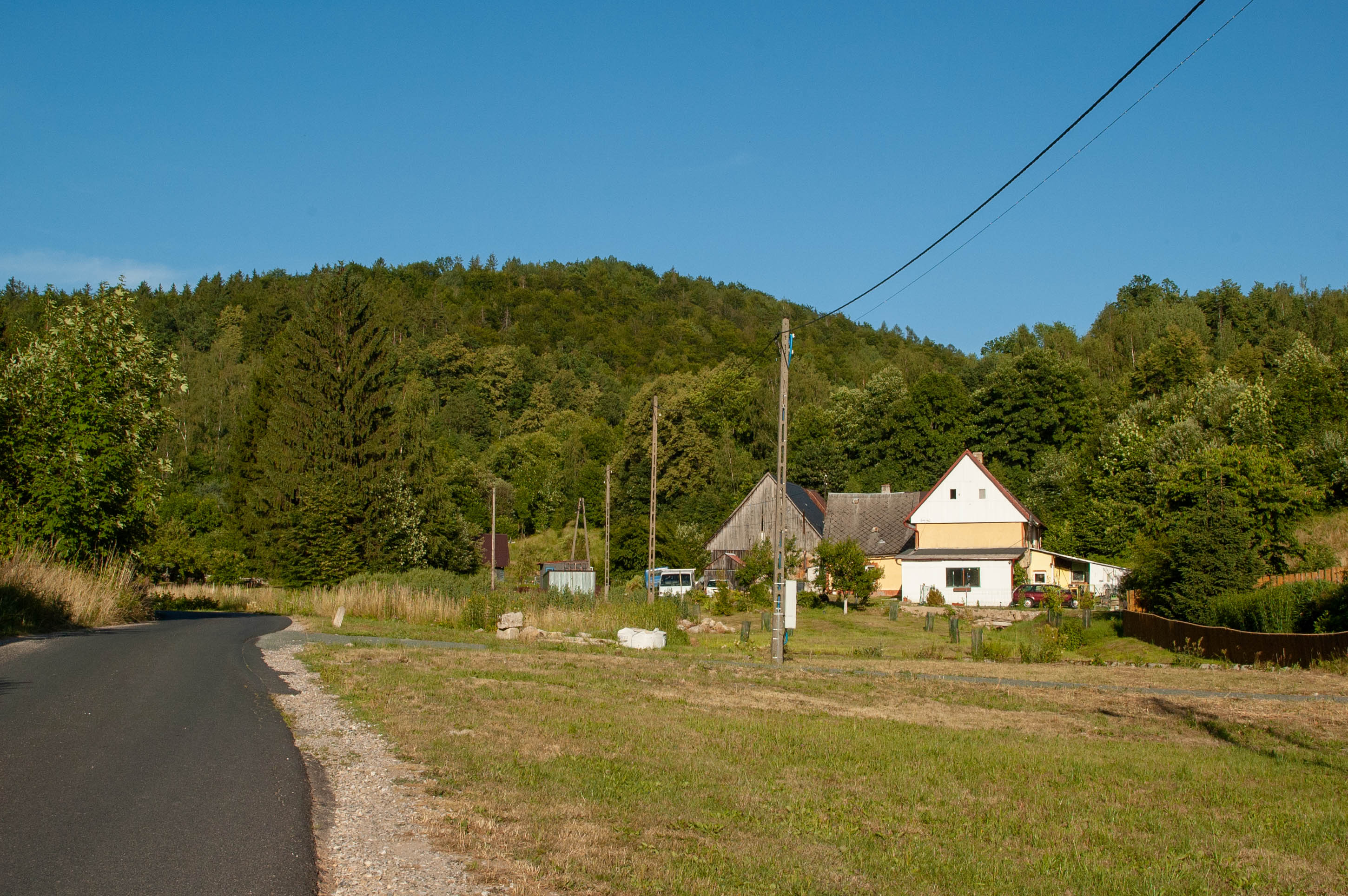
Houses
