= Karpniki =

- Village
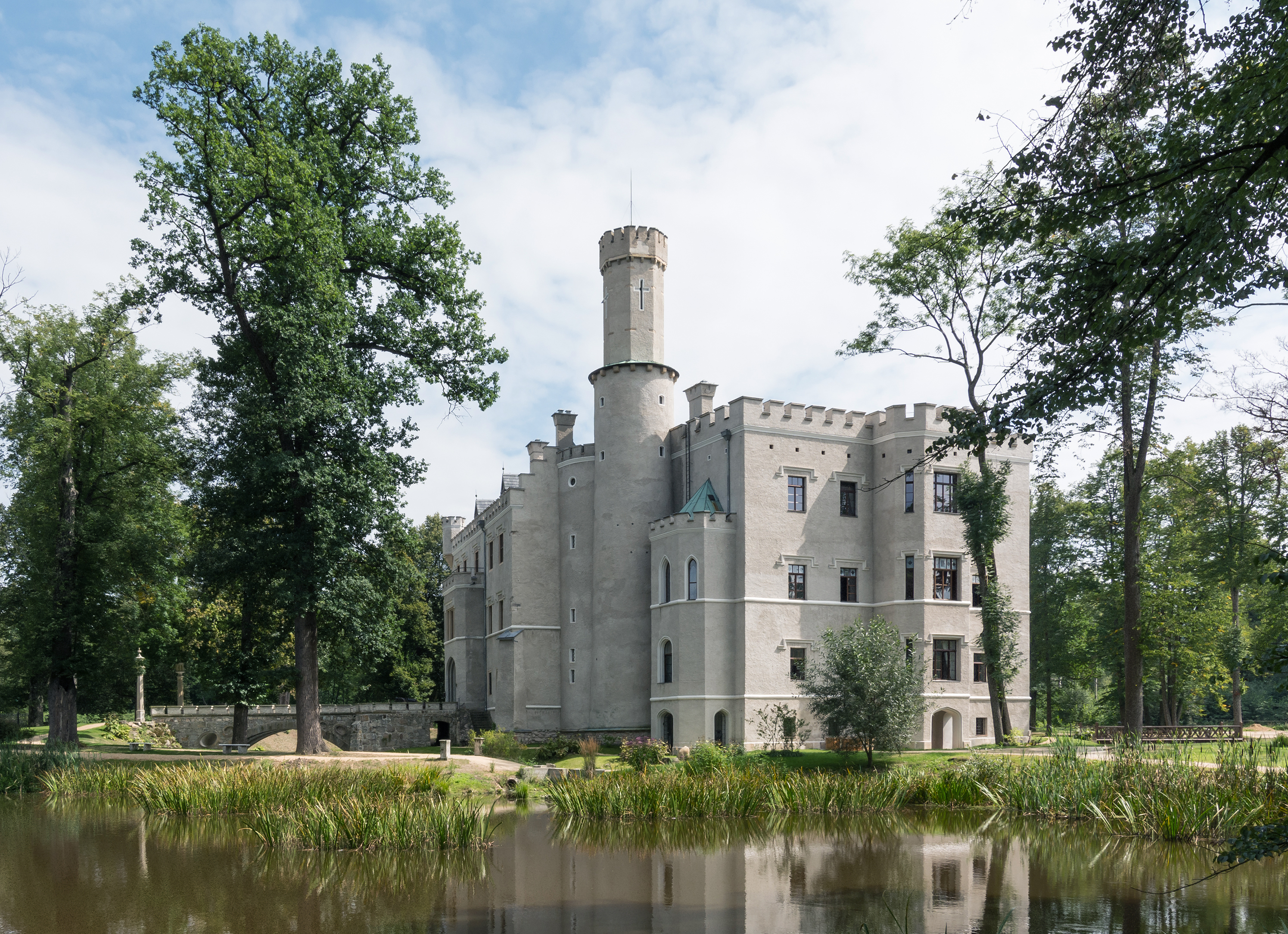
- Karpniki Castle

- Location within Poland
- Coordinates: 50°51′N 15°51′E
- Country: Poland
- Voivodeship: Lower Silesian
- Powiat: Karkonosze
- Gmina: Mysłakowice

Population
  - Total: 810
- Time zone: UTC+1 (CET)
  - Summer (DST): UTC+2 (CEST)
- Vehicle registration: DJE

Karpniki [karpˈniki] is a village in the administrative district of Gmina Mysłakowice, within Karkonosze County, Lower Silesian Voivodeship, in south-western Poland.

== History ==
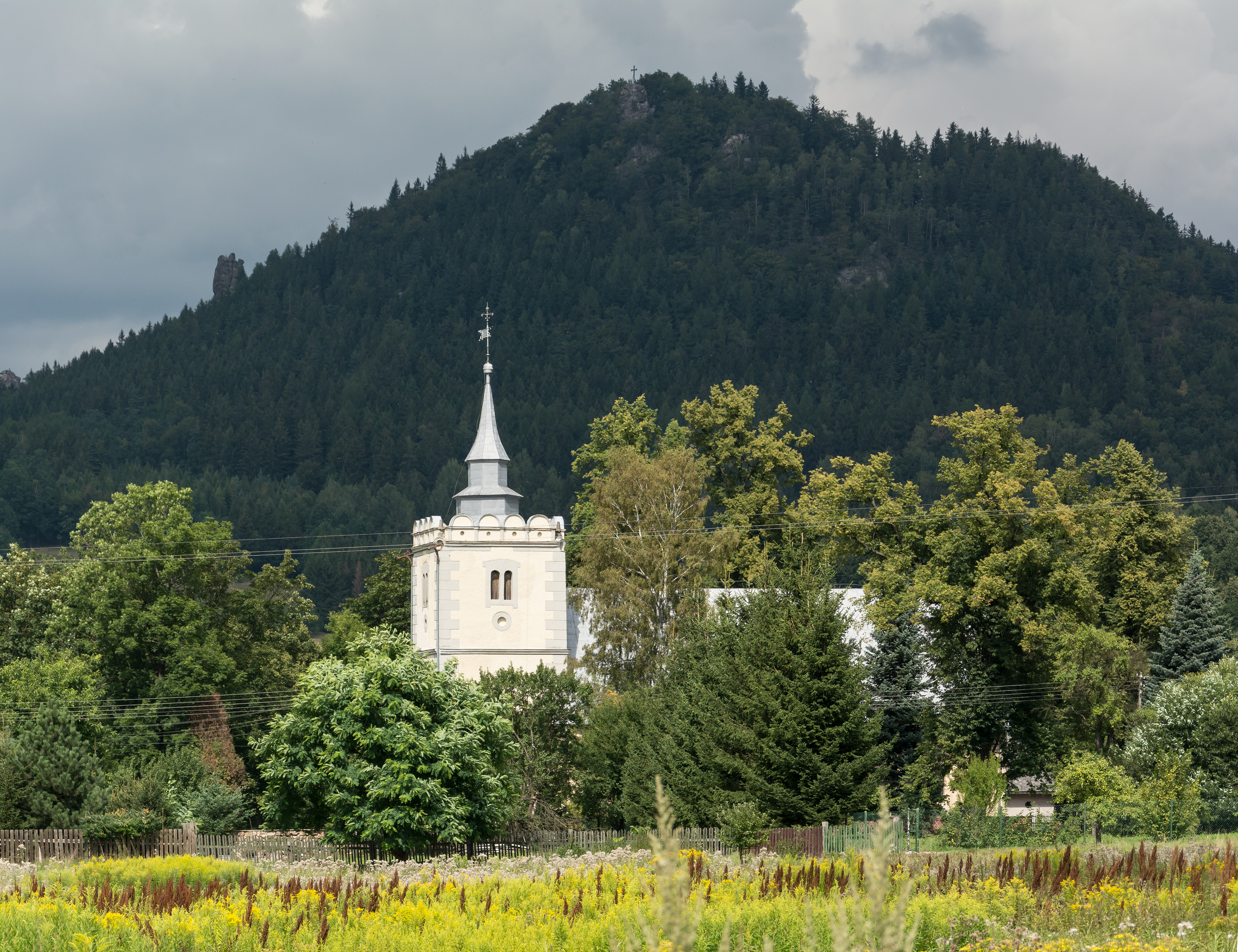
Saint Hedwig church

The area became part of the emerging Polish state in the 10th century. The village was first mentioned in the 13th century, when it was part of fragmented Piast-ruled Poland.

The village is the site of a 15th-century castle that was redecorated in a Neogothic style in 1844 according to the plans of Friedrich August Stüler for Prince Wilhelm of Prussia who had purchased the estate in 1822. His brother, King Frederick William III, visited him several times and in 1831 bought nearby Erdmannsdorf (Mysłakowice) Estate for himself, and in 1839 Wojanów (Schildau) Castle for his daughter Princess Louise of the Netherlands. Jelenia Góra Valley became a royal hideaway. The prince's daughter, Marie of Prussia, had her confirmation in the local Lutheran church in the spring of 1842, with King Frederick William IV and his wife Elisabeth Ludovika of Bavaria being present, as well as their nephew, the Bavarian Crown Prince and later King Maximilian II, Marie's fiancé, whom she married later that year. The following year their first son was born, who became the famous king Ludwig II.

During World War II, the German administration operated two forced labour camps in the village, one for French and Belgian prisoners of war and one for Polish civilians.

In 1946, a Polish folk high school was founded in Karpniki and based in the castle.

== See also ==
- Castles in Poland
