= Wojanów =

- Village
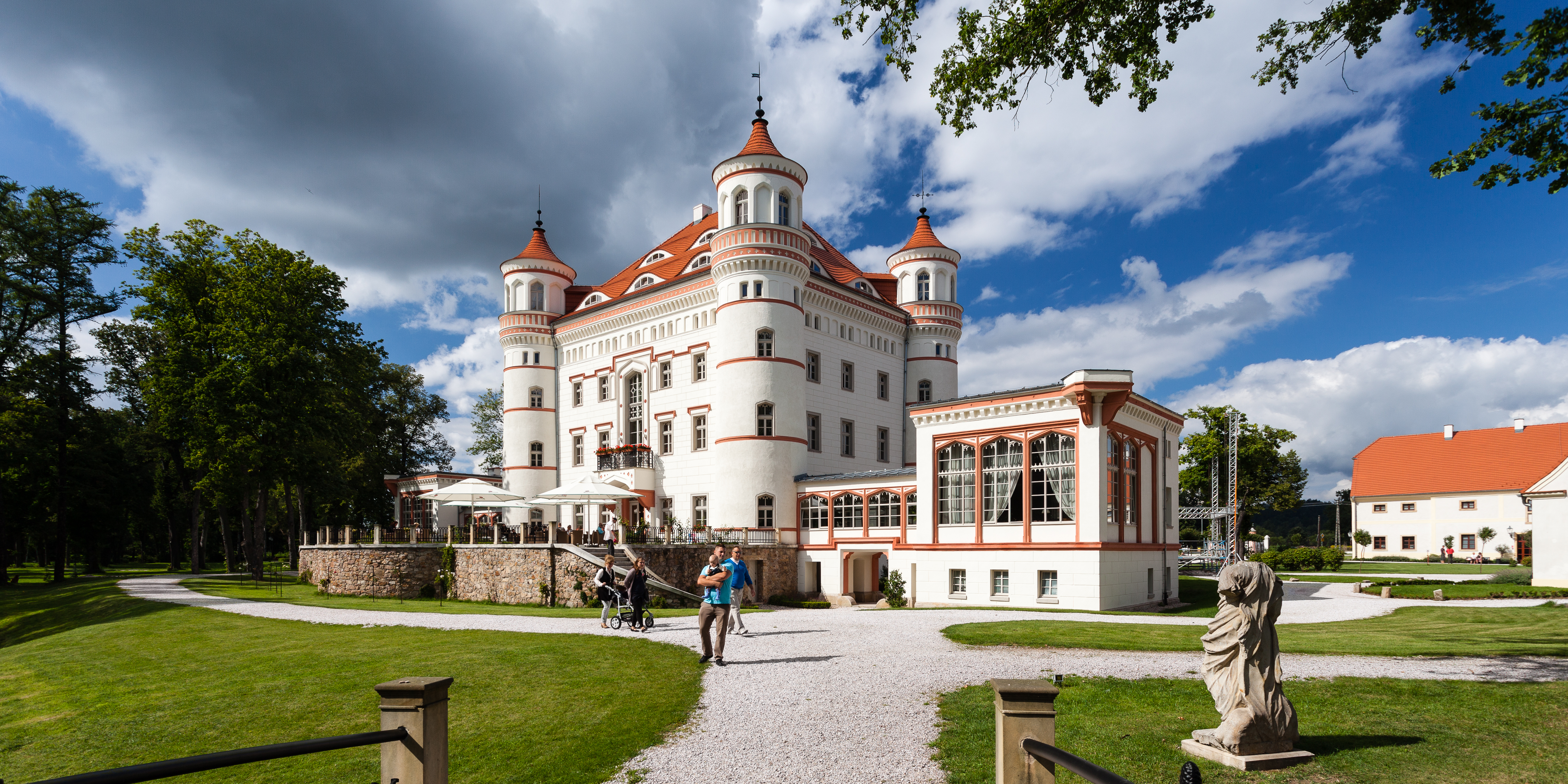
- Palace in Wojanow

- Location within Poland
- Coordinates: 50°52′14″N 15°49′14″E
- Country: Poland
- Voivodeship: Lower Silesian
- Powiat: Karkonosze
- Gmina: Mysłakowice
- First mentioned: 1281
- Time zone: UTC+1 (CET)
  - Summer (DST): UTC+2 (CEST)
- Vehicle registration: DJE

Wojanów ([vɔˈjanuf]) is a village in the administrative district of Gmina Mysłakowice, within Karkonosze County, Lower Silesian Voivodeship, in south-western Poland.

== History ==
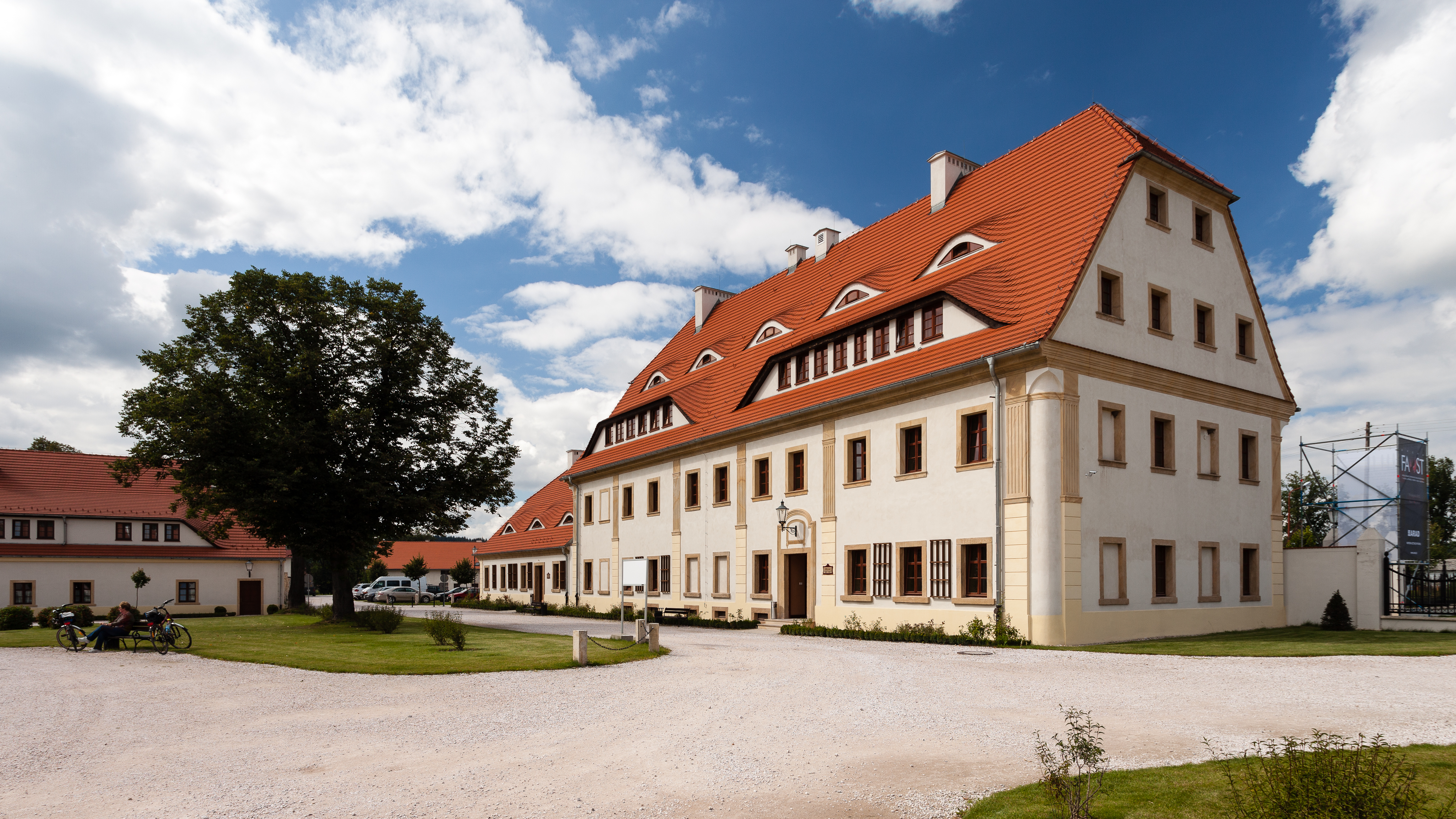
Wojanów Palace outbuildings

The area became part of the emerging Polish state in the 10th century. The village was first mentioned in 1281, when it was part of fragmented Piast-ruled Poland.

Nikolaus von Zedlitz built a new Renaissance Castle in 1603 which was burnt down around 1642 by Swedish troops during the Thirty Years' War. It was reconstructed from 1667 by Christoph von Zedlitz.

In the 18th century, the village was annexed by Prussia. The Jelenia Góra Valley became a royal hideaway when Prince Wilhelm of Prussia, a brother of Prussian king Frederick William III, bought nearby Fischbach (today Karpniki) Castle in 1822. In 1831 the king himself bought Erdmannsdorf (Mysłakowice) estate and in 1839, a year before he died, purchased nearby Schildau Castle (today Wojanów) for his daughter Louise, Princess of the Netherlands who enlarged and redecorated the castle in Tudor Revival architecture. She lived in the Netherlands and at Muskau Castle in Prussia, but during summer holidays often hosted her brother at Wojanów, Frederick William IV and his wife Elisabeth Ludovika of Bavaria, coming over from Erdmannsdorf. Her daughter Marie, wife of William, Prince of Wied, sold Schildau Castle after her husband died in 1907.

During World War II, the German administration operated a forced labour camp for some 200 Poles, Frenchmen, Luxembourgers and Russians in the village.

== Transport ==
There is a railway station in Wojanów.

== Gallery ==
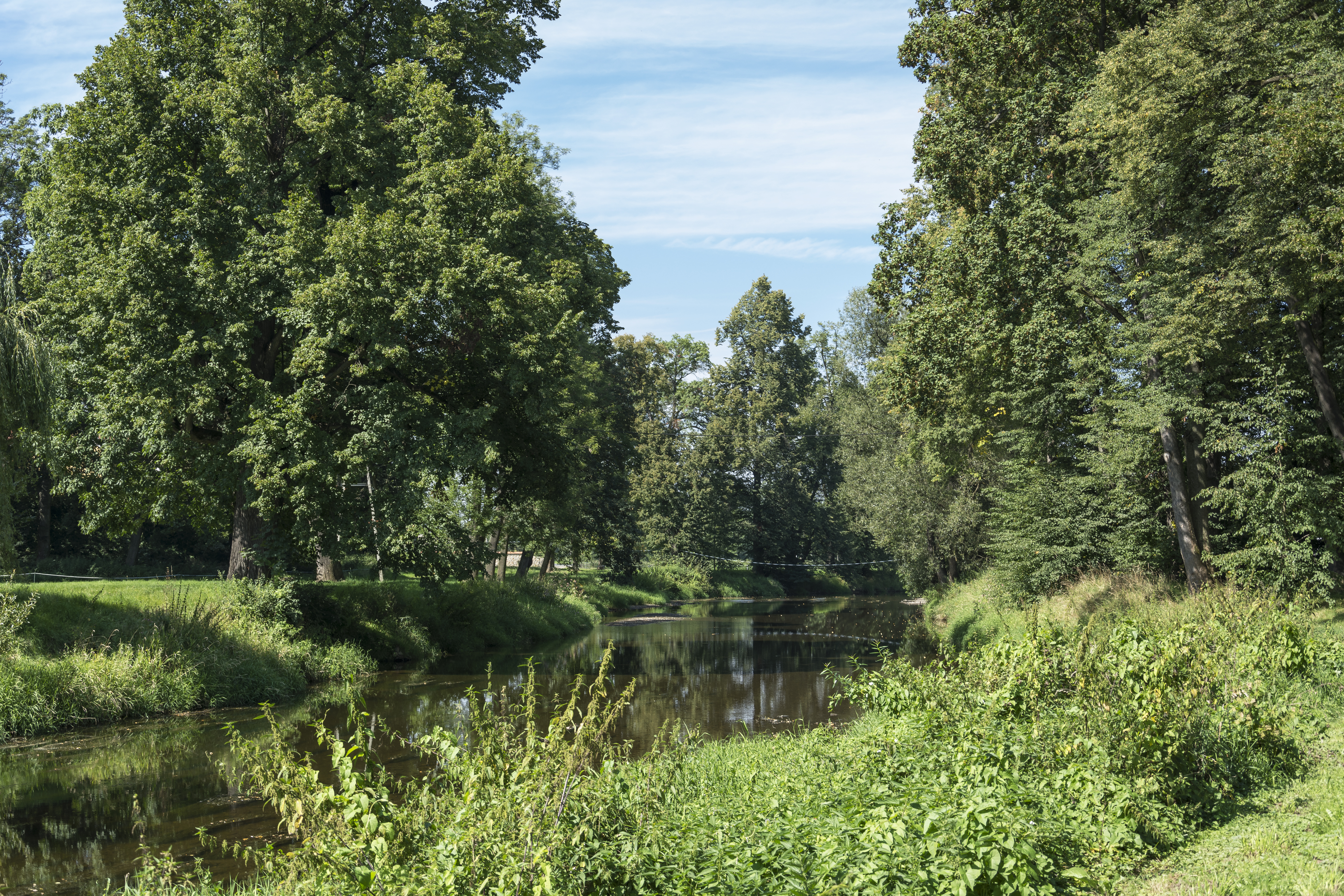
Palace park

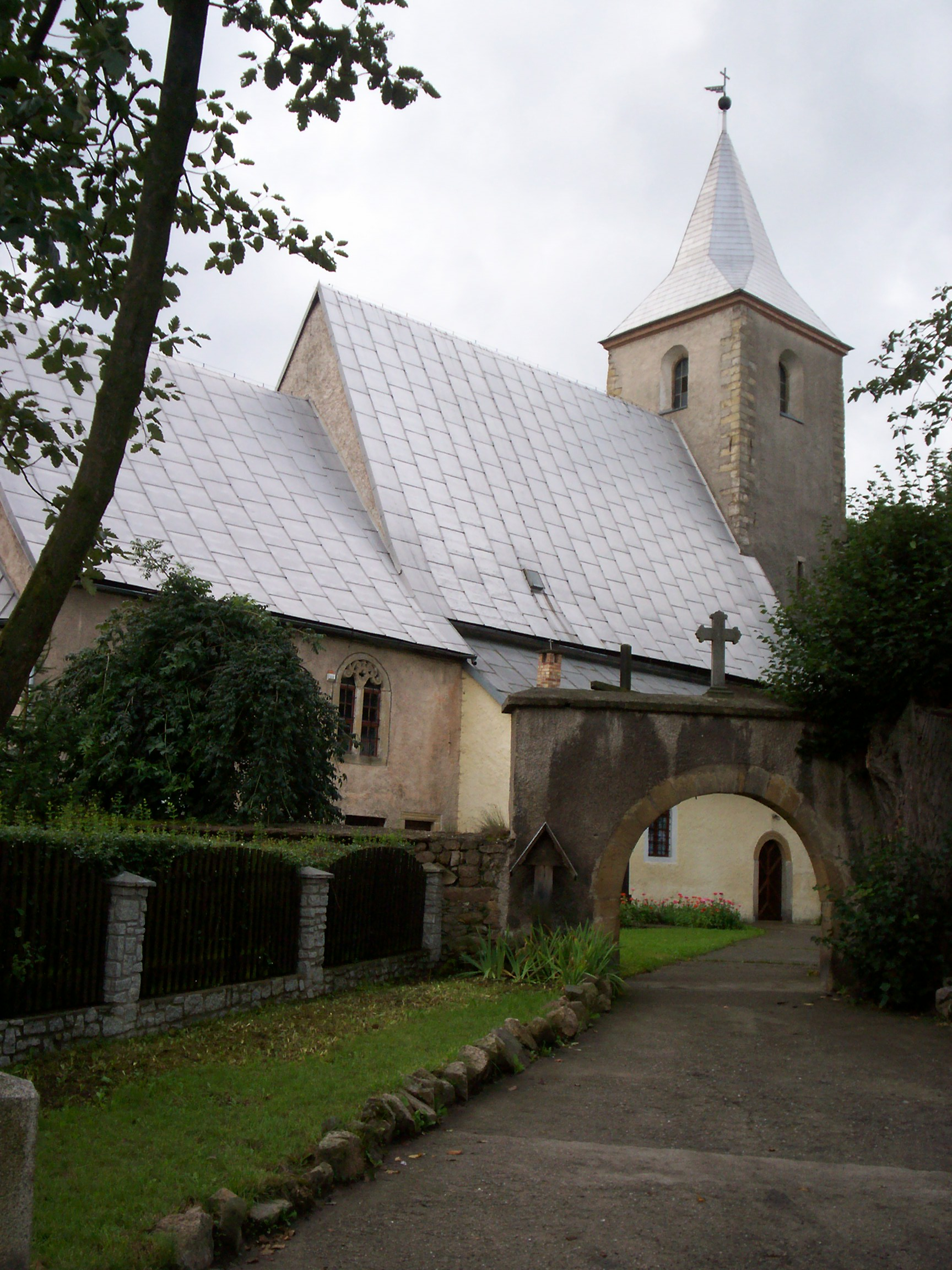
Church of the Assumption

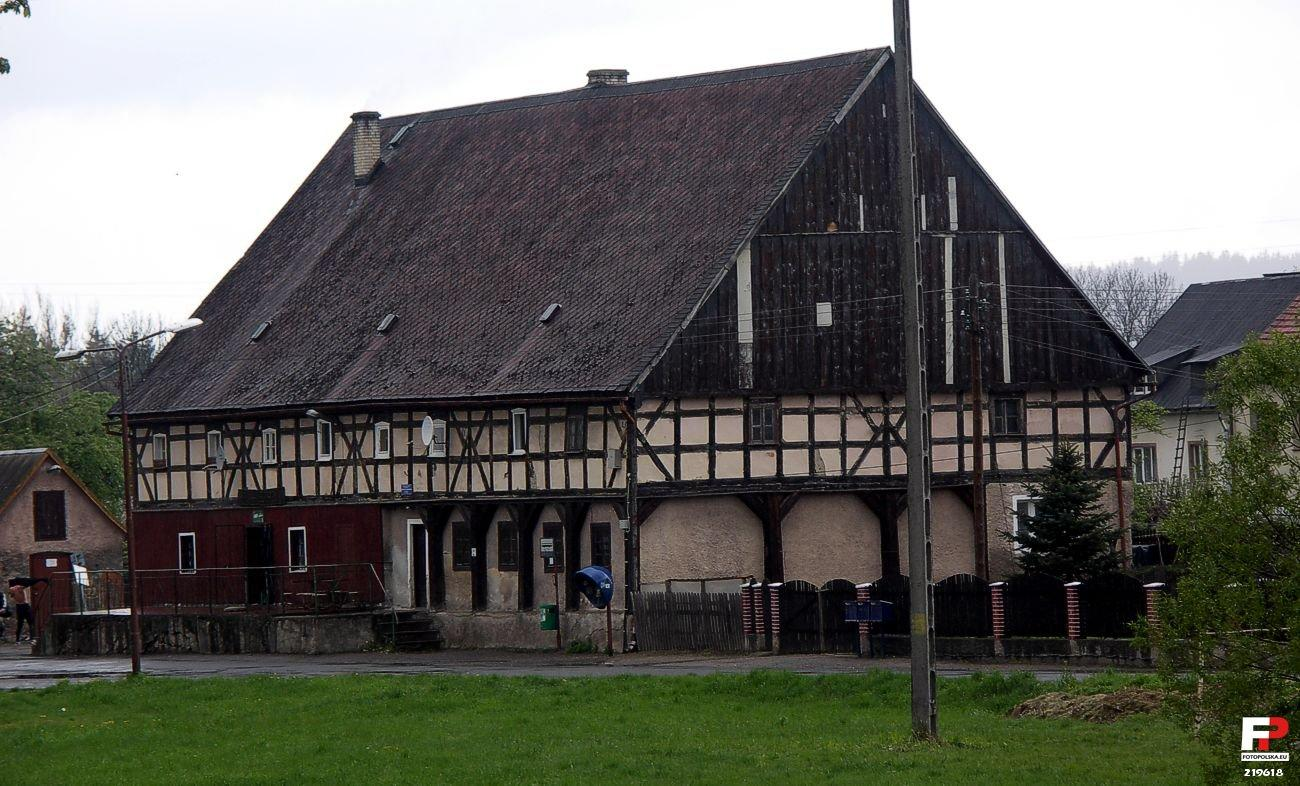
Old timber-framed house

== See also ==
- Castles in Poland
