= Horst Brünner =

Deputy Defense Minister of DDR

Generaloberst Horst Brünner
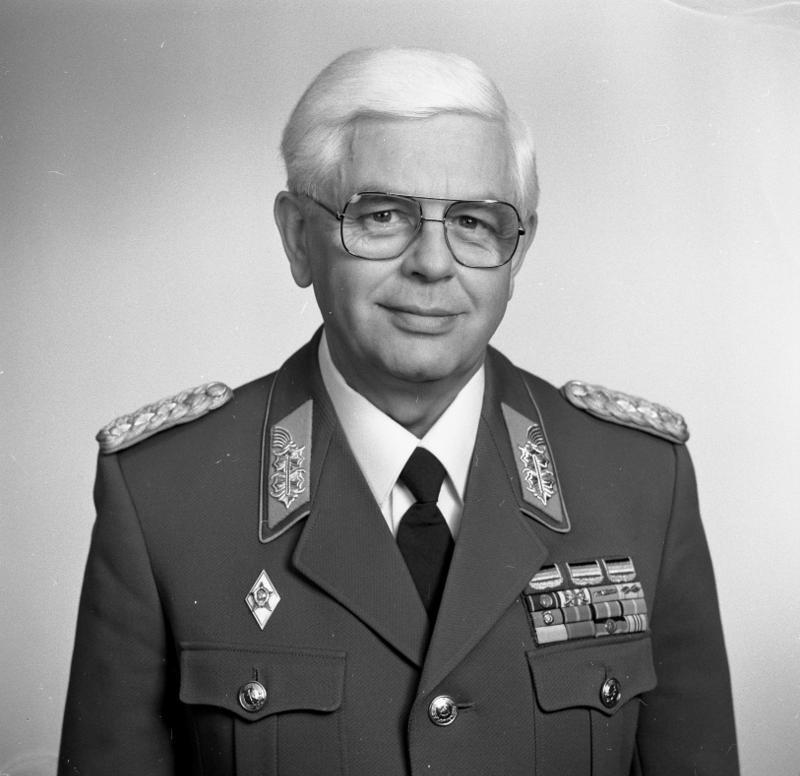
- Brünner in 1988

Chief of the Political Administration
- In office 10 December 1985 – 31 December 1989
- Minister: Heinz Keßler
- Preceded by: Heinz Keßler
- Succeeded by: Position abolished
Volkskammer
Member of the Volkskammer for Cottbus-Stadt, Cottbus-Land, Calau, Forst, Guben, Spremberg
In office 16 June 1986 – 29 January 1990
Preceded by	Heinz Keßler
Succeeded by	Constituency abolished

Personal details
- Born: 21 February 1929 Buchwald, Province of Lower Silesia, Free State of Prussia, Weimar Republic (now Bukowiec, Poland)
- Died: 19 June 2008 (aged 79) Blankensee, Mecklenburg-Vorpommern, Germany
- Party: Socialist Unity Party (1948–1989)
- Education: Friedrich Engels Military Academy; Military Academy of the General Staff of the Armed Forces of the USSR (Dipl. rer. mil.)
- Occupation: Party Functionary; Military Officer; Politician; Policeman
- Awards: Patriotic Order of Merit, 1st class; Scharnhorst Order; Order of Karl Marx
- Central institution membership: 1986–1989: Full member, Central Committee; 1976–1986: Full member, Central Committee; Other offices held: 1986–1989: Member, National Defence Council

Horst Brünner (1929–2008) was deputy Defense Minister in the East German Council of Ministers and chief of the Central Political Administration of the National People's Army.

== Life ==
The son of a bricklayer, Brünner trained between 1943 and 1946 for a career in industry and commerce. In 1945 the frontier between Poland and Germany moved west and Brünner was one of the millions of Germans obliged to relocate as part of this militarily and politically driven process, ending up in the Soviet occupation zone of Germany which was in the process of becoming the German Democratic Republic (East Germany). In 1947 he switched to railway construction work.

He joined the FDJ in 1946, and the new country's ruling SED (party) in 1948. He joined the Volkspolizei (police), and was based at Löbau. Between 1949 and 1951 he worked as a Political commissar at the Police academy in nearby Pirna. Brünner served in various positions with the police service before becoming, in 1956, Deputy Commander and Leader of the (quasi-military) Police section of the Sixth Motorised Protection Division at Prenzlau. Then for three years, from 1959 till 1962, he studied for and received a Military Diploma at the prestigious Friedrich Engels Military Academy at Dresden. Following this, from 1962 till 1965, Brünner was departmental head in the Political Central Administration of the East German Ministry for National Defence.

In 1964 he was promoted to the rank of colonel. Between 1965 and 1968 he served in the National Border Troops. After this he spent two years in Moscow at the Soviet Military Academy, returning with a degree in military sciences. He was promoted in March 1971 to the rank of major general and became deputy head of Military District III (Leipzig) and head of political administration. In 1972 he transferred back to the national Ministry for Defence, where he served in the Main Political Bureau.

Brünner was able to celebrate the twentieth anniversary of the National People's Army with another promotion in March 1976, this time to the rank of lieutenant general. In the same year he was nominated as a candidate for The Party Central Committee: appointment to the committee followed in 1986. In 1985 he succeeded Heinz Kessler as Deputy Minister for National Defense and Chief of the Central Political Administration. He remained in this post till 1989, receiving a further military promotion, to Generaloberst, in 1987. Horst Brünner was one of only eleven officers to be promoted to this level during the lifetime of the German Democratic Republic.

From 1986 till 1989 Brünner was a member of the country's powerful National Defense Council, and for approximately the same period, from 1986 till 17 March 1989, he sat as a member of the People's Chamber. Following the events during the closing weeks of 1989, however, on 31 December 1989 Horst Brünner was released from active service, along with his fellow Colonel Generals Horst Stechbarth and Wolfgang Reinhold.

On 9 November 1989, as the Berlin Wall came down, and the government spokesman Günter Schabowski announced at a press conference (mistakenly, as it later transpired) that the government leadership intended the wall to be opened with immediate effect ("sofort, unverzüglich"), Horst Brünner was reported to be one of several horrified government hardliners calling for the immediate closure of all the East German borders in order to save The Republic. In the end the call of the hardliners went unheeded.

Horst Brünner later appeared in one of the series of trials of former East German senior officials accused of involvement in the murder of people killed while trying to cross the Berlin Wall from East to West Berlin. In the early summer of 1998 the Berlin Regional Court sentenced Brünner, along with his co-accused Manfred Grätz, Wolfgang Herger and Heinz Tappert, to a two-year suspended jail term.

== Awards ==
- 1978 Patriotic Order of Merit in Silver
- 1980 Ernst Schneller Medal in Gold
- 1981 Honoured member of the National People's Army
- 1984 Scharnhorst Order
- 1986 Patriotic Order of Merit in Gold
- 1989 Order of Karl Marx
