= Kostrzyca, Lower Silesian Voivodeship =

Kostrzyca
- Village
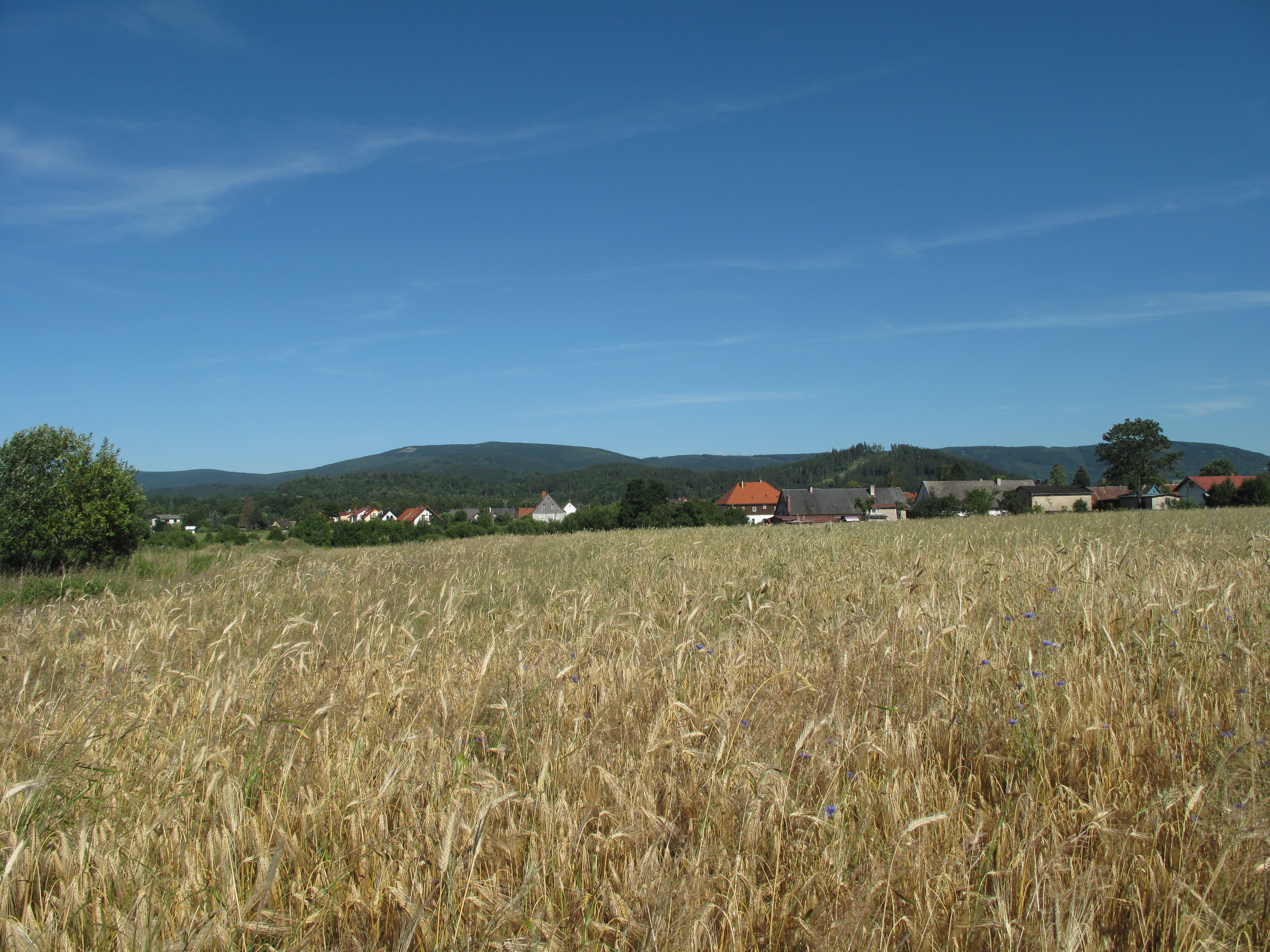
- Kostrzyca as seen from the distance

- Location within Poland
- Coordinates: 50°49′10″N 15°48′26″E
- Country: Poland
- Voivodeship: Lower Silesian
- Powiat: Karkonosze
- Gmina: Mysłakowice

Kostrzyca [kɔsˈtʂɨt͡sa] is a village in the administrative district of Gmina Mysłakowice, within Karkonosze County, Lower Silesian Voivodeship, in south-western Poland.

== Gallery ==
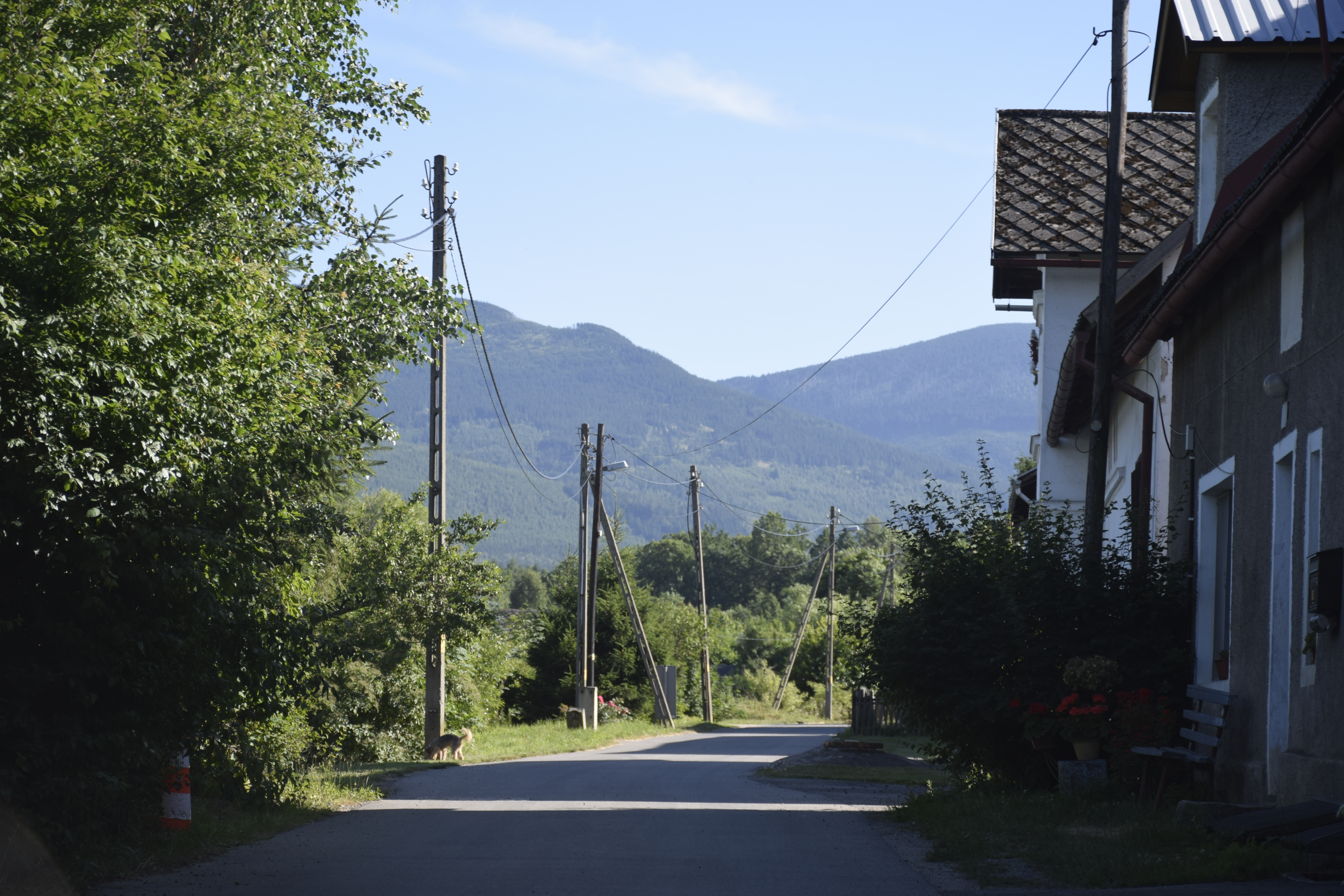
Street with electric poles

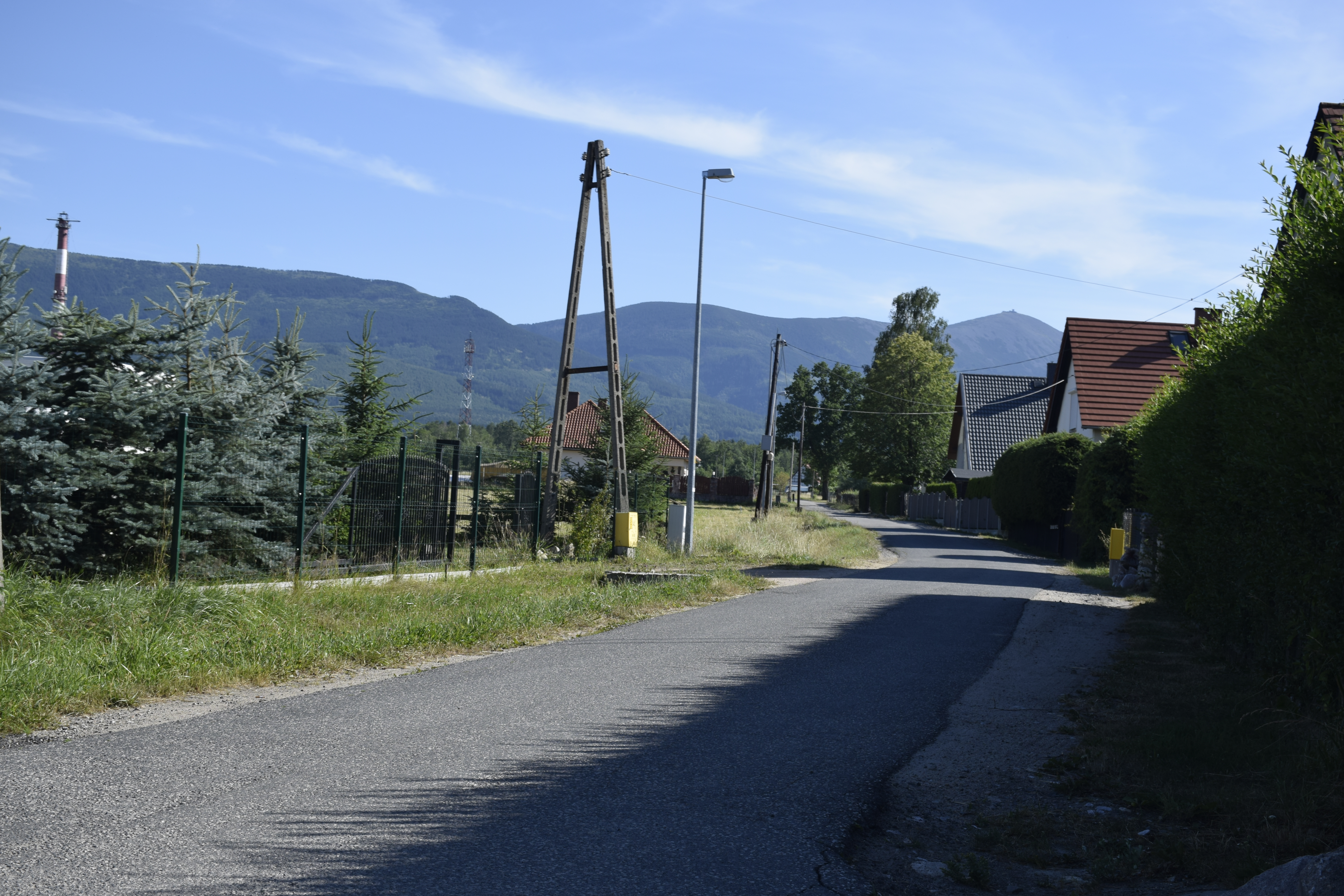
Street

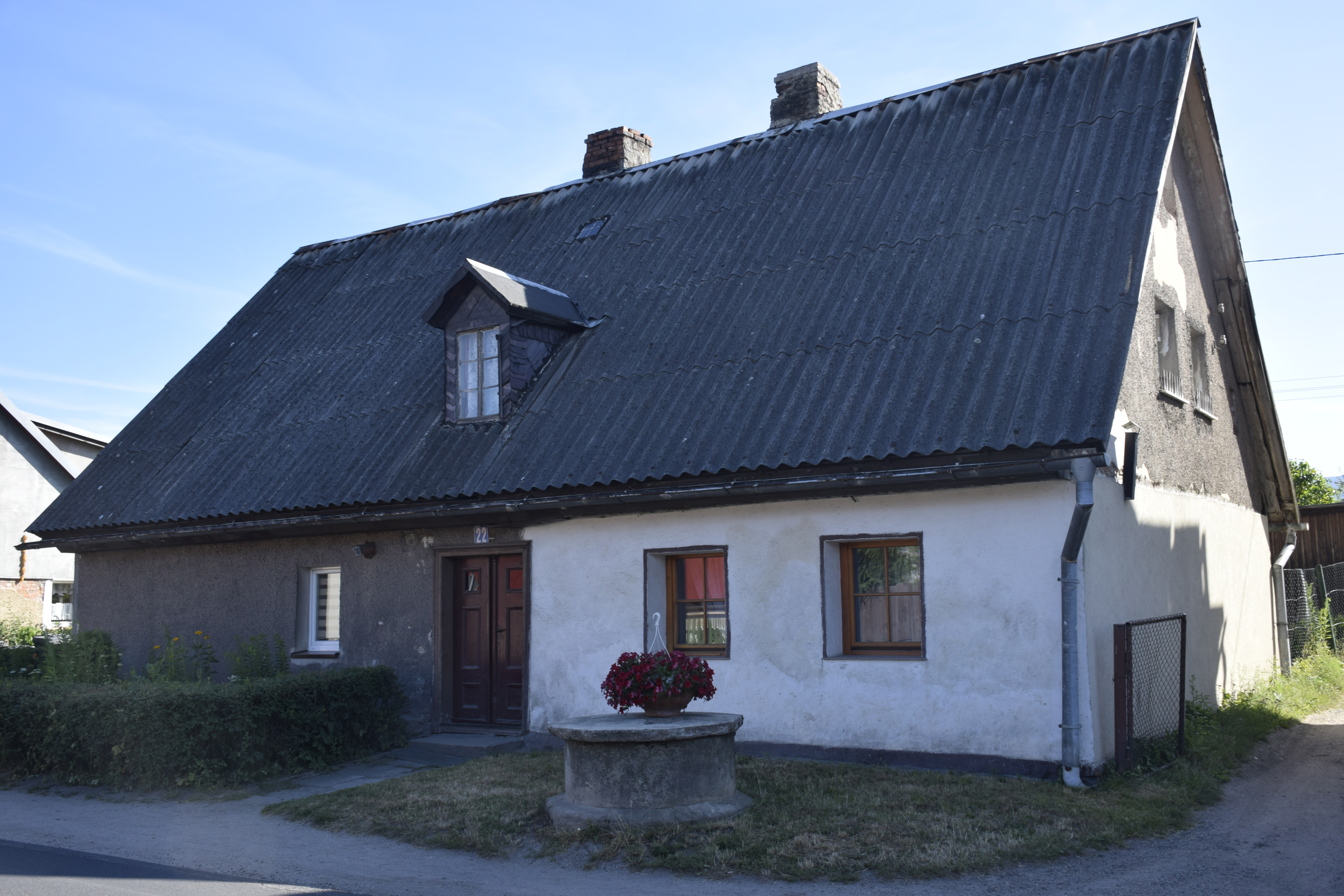
House
