= Krogulec, Lower Silesian Voivodeship =

Krogulec
- Village
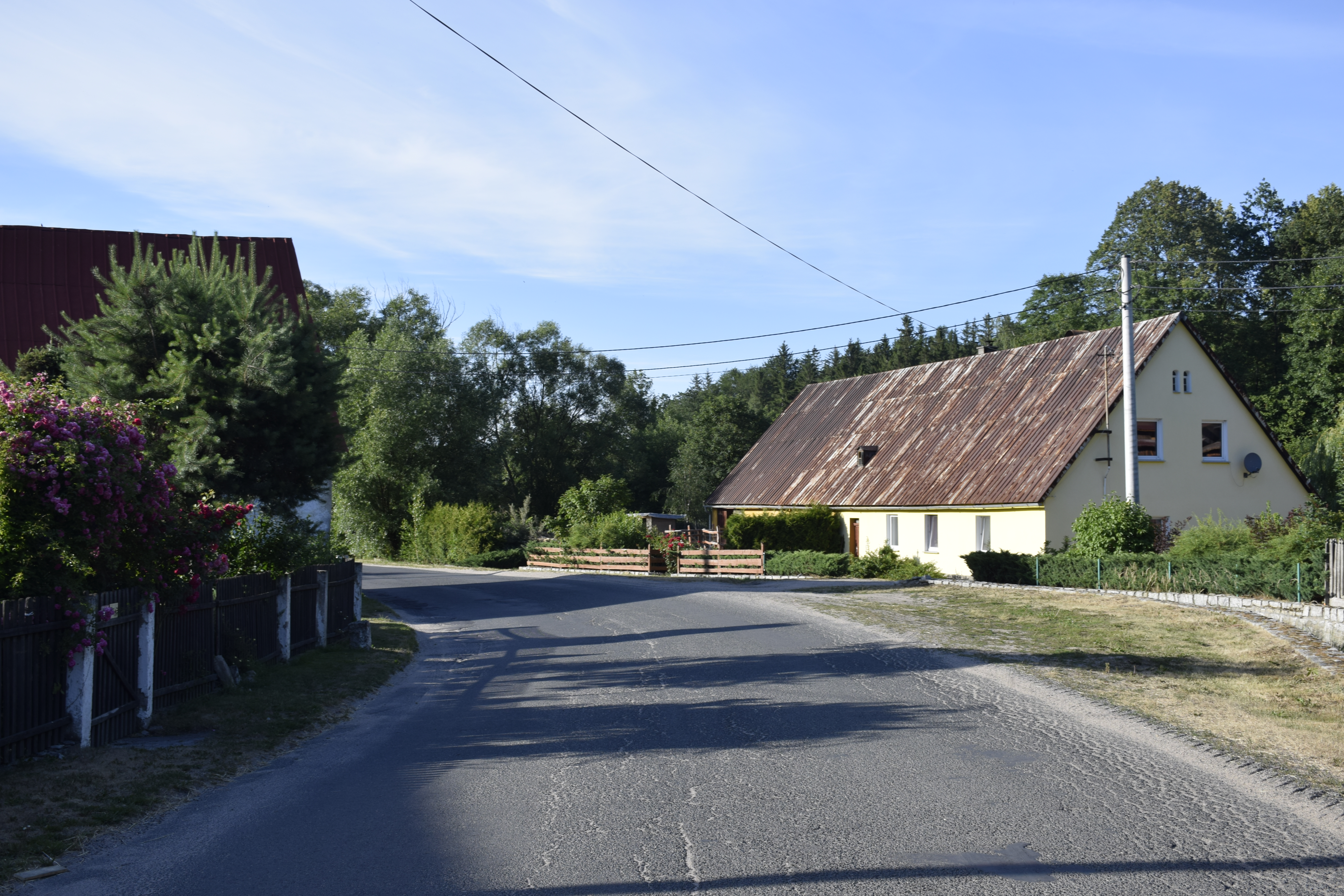
- House by the road

- Location within Poland
- Coordinates: 50°50′22″N 15°50′24″E
- Country: Poland
- Voivodeship: Lower Silesian
- Powiat: Karkonosze
- Gmina: Mysłakowice

Krogulec [krɔˈɡulɛt͡s] is a village in the administrative district of Gmina Mysłakowice, within Karkonosze County, Lower Silesian Voivodeship, in south-western Poland.

== Gallery ==
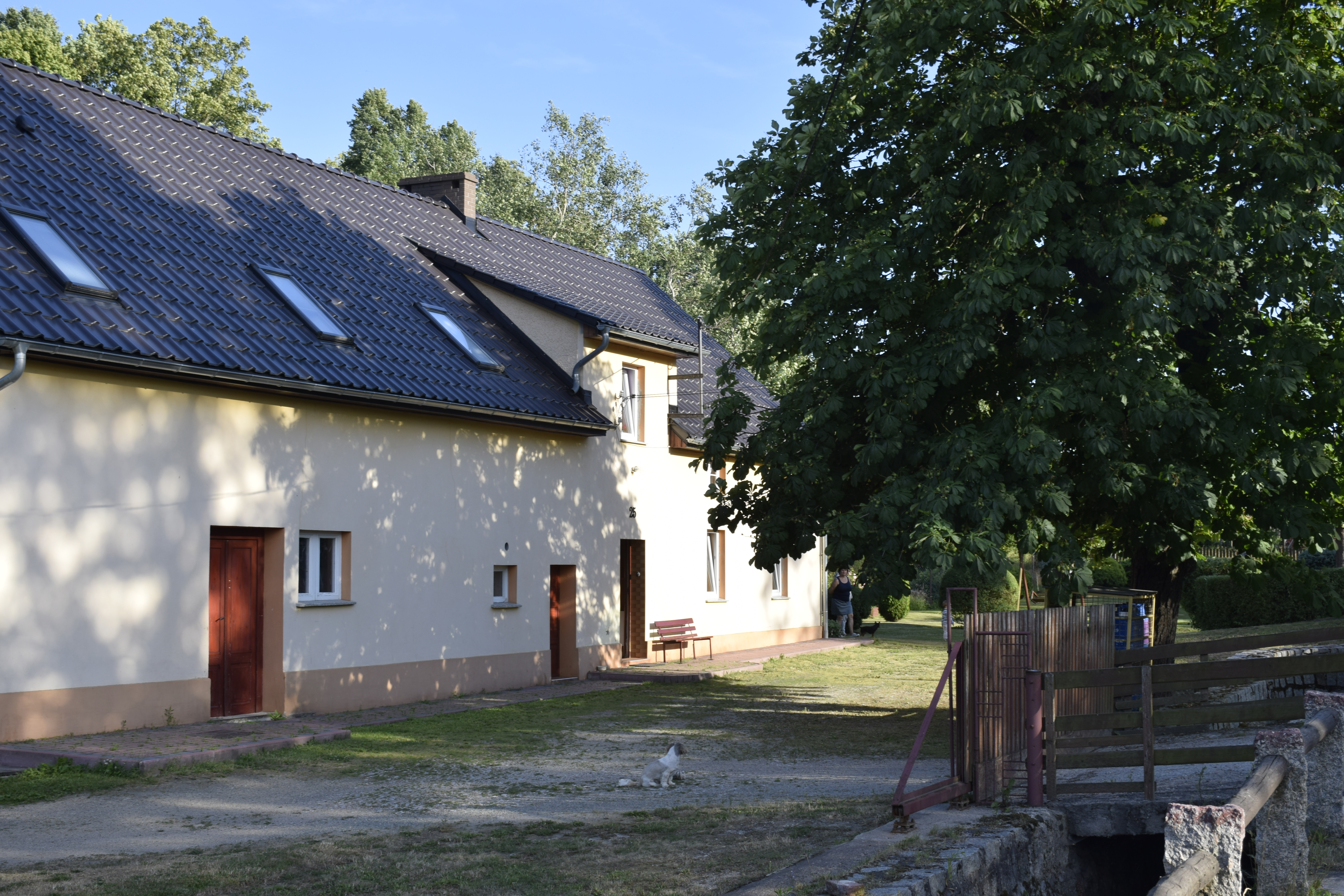
House

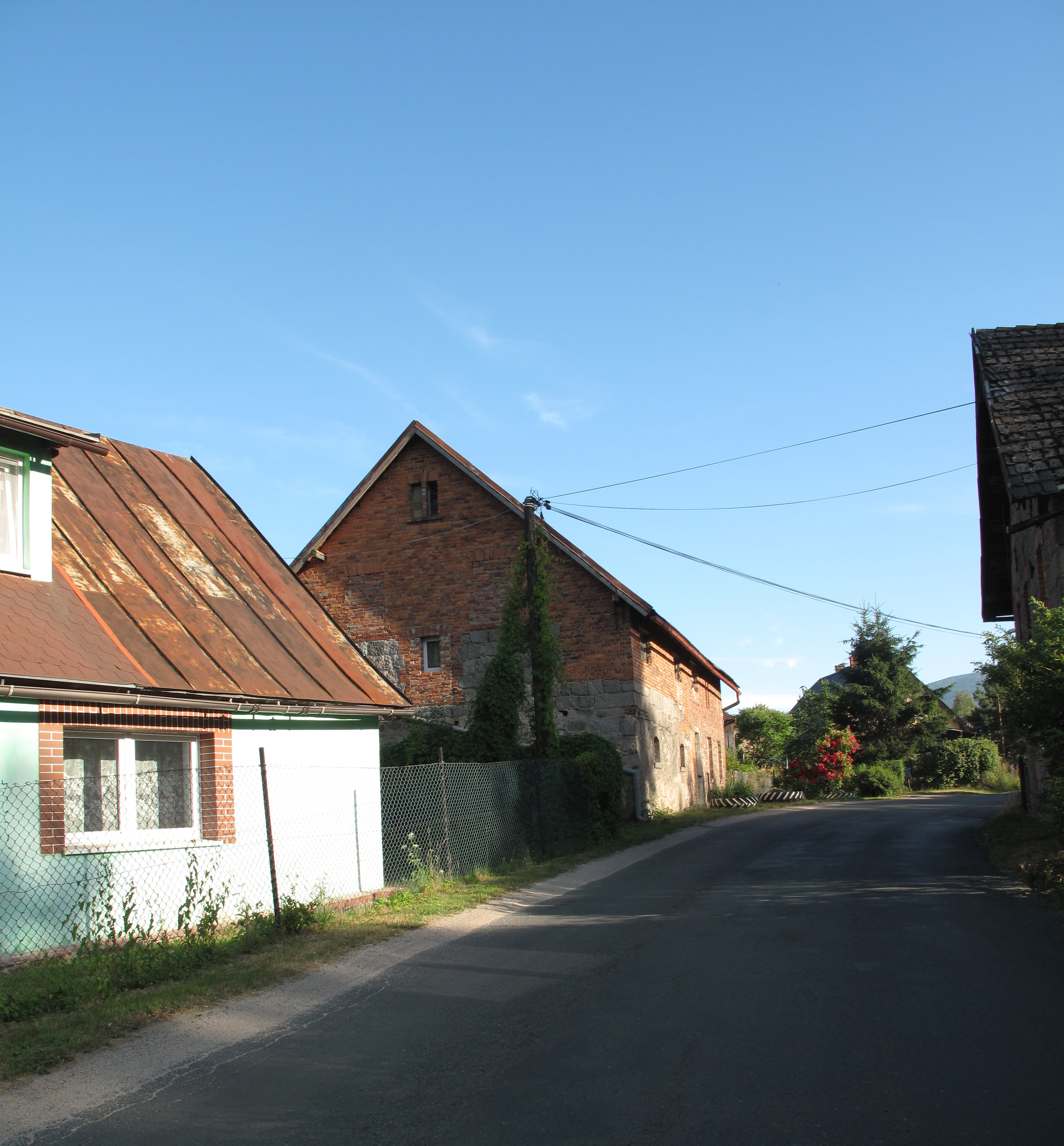
Street

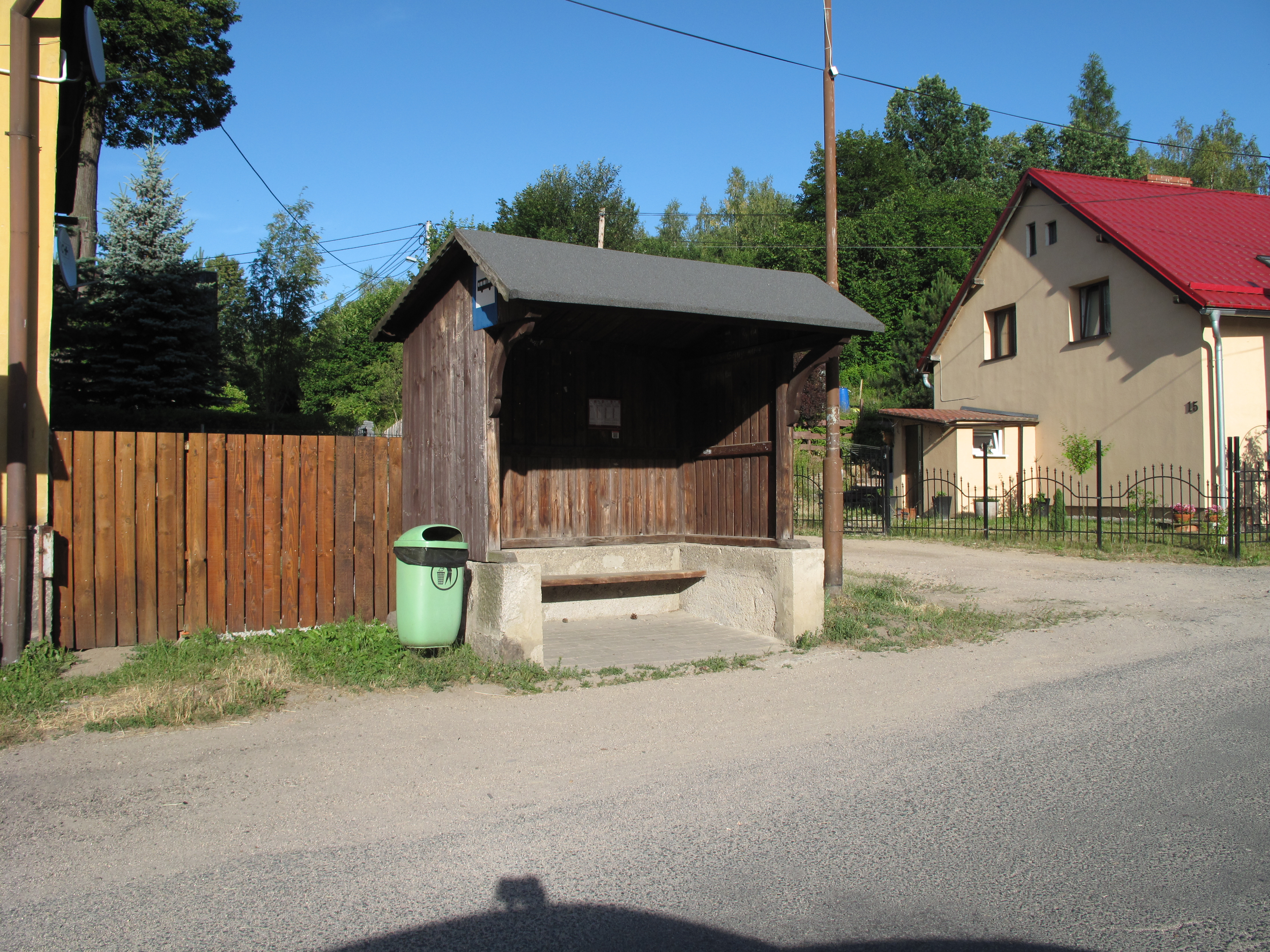
Bus stop
