= Strużnica =

- Village
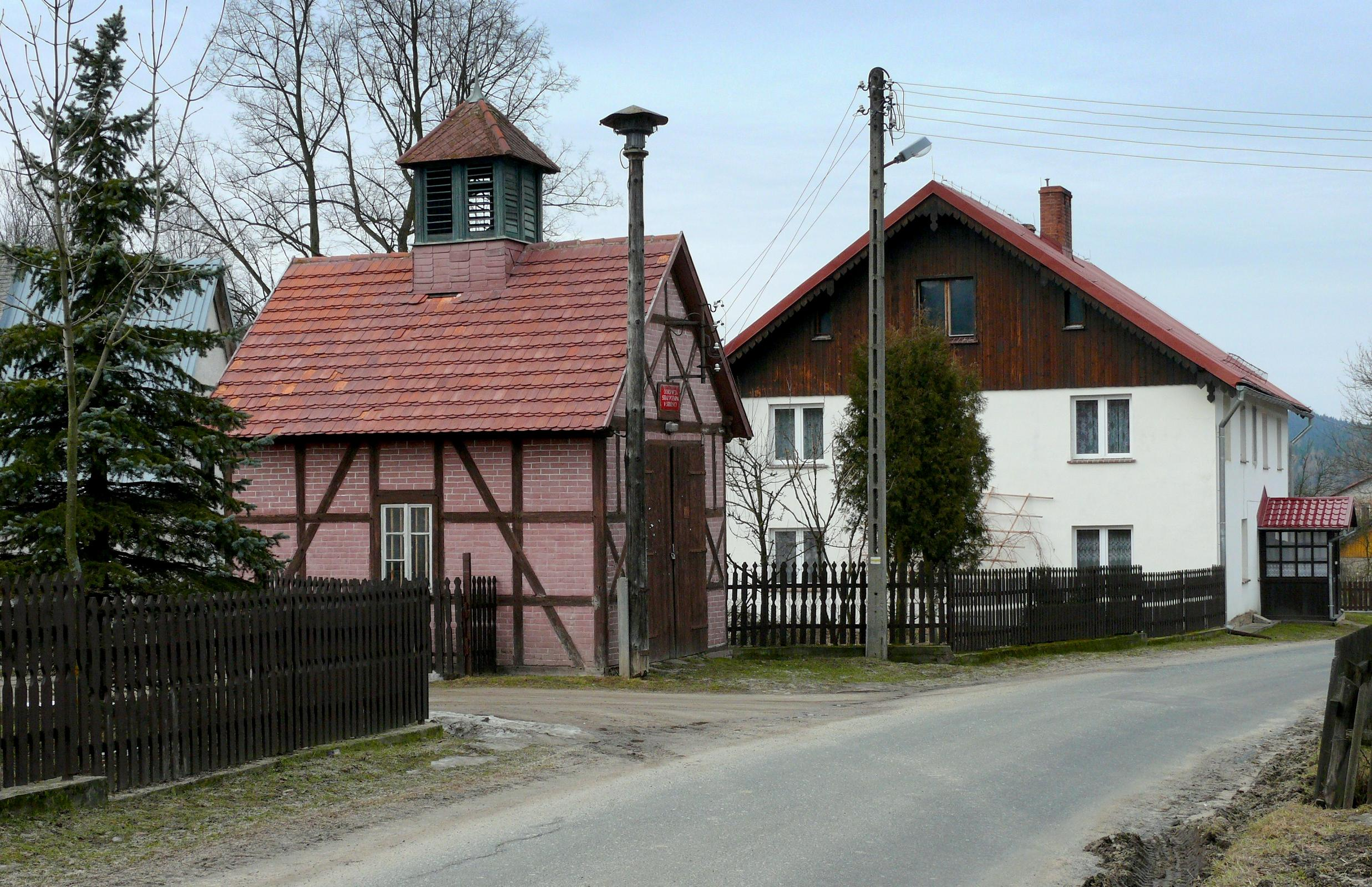

- Location within Poland
- Coordinates: 50°50′N 15°52′E
- Country: Poland
- Voivodeship: Lower Silesian
- Powiat: Karkonosze
- Gmina: Mysłakowice
- Time zone: UTC+1 (CET)
  - Summer (DST): UTC+2 (CEST)
- Postal code: 58-533
- Vehicle registration: DJE

Strużnica [struʐˈnit͡sa] is a village in the administrative district of Gmina Mysłakowice, within Karkonosze County, Lower Silesian Voivodeship, in south-western Poland.

During World War II, Nazi Germany operated a forced labour camp for Jews in the village.
