= Mysłakowice =

- Village
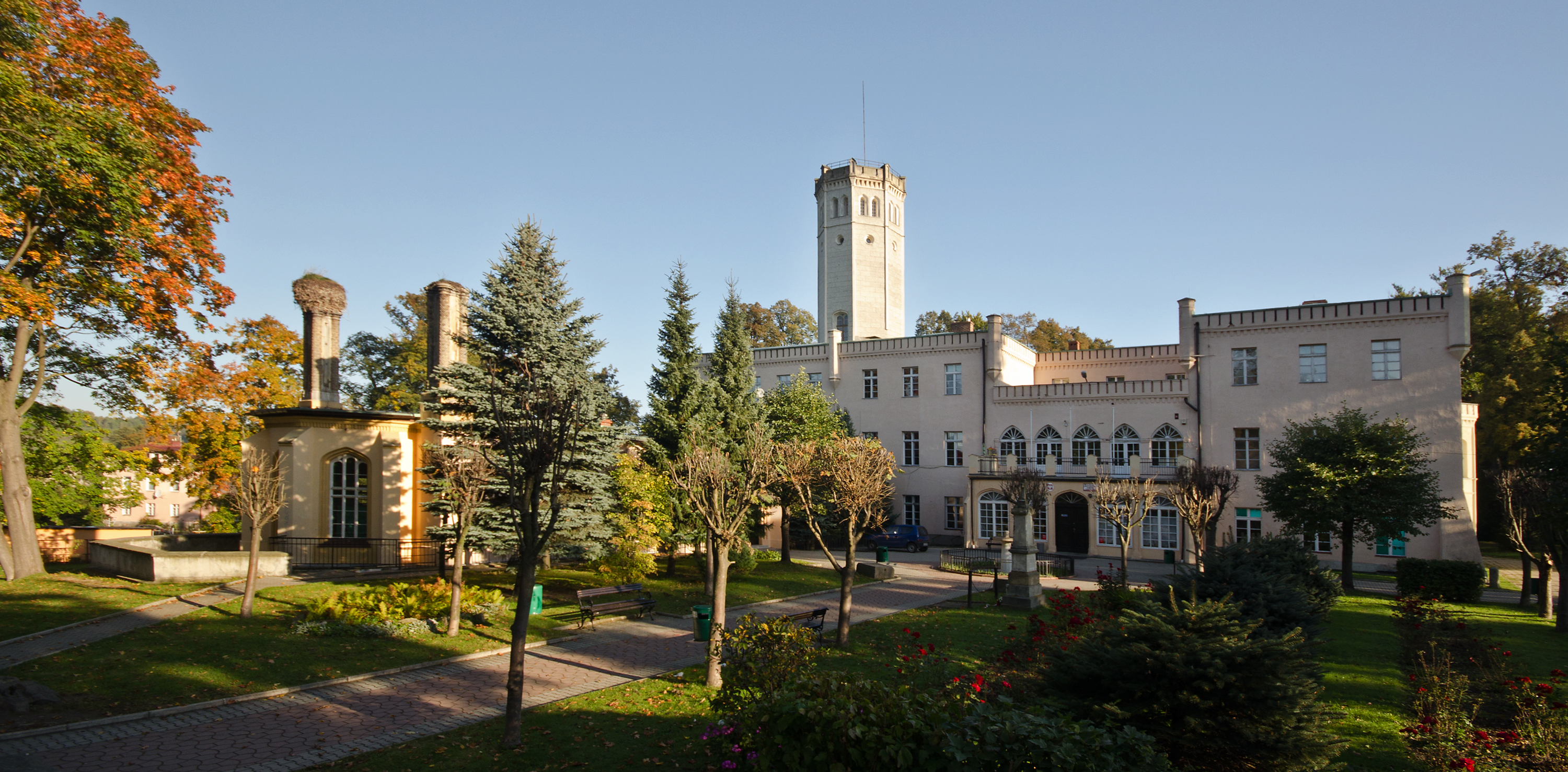
- Chateau in Mysłakowice

- Coat of arms

- Location within Poland
- Coordinates: 50°51′N 15°47′E
- Country: Poland
- Voivodeship: Lower Silesian
- Powiat: Karkonosze
- Gmina: Mysłakowice

Population
  - Total: 5,100
- Time zone: UTC+1 (CET)
  - Summer (DST): UTC+2 (CEST)
- Vehicle registration: DJE
- Website: http://www.myslakowice.pl/

Mysłakowice [mɨswakɔˈvit͡sɛ] is a village in Karkonosze County, Lower Silesian Voivodeship, in south-western Poland. It is the seat of the administrative district (gmina) called Gmina Mysłakowice.

It is situated at the foothills of the Rudawy Janowickie in the Western Sudetes.

== History ==
The area became part of the emerging Polish state in the 10th century. The village dates back to the Middle Ages. The oldest mention comes from the Liber fundationis episcopatus Vratislaviensis from around 1305, when it was part of the Duchy of Jawor of fragmented Piast-ruled Poland.

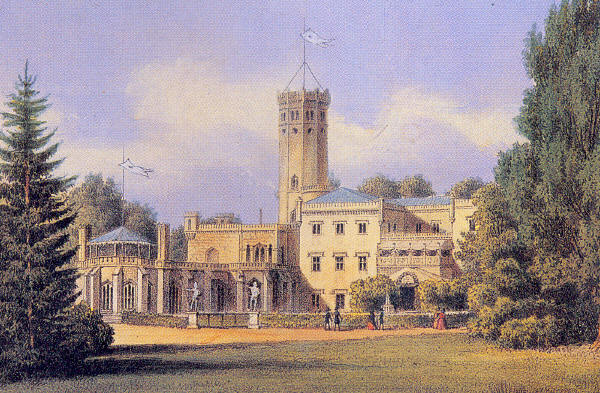
The palace in the 19th century

The village along with the region was annexed by the Kingdom of Prussia in the 18th century. The Prussian field marshal August von Gneisenau owned an estate here, where he lived during his retirement. King Frederick William III of Prussia visited him several times when staying with his brother Prince Wilhelm at Fischbach (today Karpniki), also located in the Jelenia Góra Valley, where the prince had acquired a castle in 1822. After Gneisenau's death the king purchased Erdmannsdorf estate in 1831 and had the manor house redecorated and a new church built by Karl Friedrich Schinkel. The church portico is supported by two marble columns from Pompeii, a gift from Joseph Bonaparte, King of Naples, to Frederick William III. In 1838 the king distributed large parts of his farmland to Protestant refugees from the Austrian Zillertal who built Tyrolian style farmhouses that can still be seen. The valley became a royal hideaway, and in 1838 the king purchased nearby Schildau Castle (today Wojanów) for his daughter Princess Louise. His son Frederick William IV bought Erdmannsdorf from his stepmother Auguste, Princess of Liegnitz, and had it enlarged and redecorated in Tudor Revival architecture by Friedrich August Stüler from 1840. Next to the palace a Swiss style farmhouse was built for the Princess of Liegnitz. The park had been designed by Peter Joseph Lenné, offering wide views onto the Giant Mountains; both castle and park do still exist, however used by a school and in rather neglected condition. The famous views are concealed behind trees.

In 1882, a rail connection from Jelenia Góra via Mysłakowice to Kowary was opened, in 1895 a rail connection to Karpacz was opened.

During World War II, the Germans operated seven forced labour camps in the village. The first three camps were established in 1941 for Jewish women, French POWs and Soviet POWs, respectively. Further three camps were founded in 1942, and its prisoners were Polish women, Soviet women and Italian POWs. In 1944, another camp for Polish women, brought from Warsaw, was founded, and the camp for Jewish women was converted into a subcamp of the Gross-Rosen concentration camp. On 17 February 1945, the prisoners of the subcamp were evacuated to Gross-Rosen and Smržovka.

After the defeat of Nazi Germany in the war, in 1945, the village became again part of Poland. Formerly an elementary school was located in the historic palace. Nowadays the elementary school is located on Ul. Królewska since January 2023.

== Economy ==
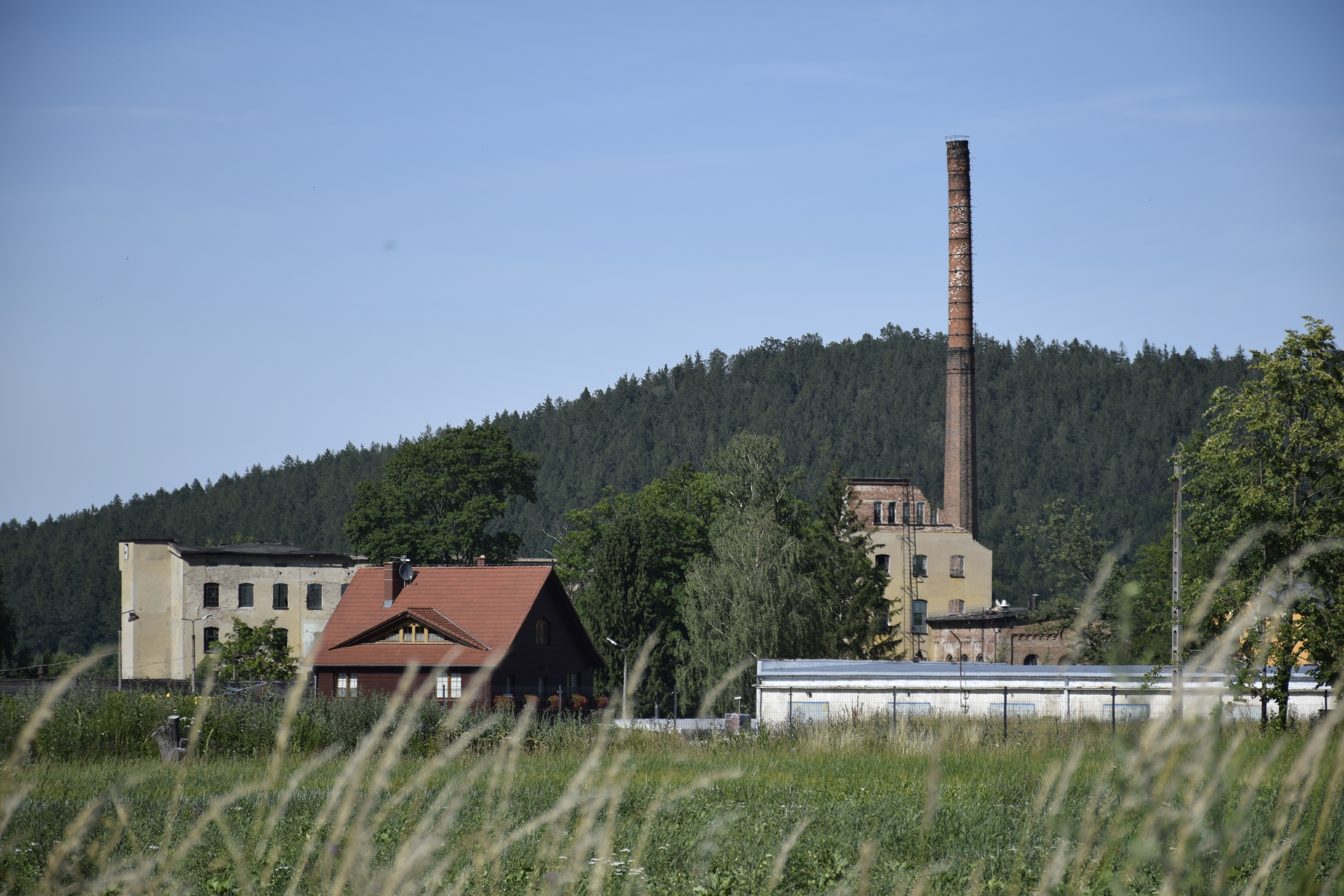
Linen factory

Linen has been manufactured in Mysłakowice since 1844. The factory was powered by a 34 ft (10.4) watermill, producing some 30 hp. Twenty years later it was operating over 13,000 spindles. At the Paris World Industrial Exhibition of 1867, the company was awarded a gold medal for their product display. Ten years later the factory was expanded to cope with its 260 mechanical looms. Transport links were improved when the railway line was opened to Jelenia Gora, having its own platform away from the main village station.

Disaster struck during June 1894, when a flood inundated the factory forcing a fourteen-day closure. During WWI it produced sail cloth, towelling, and aircraft cloth. The interwar period was difficult, many local linen factories closing, but they clung on.

During World War II, under Nazi Germany, it became used as a forced labour factory initially with 200 prisoners. Between 1943-44, a further 300 were forced into labour and military production was initiated – both electrical products and anti-aircraft guns. The prisoners were Polish, Jewish and Soviet women, and Italian, French and Soviet POWs. It was liberated on 22 May 1945, by the Red Army, the prisoners released and the locals taking over the factory, which was named Orzeł (Polish for "Eagle").

By 1966, 80% of its produce was exported and the factory employed almost 2,700 people. It was run by the unions during the 70's and 80's eventually being privatised and eventually listed on the Warsaw Stock Exchange on 15 February 2007. Unfortunately, it went bankrupt on 1 July 2010.

In June 2012, the company was purchased by new owners and the production of linen fabrics is reactivated as Orzeł Sp. z and continues, but not on such a grand scale as its heyday.

== Gallery ==
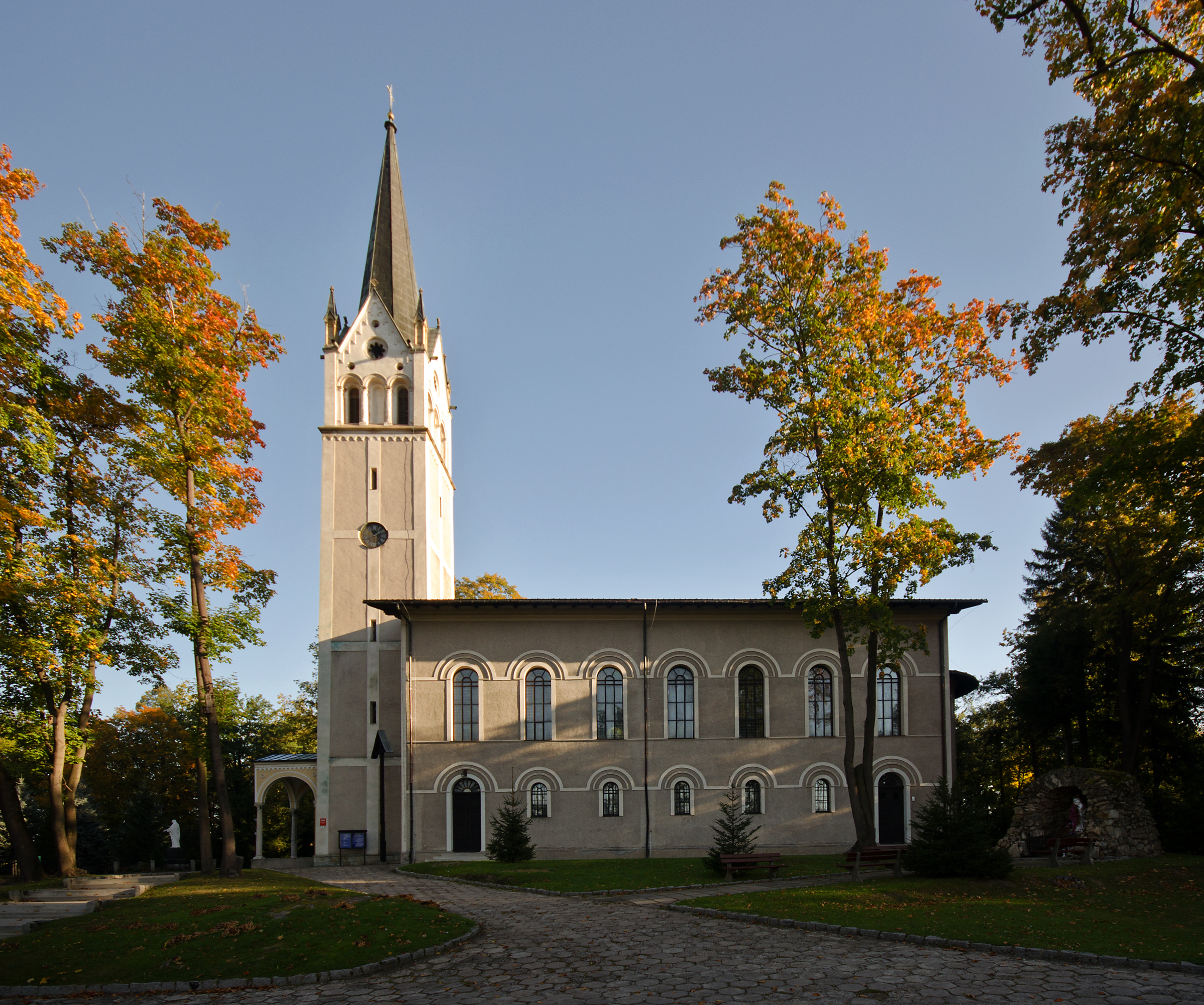
Sacred Heart church

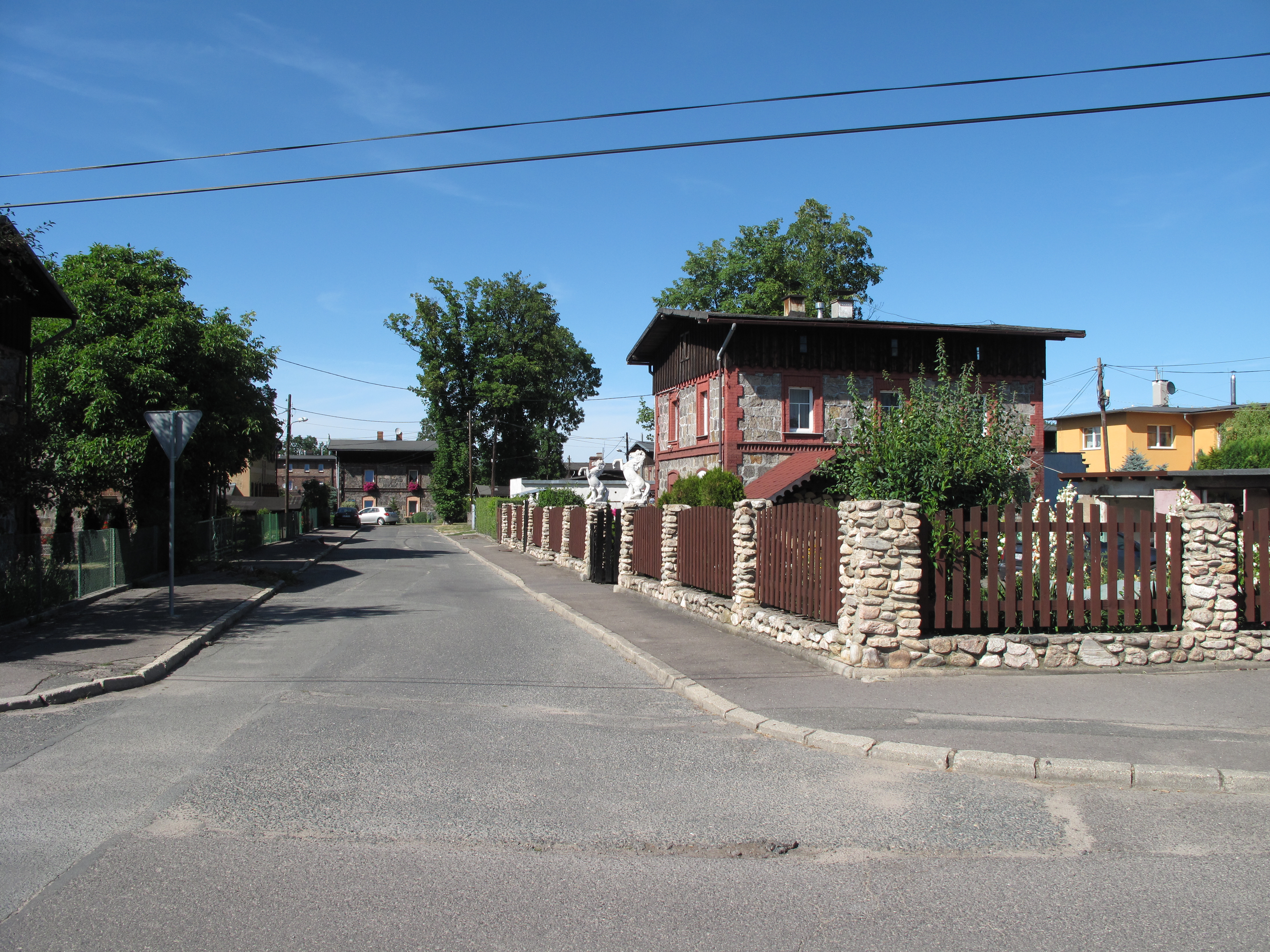
Street with old buildings

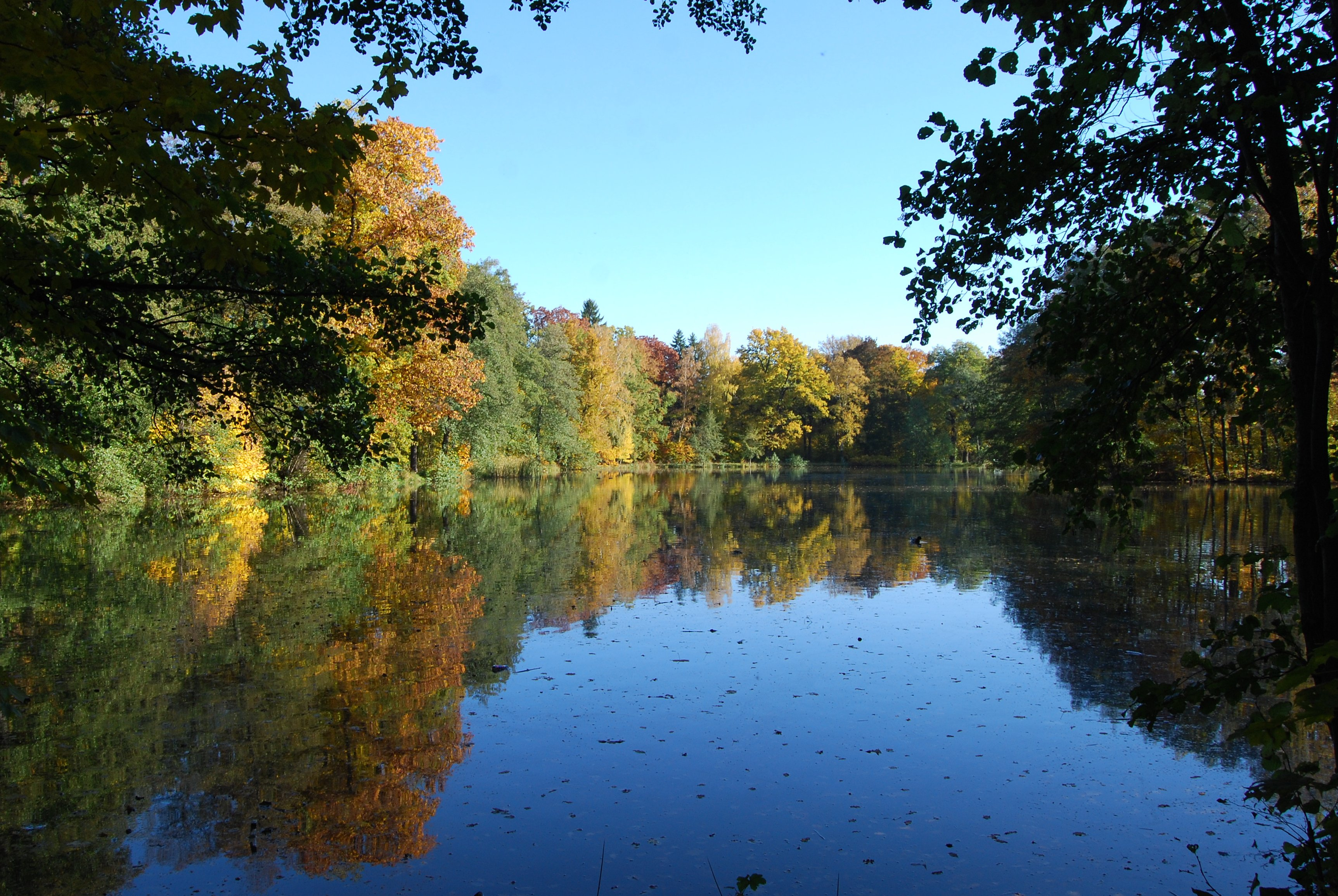
Park
