= Spanish airlift of 1936 =

Military operation at the beginning of the Spanish Civil War

- Part of the Spanish Civil War
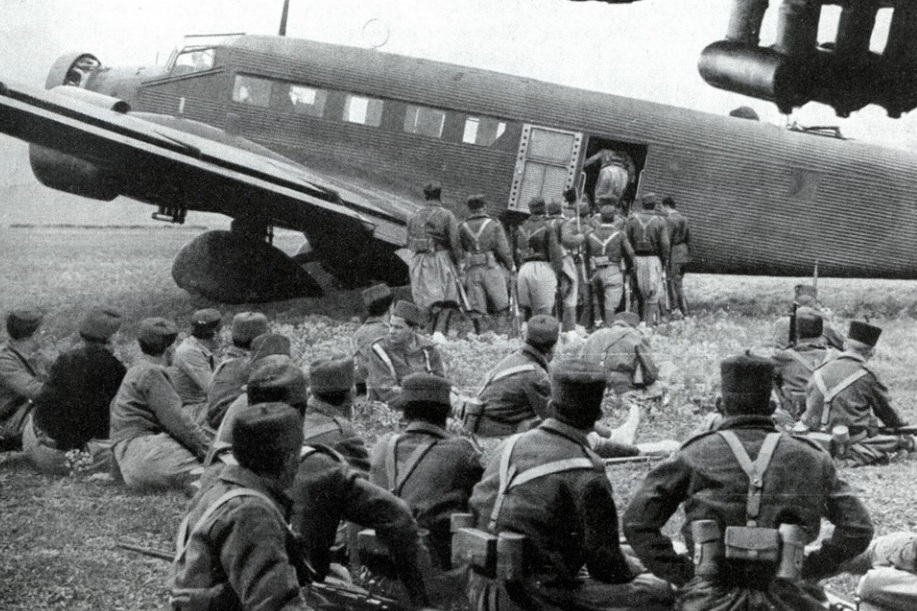
- Regulares of the Army of Africa boarding a Junkers Ju 52. Vestiges of the aircraft’s Luftwaffe markings can be seen on its rear fuselage
Date	19 July – 11 October 1936
Location	Spain
Result	Provided sufficient forces to rescue the Nationalist coup from failure and expand the Spanish Civil War

Belligerents
Spanish government	Nationalist rebels

The Spanish airlift of 1936 was a military operation carried out by the Nationalists during the early phase of the Spanish Civil War. It did not have any specific code name. Its objective was to bypass the Republican naval blockade of the Strait of Gibraltar and transport by air the Nationalist soldiers stationed in Spanish Morocco to the rebel-controlled part of Andalusia. The undertaking was hugely successful; during 85 days from 19 July to 11 October the Nationalists transported at least 14,000 men (with some sources claiming 23,000) and at least 270 tonnes of war materiel (according to some sources 400 tonnes).

The success was possible thanks to more than thirty aircraft provided by Nazi Germany and Fascist Italy sent on the personal orders of Adolf Hitler and Benito Mussolini respectively; these carried most of the troops and equipment. The operation is viewed as innovative, as it was the first ever large-scale military transport by air. Since there was no major Republican counter-action, the airlift was a challenge in terms of logistics and technology rather than combat. The opinion prevailing in historiography is that the airlift was vital for the Nationalists and helped to turn the failed coup into a long-lasting civil war.

== Background ==
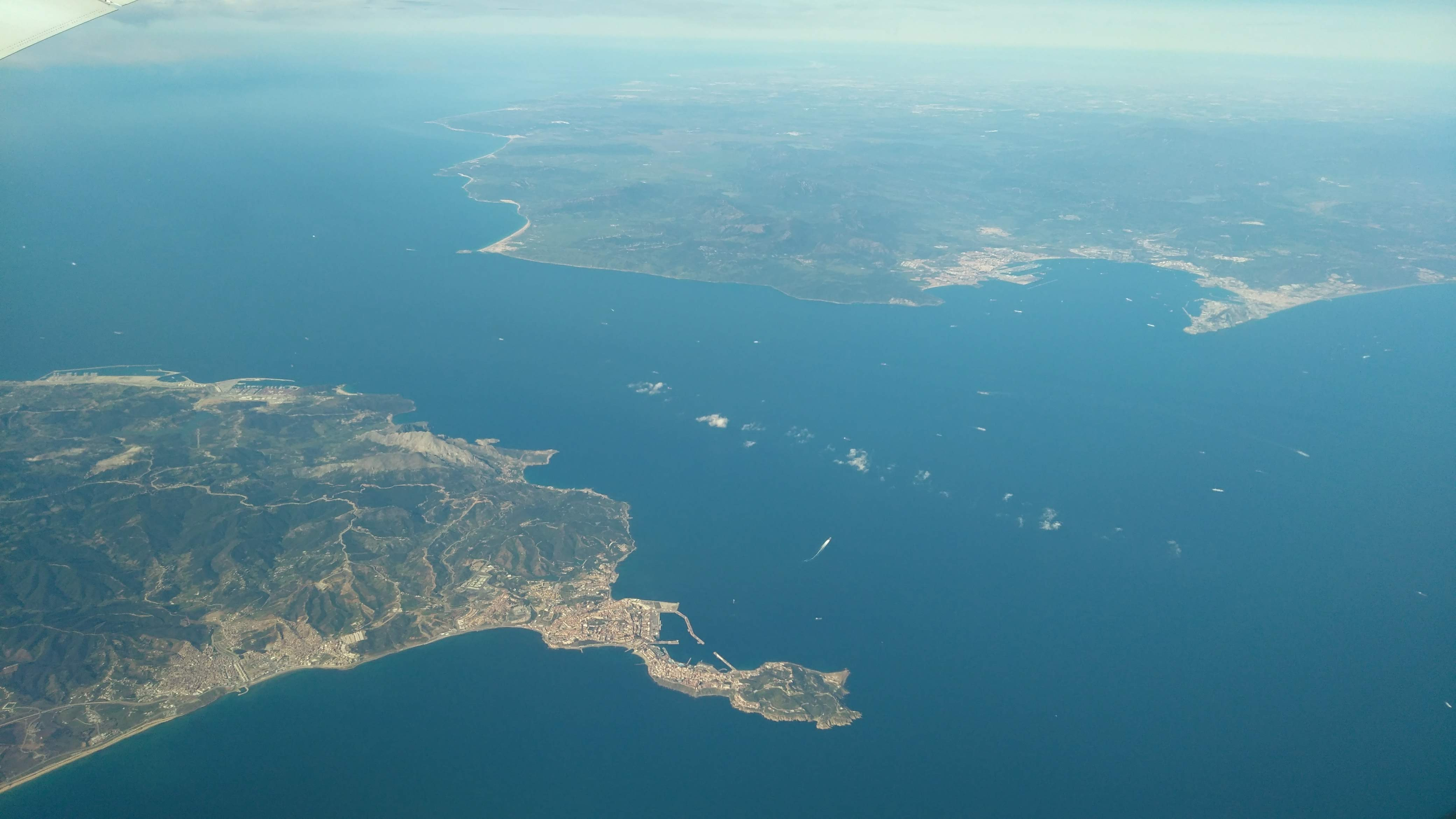
Strait of Gibraltar looking northwest from above the coast of Morocco to southern Spain and Gibraltar. In the left and centre foreground, Ceuta is visible on the Peninsula of Almina at the northeastern tip of the Tingitan Peninsula; in the upper right background is the Bay of Gibraltar. On the western shore of the bay Algeciras is visible, with Gibraltar on the eastern shore.

The coup of July 1936 commenced in Spanish Morocco; on 17 July the rebels easily gained control of most of the protectorate, overwhelming remaining pockets of resistance the following day. However, on the peninsula the coup was far less successful; on 18 July the insurgents gained rather shaky control over Seville and Córdoba, while the situation remained unclear in Cádiz, Granada, Huelva and Málaga. During the evening of that day, a few hundred Morocco-stationed rebel troops boarded the destroyer Churruca, which in the early hours of 19 July transported them to Cádiz, greatly contributing to the full rebel takeover of the city. However, on her way back, the Churruca's officers were overpowered by the crew. Other warships loyal to the government were deployed in the Strait of Gibraltar, blocking any would-be further transport of the rebels by sea. (Note: ”[O]nly about 700 were transferred during the first twenty-four hours before the Republican army established a blockade”) The southern tip of the peninsula, ranging from Cádiz to Seville, was now firmly controlled by the insurgents; however, they were isolated and in danger of being overrun. Francisco Franco arrived in Morocco on the morning of 19 July and took command of the troops. Since the protectorate was fully controlled, the battle-hardened Army of Africa was not required there; instead, the rebels needed the troops badly in Andalusia. The rebels initially had some 120,000 armed men; out of these, 40,000 were stationed in Africa. As sea transport no longer remained an option, the decision to commence an airlift was taken during a meeting of high commanders, presided over by Franco; it was reportedly suggested by Francisco Arranz Monasterio, a pilot-observer, industrial engineer and artillery captain. (Note: Allegedly Arranz had already by that point suggested turning to the Germans to obtain aircraft; Arranz spoke German and knew numerous Luftwaffe pilots, having met them at various airshows across Europe.)

== Airlift ==
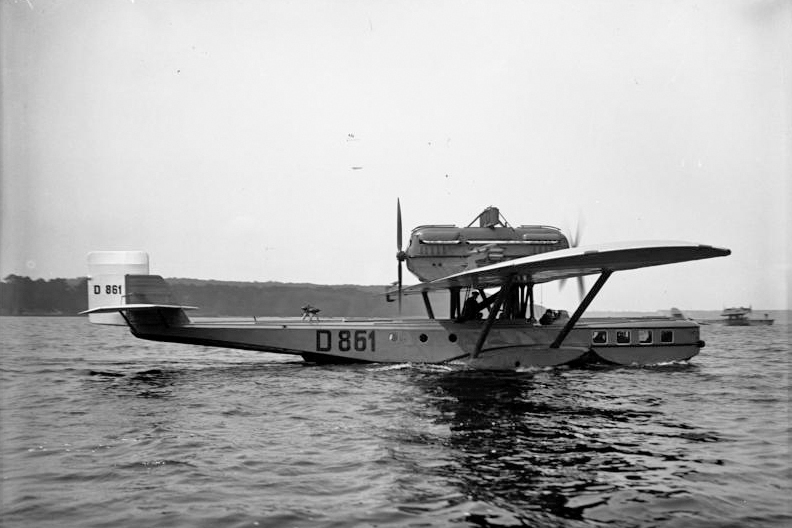
A civilian-configured Dornier Do J Wal, with the passenger cabin in the nose visible; the cockpit was in this area on the Spanish military Wals

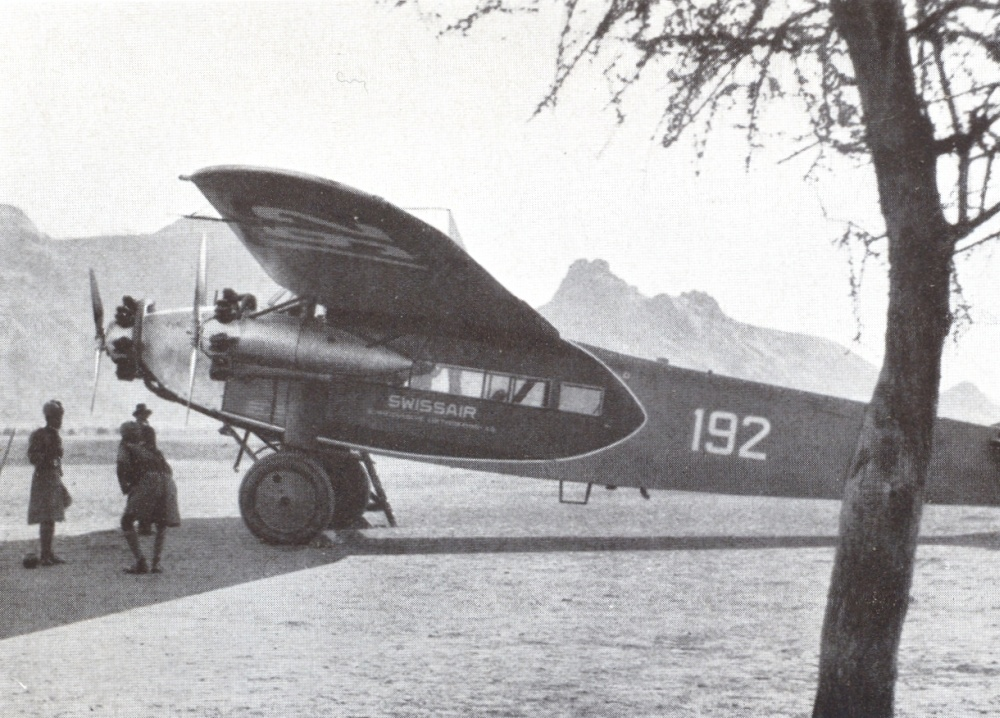
Fokker F.VII

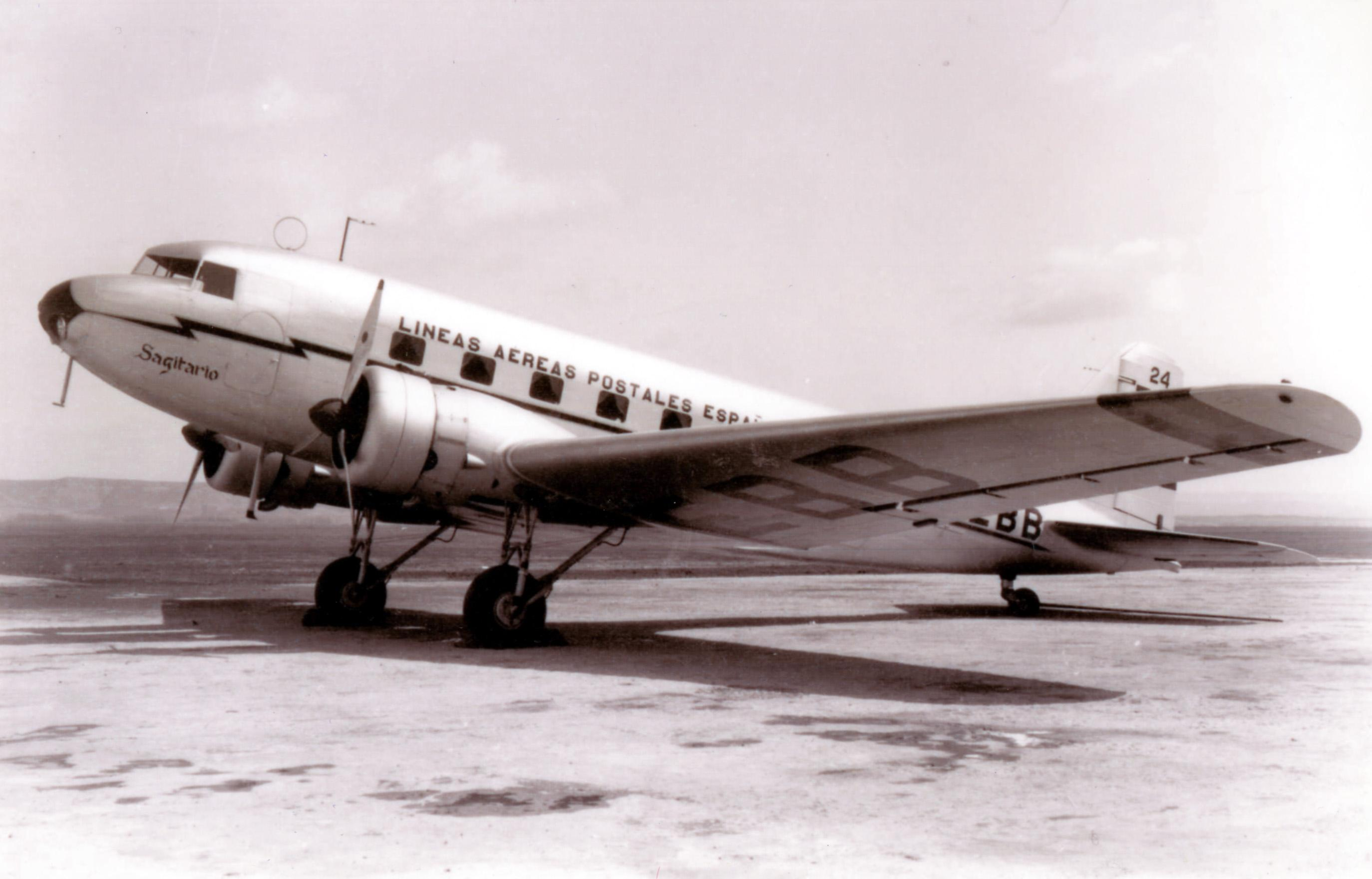
A Douglas DC-2 of Spain’s national airline Líneas Aéreas Postales Españolas (′Spanish Postal Airlines′), known by its initials LAPE. The rebels commandeered a LAPE DC-2 in the last week of July 1936 and employed it on the airlift

=== Early phase ===
During the early days of the rebellion, there were very few aircraft available for conducting an airlift from Spanish Morocco to Andalusia. Three Fokker F.VIIs were seized either at Seville airport or the airfield at Larache on the Atlantic coast of northern Morocco, (Note: Sources are extremely confusing as to the origin and location of the aircraft initially seized by the rebels in Andalusia and Morocco. One author claims the Fokkers were stationed at the Spanish outpost at Cabo Juby on the far south coast of Morocco and recalled to the Iberian peninsula by the Madrid government, but during intermediate stops one was seized in Larache and the other two in Seville. A somewhat different version is that the Fokkers and a Douglas DC-2 were ordered by the Madrid government to bomb the insurgents in Morocco, and that when coming back from the mission they were seized by the rebels, who in the meantime had taken control of the airport at Tablada.) and two military Dornier Do J Wal flying boats remained at the Cádiz naval base. (Note: It is also claimed that the rebels seized other Dornier flying boats in Melilla.) Already on the evening of 19 July, a Fokker F.VII transported troops from Sania Ramel airfield in Tetuán (located on the Tingitan Peninsula south of Ceuta, a few kilometres inland from the Mediterranean coast of Morocco) to Tablada airport in Seville. It carried nine legionnaires and their commander. When approaching Tablada airport the aircraft was fired at by ground troops, who were earlier bombed by Republican aircraft and suspected another bombing raid. (Note: On the other hand, soldiers in the aircraft thought the airport might have been re-taken by the loyalists. The pilot decided to land anyway and without shutting down the engines, the Fokker taxied towards the airport building. The legionnaires disembarked with bayonets fitted to their rifles, and it was only at this moment the ground troops started to cheer.)

Soon all five aircraft were engaged. The transport capacity was very limited: neither the Fokkers nor the Dorniers could have accommodated more than fifteen troops. The first unit airlifted was 17. Company of the 5. Bandera of the Foreign Legion, which regrouped in Andalusia on 20 July. The same day, a Junkers Ju 52 that was being operated by Germany’s national airline Deutsche Luft Hansa on an airmail flight from Gambia made an intermediate stop in the Canary Islands; the pilot was forced to fly to Tetuán, but instead of joining the airlift he carried Franco's mission to Berlin. (Note: With intermediate landings in Marseille and Stuttgart. A somewhat different version is given in another source. Another author claims that the Luft Hansa Junkers was seized by the Spanish rebels on 17 July; this seems rather unlikely given the fact that by that day, the rebellion had barely started.)

Aware of the insufficiency of available resources, on 23 July Franco cabled Hitler and Mussolini requesting transport aircraft; he also sent his personal envoys to Berlin (on the previously-detained Luft Hansa Ju 52) and Rome. The envoys managed to see Hitler on 25 July and on the same day the German dictator agreed to provide assistance. Mussolini was less decisive, but within 48 hours (Note: Some authors claim that Mussolini decided to send aircraft on 28 July, i.e. three days after Hitler.) he independently decided to do the same thing. Meanwhile on 25 July, the Nationalists seized a Douglas DC-2 – an American-manufactured fourteen-seat airliner, at the time one of the most-advanced aircraft types in the world – hitherto in civilian service with Spain’s national airline LAPE (Líneas Aéreas Postales Españolas – ′Spanish Postal Airlines′); this increased the maximum and purely theoretical daily transport capacity to some 130 men. (Note: There are conflicting claims regarding the number of aircraft initially involved; one author states that Franco "had only nine small military planes at his disposal". It is not clear what other aircraft (apart from the three Fokkers, two Dorniers and one Douglas) are counted as participating.) Prior to the arrival of the Ju 52s, the four DC-2s operated by LAPE were among the largest and most capable aircraft in Spanish civilian or military service.

=== German and Italian buildup ===
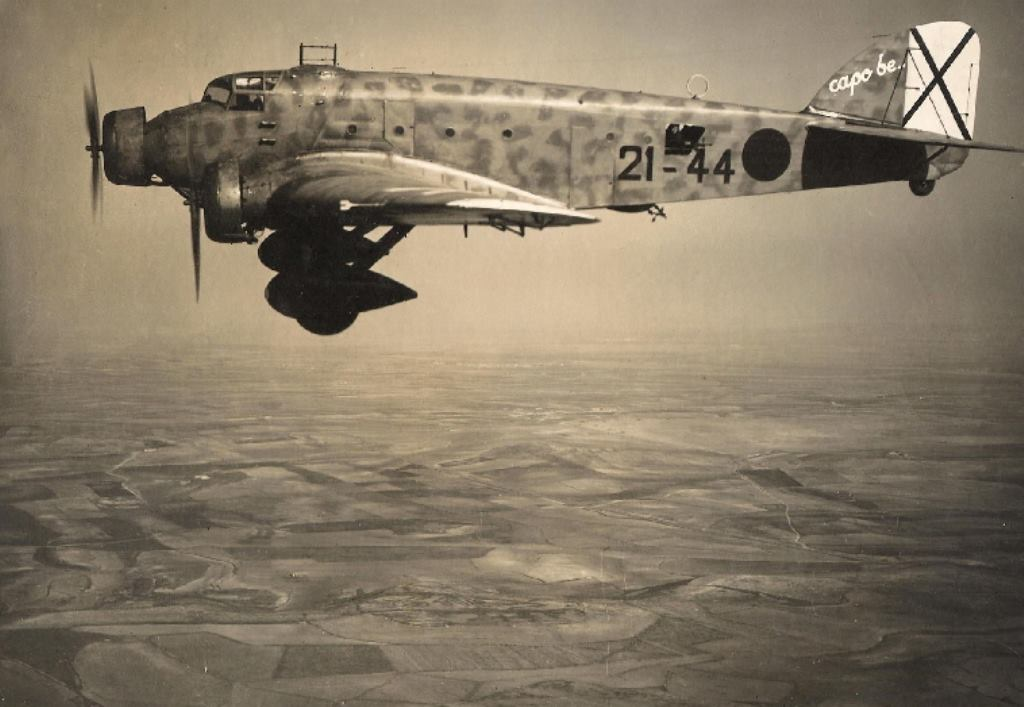
Italian SM.81 in Nationalist colors

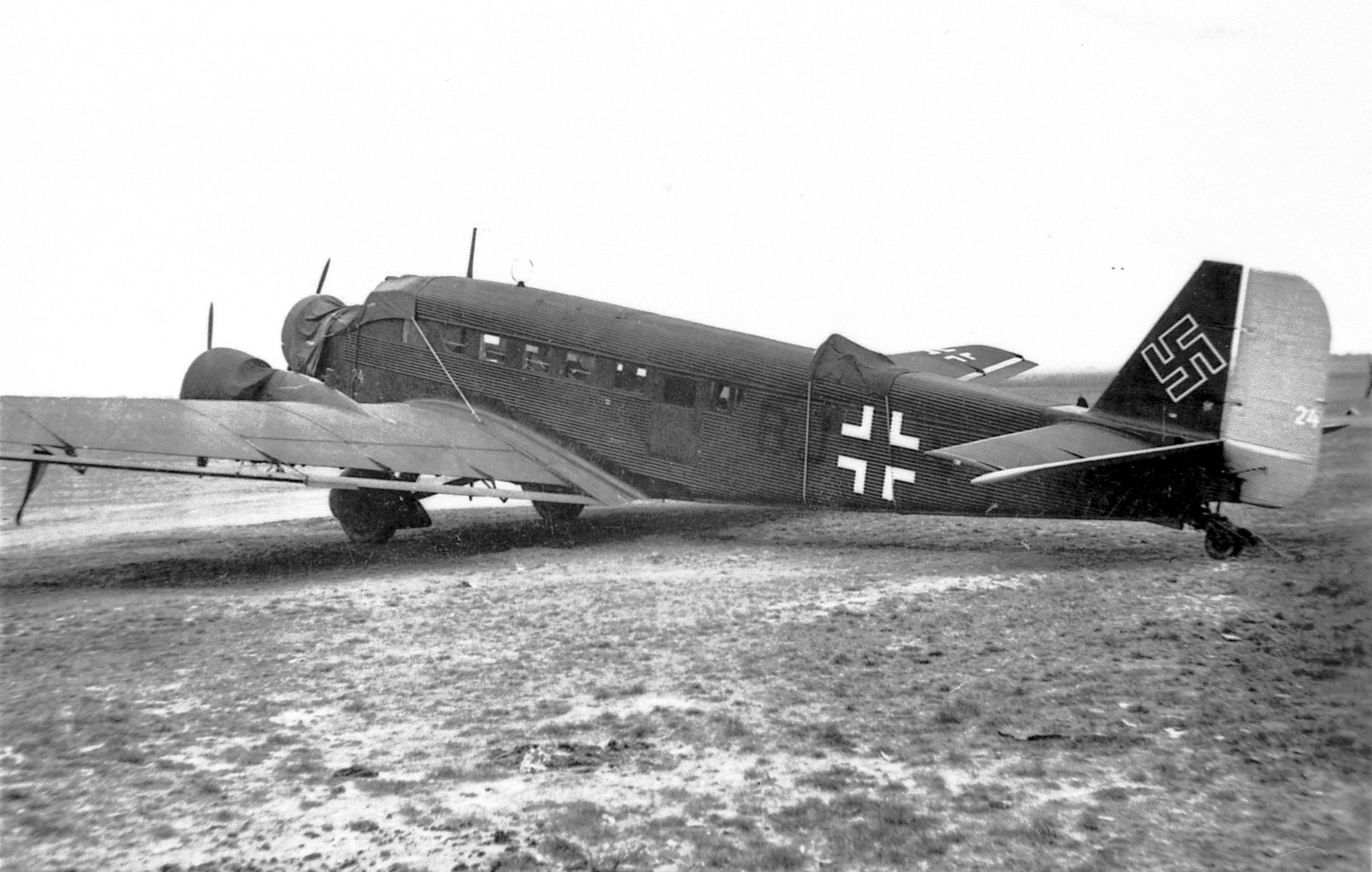
Junkers Ju 52

The operation was a complex and previously unheard of logistical undertaking, which involved refueling (purchase of fuel, transport, storage, pumping), repair and maintenance (staff, spare parts procurement, workshop availability, tools), handling of troops (transport, accommodation, assembly, waiting, boarding and disembarkation) and air-traffic management. The German and Italian aircraft were dispatched to Franco under conditions of secrecy. Both German and Italian aircraft were re-painted and stripped of their national symbols.

In Germany, the logistics were co-ordinated by General Helmuth Wilberg. The German effort was code-named Feuerzauber (‘Fire Magic’) and tried to appear as a civilian operation. The Germans set up a front company named Sociedad Hispano-Marroquí de Transportes (HISMA), to supposedly provide commercial transport services between Morocco and Spain; all Ju 52s were officially operated by this entity. The first Junkers Ju 52 sent by the Nazis arrived in Tetuán on 28 July; (Note: Authors claim various dates for the arrival of the first aircraft, the earliest being 27 July and the latest 1 August.) others arrived during the next few days. HISMA, ostensibly headquartered on Calle O'Donnel in Tetuán, was formally registered by the Spanish consul in Tetuán on 31 July. The man initially chosen to command the German detachment sent to Spain was Major Alexander von Scheele, who was succeeded by Colonel Walter Warlimont from 31 August. With Warlimont occupied by higher duties as the German operations in Spain expanded as the war intensified, the command was placed upon Oberleutnant Rudolf von Moreau. (Note: Some sources credit Alfredo Kindelán, who on 30 July became the head of the Nationalist air forces, with the organisation and execution of the entire airlift. Quote: “puente aéreo, organizado por el general Alfredo Kindelán con la ayuda de la aviación alemana” [“airlift, organised by General Alfredo Kindelán with the help of the German Air Force”] However, Kindelán spent the first days of the coup at his residence in Gibraltar, where he lived because of its excellent telephone exchange, (which offered international communication facilities — the British allowed him to call Berlin, Rome and Lisbon); before moving to Morocco. In early August he set up his headquarters in Seville.)

German Luftwaffe pilots volunteered for the operation; they travelled in plain clothes and if detained, they were to pose as tourists travelling under the auspices of the Reisegesellschaft Union (Union Travel Association), part of the Nazi leisure organisation Kraft durch Freude (‘Strength Through Joy’). On 9 August a civil-registered Ju 52 landed on an airfield at Azuaga, located north of Seville in territory held by the Republic, and its crew of four Germans was detained. Three of the four were carrying documents showing they were connected to Deutsche Luft Hansa, while the fourth had documents connecting him to the Junkers Dessau plant. It is not clear whether they were provided with false documentation, or whether indeed Luft Hansa/Junkers factory crew were manning a commercial Luft Hansa flight to Africa as claimed; this version of events was sustained officially by Auswärtiges Amt (the German Foreign ministry). Believing this or not, Republican authorities kept the aircraft but eventually allowed the four to return to Germany, before Republican Spain and Nazi Germany broke off all diplomatic relations. The German detachment included civilian mechanical and radio aircraft maintenance personnel, a medical officer, technicians, 25 Luftwaffe officers and 66 Luftwaffe non-commissioned officers.

The Italian personnel and their Savoia-Marchetti SM.81 Pipistrellos were drawn from Italy’s air force, the Regia Aeronautica. Similarly to the Germans, the Italians wore civilian clothes and were provided with fake documents. Both the crews and the SM.81s, which unlike the Germans’ Ju 52s, were unambiguously military aircraft capable of combat (they were dual-role bomber—transports, complete with two bomb bays, a bomb-aimer position and multiple defensive machine gun positions), were officially incorporated into the Tercio de Marruecos, (‘Tercio of Morocco’—the Spanish Foreign Legion) and posed as part of it, under the name Aviación del Tercio. The Italians soon established the Aviazione Legionaria (‘Legionary Aviation’) as their operations in support of the Nationalists expanded. The Italian air detachment was led at first by Colonel Ruggero Bonomi.

On 30 July the first Italian SM.81s landed in Nador (the closest airfield to Italy) on the northeastern coast of Morocco. They encountered strong headwinds on the delivery flight and as a result three of the twelve aircraft despatched never reached Morocco; they ran out of fuel en route and were lost. Other SM.81s arrived during the first few days of August; they were ready for operations by the end of the first week of the month. Whereas the Ju 52s either came on board a ship to Cádiz (the German passenger ship Usaramo arrived there on 6 August with at least sixteen aircraft), (Note: She had left Hamburg on 31 July. However, it is also claimed that she carried only Heinkel He 51 fighters.) or flew via Italy, the SM.81s flew directly from the Italian island of Sardinia.

Despite all the effort at subterfuge, Fascist and Nazi assistance quickly ceased to be a secret. Two of the SM.81s lost on the 30 July delivery flight went down in French territory and the ensuing investigation soon revealed the nature of their mission. British intelligence got wind of German assistance when they intercepted a message from the Spanish consul in Tangier; in early August the British vice-consul in Tetuán reported twenty “large aircraft” and German anti-Nazi workers in Hamburg provided more information. Later in August, the Communist propagandist Arthur Koestler saw foreign airmen in Seville, though there was no proof they were military. By September it had become widely known that German and Italian aircraft and men were heavily involved in transporting Franco’s troops to the peninsula.

=== Airlift flight operations ===
Initially, the flights were operated between Tetuán and Seville, a distance of approximately 200 kilometres (120 miles). However, once an improvised airfield a few kilometers south of Jerez de la Frontera had been sufficiently developed to permit its use in early August, flights from Morocco were re-directed to land there. With a distance between the two airfields of around 140 kilometres (90 miles), this allowed considerable savings in fuel usage. Because of their need to operate from water and their low cruising speed, the two Dornier flying boats were employed on the route from Ceuta (between Tetuán and Algeciras, on the Peninsula of Almina at the northeastern tip of the Tingitan Peninsula) to Algeciras, a distance of 30 kilometres (20 miles); as they were suffering mechanical wear and tear at a fast rate, they were later withdrawn from service altogether.

Area of Airlift Operations
Locations of Airlift Operations
1 Airlift main departure point
2 Airlift main destination
3 Airlift Dornier (and Convoy de la Victoria) departure point
4 Airlift Dornier (and Convoy de la Victoria) destination
5 Airlift initial destination (July-early August)
6 Initial arrival point of SM.81s

Following a day spent on the ground dedicated to preparations such as maintenance, the first Ju 52 joined the airlift on 29 July. When operated as a regular passenger aircraft, a Ju 52 would normally carry 17 passengers; with all seats removed, 35 densely packed soldiers were able to sit on the floor. (Note: It is also claimed that as many as 45 troops could be carried.) The Ju 52 was large enough to also accommodate howitzers and artillery pieces, with a total payload up to 3.5 tonnes. (Note: Ju 52s were equipped with wide doors, which enabled loading and unloading of large objects. Some models were also equipped with a sliding roof hatch, which enabled loading of very large objects from above by crane, but it is not clear whether this method was used in Morocco.) The SM.81s and Ju 52s were similar in overall size with an equivalent maximum takeoff weight, but with the two types having a markedly different empty weight, a Ju 52 could carry about 1,100 kilograms (2,400 lb) more payload than an SM.81.

The SM.81s joined the operation in the first week of August, after their fuel became available. On their first day of operations, 5 August, five of the SM.81s were deployed as bombers, providing air cover for a successful seaborne attempt by the Nationalists to transfer men and materiel across the Strait of Gibraltar in four transports escorted by warships, later to become known as the Convoy de la Victoria (‘Convoy of Victory’). Eight days later, on 13 August, two Ju 52s reconfigured as bombers sortied before dawn on a mission to attack the Republican battleship Jaime I, which was stationed at Málaga (southeast of Seville and northeast of the Strait of Gibraltar) and had an anti-aircraft armament that posed a significant threat to the aircraft of the airlift. One aircraft succeeded in bombing and damaging her. (Note: Sources are conflicting on the effect of the bombing; while Corum (2020) claims that Jaime I was hit twice amidships, was seriously damaged such that she was disabled and took no further part in the war, Nofi (2010) states that she was hit once on the bow with only slight damage. In light of Nofi’s disparagement of a contemporary newspaper account (under the headline "Franco's new pilots are accurate shots") in a footnote and the Wikipedia article about Jaime I describing the ship’s operations after the attack, Corum’s claims are probably inaccurate.)

The Nationalist fleet was complete by 10 August, with twenty Ju 52s (Note: Some sources provide the figure of 27 Ju 52s. However, some of them were used as bombing aircraft and not all were employed to carry troops across the straits. Another scholar claims twenty Ju 52s were made available to Franco.) and twelve SM.81s in place. Though unarmed, (Note: "Zwanzig unbewaffnete Ju 52 Transportmaschinen" (“twenty unarmed Ju 52 transport machines”) Most sources claim the Ju 52s were provided by the Luftwaffe's Kampfgeschwaders 153, 155 and 253, though there are sources which claim that at least some were provided by Deutsche Luft Hansa. According to one author, some Ju 52s were sent straight from the Junkers factory in Dessau.) they were manned and serviced by German and Italian military pilots and technicians. Up to this point, reportedly after 22 days of airlift operations a few thousand troops (exact figures differ) had already been carried by air across the straits; probably around half were transported by the Germans (in comparison, the so-called Convoy de la Victoria succeeded in transporting 1,600 men by sea on 5 August alone).

Withe the Ju 52s and SM.81s having a similar cruising speed, normally a one-way flight took around one hour to Seville and 40 minutes to Jerez. The more advanced retractable-gear DC-2 was faster, while the mid-1920s-era F.VIIs were considerably slower. Aircraft were usually flying at an altitude of 2,500–3,000 metres (8,000–10,000 ft) as they crossed the Strait of Gibraltar, mostly to avoid fire from the anti-aircraft guns mounted on Republican warships patrolling the straits. Even at the short distance from Ceuta to Algeciras, the two Dornier Wals, with their 145-kilometre-per-hour (90 mph; 80 kn) cruising speed and the need to avoid the warships, took a not-inconsiderable amount of time to make the journey.

Protection was initially provided by Nieuport-Delage NiD 52 fighters that the rebels had commandeered from the Aeronáutica Militar, stationed at Larache and Tetuán. Later they were joined by German Heinkel He 51 and Italian Fiat CR.32 fighters. As it was inefficient to provide cover for a single aircraft, the transports usually flew in a group. However, the flights received no opposition from Republican aircraft.

Most of the aircraft that were operational on a given day made a number of round-trip flights during that day. One source claims that when in service, an average Ju 52 was operating three or four round trips daily. However, given that there were 868 round-trip flights made by the German aircraft and recorded between their arrival in Morocco in late July and the end of the airlift on 11 October, the daily average per aircraft is around 0.6 round trips. (Note: To wit: 868 flights divided by 20 Ju 52s divided by 75 days) This suggests that days of intense flying were interspersed with days spent on the ground, when an aircraft was undergoing maintenance, repairs and refueling.

=== Operational achievements ===
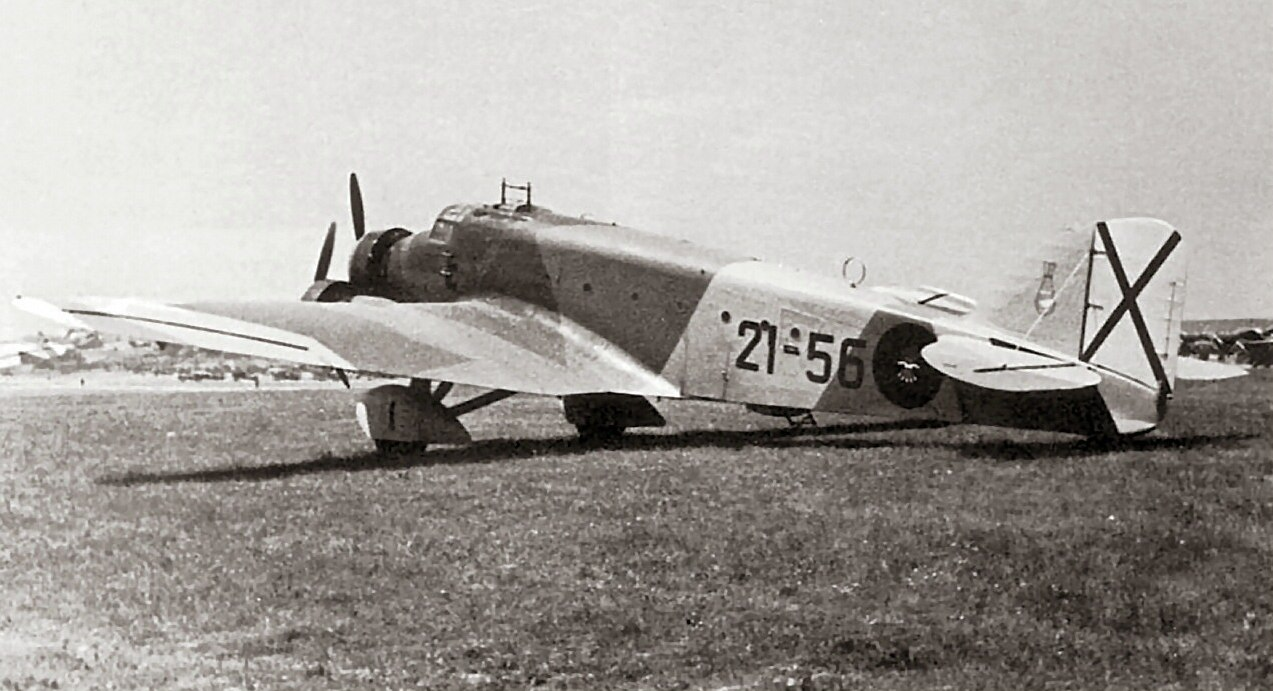
Savoia-Marchetti SM.81 in Nationalist markings

Before the first Ju 52 joined the airlift, the aircraft available to the Nationalists might have carried a few hundred men. During 102 round-trips in July, 837 men were transported. One author claims that once the Germans joined the operation, by 5 August 1,500 men were transported.

On 10 August Franco had 38 aircraft at his disposal, consisting of twenty Ju 52s; twelve SM.81s; and the three Fokkers, two Dorniers and the DC-2. This fleet would come to operate the airlift during the following two months, though some of them would be gradually withdrawn; for example, Franco started to use the much-faster and relatively-luxurious Douglas DC-2 as his personal aircraft, flying in it on visits to Mola and other commanders. According to one scholar “by the week of 10–16 August”, German aircraft alone carried 2,853 soldiers and 7.9 tonnes of equipment,

With each aircraft making one round-trip daily, in total, they were supposedly capable of carrying either 1,000 men or 100 tonnes per day. However, these figures were purely theoretical and actual daily transport rates were much lower. Not all aircraft were always available; every day up to half of them were undergoing repairs or maintenance, or were grounded while waiting for spare parts. There were also acute fuel shortages.

In practice, once the full fleet was assembled, on average, there were some 250 soldiers and five tonnes of materiel carried per day. (Note: One author claims that “fifteen thousand men crossed in ten days”. A popular synthesis maintains vaguely that “in just a few weeks, over 13,000 soldiers had crossed the Strait of Gibraltar”.) Depending upon circumstances the figures varied. According to detailed German records, some of their weekly figures for troops and cargo uplifted were: 700 men and 11.6 tonnes in the third week of August; 1,275 men and 35 tonnes in the fourth week of August; 1,200 men and 37 tonnes in the first week of September; 1,400 men and 49 tonnes in the second week; 1,120 men and 39 tonnes in the third week; and 1,550 men and 68 tonnes in the fourth week of September. One German pilot recollected that his personal record was 241 soldiers flown in one day. (Note: This figure does not seem very credible, as it implies that he made seven round trips with a full load of 35 troops on board. The time spent airborne would have been in excess of ten hours, plus time needed for boarding, disembarking, refuelling etc.) The ratio of men to equipment varied. Initially, priority was given to soldiers, while later there were weeks of increased materiel payloads; the record was the week in September that saw 69 tonnes of cargo being carried by air across the straits.

Another historian claims that by the middle of August there were already 15,000 troops on the peninsula, while another author writes that 15,000 had been flown by the end of August. These estimates imply an extraordinarily high daily average and suggest that during some 40 days of September and October there were only a few thousand flown. Other works do not confirm that the airlift became much less intense after August. German data suggest a fairly stable rate of transport. One source claims that in August there were 6,543 men flown during 353 missions, while in September the respective figures were 5,455 and 324. However, these figures are for Moroccan troops only. (Note: Another author claims that the Germans carried 7,350 men up to the end of August, 5,455 in September and 1,157 in October. Some amateur sources provide monthly figures of 2,063 men (July), 8,453 (August), 9,732 (September) and 2,300 (October), with the total of some 23,000 men flown; for materiel the figures are 0 (July), 104 tonnes (August), 240 tonnes (September) and 17 tonnes (October).)

=== Impediments to operations ===
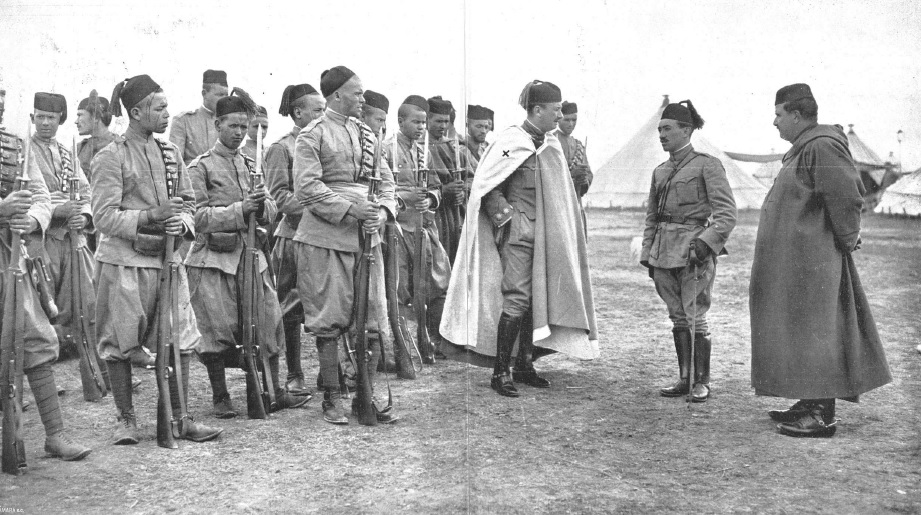
Regulares prior to World War I

The largest single problem in keeping the aircraft flying was the shortage of suitable fuel. Some amount was available in local stocks; efforts were made to purchase as much as possible from the Portuguese and from the British in Gibraltar. (Note: Major assistance in making commercial transactions was provided by local banks, especially Banco Hassán de Tetuán; it was managed and controlled by local Jewish bourgeoisie.) Some fuel was delivered by sea in Italian and German tankers. Following their arrival the SM.81s could not take part in the airlift before 4 August. This was because their Alfa Romeo engines required high-octane fuel, which was delivered by an Italian tanker on that day. Improvised measures involved producing aviation fuel by blending lower-grade fuel with various fluids, typically benzol, in drums and then rolling the drums to make sure the constituent liquids were properly mixed.

Aircraft were refuelled in Jerez de la Frontera rather than in Tetuán, as both Portuguese, British and German fuel was delivered to Andalusia. Nevertheless, with its rudimentary infrastructure not ready to handle such heavy traffic, at Jerez airfield the refuelling operations were exceedingly unsatisfactory; sherry pumps (in plentiful supply in Jerez, due to the city being the centre of sherry production) were pressed into use to refuel the aircraft, however their pumping rate was very low — some three litres (less than one gallon) per minute, while each three-engine F.VII, Ju 52 and SM.81 consumed hundreds of litres of fuel on a single round trip.

Another major problem was the Saharan sand, responsible for excess wear of components; there was no solution found, except covering the engines when the aircraft were idle. Extreme heat made maintenance service difficult during the day, and much work was carried out at night. Some mechanics trying to work during daytime fainted, and some had their hands burnt when they picked up tools that had been left in the sun. Every so often the interiors of the aircraft had to be cleaned, as transported soldiers frequently became airsick and the Moroccan regulares at times carried onboard with them animals such as goats (to be later slaughtered for food).

The Republican air force proved to be the least of the problems faced. Though the Malaga air commander demanded “a good hunting squad” to be relocated to his airbase, the Republican air command did not react. There was not a single case of Republican aircraft attacking the Nationalist airlift. (Note: One author speculates about the apparently inexplicable lack of Republican reaction and attributes it to chaos, lack of experienced commanders, and anxiety to not cause an incident with the British.) Exact losses are unclear; it is known that, apart from the aircraft which on 9 August mistakenly landed in Azuaga, the Germans lost only one Ju 52, in a ground collision on an airfield. A few machines may have been lost by the Italians, though none in combat.

=== End of the airlift ===
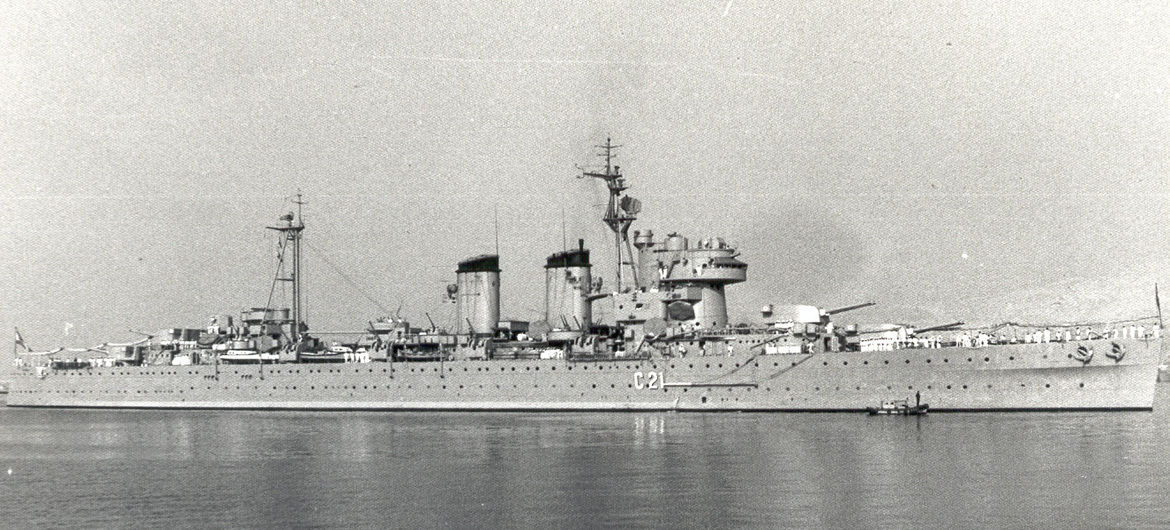
Canarias

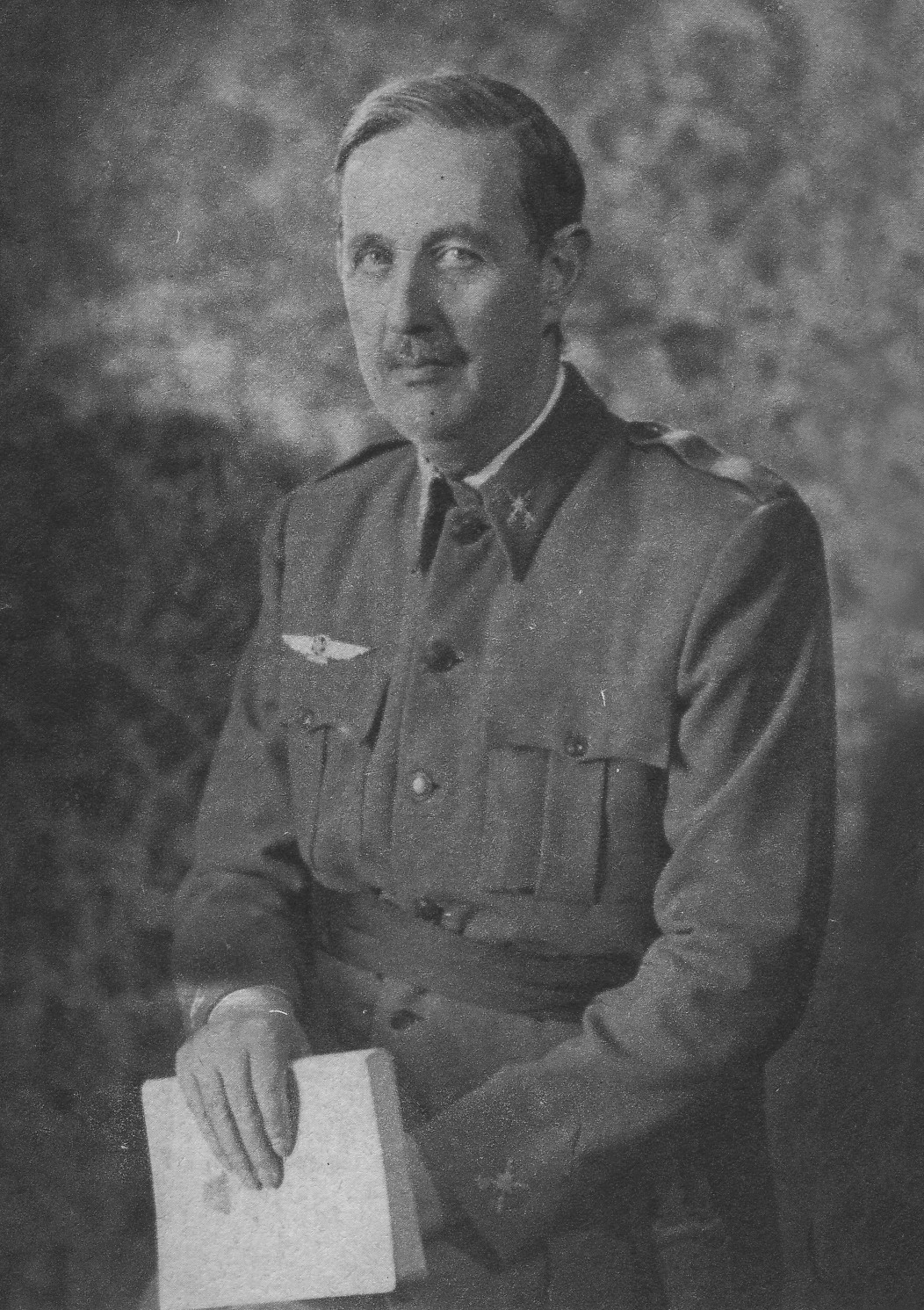
Alfredo Kindelán

On 29 September 1936, the Nationalist naval force led by the cruiser Canarias engaged and defeated the Republican fleet during the Battle of Cabo Spartel. After this defeat, the Republican naval command no longer attempted to control the straits and withdrew the Republican warships to their naval bases, where they mostly remained idle. The Nationalists immediately resumed their transport of troops from Morocco to Andalusia by sea. After ten days it was concluded that the maritime route across the straits was fully safe, and that there was no longer a need for an airlift. It was effectively terminated on 11 October 1936. Sources provide conflicting figures as to the number of troops and tonnage of equipment transported in total during the entire exercise, which lasted for 85 days between 19 July and 11 October. The figure usually referred to is “over 20,000”, but Alfredo Kindelán, who was nominated by Franco as the head of his air forces on 30 July, claimed there were only 14,000 men. There are also more vague estimates of “between 14,000 and 23,000 men”. The total load of materiel transported is at times given as 270 tonnes, (Note: Kindelán claims 283 tonnes, though other sources refer to this figure as equipment carried by the Germans only. The figure of 400 tonnes is also quoted.) At least 36 artillery pieces were transported. The Germans are credited as the key component of the airlift, responsible for transportation of some 13,000 troops and 270 tonnes of cargo, though it is also claimed that the Germans carried 17,000 soldiers.

== Assessment ==
The operation of flying troops and equipment from Morocco to Andalusia is often referred to as “the first airlift in military history” or in similar terms. (Note: Including “first major military airlift in history”; “first major troop airlift in history”; “first major airlift in history” “first airlift of a significant magnitude”; or simply “history’s first airlift”.) Some authors noted it as “major innovation in air doctrine”, though others, when discussing innovations introduced during the Spanish Civil War, did not mention it. Some credit the Nationalist command in Morocco for “resourcefulness”. It is often maintained that the airlift turned the odds in favor of the insurgents. One author underlines that “it is no exaggeration to say that the airlift saved the Nationalist cause in the summer of 1936”, and another maintains that the airlift was a “decisive factor in giving Franco the advantage in the struggle for power”. Hitler himself claimed most of the credit; in 1942 he commented that “Franco ought to erect a monument to the glory of the Junkers 52”. This thesis is not infrequently repeated by present-day historians. One author claims that “Mussolini and Hitler turned a coup d’etat going wrong into a bloody and prolonged civil war”. One source claims that without German and Italian assistance, flying the entire army of Africa would have taken nine months, Another notes that “Nazi and Fascist military aid was considerable and decisive for Franco's victory”. In popular narratives the thesis is even more bold: “Ju-52 [sic]: German transport aircraft which enabled Franco to win the Civil War”. However, there are historians who claim that Franco already had enough soldiers flown in to control the situation in Andalusia prior to the arrival of German and Italian aircraft; or who believe that foreign assistance was important, but not crucial, one noting that "all that the German and Italian aircraft really did [was] to speed up the process of getting the Army of Africa into action".

== See also ==
- Airbridge (logistics)
- German involvement in the Spanish Civil War
- Italian military intervention in Spain
- Operational history of the Savoia-Marchetti SM.81
- The Hump – United States Army Air Forces airlift in World War II
