= Detachment Kuhlmey =

Gefechtsverband Kuhlmey
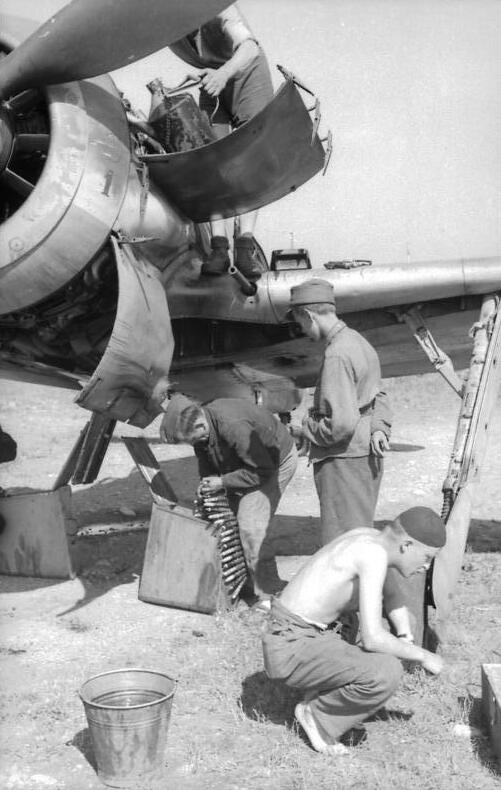
- A Fw 190A-6 belonging to 4./JG 54 being serviced at Immola in June 1944.
- Active: 13 June 1944 – 13 August 1944
- Country: Nazi Germany
- Branch: Luftwaffe
- Type: Dive bomber, fighter-bomber, fighter aircraft
- Role: Close air support, air superiority
- Part of: Luftwaffe
- Engagements: Fourth Strategic Offensive

Commanders
- Notable commanders: Kurt Kuhlmey (13 Jun – 13 Aug 1944)

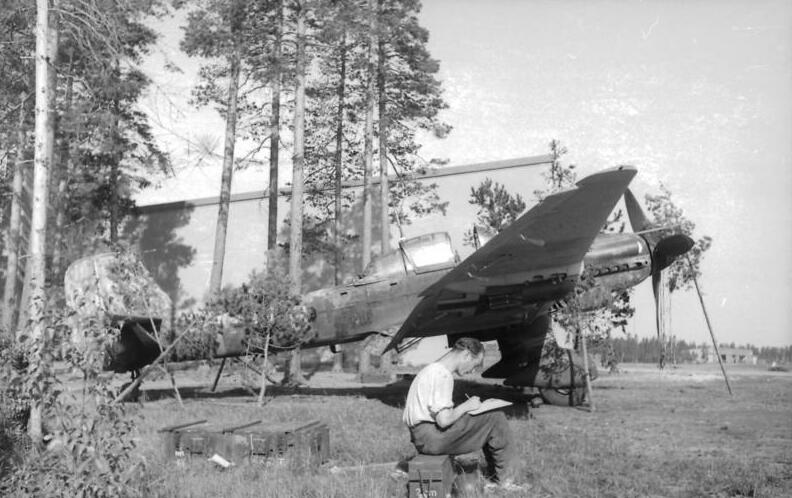
A Ju 87D-5, belonging to 1./SG 3 at Immola on June 21, 1944.

Detachment Kuhlmey (German: Gefechtsverband Kuhlmey) was a temporary unit of Nazi Germany's Luftwaffe during World War II. The unit was commanded by Oberstleutnant Kurt Kuhlmey and the detachment was built around the unit Schlachtgeschwader 3, which also was commanded by Kuhlmey.

== Operational history ==
The unit participated in large battles in summer 1944, during the Finnish-Soviet Continuation War. When the Soviet Red Army launched its fourth strategic offensive on 9 June 1944 C. G. E. Mannerheim asked Nazi Germany for help. Among the help that arrived was a Luftwaffe unit that arrived in Finland on 12 June. The aircraft landed at the Immola Airfield on 17 June. The unit used the whole airfield from there on. The unit flew some 2,700 missions and dropped 770 tons of bombs. It destroyed over 150 Soviet aircraft, about 200 tanks, and dozens of bridges and transport vessels. Personnel losses included 23 pilots killed and 24 wounded in battle. The unit lost 41 of its aircraft.

The detachment consisted of some 70 airworthy aircraft to support the 200 strong Finnish force, but its operational strength varied due to losses, additions and troop movements. The unclear structure is partly explained by the Luftwaffe replacement programs, where older Junkers Ju 87 "Stuka" dive bombers were replaced by Focke-Wulf Fw 190 Jabo's (fighter-bombers).

According to this, II./SG 3 was training at Jēkabpils, I./SG 5 in Pori, and III and IV./JG 54 in Illesheim, and they could not participate in the fighting on the Karelian Isthmus. I./SG 3, which was in Finland, received new Fw 190 aircraft as soon as they left Finland for Tartu.

== Organisation ==
The following units and aircraft in Finland belonged to Detachment Kuhlmey:

- I./SG 3: 33 Junkers Ju 87 D-5 Stuka dive bombers
- II./JG 54: 29–62 Focke-Wulf Fw 190 A-6 fighters
- I./SG 5: 16 Focke-Wulf Fw 190 F-3 and F-8 jabos at Alakurtti.
- I./NaGr 5: 1–8 Messerschmitt Bf 109 G-8 reconnaissance aircraft

The transport squadron TGr.10 of German aligned Italy's air force that operated in the theater also supported the unit, and it consisted of 35 Savoia Marchetti SM.81/AR transport aircraft and a number of transport, liaison and reconnaissance aircraft.

The majority of the aircraft of the unit left Finland on 23 July, but I/SG 5 who stayed until 13 August. A memorial was raised at the Immola Airfield on 23 July 1994 in gratitude and in memory of the unit.
