= Karl Christ =

German flying ace

- Born: 15 June 1897; Darmstadt, Grand Duchy of Hesse
- Died: 15 March 1990 (aged 92); Mannheim, Germany
- Burial place: Mannheim, Germany
- Military career
- Allegiance: Germany
- Branch: Flying service
- Service years: 1915–1918, 1940–1944
- Rank: Oberst
- Units: Bombengeschwader 2; Kampfgeschwader 5; Kampfgeschwader 6; Jagdstaffel 28
- Awards: Iron Cross
- Other work: Served in Luftwaffe during World War II.

Colonel Karl Christ (15 June 1897 – 15 March 1990) was a World War I flying ace credited with five aerial victories. He enlisted again during early World War II.

== Biography ==
Karl Christ was born on 15 June 1897 in Darmstadt, the Grand Duchy of Hesse, in the German Empire. In January 1915, he joined the Die Fliegertruppen des deutschen Kaiserreiches (the German flying service). He trained with Fliegerersatz-Abteilung (Replacement Detachment) 6 at Grosenheim.

He began service with Kampfgeschwader 6. By 1916, he was serving in Kampfgeschwader 5, a tactical bomber wing subordinate to the German Supreme Command. During this period, Christ won both classes of the Iron Cross.

Christ was commissioned a Leutnant on 23 March 1917 while serving with another bombing wing under the German Supreme Command—Bombengeschwader 2. In November 1917, he left Bogohl 2; the following month he joined Jagdstaffel 28, a single-seat fighter squadron, for service through war's end. Between 14 May and 14 October 1918, he had five of his six victory claims confirmed, though details are lacking on the last pair.

== World War II service ==
From 1 April 1941 through February 1942, Karl Christ was an Oberst with a Stuka geschwader in North Africa.

== Awards ==
- Iron Cross (1914) 2nd and 1st Class
- Hessische Tapferkeits-Medaille
- German Cross in Gold on 5 June 1942 as Oberstleutnant in Sturzkampfgeschwader 3

Military offices
Preceded by none	Commander of Sturzkampffliegerschule 2; 31 July 1940 – 7 February 1941	Succeeded by Oberstleutnant Hermann Edert
Preceded by Oberstleutnant Georg Edert	Commander of Sturzkampfgeschwader 3; 1 April 1941 – 1 September 1941	Succeeded by Oberst Walter Sigel
Preceded by unknown	Commander of Sturzkampffliegerschule 2; 17 April 1942 – Mai 1943	Succeeded by Sturzkampfgeschwader 102
Preceded by Sturzkampffliegerschule 2	Commander of Sturzkampfgeschwader 102; Mai 1943 – June 1943	Succeeded by Major Bernhard Hamester
Preceded by none	Commander of Sturzkampfgeschwader 151; 17 May 1943 – 18 October 1943	Succeeded by Schlachtgeschwader 151
Preceded by Sturzkampfgeschwader 151	Commander of Schlachtgeschwader 151; 18 October 1943 – 6 December 1944	Succeeded by Oberst Helmut Bruck
