= Walter Sigel =

German officer and Knight's Cross recipient

- Sigel as an Oberstleutnant
- Born: 12 January 1906; Ulm
- Died: 8 May 1944 (aged 38); Trondheimsfjord
- Military career
- Allegiance: Nazi Germany
- Branch: Luftwaffe
- Service years: 1934–1944
- Rank: Oberst (colonel)
- Commands: StG 3
- Conflicts: World War II
- Awards: Knight's Cross of the Iron Cross with Oak Leaves

Walter Sigel (12 January 1906 – 8 May 1944) was a German air officer during World War II. He was a recipient of the Knight's Cross of the Iron Cross with Oak Leaves of Nazi Germany. He led the German bombers during the bombing of Wieluń, the first aerial bombing (and has been described as the first war crime) of the war. Sigel died on 8 May 1944 after crashing his aircraft into Trondheim Fjord.

Sigel was the commanding officer of Sturzkampfgeschwader 76 during the Junkers Ju 87 dive bombing demonstration at Neuhammer, present-day Świętoszów, Poland, on 15 August 1939. Observing the demonstration were the senior Luftwaffe commanders, including Generals Hugo Sperrle, Bruno Loerzer, and Wolfram von Richthofen. The lower cloud layer, which was believed to be at 900 metres (3,000 ft), was only at 100 metres (330 ft). While Sigel managed to just barely pull out in time, 13 other Ju 87 crews crashed to their death. The event became known as the "Neuhammer Stuka Disaster" (Neuhammer Stuka-Unglück).

== Awards and decorations ==
- Flugzeugführerabzeichen
- Front Flying Clasp of the Luftwaffe
- Iron Cross (1939)
  - 2nd Class (17 September 1939)
  - 1st Class (20 June 1940)
- German Cross in Gold on 24 April 1942 as Major in the I./Sturzkampfgeschwader 3
- Knight's Cross of the Iron Cross with Oak Leaves
  - Knight's Cross on 21 July 1940 as Hauptmann and Gruppenkommandeur of I./Sturzkampfgeschwader 3 (Note: According to Scherzer as Gruppenkommandeur of the I./Sturzkampfgeschwader 76.)
  - 116th Oak Leaves on 2 September 1942 as Oberstleutnant and Geschwaderkommodore of Schlachtgeschwader 3

== Notes ==
=== Bibliography ===
- Brütting, Georg (1992) [1976]. Das waren die deutschen Stuka-Asse 1939 – 1945 [These were the German Stuka Aces 1939 – 1945] (in German) (7th ed.). Stuttgart, Germany: Motorbuch. ISBN 978-3-87943-433-6.
- Fellgiebel, Walther-Peer [in German] (2000) [1986]. Die Träger des Ritterkreuzes des Eisernen Kreuzes 1939–1945 – Die Inhaber der höchsten Auszeichnung des Zweiten Weltkrieges aller Wehrmachtteile [The Bearers of the Knight's Cross of the Iron Cross 1939–1945 – The Owners of the Highest Award of the Second World War of all Wehrmacht Branches] (in German). Friedberg, Germany: Podzun-Pallas. ISBN 978-3-7909-0284-6.
- Goss, Chris (2020). Luftwaffe Aces in the Battle of Britain. Air World. ISBN 978-1-5267-5424-0.
- Patzwall, Klaus D.; Scherzer, Veit (2001). Das Deutsche Kreuz 1941 – 1945 Geschichte und Inhaber Band II [The German Cross 1941 – 1945 History and Recipients Volume 2] (in German). Norderstedt, Germany: Verlag Klaus D. Patzwall. ISBN 978-3-931533-45-8.
- Scherzer, Veit (2007). Die Ritterkreuzträger 1939–1945 Die Inhaber des Ritterkreuzes des Eisernen Kreuzes 1939 von Heer, Luftwaffe, Kriegsmarine, Waffen-SS, Volkssturm sowie mit Deutschland verbündeter Streitkräfte nach den Unterlagen des Bundesarchives [The Knight's Cross Bearers 1939–1945 The Holders of the Knight's Cross of the Iron Cross 1939 by Army, Air Force, Navy, Waffen-SS, Volkssturm and Allied Forces with Germany According to the Documents of the Federal Archives] (in German). Jena, Germany: Scherzers Militaer-Verlag. ISBN 978-3-938845-17-2.
- Thomas, Franz (1998). Die Eichenlaubträger 1939–1945 Band 2: L–Z [The Oak Leaves Bearers 1939–1945 Volume 2: L–Z] (in German). Osnabrück, Germany: Biblio-Verlag. ISBN 978-3-7648-2300-9.

Military offices
Preceded by Oberstleutnant Karl Christ	Commander of Sturzkampfgeschwader 3; 1 September 1941 – 1 April 1943	Succeeded by Oberst Kurt Kuhlmey
