= Kurt Kuhlmey =

German general

- Born: 19 November 1913; Insterburg, East Prussia
- Died: 30 April 1993 (aged 79); Bonn
- Military career
- Allegiance: Nazi Germany; West Germany
- Branch: Luftwaffe; German Air Force
- Service years: 1934–1945; 1956–1971
- Rank: Generalmajor
- Commands: SG 3 SG 2; 5th Air Force Division
- Conflicts: World War II; Invasion of Poland; Battle of France; Battle of Norway; Battle of Britain; Battle of Malta; Battle of Tali-Ihantala; Tartu Offensive
- Awards: Knight's Cross of the Iron Cross

Kurt Kuhlmey (19 November 1913 – 30 April 1993) was a general in the West German Air Force. During World War II, he served as ground-attack aircraft pilot in the Luftwaffe, commanding two air wings. Kuhlmey flew over 500 combat missions, and in July 1942 was awarded the Knight's Cross of the Iron Cross.

== Career ==
Kuhlmey began his career as a pilot at the age of 15, when he began flying gliders. In 1934 he joined the Luftwaffe, which trained him as a pilot. He was commissioned and transferred in 1936 to the 162nd dive bomber division in Schwerin, where he began flying Stukas.

Kuhlmey was Staffelkapitän (squadron leader) of 1./Sturzkampfgeschwader 1 (StG 1) at the outbreak of war and participated in the German campaigns in Poland, Norway, France, and the Battle of Britain. He also took part in operations against Malta, including the 10 January 1941 Stuka attack on Illustrious.

As part of I./StG 2 Kuhlmey participated in the invasion of the Soviet Union in June 1941. He served in North Africa, becoming Gruppenkommandeur (group commander) of II./StG 3 in April 1942. On 18 October 1943 he was promoted to Geschwaderkommodore (wing commander), Schlachtgeschwader 3 (SG 3).

On 9 June 1944 the Soviet Union launched a major offensive on the Karelian Isthmus. The Soviet Army forced the Finns to abandon their defensive lines and on 20 June took Viipuri, the second largest city of Finland. As a reinforcement SG 3 was posted to Finland in June 1944, forming Gefechtsverband Kuhlmey (Detachment Kuhlmey) with Oberst Kuhlmey commanding a composite unit comprising elements of I./SG 3, I./SG 5, II./JG 54 and NAGr.1.

Detachment Kuhlmey's actions in Finland during 16 June and 21 July 1944 was hugely influential in the outcome of the offensive and of the Finnish Continuation War. Together Finnish Air Force units and Detachment Kuhlmey made 1,020 bombing sorties against the Soviet troops and armour. The Soviets lost some 300 tanks, 120–280 aircraft and over 20,000 troops. As a result, the Soviet advance stalled, and ensuing peace talks led to a cease-fire between the Soviet Union and Finland on 4 September. Finland was therefore not invaded. This battle is usually considered as the swan song of Junkers Ju 87 Stuka. Although Ju 87 served in some units even after that campaign, Ju 87 was superseded by Fw 190F Jabo in most units.

Leaving SG 3 in December 1944, by March 1945 Oberst Kuhlmey was Geschwaderkommodore of SG 2 "Immelmann", and in the last weeks of the war was on the staff of the General der Schlachtflieger.

After being released from American captivity in July 1945, he rejoined the military in November 1955, as a colonel. Attending courses at Williams and Luke Air Force Base in the US, he received flying training on the F-104 "Starfighter". On 11 September 1959 he was promoted to brigadier general and retired a major general. He died on 30 April 1993. At his funeral there was a wreath "from a grateful Finland".

== Awards ==
- German Cross in Gold on 5 November 1941 as Hauptmann in the 1./Sturzkampfgeschwader 1
- Knight's Cross of the Iron Cross on 15 July 1942 as Hauptmann and Gruppenkommandeur of the II./Sturzkampfgeschwader 3

Military offices
Preceded by Obstleutnant Walter Sigel	Commander of Sturzkampfgeschwader 3; 1 April 1943 – 18 October 1943	Succeeded by Schlachtgeschwader 3
Preceded by Sturzkampfgeschwader 3	Commander of Schlachtgeschwader 3; 18 October 1943 – 15 December 1944	Succeeded by Major Bernhard Hamester
Preceded by Oberstleutnant Friedrich Lang	Commander of Schlachtgeschwader 2 Immelmann; 14 March 1945 – 20 April 1945	Succeeded by Oberst Hans-Ulrich Rudel
Preceded by —	Commander of 5. Luftwaffendivision (Bundeswehr); 1963 – 31 March 1968	Succeeded by Generalmajor Eberhard Gralka
