= Sturzkampfgeschwader 3 =

Luftwaffe dive bomber wing during World War II

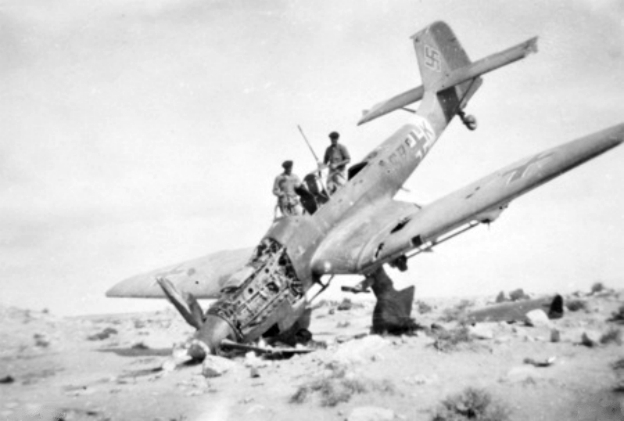
- A wrecked StG 3 Ju 87 examined by Australian soldiers, 1942/3
- Active: 9 July 1940 – 18 October 1943
- Country: Nazi Germany
- Branch: Luftwaffe
- Type: Dive bomber
- Role: Close air support Offensive counter air Anti-tank warfare Air interdiction Maritime interdiction
- Size: Air Force Wing
- Engagements: World War II

Commanders
- Notable commanders: Karl Angerstein; Kurt Kuhlmey

Insignia
- Identification symbol: S7

Sturzkampfgeschwader 3 (StG 3—Dive Bomber Wing 3) was a Dive bomber wing in the German Luftwaffe during World War II and operated the Junkers Ju 87 Stuka.

The wing was activated on 9 July 1940 using personnel from German medium bomber and other dive-bomber units. StG 3 was one of the few dive bomber units created during the war.

StG 3 fought its first campaign in the Battle of Britain a short time after formation. In 1941 it served in the Balkans Campaign and then some groups served on the Eastern Front, from 1943, until being disbanded.

The wing operated through most of the North African Campaign and some of its units fought to destruction there. StG 3 also served in the Battle of the Mediterranean and spearheaded the last German campaign-sized victory in the Dodecanese campaign in autumn 1943.

The wing redesignated to Schlachtgeschwader 3 (Battle Wing) on 18 October 1943.

== Formation ==
The Luftwaffe possessed several dive-bomber wings equipped with the Junkers Ju 87 Stuka in mid-1940; the Ju 87 having proved its effectiveness. StG 1, StG 2 and StG 77 were most experienced. A fourth wing, aside from smaller units such as StG 5, 76 and 151, was formed to increase dive bomber capability and organisation.

A Stabsstaffel (command staffel) was formed from Stab./KG 28 (Kampfgeschwader 28 — Bomber Wing 28) at Dinard, France on 9 July 1940. According to strength reports, the command staff had four Dornier Do 17Z, one Do 17M, and two Heinkel He 111H aircraft all previously operated by KG 28. There is no mention of any Ju 87s with the Stab./StG 3 in 1940. By 13 August 1940 StG 3 had been subordinated to Fliegerkorps IV under Luftflotte 3. The command unit was relocated to Brètigny, south of Paris. Oberst Karl Angerstein became the wing's first commanding officer (Geschwaderkommodore) but was replaced on 27 July by Oberstleutnant Hermann Edert.

I./StG 3 was formed near Barly, southwest of Arras. The strength of the group is unknown, but the experienced Major Walter Sigel as commanding officer (Gruppekommandeur). II./StG 3 was formed from I./StG 1 at either El Agheila or Agedabia on 13 January 1942. Hauptmann Kurt Kuhlmey commanded the group. The same day III./StG 3 was formed at San Pancrazio, Italy by renaming II./StG 2. Major Walter Enneccerus became commanding officer.

IV.(Erg)/StG 3 was created in August 1941 at Würzburg as an Ergänzungsstaffel/StG 3. The unit provided six to eight weeks of operational experience to crews fresh out of flight school. It was expanded to two staffeln. The group was based in Italy, Greece and Yugoslavia. In 1943 it was involved in Bandenbekämpfung operations in the Balkans.

== War Service ==
World War II in Europe began with the German invasion of Poland on 1 September 1939, in collaboration with the Soviet Union. After Polish resistance ended in October 1939 the Phoney War set in a period of stalemate. On 10 May 1940 German forces (Wehrmacht) invaded Western Europe. The Battle of the Netherlands, Battle of Belgium, Battle of France ended in a German victory which surprised the German General Staff.

In July 1940, after failing to induce the British to surrender or enter into a negotiated peace, Adolf Hitler resolved to knock the British Empire out of the war. The German Luftwaffe was ordered to cut off and destroy British sea communications in the English Channel and gain air superiority, as a prelude to a threatened seaborne in invasion (Operation Sea Lion).

=== Battle of Britain ===
Stab./StG 3 and the solitary group under its command were ordered to attack shipping in the Kanalkampf phase of the Battle of Britain. The wing was moved to the Cherbourg Peninsula. It used airstrips near to the port city and Théville as forward staging areas, in close proximity to British shipping in the Channel.

On 29 July StG 3 recorded its first major action. A formation of Ju 87s were ordered to attack convoys passing through the Channel. It consisted of 48 Ju 87s from six Staffeln of IV.(Stuka)/LG 1, II./StG 1 and II./StG 3. The escort consisted of 80 Bf 109s from JG 51 and III./JG 26, the former led by Adolf Galland on a temporary basis. RAF Fighter Command sent 501 and 41 Squadron to intercept. 501 Squadron attacked the Ju 87s as they began to dive and the harbour suffered little damage. I./StG 3 reported one damaged, 501 Squadron suffering no losses. The steamer SS Gronland was sunk in the outer harbour, having already been damaged in the attacks of 25 July and 19 crew were killed and the patrol yacht Gulzar was sunk but the crew were saved; Sandhurst was destroyed. The men of Sandhurst received six mentions in dispatches and the Dover port personnel were awarded four George Medals—the last to Tug Harbour Master Captain F. J. Hopgood.

Three days later StG 3 recorded their first fatalities when three men from Stab./StG 3 were killed in an accident. On 8 August StG 3 formed part of the strike force that attacked Convoy Peewit off the Isle of Wight. StG 3 lost three Stukas from I. Gruppe and two damaged. Oberleutnant Martin Müller was the wing's notable casualty. Four men were killed, two missing and two wounded. StG 3's assailants were 145 and 609 Squadron. The Ju 87s severely damaged SS Surte, MV Scheldt and SS Omlandia and sank SS Balmaha soon after. SS Tres was sunk by StG 77. SS Empire Crusader in the lead, was hit by StG 2 and sank several hours later; four ships were sunk and four were damaged in the attacks.

StG 3 was not listed on the order of battle on 13 August 1940–for Adlertag. It may have had the missions cancelled due to bad weather. StG 3 formed part of a major attack on The Hardest Day, on 18 August. StG 3 sent 22 Ju 87s to attack RAF Gosport. The dive-bombers were supported by 157 Bf 109s; 70 from JG 27; 32 from JG 53 acting as close escort; and 55 from JG 2 which was to sweep the Portsmouth area in advance of the main raid independently.

Sigel's Ju 87s, with no air opposition, swooped onto their targets causing large-scale damage. At Gosport, five aircraft were destroyed and five damaged. Several buildings were wrecked and two hangars damaged. But there were no casualties. The Ju 87 attack had been accurate, and no bombs fell outside the military compounds. In the Gosport area, 10 barrage balloons were shot down and two damaged.

The high losses of Ju 87 encouraged the Oberkommando der Luftwaffe to order a cessation of cross–Channel operations. Ju 87 units carried out attacks on Channel convoys until early 1941. In December 1940 it was earmarked for Operation Felix, the aborted invasion of Gibraltar through Spain.

StG 3 were possibly scouting for targets on 7 October as a reconnaissance Dornier Do 17 from Stab./StG 3 crash landed to unknown causes. On 7 November 1940 first group flew dive bombing operations against shipping in the Thames Estuary. They claimed one sunk and one damaged for one damaged Ju 87. Leutnant Eberhard Morgenroth's Ju 87 from I./StG 3 was damaged by RAF aircraft. Another attack on 8 November cost it two Ju 87s shot down. Unteroffizier Friedrich Imspring's 'S7 + ML' of 3/StG 3 failed to return, as did 'S7 + EL' of 3 Staffel piloted by Leutnant Walter Kummer. A third Ju 87 from 1./StG 3 ran out of fuel and crash landed at Dunkirk.

=== Malta and Mediterranean ===
In December 1940 StG 3 was ordered to Trapani in Sicily. From 2–9 January 1941 it moved to airstrips on the island with only a brief pause near Stuttgart to allow for leave and rest. Stab./StG 3 was enlarged by two groups. I./StG 1 and II./StG 2 were subordinated to it. The collection of units were assigned to X Fliegerkorps. The wing's command was ordered to carry out attacks against Malta, the Mediterranean Fleet, and destroy shipping sailing between Sicily and North Africa, to support their Italian ally fighting in Libya. The wing was ordered to engage and destroy the British aircraft carrier, HMS Illustrious. The carrier had played an important role in the Battle of Taranto and became a priority target. On 7 February Georg Edert was replaced as Geschwaderkommodore. His successor Karl Christ, StG 3, ordered an attack.

The crews thought four direct hits would sink the ship and began practice operations on floating mock-ups. The vast flight deck offered a target of 6,500 square metres. Operation Excess began a series of convoy operations by the British across the Mediterranean Sea. On 10 January they were within range of the Ju 87 bases. II./StG 2 sent 43 Ju 87s with support from I./StG 1. Witnessed by Andrew Cunningham, C-in-C of the Fleet from the battleship HMS Warspite, the Ju 87s scored six hits. One destroyed a gun, another hit near her bow, a third demolished another gun, while two hit the lift, wrecking the aircraft below deck, causing explosions of fuel and ammunition. Another went through the armoured deck and exploded deep inside the ship. Two further attacks were made without result. Badly damaged, but with her main engines still intact, she steered for . The attack lasted six minutes; killed 126 crew members and wounded 91. Further damage was inflicted upon the carrier, but the Ju 87s failed to destroy her. However, on 11 January 1941, 10 more Ju 87s from Christ's command were sent to sink Illustrious. They chanced upon the light cruisers HMS Southampton and Gloucester. Hits were scored on both; Southampton was so badly damaged her navy escorts scuttled her.

On 28 February 1941, Stab./StG 3 transferred to Fliegerführer Afrika (Air Leader Africa) in response to Hitler's decision to established the Deutsches Afrikakorps (German Africa Corps) on 20 January with General Erwin Rommel commanding.

III./StG 3 was formed on 13 January 1942 under the command of Walter Enneccerus at San Pancrazio in Italy. On 1 March 1942 it reported 29 Ju 87D-1s, a tropicalised version. Under the command of II Fliegerkorps it flew daily air attacks against Malta from 24 March. Typically two to three missions per day of 15 to 30 aircraft in each attack. The dive bombers were ordered to bomb harbours or airfields. On 27 March at least 30 Ju88s, 25 Ju87s of III./StG 3 and 13 Bf 109s of II/JG 3 were reported over the Island. The Ju87s attacked the cargo ship Breconshire but failed to achieve a direct hit. The ship was wrecked and sunk though its cargo was salvaged.

On 1 April 1942 they sank British submarines P36, and Pandora. A mine sweeper was also sunk and three other ships damaged. On 9 April the destroyers Gallant and Lance were sunk. Two days later Kingston was severely damaged. The cost of these operations, to 13 May, was 17 Ju 87s, four on 10 May alone. The majority of the losses were in combat with RAF fighters. Over 21–24 May the group replaced the losses and moved to Derna, Libya. The successes against British naval units cost it half of its pre-operation strength. The group carried a last bombing raid on 13 May against RAF Hal Far.

I./StG 3 returned to Sicily for operations briefly on 12 August 1942. Based at Trapani it served Fliegerkorps II and flew bombing attacks on the Pedestal convoy. The Ju 87s scored two hits on the aircraft carrier Indomitable forcing her out of action. The Germans lost two crews to her fighters. The motor vessel Dorset was also sunk. It flew more attacks on the 13 and 14 August and lost one aircraft. The cruiser Kenya was damaged. The group returned to Egypt in late August 1942.

=== Yugoslavia, Greece, Crete ===
Stab./StG 3 with the assigned groups, moved to Libya, possibly near Bir Dufan southeast of Tripoli on 12 February. The command unit was operating in the Sirte area by late March. It was ordered to Austria at the end of that month. Wing Commander Karl Christ was given command of an ad hoc unit named "Fliegerführer Graz". Under this command, were II./JG 54, equipped with Messerschmitt Bf 109s, II./StG 77, with Ju 87s, and I./JG 27 with more Bf 109s. Stab./StG 3 had only three aircraft, but the command, now attached to Luftflotte 4, supported the German invasion of Yugoslavia. After the rapid capitulation of the country, it supported the advance to Athens, via Larissa and Corinth. By the end of the Battle of Greece, it was based at Argos.

I./StG 3 supported the invasion from bases in Belitsa, Bulgaria. The group was attached to VIII Fliegerkorps under Wolfram Freiherr von Richthofen. It mustered 39 Ju 87s and supported the spearheads in northern Greece. The group bombed British forces near Servia losing two aircraft.

During the Allied evacuation of Greece, Operation Demon, the Ju 87s sank scores of Allied ships. From 22 to 24 April 23 vessels were sunk by Ju 87s at Piraeus naval base. A photograph from I./StG 3 reconnaissance aircraft shows the aftermath of attacks against Allied evacuation points at Megara. The photograph shows a burning 4,000-ton tanker. It has been claimed Ju 87s formed part of a strike-group against shipping which caused the Slamat disaster. StG units purportedly sank the Dutch troopship Slamat. Costa Rica (8,085 tons), Santa Clara (13,320 tons) and Ulster Prince (3,800 tons) were also sunk, with heavy loss of life. Stab./StG 3 moved to Athens–Tatoi and Molaoi in preparation for the Battle of Crete.

The invasion of Crete began on 20 May 1941. StG 3 lost three Ju 87s in a take off accident at Argos on 22 May. Ju 87 units inflicted substantial losses on the Royal Navy, though StG 3 managed only to severely damage HMS Dido and Orion, assisted by StG 77. The damage to the latter ship may have been made by the single Ju 87 lost, which dropped a bomb into the forward gun position before it crashed.

A small number of I./StG 3 units remained on Crete to attack British warships in the eastern Mediterranean without successes. They departed in mid-November 1941.

=== North Africa ===
Stab./StG 3 moved from Greece to Libya between late July and the third week of August 1941. It was based at Derna, near Tobruk. The command unit once again took control of two other groups from different wings, I./StG 1 and II./StG 2. The command was based at Gambut in mid-September. By December they were based Marble Arch.

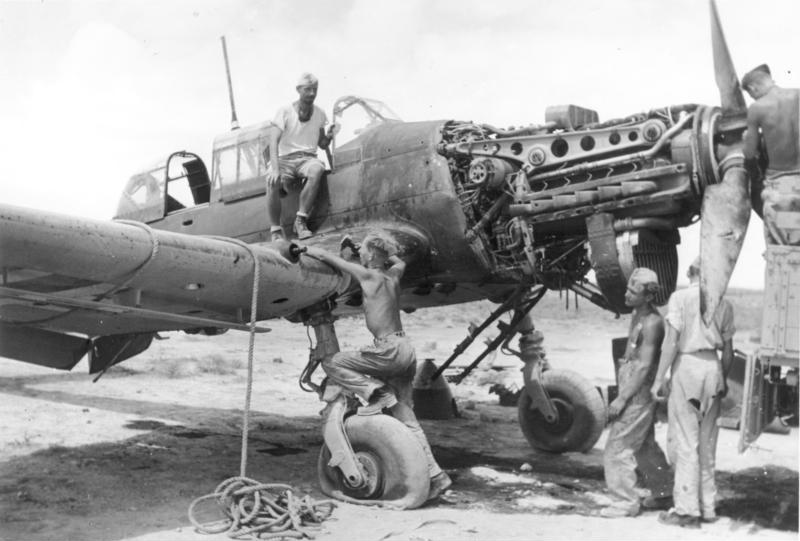
Ju 87 undergoing maintenance (North Africa, 1941)

I./StG 3 soon arrived from Rhodes just as the British began Operation Crusader. The Desert Air Force had parity in fighters and the Ju 87s began to suffer heavy losses. It was apparent that the "writing was on the wall for the Ju 87." On 20 November 1941 six from 12 Ju 87s from I./StG 1 were lost or damaged, while 18 more—most from II./StG 2—were damaged or destroyed on the ground. Three days later Stab./StG 3 aircraft became casualties in this way. On 30 November another 15 week destroyed or damaged and on 4 December another 13 followed. Along with British air superiority, which often prevented the Ju 87s from reaching their target, the open spaces allowed British and Commonwealth forces to disperse, robbing the dive bombers of a huddled mass of targets.

First group supported the DAK in the failed Siege of Tobruk. It lost one Ju 87 on 25 November. The group lost three aircraft and four men missing on 24 January 1942 near Agedabia. By 1 March the group 35 Ju 87Rs. By 20 March the entire group was based at Martuba.

On 12 February 1942 StG 3 attempted an attack on shipping in Tobruk harbour supported by Ju 87s from 209° Squadriglia. The results of the raid are unknown. StG 3 lost two aircraft, both from 3 staffel, and their crews killed and missing. One Italian aircraft was damaged. The gunner of the latter unit claimed a damaged P-40.

The wing was expanded by incorporating I./StG 1 and II./StG 2 becoming II. and III./StG 3 (commanded by Kurt Kuhlmey and Walter Enneccerus). The reorganisation occurred days before Rommel began a counter offensive which drove the British back to Benghazi. StG 3 ranged ahead of the German ground forces disrupting communications and attacking troop columns. Within a short time they were back over Tobruk. Losses rose again. Knight's Cross holder and commander of I./StG 3 Helmut Naumann was wounded on 27 March. I./StG 3 attacked Tobruk harbour on 2 April, losing two aircraft and their crews despite a strong escort from JG 27 Bf 109s. On 11 April they committed 18 aircraft in attacks against motor transport near Sidi Mandur losing one and four damaged.

StG 3 supported the DAK in the Battle of Bir Hakeim and Battle of Gazala. Sigel's airmen flew 1,400 Sorties against Bir Hakeim. I./StG 3 reported 10 or 11 Ju 87s destroyed over Gazala from 26 May to 4 June. On 3 June I./StG 3 lost five destroyed and one damaged. The following day it lost its commander Heinrich Eppen killed by South African Air Force fighters. II./StG 3 lost another aircraft over Bir Hacheim fortress. StG 3 lost five destroyed or damaged on this date—two were certainly destroyed and one severely damaged. Seven men were killed, four wounded with one of the latter captured. Eppen was replaced by Hauptmann Martin Mossdorf on 5 June. StG 3 losses may have been as high as 14 Ju 87 in the first week over Bir Hacheim but the dive bombers were instrumental in the capture of the fort—in the last dive bombing raid 124 Ju 87s were sent against the Allied garrison. In the first week 100 attacks were carried out; on 9 June two waves of 100 Ju 87s dive bombed the fortress.

III./StG 3 reported one or two losses attacking motor transport between Tobruk and El Adem. On 14 June it bombed a convoy without success for the cost of one Ju 87. The following morning they succeeded in disabling the cruiser Birmingham without loss. The cruiser's engine and main armament were damaged.

Tobruk fell on 20 June. Rommel's advance took the DAK to the Qattara Depression, near El Alamein.

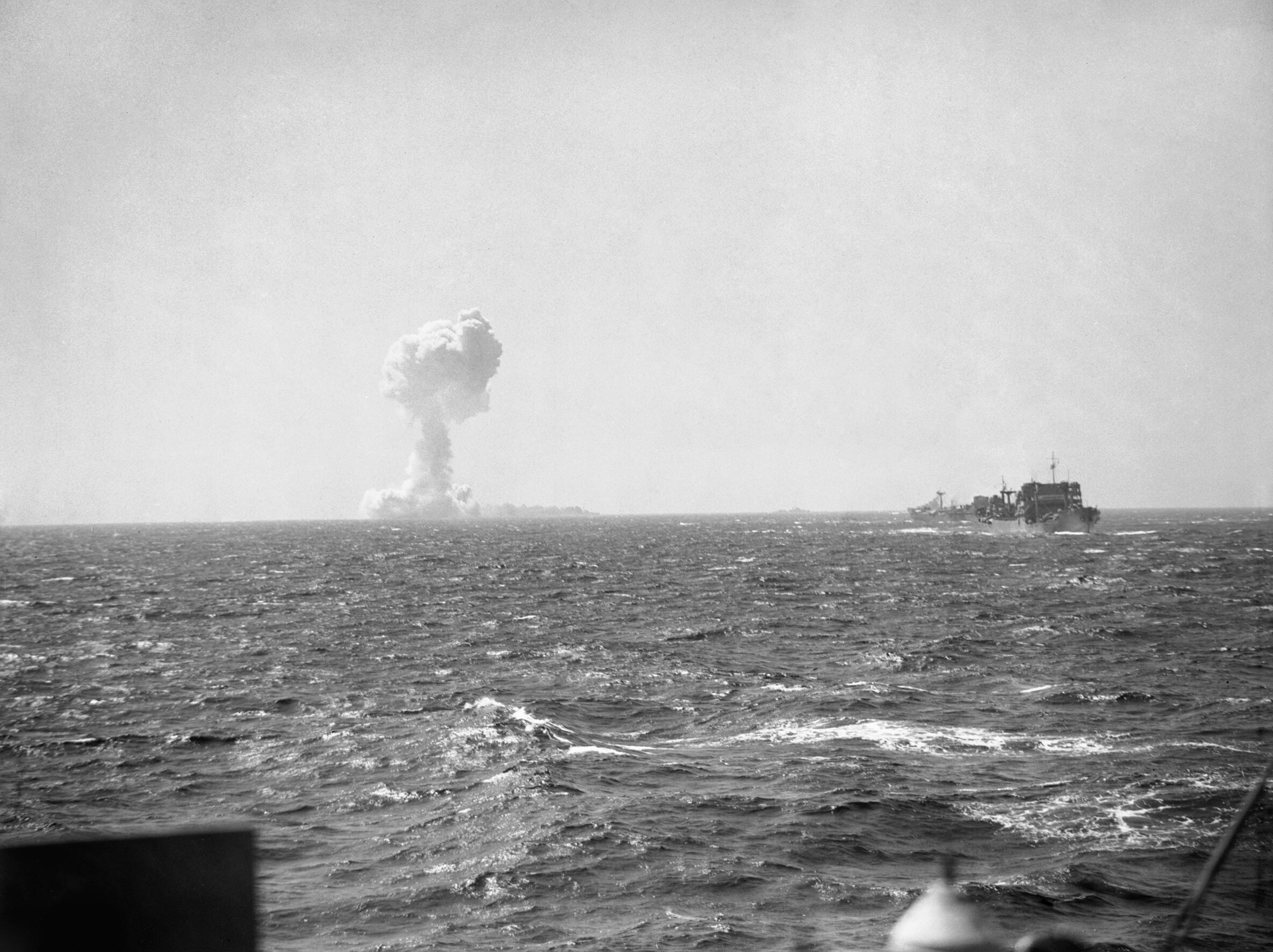
Airdale blowing up after a II./StG 3 attack.

II./StG 3 had only nine Ju 87s on 1 March. On 7 April the group moved to Bari to rest and refit with Ju 87D-1s. On 24 May 1942 it transferred to Derna. Four days later it suffered its first casualties over the front near Tobruk. Staffelkapitän Drescher returned to his unit but the gunner was killed. Two more were lost against the Free French fortress of Bir Hacheim which held out under dice bombing attacks for two weeks until 10 June. Three days they sank a Dutch merchant ship from a Malta–Alexandria convoy (Operation Vigorous) but lost two aircraft. 6 staffel lost commanding officer Anton Ostler. The destroyer Tetcott claimed three of the 40 Ju 87s, but could not stop the destruction of the freighter Aagtekirk. The Flower-class corvette Primula escorting the convoy was also damaged. The destroyer Nestor was crippled in the attacks and had to be scuttled. StG 3 lost one aircraft.

A follow-up attack on 15 June with 35 Ju 87s sank the destroyer Airedale. Operation Harpoon, in mid-June 1942 was contested by StG 3 which sank freighters Burdwan, Chant, and tanker Tanimbar. The convoy turned back to Egypt. The attack, led by Walter Sidel, may have damaged the tanker Kentucky. The group was based at Fuka by 1 July 1942 via El Adem. I. and II./StG 3 joined the group. The wing assisted in the Battle of Mersa Matruh in late June 1942. The battle was the last major success of the DAK against British forces in North Africa.

StG 3 supported Axis forces in the month-long First Battle of El Alamein in July 1942. The German and Italian forces failed to breakthrough to Alexandria. A British wartime report concluded of StG 3 and the Ju 87, that mystique had evaporated;

The Ju 87 was nothing more than a psychological instrument of terror, capable of only local and isolated destruction, ineffective against resolute troops and highly vulnerable to our fighters.

Staffelkapitän of 5./StG 3, Oberleutnant Hans Drescher concluded, "the position of the English at El Alamien could no longer be penetrated." II./StG 3 meanwhile exhibited a lack of activity in July and August 1942 and perhaps was resting and refitting.

On the third day of the battle the first group lost three to enemy aircraft following by a second group aircraft the next day. III./StG 3 had already lost six destroyed or damaged from a formation of 20 to Allied fighters on 26 June. A force of 30 Ju 87s was broken up by DAF fighters on 17 July. At least one loss was recorded in attacks on the group's airfield. The 17 July operation was intercepted by 145 and 73 Squadron and 7 SAAF. The operation failed to achieve anything despite protection from 14 Bf 109s from I./JG 27 and nine from II./JG 27.

By early September 1942 the wing had been equipped with Ju 87Ds. The upgrades had little effect on the Battle of Alam Halfa, which was another failed attempt to break the Allied defences at El Alamein. II./StG 3 lost three Ju 87s on 31 August and another three from a 14–aircraft formation attack positions near Alamein on 3 September.

The wing maintained anti-shipping operations. On 12 September 1942 8./StG 3, of third group, and 1./LG 1 damaged the cruiser Coventry which was scuttled two days later. The destroyer Zulu was sunk alongside it. One source states the destroyer was sunk by Italian aircraft. Other sources credit StG 3. The destroyer's commanding officer testified that his ship was sunk by a combination of six Ju 88 and twelve Ju 87s–III./StG 3 are known to have taken part in the attack. III./StG 3 managed to carry out an attack over the front with 25 aircraft without loss the same day.

On 23 October 1942 the British went onto the offensive beginning the Second Battle of El Alamein. II./StG 3 was ordered to Trapani then Elmas in Sardinia under the command of Fliegerkorps X, to attack shipping in the western Mediterranean on 29 October. The group did not return to Africa until 9 November. Little is recorded about I./StG 3 in October. III./StG 3 supported the DAK and Italian African Army from Alamein. On 1 October it lost two Ju 87s to enemy aircraft and three days into the British offensive lost two crews, including the commanding officer Hauptmann Kurt Walter, Knight's Cross holder, was killed after his parachute failed to deploy.

Four days later, British and Commonwealth forces broke through the Axis line. On 11 November I./StG 3 lost commanding officer Martin Mossdorf, also a Knight's Cross holder, captured. A Staffelkapitän was also lost in the same action. The Stab./StG 3 was sent to refit and rest on 12 November. There is no record of it until April 1943 and its whereabouts are not known. I./StG 3 fought on but was purportedly annihilated in the retreat—on 1 January 1943 it reported no aircraft.

=== Defeat in Tunisia ===
II./StG 3 arrived at Tunis–Aouina on 9 November. It mustered 24 aircraft to oppose Operation Torch, the invasions of Morocco and Algeria. On 14 November the group lost a Staffelkapitän (6 staffel) to fighters and two more Ju 87s in an attack on their airfield. On 16 November they bombed Allied spearheads near Tabarka, west of Bône. On 17 November it sent 15 dive bombers to attack against shipping in Bône harbour. On 20 November it moved to Djedeida. On the 22nd it flew against the RAF airfield at Souk el Arb, with 13 Ju 87s, destroying one aircraft on the ground. Two days later 17 sorties were flown against Allied forces between Béja and Testour.

On the 25 November the U.S. 1st Armored Division overran the airfield, initially destroying four aircraft. Another than 21 aircraft were crushed by tanks or put out of action. The Americans exaggerated the claim to be 30 to 36 aircraft. The group flew 48 sorties against the American forces before they reached the airfield. German losses may have been as low as 15. The Americans suffered only two fatalities. One pilot was wounded in air combat. 18 aircraft have been identified by their factory number and listed as damaged or destroyed by tanks. Another three were destroyed and six damaged to all causes.

By the 29 November group had been replenished and on 2 December 1942 moved to Protville and the Bizerte a week later. It flew attacks against enemy vehicle concentrations around Tebourba losing another Staffelkapitän (6 staffel again). II./StG 3 supported the German DAK at the Battle of Tebourba, from 1–10 December. The unit flew and fought over Medjez el Bab from 10 to 12 December and Djebel el Ahmera, 22–25 December. The group was provided fighter protection on at least on occasion, from II./JG 2.

The Axis won the Run for Tunis, prolonging the North African campaign into 1943, which morphed into the Battle of Tunisia. Throughout the Allied advance in November 1942 StG 3 abandoned inserviceable aircraft. Photographic evidence taken by British Commonwealth personnel show at least five were captured this way. III./StG 3 retreated from Gambut to Marble Arch on 12 November. On 24 November the group was at Nofilia–North on the Gulf of Sirte as Axis forces retreated to Tripoli. The group reported large losses to crashes and relentless RAF pressure. StG 3 was further weakened when I./StG 3 was transferred to the Eastern Front in early 1943 leaving the other two groups in Tunisia. The group had suffered heavy losses—on 11 November 1942 it was virtually destroyed in combat with P–40s, possibly losing 14 from a formation of 15 aircraft. Actual losses appear to have been eight, plus a reconnaissance Do 17 aircraft. II./StG 3 reported 29 Ju 87D-3/Trops on 1 January 1943. III./StG 3 reported only 12 Ju 87D-1/Trop and 9 Ju 87D-3/Trop the same day.

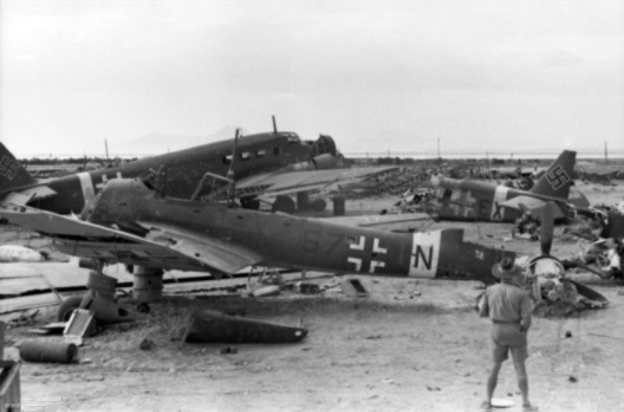
An abandoned StG 3 aircraft in Tunis. A Junkers Ju 52 is in the background, 1943

The latter group was based at Bir Dufan under Fliegerführer Afrika. Within ten days it had lost six of these aircraft—two to combat. II./StG 3 suffered two losses over Bône harbour on 2 January 1943. Supported by III/SKG 10, the unit sank two freighters, damaged four more, and damaged the cruiser Ajax. StG 3 suffered no losses. On 15 January 1943 Tripoli fell. Three days later, Ju 87s supported a 30-strong tank formation which seized the Pont du Fahs but was held at Bou Arada. The force turned to Djebel Mansour, but was defeated by the 1st Parachute Brigade. 14 Ju 87s of II./StG 3 were able to make a daylight attack escorted by 15 Fw 190s. On 21 January III./StG 3 lost three aircraft over Castel Benito in combat with No. 92 Squadron RAF.

The group moved to Gabes on 1 February and on 10 February Zaghouan under Fliegerkorps Tunis. Five days later it was attached to Fliegerführer 2 and limited to 9–12 sorties due to fuel shortages. The group flew in support of the 5th Panzer Army at the Battle of Kasserine Pass. On 14 February it flew day-long operations over Zidi Bou Zid. The following day it attacked the 1st US Armored division without success. The Ju 87s also flew air Support for Operation Ochsenkopf–which ended in defeat for German forces.

When the British Army began the Battle of the Mareth Line in March 1943 the wing was shifted to the east. It was based at Ste-Marie du Zit until 11 April. It fought at the Battle of Wadi Akarit and lost three Ju 87s attacking artillery and armour Oued Zarga on 7 April. The group lost another three Ju 87s to the 20 April. Due to prohibitive losses it was moved to Reggie di Calabria, Italy with 14 remaining aircraft. III./StG 3 operations followed a similar pattern. From late February to March, it operated in the north, near to Sfax. The group was forced to operate in formations of two to three because of Allied air superiority. On 18 April the unit abandoned Tunisia with 18 aircraft for Sardinia. The base came under attack and from 27 to 30 April it returned to Germany having suffered heavy losses.

=== Eastern Front ===
I./StG 3 received Ju 87D-3s in Germany and transferred to Bagerovo, under the command of Fliegerkorps VIII. It began active operations over the Taman Peninsula— known as the Kuban bridgehead. The group suffered the loss of 10 aircraft with another three damaged. It departed the Soviet Union in June 1943, ending its participation on the Eastern Front.

III./StG 3 arrived on the front-lines in June 1943, and remained until October. It was the longest-serving of the wing's combat units in the east. The group was based at Konotop and assigned to Luftflotte 6, and allocated to the 1 Fliegerdivision. The group moved via Bryansk and Orel through June in preparation for Operation Zitadelle (Battle of Kursk). On 5 July it possessed 36 Ju 87D-3s and three D-1s, all of them tropicalised variants. The group was assigned to support the northern pincer containing the 9th Army and 2nd Panzer Army.

On the first day third group flew against artillery in the Malo–Arkhangelsk area. 4./StG 3 proved to be the most fortunate unit over the front, losing one aircraft in July. On 6 July the air division assisted in the repulse of an attack by the Soviet 19th Independent Tank Corps. Soviet after–battle analysis stated air attacks of up to 100 German aircraft. Motorised battalions were cut off from the armour spearheads. The corps was ordered onto the defensive. The 1 Fliegerdivision held the upper hand against the Soviet 16th Air Army overall on 7 July. The Soviets overpowered the German air division in the number of fighters it could send into the battle zone. Air attacks and defensive operations prevented the 9th Army achieving a major breakthrough. To the 15 July only two losses were recorded, one them being 7./StG commanding officer Hauptmann Otto Patschkowski. A major contribution was the high concentration of German fighter forces. Over six days, though exhausted, the 1 Fliegerdivision had dealt the Soviet 16th Air Army a series of heavy defeats.

On 12 July the Red Army began Operation Kutuzov. Against the Bryansk Front the group was most active. One pilot flew six ground attack missions from 06:40 to 19:45. The Ju 87s were protected by Focke-Wulf Fw 190s. Through achieving local air superiority, the ground attack units of the air division claimed 35 tanks, 50 vehicles and 14 artillery pieces. Soviet ground forces managed only to breach the first defence line. In the northern sector, the Soviet Western Front and 1st Air Army was much more successful and threatened the entire left flank of the 2nd Panzer Army. The German command slowly began to recognise their attack was more than a diversion.

On 14 July the 18th Panzer Division was defeated in a tank battle against the 11th Guards Army and the Soviet 5th Tank Corps raced to seize Bolkhov thereby cutting off the German strong point. The German 53rd Armeekorps requested air support. During the course of the air battles III./StG 3's commanding office Gruppenkommandeur Eberhard Jacob was shot down and wounded. By 15 July the Orel bulge was in danger of collapse. The 1 Fliegerdivision, immensely successful until 12 July, now faced the more effective 1st Air Army, which broke the German division's superiority. The air division still played a vital close air support role, instrumental in preventing the enciclement of the two northern German armies. On 17 July the division flew 1,693 sorties followed by 1,100 the following day—449 were Ju 87 missions. The group participated in the division's 1,386 sorties on 22 July. In eighteen days since 5 July the group had flown 69 dive bomber operations. One pilot, Erhard Jähnert, flew in 57. He survived the war, having flown 700 missions and earning the Knight's Cross. The evacuation of Orel bulge was possible since the Luftwaffe had kept open the lines of communication which allowed for a defensive success. The German offensive however, failed.

In August 1943 III./StG 3 fought near Kharkov, Bryansk and in late September near Gomel. It moved to Bagerovo in the Crimea on 2 October. From there it spent the final days of its existence fighting over the Kuban bridgehead on the Taman Peninsula. On 6 October 1943 the group attacked elements of the Black Sea Fleet comprising the Leningrad class destroyers Kharkov, Besposhchadny and Sposobny and sank them. On 18 October it was renamed III./SG 3.

=== Dodecanese campaign ===
In the aftermath of the North African defeat I. and II./StG 3 returned to the Mediterranean Theatre. Both groups spent the remainder of their existence based in occupied Greece. Each of the units began moving into Greek bases in mid-June 1943. I./StG 3 in MEGARA A/F II./StG 3 to Argos A/F. Only third group was absent and remained in action on the Eastern Front. I./StG 3 was engaged in operations against the Greek resistance in July 1943.

I. and II. Gruppe supported German forces in the Battle of Kos and Battle of Leros. I./StG 3 discovered Royal Navy forces evacuating through the Scarpanto Strait. On 7 October 18 Ju 87s dive bombed and damaged HMS Penelope. On 9 October 18 Ju 87s of I./StG 3 dive bombed and damaged HMS CARLISLE at 12.05 hrs C_time. I. Gruppe also accounted for the destroyer Panther during the campaign; sunk by I./StG 3. It supported the suppression of the 33rd Infantry Division Acqui in the islands of Kefalonia and Samos in September 1943. I./StG 3 lost two Ju 87s of the 34 it reported on 1 July in this campaign to naval gunfire. I./StG 3 attacked Carlisle which was damaged; the group is credited with sinking Panther as well. The II. Gruppe StG 3 group lost 14 aircraft; two to a Greek partisan raid at Argos on 5 October. USAAF P-38s shot down a further seven on 9 October 1943 while on a long-range patrol.

I. and II. Gruppe continued to support operations into November 1943 for the battle of Leros. October 18 the wing had been renamed Schlachtgeschwader 3.

== Commanding officers ==
- Oberst Karl Angerstein, July 1940 – 18 July 1940
- Oberstleutnant Georg Edert, 27 July 1940 – 7 February 1941
- Oberstleutnant Karl Christ, 7 February 1941 – 7 March 1942
- Oberstleutnant Walter Sigel, 7 March 1942 – 1 April 1943
- Oberst Kurt Kuhlmey, 1 April 1943 – 18 October 1943

=== I./StG 3 ===
- Major Walter Sigel (9 July 1940 – 1 March 1942)
- Hauptmann Heinrich Eppen (1 March 1942 – 4 June 1942) KIA
- Hauptmann Martin Mossdorf (5 June 1942 – 11 November 1942) POW
- Hauptmann Horst Schiller (1 December 1942 – 2 June 1943) MIA
- Hauptmann Helmut Naumann (19 June 1943 – 18 October 1943)
- Hauptmann Hans Von Bargen (I./SG 3)
