= Schlachtgeschwader 3 =

Luftwaffe close air support unit

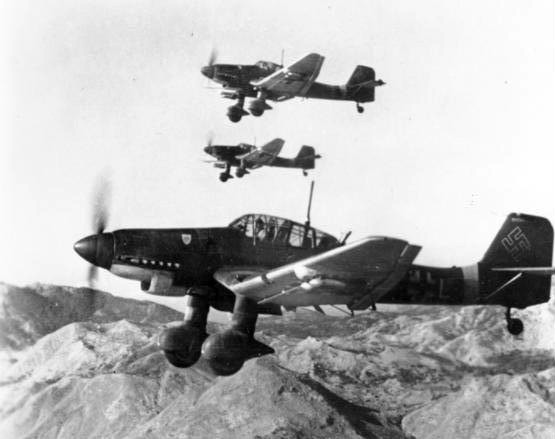
- Junkers Ju 87D dive bombers of SG 3 over Yugoslavia, October 1943
- Active: 1943–45
- Country: Nazi Germany
- Branch: Luftwaffe
- Type: Dive bomber
- Role: Close air support
- Size: Air Force Wing

Insignia
- Identification symbol: S1

Schlachtgeschwader 3 (SG 3) was a Luftwaffe close air support Geschwader during World War II. It was formed on 18 October 1943 in Eleusis from Sturzkampfgeschwader 3. A special detachment was formed 13 June 1944 to 13 August 1944 referred to as Detachment Kuhlmey. The detachment was built around elements of I./SG 3, I./SG 5, II./JG 54 and NaGr.1

== Commanding officers ==
- Oberst Kurt Kuhlmey, 18 October 1943 – 15 December 1944
- Major Bernhard Hamester, 15 December 1944 – 28 April 1945

== See also ==
Organization of the Luftwaffe during World War II

== Bibliography ==
- Bergström, Christer (2008). Bagration to Berlin - The Final Air Battles in the East: 1944 - 1945. London: Ian Allan. ISBN 978-1-903223-91-8.
- Brütting, Georg (1992) [1976]. Das waren die deutschen Stuka-Asse 1939 – 1945 [These were the German Stuka Aces 1939 – 1945] (in German) (7th ed.). Stuttgart, Germany: Motorbuch. ISBN 978-3-87943-433-6.
- de Zeng, Henry L., IV; Stankey, Douglas G. (2013). Dive-Bomber and Ground-Attack Units of the Luftwaffe 1933-1945. Vol. 2. Hersham, UK: Classic Publications. ISBN 978-1-906537-09-8.
- Hooton, E.R. (1999). Eagle in Flames: Defeat of the Luftwaffe. Weidenfeld & Nicolson. ISBN 978-1-85409-343-1.
- Muller, Richard (1992). The German Air War in Russia, 1941-1945. Baltimore: The Nautical & Aviation Publishing Company of America. ISBN 1-877853-13-5.
- Smith, Peter (2011). The Junkers Ju 87 Stuka: A Complete History. London, UK: Crecy Publishing Limited. ISBN 978-0-85979-156-4.
- Weal, John (1998). Junkers Ju 87 Stukageschwader of North Africa and the Mediterranean. Oxford, UK: Osprey Publishing. ISBN 978-1-85532-722-1.
