= Immola Airfield =

Immola Airfield Immolan lentokenttä
- IATA: none; ICAO: EFIM

Summary
- Operator: Imatran Lentokentän Kannatusyhdistys ry
- Location: Imatra, Finland
- Elevation AMSL: 338 ft / 103 m
- Coordinates: 61°14′59″N 028°54′13″E

Map
- Location within Finland

Runways
Direction	Length		Surface
Direction	m	ft	Surface
01/19	1,090	3,576	Asphalt/gravel
09/27	800	2,625	Gravel
- Source: VFR Finland

Immola Airfield (ICAO: EFIM) is an airfield in Imatra, Finland, about 9 kilometres (6 mi) northeast of Imatrankoski, the centre of Imatra.

== History ==
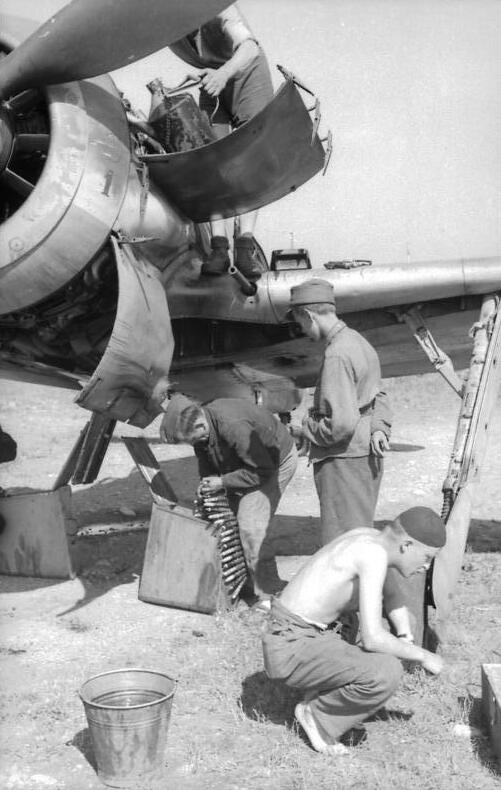
A Focke-Wulff 190A-6, belonging to 4./JG 54 of Gefechtsverband Kuhlmey in Immola, summer 1944

Planning of the airfield began in 1933, and the airfield was opened in 1936. Before and during the Second World War, the airfield served as a base of the Finnish Air Force. The German leader (Führer) Adolf Hitler visited Immola on June 4, 1942 to congratulate C. G. E. Mannerheim, the Marshal of Finland, on his 75th birthday. In the summer of 1944, the Detachment Kuhlmey operated mainly from Immola.

== See also ==
- List of airports in Finland
