= Karl Angerstein =

German general

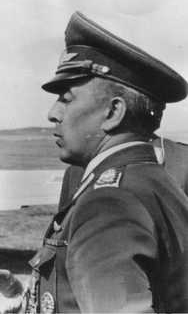
- Born: 4 December 1890
- Died: 20 September 1985 (aged 94)
- Military career
- Allegiance: German Empire; Weimar Republic; Nazi Germany
- Branch: Luftwaffe
- Rank: Generalleutnant
- Commands: Sturzkampfgeschwader 3 Kampfgeschwader 1; 1st Air Corp
- Conflicts: World War II
- Awards: Knight's Cross of the Iron Cross

Karl Angerstein (4 December 1890 – 20 September 1985) was a German general during World War II who commanded the 1st Air Corps. He was a recipient of the Knight's Cross of the Iron Cross of Nazi Germany.

== Awards ==
- German Cross in Gold on 16 July 1942 as Generalmajor in Kampfgeschwader 1
- Knight's Cross of the Iron Cross on 2 November 1940 as Oberst and Geschwaderkommodore of Kampfgeschwader 1 "Hindenburg"

Military offices
Preceded by none	Commander of Sturzkampfgeschwader 3 July 1940 – 18 July 1940	Succeeded by Oberstleutnant Georg Edert
Preceded by Oberst Josef Kammhuber	Commander of Kampfgeschwader 1; 18 July 1940 – 1 March 1942	Succeeded by Major Herbert Loch
Preceded by Generalleutnant Alfred Mahnke	Commander of I. Fliegerkorps; 26 June 1943 – 6 November 1943	Succeeded by General der Flieger Paul Deichmann
