= Punta Almina Lighthouse =

Lighthouse in the autonomous city of Ceuta, Spain

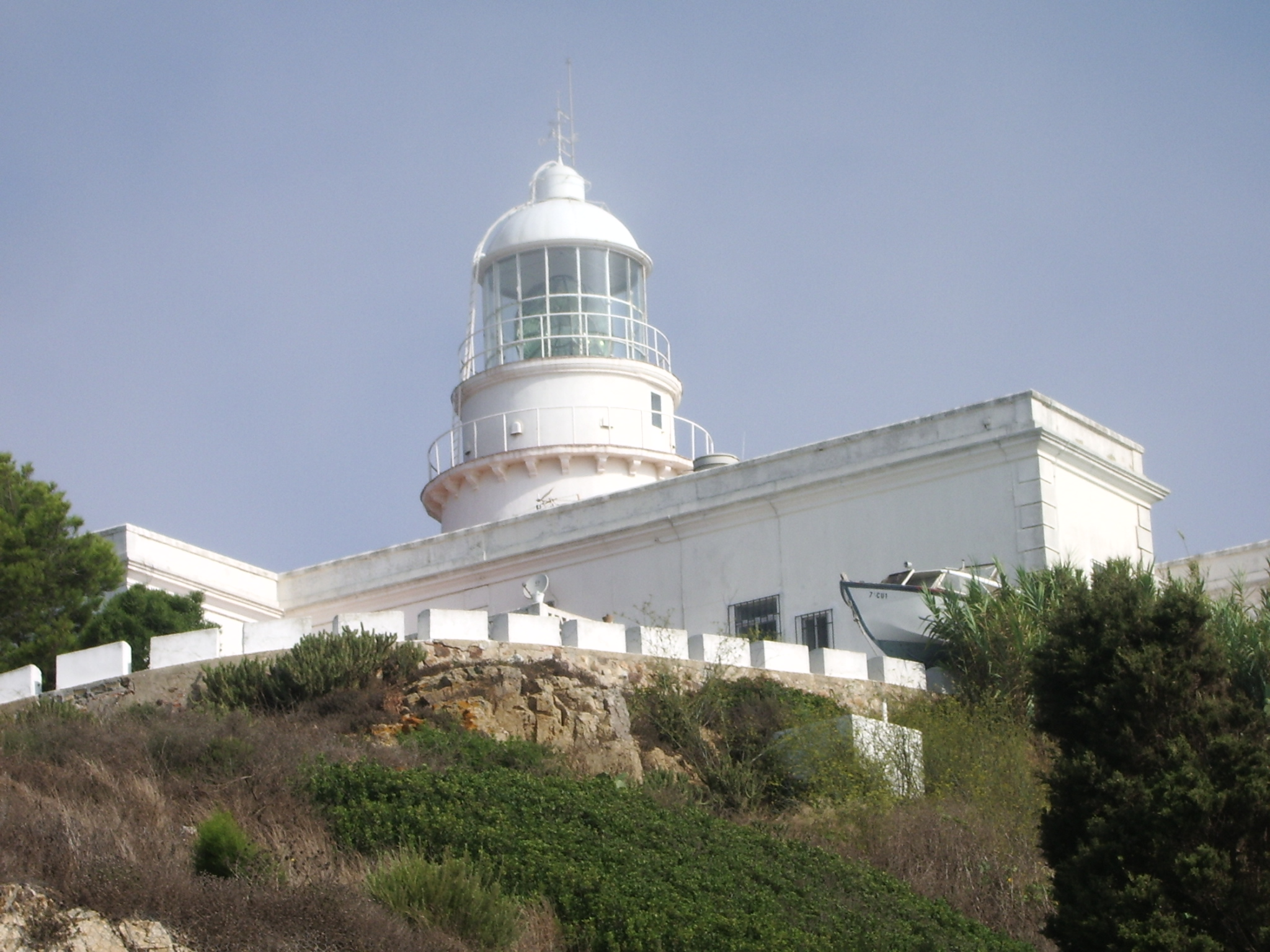
- Location: Ceuta, Spain
- Coordinates: 35°53′54″N 05°16′50″W

Tower
- Constructed: 1851
- Automated: 1855
- Height: 16 metres (52 ft)

Light
- Focal height: 148 metres (486 ft)
- Lens: second order Fresnel lens
- Range: 22 miles (35 km)
- Characteristic: Oc (2) WRG 8s.

The Punta Almina Lighthouse (Spanish: Faro de Punta Almina) is a lighthouse in the Peninsula of Almina of the autonomous city of Ceuta, Spain.

== History ==
It was designed by Juan Martínez de la Villa in 1851, at a cost of 462,000 reales, which were partly borne by the Dukes of Montpensier (Infanta Luisa Fernanda and Antoine d'Orléans), promoters of the work that was inaugurated on 1 December 1855. The building is made of masonry and the white cylindrical tower. The optics is of fast turn on mercury float, of the house Henry Lepaute, that is the one that at the moment is in service. The focal height is located at 145.17 m above sea level, with a range of 22 nautical miles.
