= Operational history of the Savoia-Marchetti SM.81 =

Savoia-Marchetti SM.81
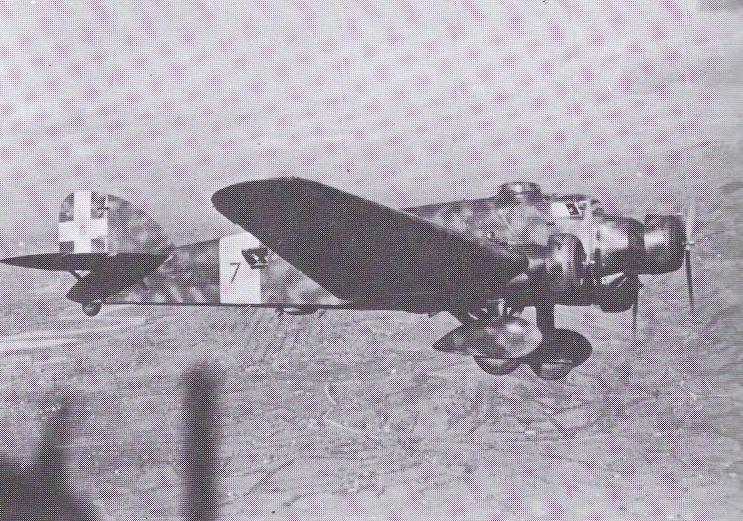
- A Savoia-Marchetti S.M. 81 in flight in the early 1940s. Note the fixed undercarriage

General information
- Type: Bomber and transport aircraft
- Manufacturer: Savoia-Marchetti
- Primary users: Regia Aeronautica Spanish Air Force; Aeronautica Militare
- Number built: 534

History
- Introduction date: 1935
- First flight: 1934
- Retired: 1950
- Developed from: Savoia-Marchetti S.73

The Savoia-Marchetti SM.81 first saw combat during the Second Italo-Abyssinian War, where it showed itself to be versatile, serving as a bomber, transport and reconnaissance aircraft. SM.81s also fought in the Spanish Civil War with the Aviazione Legionaria and were among the first aircraft sent by the fascist powers to aid Francisco Franco.

In spite of their obsolescence, when Italy became involved in the Second World War, approximately 300 SM.81s were in service with the Regia Aeronautica. Its low speed and vulnerability to fighter aircraft meant that daytime duties were second line, with the aircraft being used primarily as a transport. At night, the SM.81 was an effective bomber, particularly in the North African theatre.

Most SM.81s were withdrawn from use by the time of the Italian armistice of 1943, although some remained in service of both the Italian Social Republic and the Italian Co-Belligerent Air Force.

Several examples survived the war and went on to serve the Aeronautica Militare Italiana, but by 1950 they had all been retired.

== Early history ==
The first 100 aircraft were delivered to 7, 9, 13 and 15 Wings, serving initially in Ethiopia where they proved to be well suited. They were quickly adapted to the roles of bombing, strafing, close air support and reconnaissance. This was an aggressive war against Italy's old adversary that in 1896 had defeated the Italian expedition corps at Adwa, and despite international conventions, both the Italians and Abyssinians committed many war crimes, including the use of chemical weapons, with SM.81s deploying Phosgene and Yperite against enemy troops. A total of 170 bombers — Caproni Ca.133s and SM.81s — operated in the Ethiopian war in the two groups of 9 Wing, which was a cloned unit ("bis") of the original 9° that remained in Italy.

After entering Addis Ababa in 1936, the Italians continued to face fierce opposition for many months. The situation only became stable in 1937 by virtue of Italian air supremacy and support, which was decisive against an extremely dangerous enemy in this difficult and wild terrain. 36 SM.81s remained in Ethiopia to provide support to Italian troops occupying the country, including transport and the airlifting of supplies. Small arms fire was the main danger, as the missions were flown at low altitude, but the damage was normally insufficient to bring down the aircraft, even though they had no protective armour apart from having self-sealing fuel tanks.

SM.81s also initially operated with 8 Wing (Bologna), 10 (Bresso), 11 (Ferrara), 12 (Guidonia), 14 and 16 (Vicenza), 30, 32 and 33 Wings (Napoli); they also equipped 15° in Libya, where they were fitted with Gnome-Rhône 14K engines and anti-sand filters.

== Spanish Civil War ==
The main career of the SM.81 started on 28 July 1936. On a mission dedicated to supporting General Francisco Franco and his "alzamiento" (uprising) against the Republican government at the start of the Spanish Civil War; 12 SM.81s under the guise of Spanish civilian ownership took off from Elmas, near Cagliari, to fly to Morocco carrying 63 non-uniformed troops led by Colonel Ivanoe Bonomi. The anticipated ferry flight was around 1,135 km (705 mi), but several problems occurred en route.

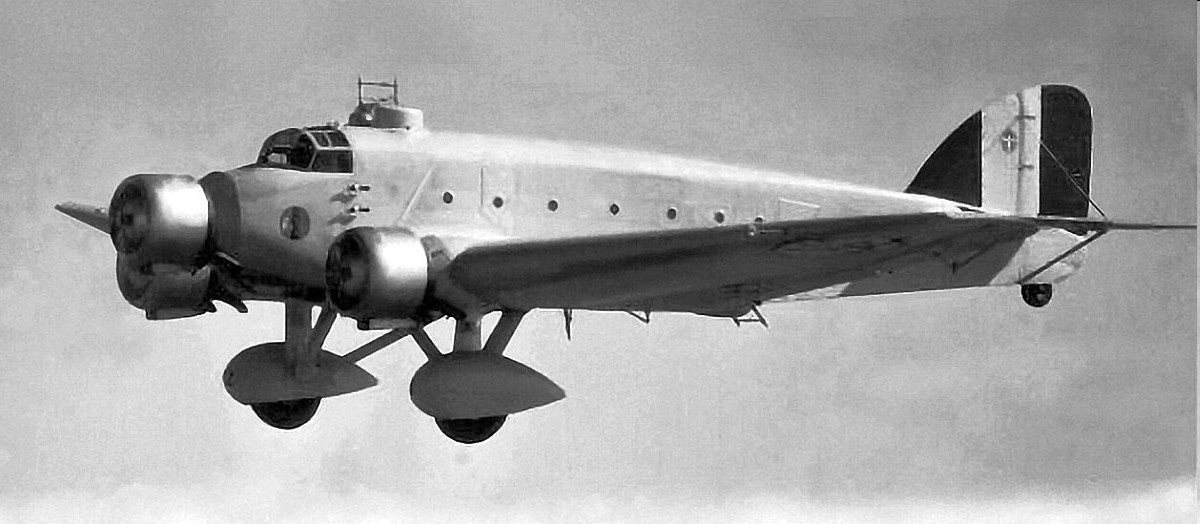
A Savoia Marchetti SM.81 in action during the Spanish Civil War (escorted by Fiat CR.32 fighters)

The journey should have been flown in less than four and a half hours at 260–270 km/h (160-170 mph), but on encountering strong headwinds at 1,000 m (3,280 ft) they climbed to 3,500 m (11,480 ft). the best cruise altitude for the Alfa Romeo 125 engines. After five hours they were still an hour from their final destination of Melilla in Morocco. Trying to maintain tight formation despite the clouds was also fuel-costly, with non-linear flight, only nine aircraft managed to land at Melilla. One ditched in the sea, another crash-landed and a third force-landed without damage in Algeria. The remaining aircraft arrived with an average of only 130 L (34 US gal) of fuel remaining in the tanks, the most being the 200 L (53 US gal) left. This aircraft was sent to search for the missing SM.81s. Being only 3% of the total fuel capacity, this was enough for just a few minutes of flight and meant that, with only a slightly stronger headwind, all of them would have been lost or forced to land in Algeria. The surviving aircraft were valuable assets and soon put to use as troop-transports and bombers.

Franco's Spanish Army of Africa troops were fundamental to raising the fortunes of the alzamiento which had hitherto been mainly beaten by the Republican loyalists. On 6 August 1936, African troops were transported to Spain aboard four merchant ships. The threat of the SM.81s and their bombs, once reinforced by the Italian ship RM Morandini, were sufficient to keep the mainly Republican Spanish fleet at bay, which otherwise would have been able to prevent any Francoist convoy reaching Spain. On 9 August, SM.81s under the command of Ettore Muti, destroyed the Spanish Navy's fuel and ammunition reserves in the vicinity, forcing the fleet to use northern bases and further preventing interference with the sea-transport of Hispano-Moroccan forces.

After these exploits, the initial SM.81s were reinforced by aircraft from four other squadrons: 213, 214, 215 and 216 in two Groups (XXXIV and XXXV), and by 251 and 252 squadrons for the XXV ("Pipistrelli") Group. Throughout the war, SM.81s were used as attack aircraft as well as in the transport role and as bombers. Although some missions were flown with Fiat CR.32 fighter escorts, unescorted day missions were only made possible by flying in tight formation with mutual machine gun protection, and by the aircraft's ability to fly on instruments while in cloud. Sorties were increasingly flown at night after the arrival of Polikarpov I-15 and I-16s in Spain, at which point only seven of the original nine aircraft were still serviceable, having released 210 tonnes (230 tons) of bombs and contributed (together with Junkers Ju 52s) to 868 flights transporting Morocco's troops. After thousands of hours flown by 90 to 100 aircraft, at least 64 surviving SM.81s were left behind in Spain in the G-12 Group at the end of 1938. One example was lost near the end of the war in 1939 along with the lives of many senior officers. The precise total number of SM.81 losses during the war in combat and from operational causes is not known.

== Further developments ==
Even if this aircraft was used for many tasks and by many units, the modest speed of the S.81 soon led to it being replaced by the SM.79 for many applications. One of the later SM.81 models developed had two Isotta Fraschini Asso inline liquid cooled engines with 626 kW (840 hp). But its performance was quite disappointing, including 330 km/h (210 mph) maximum speed, so the modifications were not successful.

Another version was a tanker aircraft (for fuel transport, not air-to-air refuelling).

A command version was built with powerful radio equipment.

The VIP version was used in some numbers. Mussolini had one that he piloted personally. It was called the 'Turtle', a reference to its slow speed. Another nickname of the SM.81 was "Lumache" (snail). But the wide fuselage was more comfortable than the 'fast bombers' like the Sparviero. An innovative feature was the new Caproni-Lanciani turret, armed with a 12.7 mm (.5 in) heavy machine gun. This was considered better than two 7.7 mm (0.303 in), although the Scotti machine gun proved to be unreliable.

Another experimental example was an aircraft for dealing with magnetic mines: it was called the Saturno because it had a large electrified steel ring to trigger the mines. The weight of the gear was initially too high so the ring was changed to one made of aluminium.

Another task for the SM.81 was as a torpedo bomber. Experiments with up to two torpedoes were carried out in 1936. But even with only one on board, the aircraft was too slow, so this task was better suited to the SM.79.

The main task for this aircraft was as a transport. The SM.81T design was produced in 1941, fitted with a Caproni-Lanciani turret and AR 126 engines. More were produced in 1942, in spite of the availability of the larger SM.82. S.81s were almost as fast as the C-47, and had a defensive weapon set, while the range and payload was almost equal, with only a slight inferiority on installed power and speed.

== The late 1930s and World War II ==
The SM.81 was one of the most ubiquitous multi-engine aircraft of the Regia Aereonautica in the second half of the 1930s. It was a pleasant and reliable aircraft to fly, even if it was too slow and not as manoeuvrable as the SM.79. The aircraft made a good impression in pre-war exercises, flying in three-aircraft formations. Several complex manoeuvres were performed, but the reality, in spite of the propaganda of the regime, was that the Regia lagged behind in training and tactics, in spite of a small core of very experienced aircrew.

With Albania's occupation, the SM.81 was used by 37 and 39 Wings as a transport aircraft over the Adriatic Sea, quickly taking soldiers to Albania in a much publicized operation that showed the 'efficiency' of the Italian armed forces. In Libya, in 1938, a whole parachute battalion was lifted when the King went on an official visit to Italo Balbo's colony.

Production of the SM 81 at this point was: SIAI, 237; Piaggio, 60; Macchi, 76; CRDA, 36; Breda, 36; CMSA, 58; AerUmbra, 20; and Caproni, eight. Total, 530 (plus one twin-engine example, the SIAI).

When World War II began, the Regia still had approximately 300 machines on charge, with 37 Wing at Lecce and 40 Group of 38 Wing. The other 38 Wing group, 39°, was in Albania. The Egeum Aereonautic, a small and almost independent military entity of the RA, had 39 Wing, Libya had 14 and 15 Wings and five Groups in Ethiopia were present with this aircraft in strength.

SM.81s fought initially with anti-ship attacks and missions over Alexandria. 37, 38 and 39 Wings fought at Punta Stilo, others saw modest success at the battle of Capo Spada. Alexandria was attacked for the first time on 7 July, with 11 machines. These long-range missions were repeated on 16 and 25 July, 26 August, 8 and 21 September and 5 October. All these missions, especially those against ships, were only modestly successful.

Greece was attacked in the fall, with the use of 37 Wings at Valona and 39 at Lecce.

There were 59 SM.81s In eastern Africa, every group had around a squadron of aircraft. Despite the presence of the more modern SM.79, the SM.81 was the main Italian bomber. The first Italian aircraft to see action in East Africa were a pair of SM.81s. On 11 June 1940, one of them attacked Port Sudan, the other carried out a reconnaissance flight over the Red Sea. That same night, three SM.81s took off to bomb Aden, but one turned back, one of the other two hit a hill near Massawa while trying to land. When Gloster Gladiators and Hawker Hurricanes made the things difficult, the SM.81 was used less and less. Initially only 43 of the 59 aircraft were operational. They were involved in several bombing sorties, generally at night. SM.81s were used to bomb a major British convoy without suffering any losses, but many aircraft were damaged. On 13 June, four bombers were sent to Aden, the main British base, two of them were shot down. In 30 days, nine aircraft were shot down, 10 were destroyed on the ground, and 18 were badly damaged - two-thirds of the total; there were no replacements. On 10 February, there were only 10 serviceable aircraft, only three remained in March.

An SM.81 with an A.130/AR.8 long-range radio landed at Kirkuk in the spring of 1941. It was the command aircraft for the expedition made by Italian forces (together with the Germans), to help the 1941 Iraqi rising. But the Iraqis were already defeated by the British, so the Axis mission failed. Of the 12 Fiat CR.42s of the "Squadriglia Irak", only seven returned.

In North Africa and Italy, SM.81s were used more and more as night bombers, no longer assigned to anti-ship and day-light bombing after the first year of war. 145 Group delivered as of the end of January 1941: 11,600 men and 1,140 tonnes (1,260 tons) of various materials, in 3,200 flying hours.

For Operation Herkules, the invasion of Malta, SM.81s of 18 Wing were to have moved an assault division to Malta, but in the end they were used to transport the Folgore division to El Alamein. After that battle, SM.81s were used to supply the North African forces with reinforcements and stores and to evacuate Tunisia, with 18 Wing alone transporting 28,000 men. In Pantelleria and Lampedusa, SM.81s were the only Italian air cargo aircraft capable of operating due to the short runways.

SM.81s were used only for second-line tasks like troop and materials transport after the first year of the war. Many were marked with the red cross and evacuated wounded. Almost all the first-line Groups had SM.81s or other aircraft in their squadrons for use as support aircraft and transport, with one SM.81 often present in every squadron. SM.81s with their fixed and robust undercarriage were able to operate from every type of terrain, despite the lack of slats, unlike the SM.79s.

Many SM.81s and SM.73s were in Russia during the Battle of Stalingrad. These aircraft tried to help the trapped troops when the Soviets began the Stalingrad offensive, all these machines were lost in that battle.

In September 1943, there were still numerous SM.81s in Italy. Many of them were organized in the south into bomber and transport groups, some flew sorties in the Balkan territories. Eventually the lack of spare parts stopped SM.81 operations. There were some 60 aircraft in northern Italy, 36 of which were still serviceable.

The Transport Group Terracciano, commanded by Maggiore Egidio Pellizzari, was formed in Bergamo and transferred to Goslar, in Lower Saxony, Germany, in January 1944. Here 44 SM.81s were waiting for Italian pilots. The aircraft, in bad condition, were restored to an operational state by their future crews. Administratively the Italians were subordinated to the ANR but operationally to the Luftwaffe under the German designation of "Transport Gruppe Italien 10". On 8 April, the first squadron equipped with 12 SM.81s, was deployed to Šiauliai in Lithuania, followed by the Savoia-Marchetti from the 2nd and 3rd squadrons. The Terracciano operated over the Baltic States, Russia and Finland, evacuating wounded soldiers and carrying fresh troops to the front. On 16 June 19 SM.81s landed in Immola, Finland, bringing from Estonia the technical personnel of the German combat task force Gefechtsverband Kuhlmey sent to strengthen the fighter force in Finland. When the Soviets broke through to Jelgava, in Latvia, in July 1944, the "Transport Gruppe Italien 10" still had 32 serviceable Pipistrelli but there was a shortage of fuel and the Germans were less interested in Italian transport. Thus, after six months of heavy employment the surviving aircraft, some of which were badly damaged, were phased out. None of this group of SM.81s survived the war, as the last four were destroyed when hostilities ended.
