= La Almina Peninsula =

Peninsula in Ceuta, Spain

Coordinates: 35.890°N 5.302°W

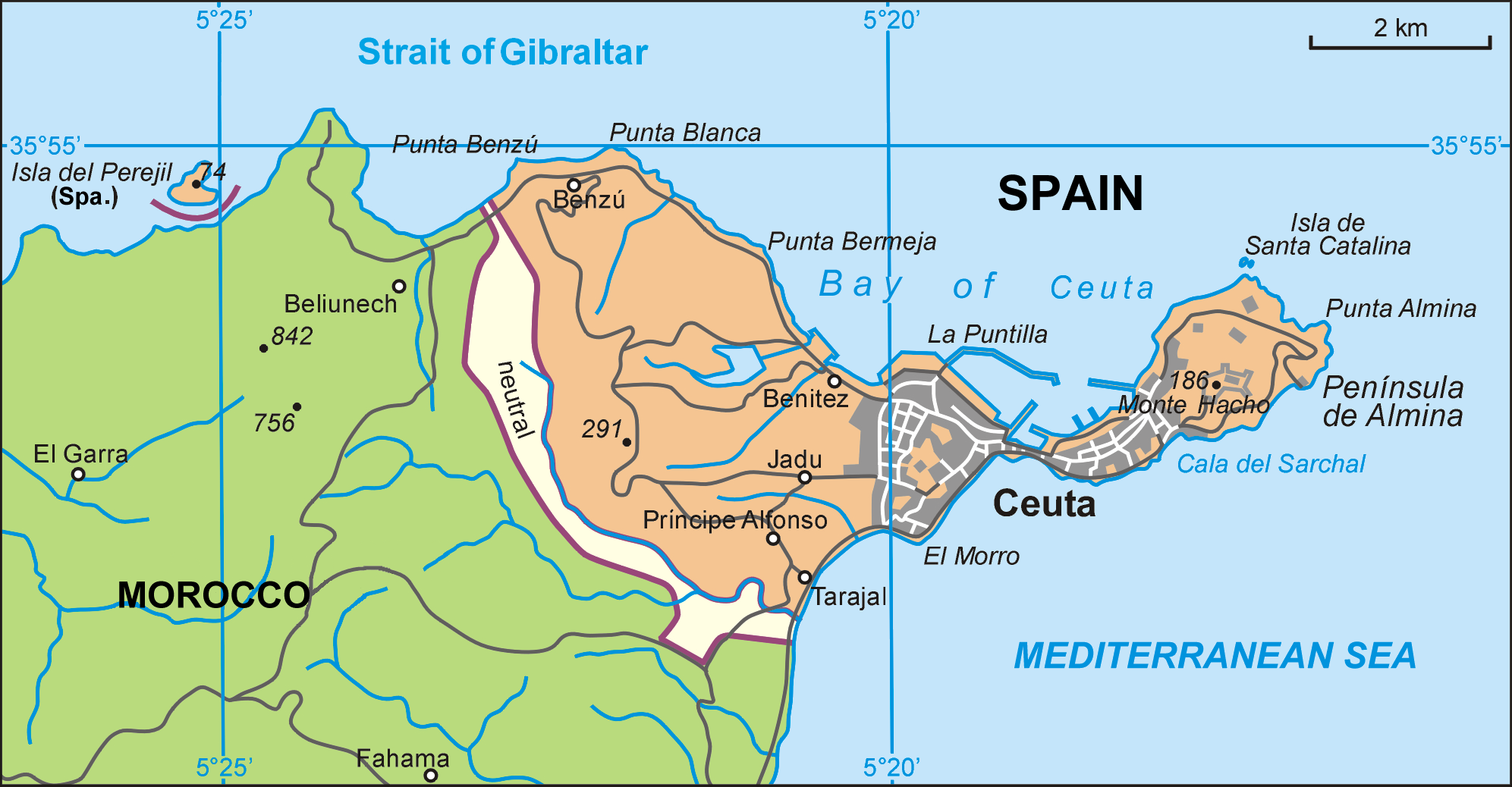
Ceuta and the La Almina Peninsula.

The La Almina Peninsula (Spanish: Península de La Almina) is a peninsula making up the majority of the eastern part of the Spanish city of Ceuta in the Maghreb. It is dominated by the peak of Monte Hacho. The peninsula contains Ceuta's easternmost point, Punta Almina, and is connected to the rest of Ceuta by an isthmus barely 100 metres (330 ft) in width.

The small Isla de Santa Catalina lies off the peninsula's north coast.
