= Tingitan Peninsula =

Small peninsula in northwest Africa

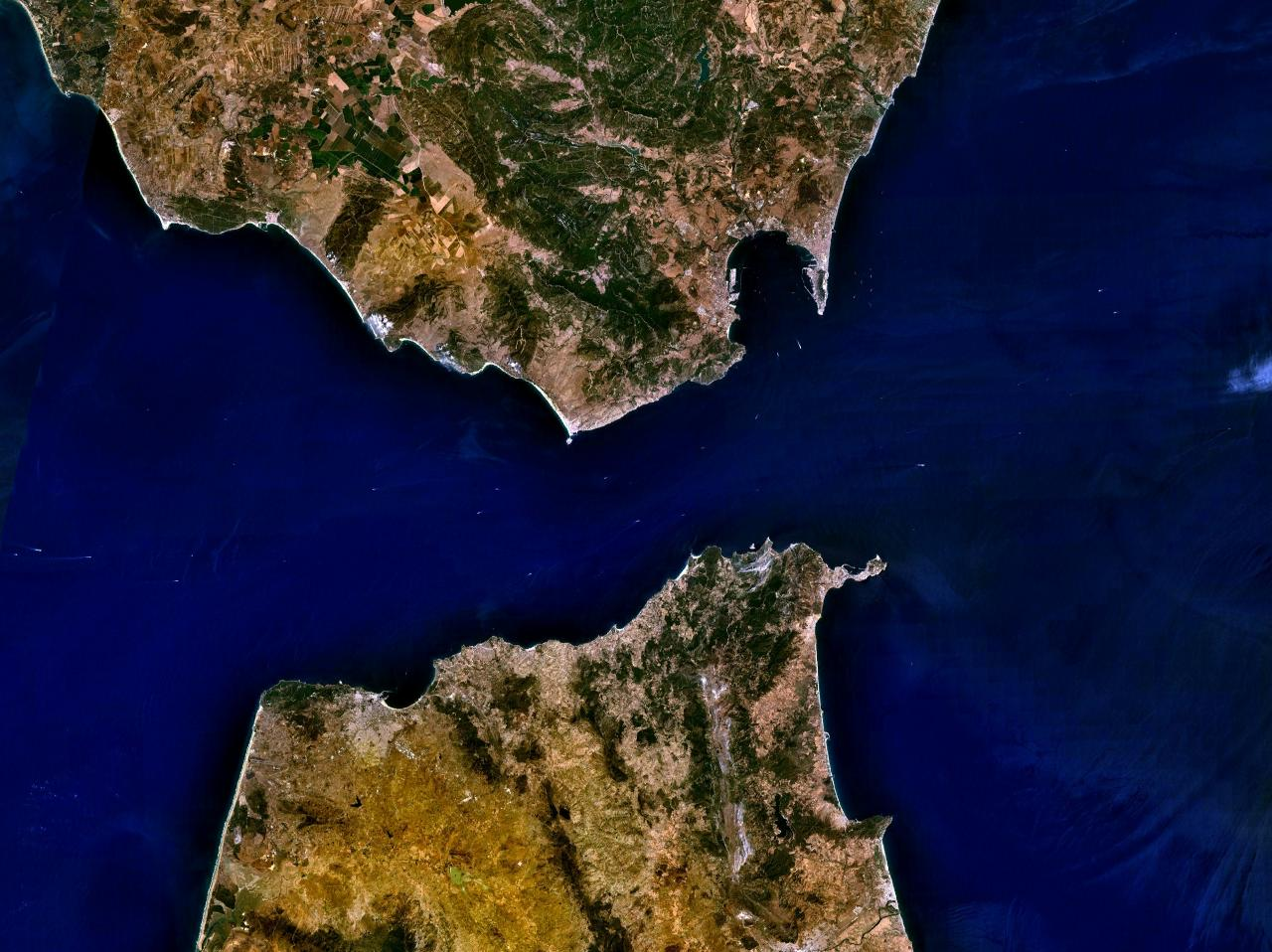
Tingitan peninsula on bottom (south)

The Tingitan Peninsula, also known as the Tangier Peninsula, is a small peninsula in northwest Africa, which together with the southernmost part of mainland Spain (Iberian Peninsula), forms the Strait of Gibraltar, the Atlantic Ocean boundary with the Mediterranean Sea. The principal cities are Tangier, Tétouan and Ceuta. Administratively, the peninsula belongs to the Moroccan prefectures of Tanger-Assilah, Fahs-Anjra, M'Diq-Fnideq and Tetouan, and the Spanish autonomous city of Ceuta. Historically it belonged to the province of Mauretania Tingitana.

For practical purposes, this peninsula is delimited to the south by the 35°20′ N parallel (a few kilometers north of the city of Larache). The other boundaries, as previously mentioned, are: the Atlantic Ocean to the west, the Mediterranean Sea to the east, and the Strait of Gibraltar to the north, which separates it from the Iberian Peninsula (the minimum distance between the two is just over 14 km).

Administratively, the peninsula is divided between the Moroccan region of Tangier-Tétouan-Al Hoceïma and the Spanish autonomous city of Ceuta. To the north, it faces the southern part of the province of Cádiz (in the autonomous community of Andalusia), ), the British Overseas Territory of Gibraltar, and the islet of Perejil (a *plaza de soberanía* with disputed status). It is also home to Morocco's northernmost geographical point, Punta Leona.
