= Wolfgang Thonke =

East German major general (1938–2019)

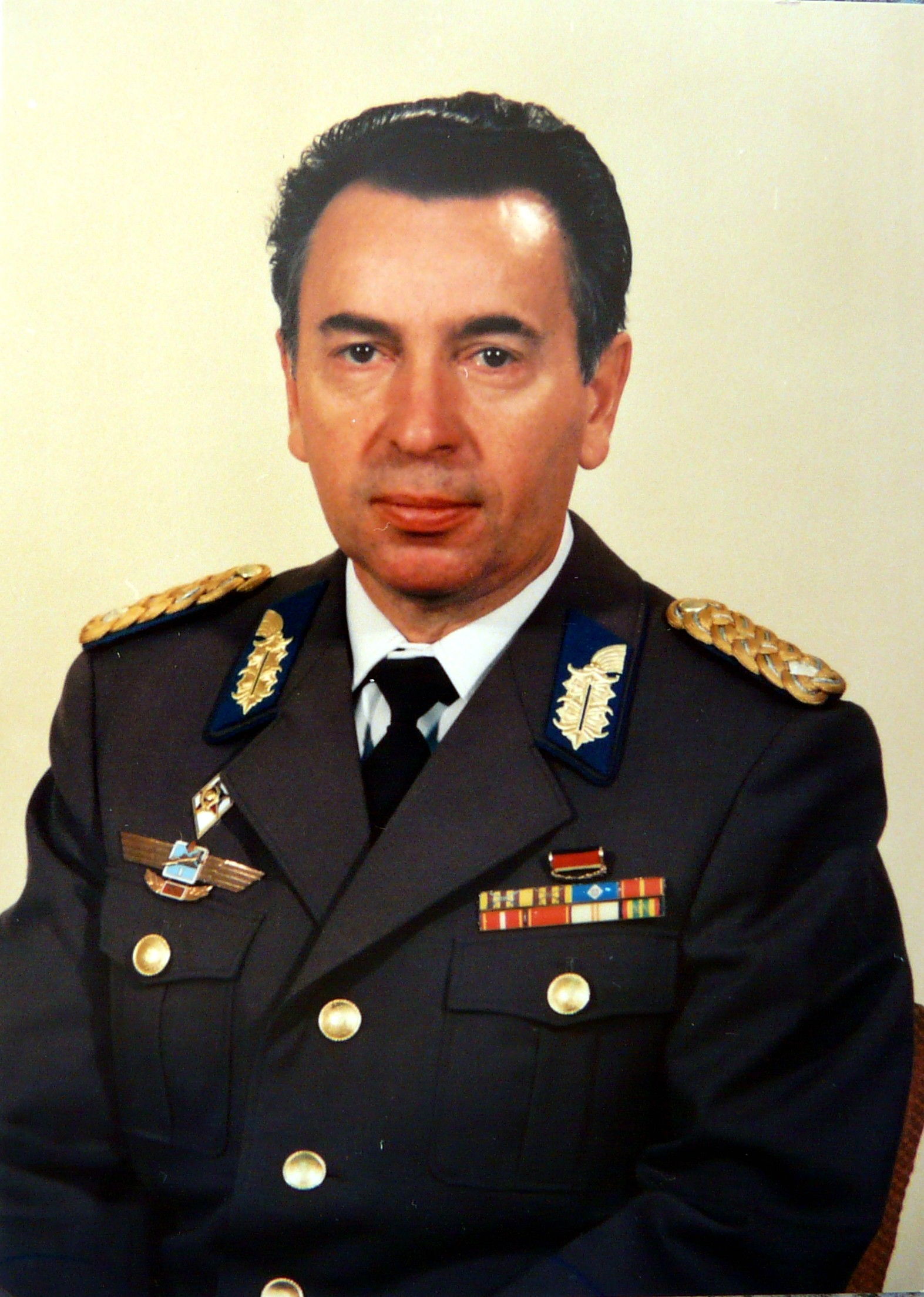
- Born: December 28, 1938; Schneidemühl (Piła, Province of Pomerania DR)
- Died: 21 January 2019 (aged 80) Strausberg (Brandenburg, DE)
- Allegiance: (East Germany) German Democratic Republic
- Branch: National People's Army; NPA Air Force
- Service years: 1957–1990
- Rank: Major general
- Commands: Commander Fighter squadron 1; Commander Officers academy „Otto Lilienthal“; DC general of the NPA AF/ADF (A3)
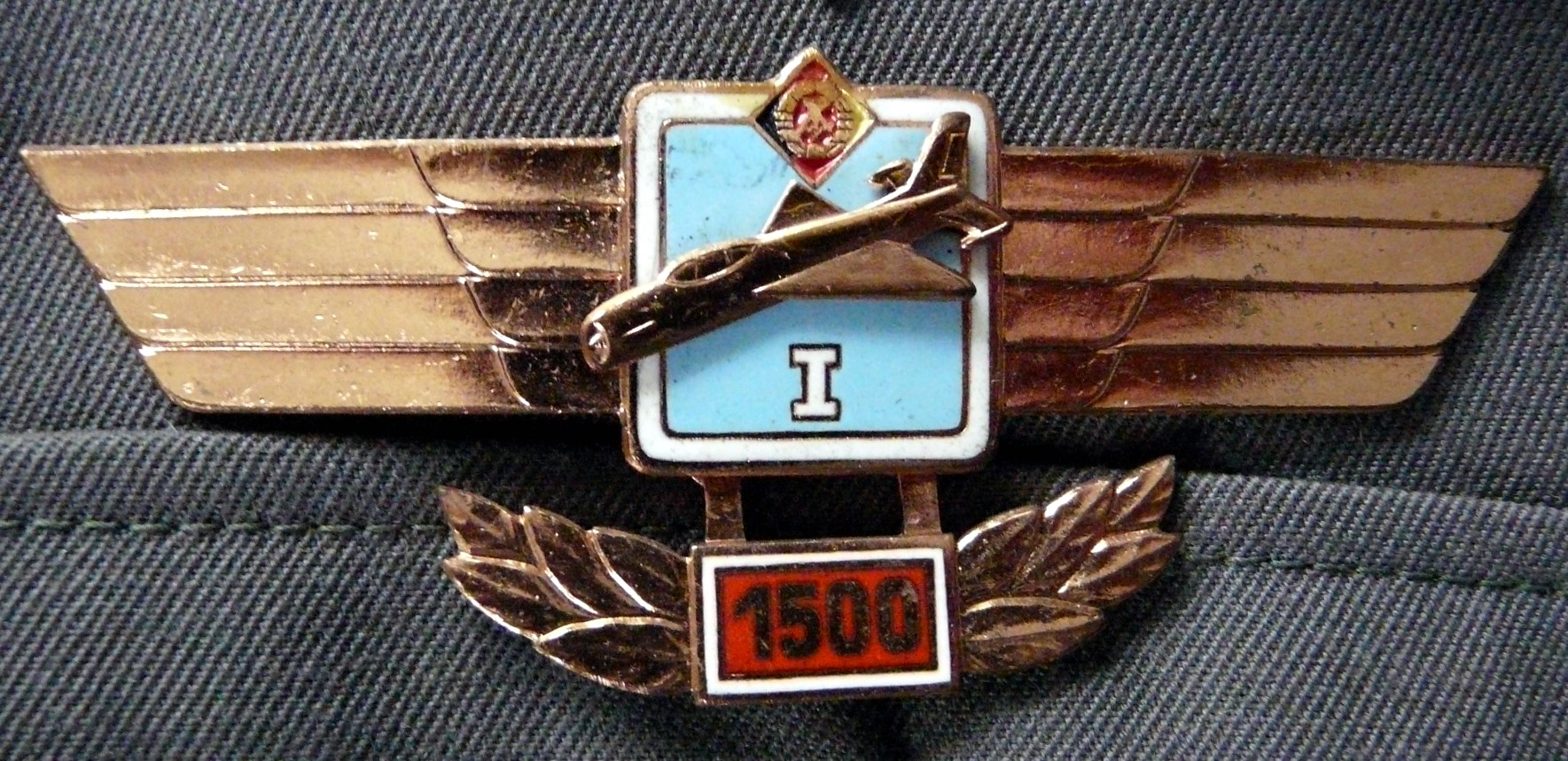
- Awards

Wolfgang Thonke (December 28, 1938 – January 22, 2019) was a journalist, graduated military scientist, major general, and was the last Deputy Commanding General (A3) of the National People's Army Air Force in the former German Democratic Republic. He was a military aviator/fighter pilot of “performance level I” (highest level) with more than 1,500 flight hours.

== Biography ==
Thonke was born in Schneidemühl, (modern Piła, Poland), as a child of a worker's family. After World War II he was expelled from his hometown and fled to relatives in Bautzen.

=== Military career ===
He successfully passed the school-leaving examination of the secondary school and joined the National People's Army in 1957 as a volunteer. There he became a professional soldier and applied for the attendance of the Air Force Officer's School in Bautzen. In 1958 he became a member of the Socialist Unity Party of Germany.

=== Education and first assignments ===
After graduation with distinction in 1959, he became a professional officer and served as flight instructor in the 3rd Fliegerausbildungsgeschwader of the Air Force Officer's School. From 1961 to 1965 it was followed by an assignment as instructor flight tactics/ weapon's control (German: Leiter Lufttaktik/ Luftschießen) of the Fliegerausbildungsgeschwader 15 on aerodrome Rotenburg/Görlitz.

=== Service as tutor/ instructor and staff officer ===
Due to his permanent excellent performance as tutor/ instructor and pilot, to train and educate officer students, possible future military pilots, on ground and on air, Thonke was promoted to captain, and in 1963 became A3 of the Air Force Officer's School.

After this assignment he served as deputy commander on flight training of the Air Force Officer’s School from 1968 to 1973.

Because he performed on this staff position excellent as well, he was delegated to high-school study on the Friedrich Engels Military Academy in Dresden from 1973 to 1975. Here he passed all examination with excellence and graduation in military science (de: Diplommilitärwissenschaftler, Dipl.-Mil.).

After successful graduation lieutenant colonel Thonke was appointed to Commander of the Jagdfliegergeschwader 1 (JG-1) from 1973 to 1975. Hereafter Thonke was assigned to the command and general staff officers course to the General Staff Academy (Russia) from 1975 to 1977. After successful study and promotion to military scientist Dr.rer.mil. colonel Thonke was assigned as chief of the flight inspection department of the Kommando LSK/LV.

Sequence of assignment to commander of the JG-1
Preceded by Major Siegfried Mittelbach (1968–1973)	actual assignment LtCol Wolfgang Thonke (1973–1974)	Succeeded by LtCol Eberhard Köllner (1974–1976)

This was followed by an engagement as A3 of the fighter aircraft units in 1981, and after that he became commander of the fighter aircraft units also in the Kommando LSK/LV. He served in this position until 1986.

=== Service as general ===
In 1986 W. Thonke was appointed to commander of the Officers high school „Otto Lilienthal” in Bautzen, and on October 7, 1987, he was appointed to major general. The final assignment on general rank from 1989 to 1990 W. Thonke performed as Assistant Commander in Chief A3 of the Air Force in the Kommando LSK/LV in Strausberg.

Sequence of assignment to Deputy Commander in Chief A3 of the Air Force
Preceded by Colonel Dieter Kleemann (Nov. 1, 1988 – Jan. 31, 1990)	actual assignment Major general Wolfgang Thonke (Feb. 1, 1990 – Oct. 2, 1990)	Succeeded by none

== Retirement ==
With the disbandment of the National People's Army, Major General Thonke retired with effective date of October 2, 1990.

== Orders and decorations ==
Among numerous orders and decorations major general Lothar Engelhardt was awarded with:

- Patriotic Order of Merit, in bronze
- Combat order "Of Merit for the Nation and Fatherland" (de: Kampforden „Für Verdienste um Volk und Vaterland), in silver, and bronze
- Meritorious Military Pilot of the German Democratic Republic
- Medal of Merit of the National People's Army, in gold, silver and bronze
- Medal Brotherhood in Arms, in silver
- Medal "For Strengthening of Brotherhood in Arms"
- Medal 30th Anniversary of the Foundation of the GDR (de: Medaille 30. Jahrestag der Gründung der DDR)
- Medal for Faithful Service in the National People's Army in bronze, silver, gold, and XX-years service (gold)

== Private ==
Dr. Wolfgang Thonke worked as a freelance journalist since 1990 and was member of the Fliegerstammtisch Strausberg. He found his last resting-place in the family burial-place of the churchyard St. Marine of Strausberg, 1 March 2019. Dr. Thonke died leaving his widow Karin and three children.

== Sources, references ==
- Schönbohm, Jörg. Two Armies and One Fatherland. Peter and Elfi Johnson, translators. Berghahn Books, Providence, Rhode Island, 1996 (originally published in 1992 in Germany as Zwei Armeen und ein Vaterland)
