= 5th Air Force Division =

Coordinates: 52.52719°N 13.83139°E

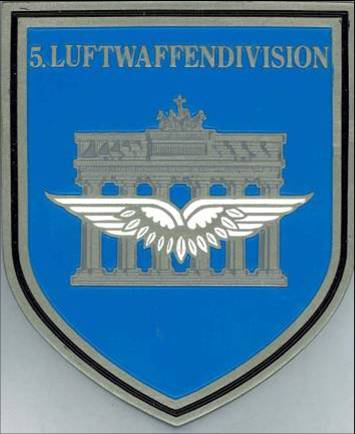
- Insignia
- Active: 1963–1971; 1990–1994
- Country: Germany
- Branch: German Air Force
- Part of: Luftwaffenführungskommando
- Garrison/HQ: Birkenfeld; Strausberg

The 5th Air Force Division (German: 5. Luftwaffendivision, 5. LWD) was a division of the Bundeswehr's German Air Force. It was located from 1963 to 1971 in Birkenfeld and from 1990 to 1994 in Strausberg (Eggersdorf). It was the successor of the Kommando LSK/LV.

== Overview ==
The 5th Air Division was formed in April 1963, after the creation in Trier of Fliegerführer Süd in 1959, which became Fliegerdivision Süd (Air Division South) in Karlsruhe in 1961. The division headquarters was located in Birkenfeld; up to the time of the first division were also assigned to ground-based air defense forces. From 1971 the division's units fell under the command of the 2nd Air Division.

The division was reformed after German reunification. On 3 October 1990 the existence of the National People's Army (NVA) ended. A preparation staff for the 5th Air Division was created on 3 October 1990 at Eggersdorf / Strausberg, headed by major general Bernhard Mende.

At that time some of the former NVA establishments existed with the existing personnel structures, including the LSK/LV command continued. The command over the forces of the former LSK/LV, however, was from 3 October 1990 with the leadership of the armed forces. This transitional period ended on 1 April 1991 with the creation of the 5th Air Division. In 1994 the 5th Air Division was disbanded and its units transferred to the 3rd Air Division, which was itself disbanded in 2006.

== Commanders from 1990 to 1994 ==
The commanders of the 5th Air Force from 1990 to 1994 were:

Name	Start	End
Major General Bernhard Mende	3 October 1990	30 September 1991
Major General Axel-Björn Kleppien	1 October 1991	May 1993
Major General Jürgen Höche	May 1993	31 March 1994

== Commanders from 1963 to 1971 ==
The commanders of the 5. Luftwaffendivision from 1963 to 1971 were:

Name	Start	End
Major General Kurt Kuhlmey	1963	31 March 1968
Major General Eberhard Gralka	1 April 1968	30 June 1969
Major General Hans-Werner Mehlen	1 July 1969	30 June 1971

== Units of the 5th Air Force ==
- Radarführungskommando 3, Fürstenwalde
- Jagdgeschwader 73, Rostock-Laage Airport
- FlakRak Geschwaders 51 and 52
- LTG 65, Neuhardenberg
- Nachrichtenregiment 14, Waldsieversdorf
