= Günter Voigt =

- Born: 2 January 1933 (age 93); Kleintrebnitz, Germany
- Allegiance: GDR
- Branch: NPA Air Force
- Service years: 1950–1990
- Rank: Major general
- Awards

Günter Voigt (born 2 January 1933), is a military scientist and retired major general, whose last assignment was as Deputy Commander in Chief and Chief of Staff of the Air Forces of the National People's Army in the former East Germany.

== Military career ==
After the vocational training, in 1950 Voigt joined the Volkspolizei as a volunteer. He then became a professional soldier and applied for attendance at the People's Police Officer's School in Pirna at Sonnenstein Castle. In 1952 Kursant (officer candidate) Voigt became a member of the Socialist Unity Party of Germany.

=== Education and first assignments ===
As the best school-leaver of the year 1952 Voigt was promoted over the junior officer's rank, (Sub-lieutenant) of the Barracked People's Police - Air, and was appointed to platoon leader of the "1st Aero Club Cottbus" (Code name: KVP-Site 600), the predecessor organization of the Verwaltung Luftstreitkräfte, later the Kommando LSK/LV of the National People's Army.

Due to his continuing excellent performance he became in 1965 deputy chief of the Abteilung Communications and Air Traffic Control of the "1st Aero Club Cottbus". Because he excelled at this staff position as well, he was delegated to high-school study to the Zhukovsky Air Force Engineering Academy of the Soviet Union. Here he passed all examinations with excellence and graduated with a diploma in military science in 1961. Simultaneously he was awarded with the gold medal for the best graduate 1961 of the Zhukovsky Air Force Engineering Academy as the best foreign graduate.

=== Service as staff officer ===
His permanent outstanding performance and the graduation with excellence recommended by his return to Germany the assignment as deputy chief of the Division Communications and Air Traffic Control of the Kommando LSK/LV. From 1962 to 1963 captain Voigt was Chief of the Communications Branch in that division. This tour of duty was followed by the assignment as Chief of the Division Communications and Air Traffic Control as successor of colonel Wagner. In 1967 he prompted to military scientist Dr.rer.mil.

After this Voigt was assigned to the command and general staff officers course at the General Staff Academy (Russia) from 1973 to 1975. His successor as Chief of the Division Communications and Air Traffic Control was lieutenant-colonel Erich Zettelmann.

After successful study colonel Voigt was assigned to Assistant Chief of Staff – Operations of the Kommando LSK/LV. As successor of major-general Joachim Herbst he worked on that high level staff position until January 1990. Among numerous projects and special tasks in that period he was in charge developing the so-called Air Force Operations- and Tactical Training Center (German: Operativ-Taktisches Ausbildungszentrums der LSK/LV ). With effect of 1 December 1989 Voigt was replaced by Colonel Siegfried Wünsche.

Promotions

- 28 December 1950 Kursant
- 1952 Lieutenant
- 1955 First lieutenant
- 1959 Captain
- 1964 Major
- 1969 Lieutenant colonel
- 1974 Colonel
- 7 October 1977 Major general

=== Service as General ===
On 7 October 1977, at the occasion of the 30th anniversary of the GDR, colonel Voigt was appointed to Major general (OF-6). His final general's assignment was to Deputy Commander in Chief and Chief of Staff of the NPA Air Force.

Sequence of assignment to Deputy Commander in Chief and Chief of Staff
predecessor: Major general Rolf Berger (1 February 1986 – 30 November 1989)	actual assignment Major general Günter Voigt (1 December 1989 – 30 September 1990)	successor: Colonel Siegfried Wuensche ( 1–2 Oct 1990)

== Retirement ==
With the disbandment of the National People's Army, major general Voigt retired effective 2 October 1990.

== Orders and decorations ==
Among numerous orders and decorations major general Voigt was awarded with:

- Patriotic Order of Merit, in bronze
- Combat order "Of Merit for the Nation and Fatherland" (de: Kampforden „Für Verdienste um Volk und Vaterland), in silver, and bronze
- Honorary title: "Meritorious Member of National People's Army" (de: Verdienter Angehöriger der Nationalen Volksarmee)
- Medal of Merit of the National People's Army, in gold, silver and bronze
- Medal of Comradeship in Arms (de: Medaille der Waffenbrüderschaft), in silver
- Medal "For Strengthening of Brotherhood in Arms"
- Medal 30th Anniversary of the Foundation of the GDR (de: Medaille 30. Jahrestag der Gründung der DDR)
- Medal for Faithful Service in the National People's Army in bronze, silver, gold, and XX-years service (gold)

== Personal life ==
Voigt is married to his wife Rosemarie, and since 1990 he has been working as independent author.
