= Herbert Scheibe =

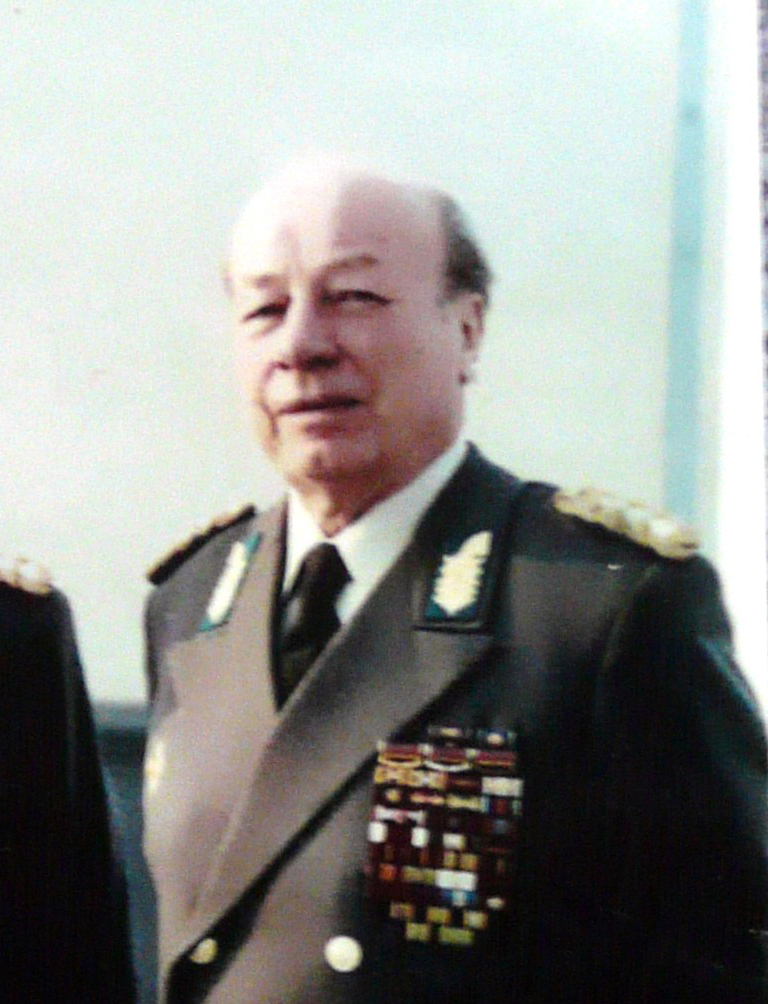
- Scheibe in 1982

Head of the Security Affairs Department of the Central Committee
- In office 14 March 1972 – 15 March 1985
- Secretary: Erich Honecker; Egon Krenz
- Deputy: Bruno Wansierski; Fritz Renckwitz; Siegfried Otto
- Preceded by: Walter Borning
- Succeeded by: Wolfgang Herger

Chief of the Air Forces/Air Defence Command
- In office 15 March 1967 – 14 March 1972
- Minister: Heinz Hoffmann
- Preceded by: Heinz Keßler
- Succeeded by: Wolfgang Reinhold

Personal details
- Born: 28 November 1914 Hohenmölsen, Province of Saxony, Kingdom of Prussia, German Empire (now Saxony-Anhalt, Germany)
- Died: 7 February 1991 (aged 76) Berlin, Germany
- Party: Socialist Unity Party (1946–1989)
- Other political affiliations: Communist Party of Germany (1945–1946)
- Occupation: Military Officer; Party Functionary; Policeman
- Central institution membership: 1975–1986: Full member, Central Committee; 1967–1975: Candidate member, Central Committee

Herbert Scheibe (born Hohenmölsen 28 November 1914: died Berlin 7 February 1991) was an East German Generaloberst and, between 1967 and 1972, Commanding general of the country's Airforce.

== Life ==
=== Early years ===
Scheibe was born in a sleepy market town in Saxony-Anhalt, some 45 km (28 miles) south-west of Leipzig. His father was a labourer and his mother was a cook. Scheibe was bought up by his grandparents, both of whom were early members of the German Communist Party (KPD). He received a basic education at the small local school and then undertook an apprenticeship as a typesetter in Gohlis (Leipzig).

=== Political activism and detention during the Nazi years ===
Between 1930 and 1933 Scheibe was a member of the Young Communists (KJVD / Kommunistischer Jugendverband Deutschlands). In January 1933 the National Socialists seized power and membership of political parties (other than of the Nazi Party) almost immediately became illegal. During the ensuing twelve years most of Scheibe's life was spent in prisons and concentration camps. He was arrested in August 1933, charged with preparing to commit high treason ("Vorbereitung zum Hochverrat") and sentenced to eight months of detention, which he spent at the Bautzen Correction Centre. He was released in June 1934 but appears to have continued to undertake illegal political activities and was arrested again in June 1935, faced the same charge as a before, and was sentenced to a further two years. He was initially taken back to Bauzen before being transferred, in 1937, to Buchenwald where at one stage he was put in charge of the camp post office. He also spent a large amount of time during the Nazi period in a Correction Centre in Zwickau.

=== The Soviet occupation zone / The German Democratic Republic ===
The war ended in May 1945 and with it the Nazi regime. Scheibe at once joined the Communist Party (KPD), which the next year, following a forced merger of political parties, would leave him as a member of the country's ruling Socialist Unity Party (SED/ Sozialistische Einheitspartei Deutschlands).

==== Military career ====
On 1 June 1945 he joined the People's Police (VP / Volkspolizei) in the Soviet occupation zone (SBZ / Sowjetische Besatzungszone), in the central part of what had till recently been Germany. This was the part of the country in which he had grown up, and it was the part that during the next few years would evolve into the German Democratic Republic (East Germany). From 1945 till 1948 Scheibe was deputy head of the Criminal Police in Leipzig, then serving from 1948 till 1949 as the Head of the Criminal Police in Görlitz. The following year he was selected and sent for special training in the Soviet Union.

After returning to East Germany he joined the Volkspolizei-Bereitschaft (literally "Standby Police") in Prenzlau. Immediately following the Second World War there had been agreement among the occupying powers that there was no place for an army in Germany, but in East Germany the Volkspolizei (people's police) nevertheless retained some of the quasi-military characteristics associated with the police services under the Hitler regime: by 1950 the "Standby Police" were coming to be seen as a military force by another name. Between 1951 and 1956 Scheibe served in various leadership capacities with the Kasernierte Volkspolizei (literally " People's Police in barracks"), a different (and in the end larger) quasi-military police service which would in retrospect become recognised as the precursor of the East German National People's Army.

Promotions

- 1957 Oberst (colonel)
- 7 October 1961 Generalmajor
- 1 March 1966 Generalleutnant
- 1 March 1972 Generaloberst (Colonel general)

The National People's Army (NVA / Nationale Volksarmee ) was founded in 1956. Herbert Scheibe took a job with the Ministry of National Defence (MfNV) as Chief of Military Reconnaissance. A period of study at the General Staff (Military) Academy in Moscow followed. Scheibe returned from Moscow in 1959 and became Deputy Chief of the General Staff and Chief of Operations in the newly established army. Between 1960 and 1967 he served as Chief and Chief of Staff in the Air-force. In 1967 he was appointed Chief of the Air-force, a high-profile position which he held till 1972.

==== Political promotions ====
Scheibe was placed on the (lengthy) candidate list for membership of the Party Central Committee in 1967. He served as a member of the Central Committee from 1975 till 1986. From 1972 till his retirement from active service on 15 March 1985 General Colonel Scheibe served in succession to General Lieutenant Walter Borning as Head of the Department for Security Affairs of the Party Central Committee.

== Honours and awards ==
- 1964 Patriotic Order of Merit in Silver
- 1966 Order of Battle for services to the People and the Fatherland in Gold
- 1973 Grand Order for Military Service (Highest Chilean military decoration)
- 1974 Order of Karl Marx
- 1975 Friedrich Engels Prize
- 1979 Scharnhorst Order
- 1979 Ernst Schneller Medal in Gold
- 1979 Patriotic Order of Merit in Gold
- 1981 Patriotic Order of Merit Gold clasp
- East German Service Medal
- Distinguished Service Medal of the National People's Army in Gold
