= Wolfgang Reinhold =

Colonel General of DDR

Generaloberst Wolfgang Reinhold
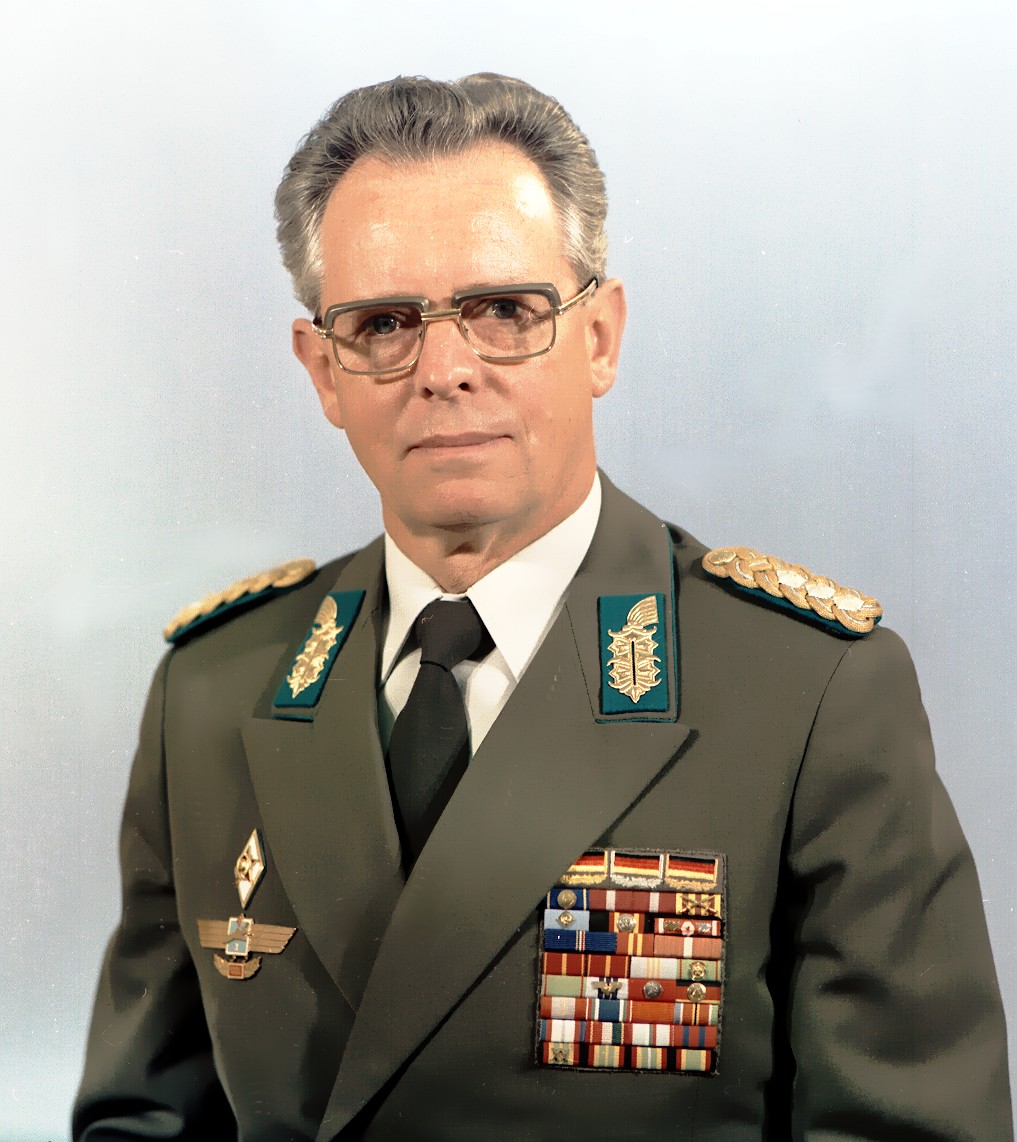
- Wolfgang Reinhold (1986)

Deputy Minister of National Defence (East Germany)
- In office December 1972 – 31 December 1989

Commander of Kommando LSK/LV
- In office March 1972 – 31 December 1989
- Preceded by: Herbert Scheibe
- Succeeded by: Rolf Berger

Personal details
- Born: 16 April 1923 Friedrichshagen (Berlin), Germany
- Died: 2 September 2012 (aged 89) Bad Saarow, Brandenburg, Germany
- Party: Socialist Unity Party of Germany

Military service
- Allegiance: Nazi Germany (1941-1945); East Germany (1952-1989)
- Branch/service: Luftwaffe; Kasernierte Volkspolizei; Nationale Volksarmee
- Years of service: 1941-45; 1952-89
- Rank: Generaloberst

Wolfgang Reinhold (16 April 1923 - 2 September 2012) was a German Colonel General. He was a Deputy Minister of Defence and, between 1972 and 1989, head of the Kommando LSK/LV (Airforce branch) of the National People's Army in the German Democratic Republic (East Germany).

== Life ==
Wolfgang Reinhold was born the eldest of five children in Friedrichshagen on the southeastern side of Berlin. His father worked at one stage as a chauffeur but also experienced lengthy periods of unemployment, and in 1927 the family relocated to Dresden in search of work. On leaving school, between 1938 and 1940 Reinhold worked as a salesman, before moving to Dresden where he started a traineeship with a bank. 1941 was the year of his eighteenth birthday. War had begun in 1939, and from 1941 till 1945 Reinhold served in the German Luftwaffe (airforce), which he survived, ending up as a Feldwebel, a non-commissioned officer rank. War ended in defeat for Germany in May 1945: from then until July 1949, he was held by the Soviets as a Prisoner of War. During his imprisonment he faced an "Anti-Fascist Education" programme that included a period in Moscow.

Following his release in 1949 Reinhold returned to the southern part of the Soviet occupation zone in what remained of Germany, working in Jena as an assistant Lathe Operator with VEB, Carl Zeiss, now, with the entire zone under Soviet Administration, a state owned operation. He then moved to Zschorna and became a teacher and head at the regional Leadership Training establishment for Saxony of the Free German Youth (FDJ / Freie Deutsche Jugend) organisation. In October 1949 the Soviet occupation zone was formally refounded as the Soviet sponsored German Democratic Republic. The FDJ was in many respects the youth wing of what had become the new country's ruling Socialist Unity Party (SED / Sozialistische Einheitspartei Deutschlands), and in 1950 Wolfgang Reinhold, now aged 27, joined the SED itself.

Within the party he was section leader in the central council of the FDJ, and in May 1952 succeeded in joining the "FDJ Contribution for the Armed Protection of the Republic" ("FDJ-Aufgebot zum bewaffneten Schutz der Republik"). His contribution included service, between 1952 and 1954, as commander of the quasi-military "KVP" for the Cottbus district. Back in 1945 the Winning Powers had a shared perception that any future Germany should operate without any sort of military component, but during the early 1950s, Cold War realities established themselves: both Washington and Moscow evidently changed their position on the militarisation of their respective zones of influence in Germany. In East Germany the National People's Army was formally established in March 1957, effectively as a rebranding and expansion of a quasi-military police department based in Strausberg and known, till that point, as the "People's Police in Barracks" ("Kasernierte Volkspolizei"). Between 1956 and 1957 Reinhold served as Commander of the new army's Third Air-defence Division in Drewitz.

Following a period of study at a Soviet Military academy in 1957/58, Reinhold served in various increasingly senior positions within the Kommando LSK/LV (Airforce branch). His promotion to Major general followed on 7 October 1963. A longer period of study in Moscow, attending the Moscow General Staff Military Academy between 1965 and 1967, led to a degree in Military Sciences. After his return from Moscow he was appointed "Deputy Head of the LSK/LV and Chief of Staff", a position he held till 1972.

In March 1972 Reinhold was appointed head of the Kommando LSK/LV (Airforce branch) of the National People's Army in succession to Herbert Scheibe. At the end of the year, in December 1972, Reinhold received an additional appointment as a Deputy Minister of Defence. He was promoted to the rank of Lieutenant general and then, in 1979 as part of celebrations of the thirtieth anniversary of the country's foundation, to that of Colonel General. Between 1981 and 1989 he was also a candidate for membership of the powerful Party Central Committee.

Awards and honours
- 1976 Honorific title: Meritorious Military Pilot of the German Democratic Republic
- 1981 Scharnhorst Order
- 1983 Patriotic Order of Merit in Gold
- 1984 Patriotic Order of Merit Gold clasp
- 1988 Order of Karl Marx

In November 1989 the breach of the Berlin Wall and the clear evidence that the Soviet forces in East Germany had no orders to suppress with force the growing tide of anti-government protest that had taken hold in the country triggered a sequence of events which would lead to the demise of the stand-alone German Democratic Republic and its one-party dictatorship, and culminate with German reunification, formally in October 1990. On 31 December 1989 Wolfgang Reinhold resigned his position, together with the country's commander of land-forces, Colonel General Horst Stechbarth, and the head of the Central Political Administration of the National People's Army, Horst Brünner. The three of them went into retirement. Reinhold was investigated at this time for possible abuse of office, corruption or personal enrichment, but no charges were proffered against him.

== Personal ==
Wolfgang Reinhold was married with three children. His son Ralph Reinhold became a pilot in the German Air Force and was killed while commanding a TU-154M surveillance plane on 13 September 1997 as the result of a collision off the coast of Namibia with an American military transport plane.
