= Nachrichtenregiment 14 =

Coordinates: 52.5162°N 14.0325°E

Nachrichtenregiment 14 (Signal Regiment 14) — III —
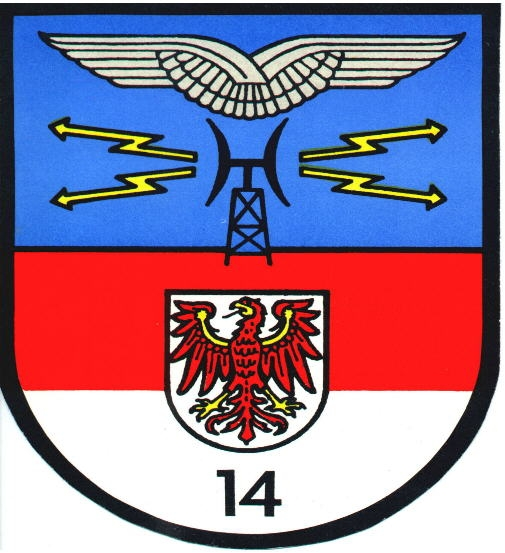
- Active: 1956 - April 1, 1993
- Country: East Germany
- Branch: Air Forces of the National People's Army
- Part of: Air Force Command (Kommando LSK/LV)
- Garrison/HQ: Waldsieversdorf/ Rotes Luch

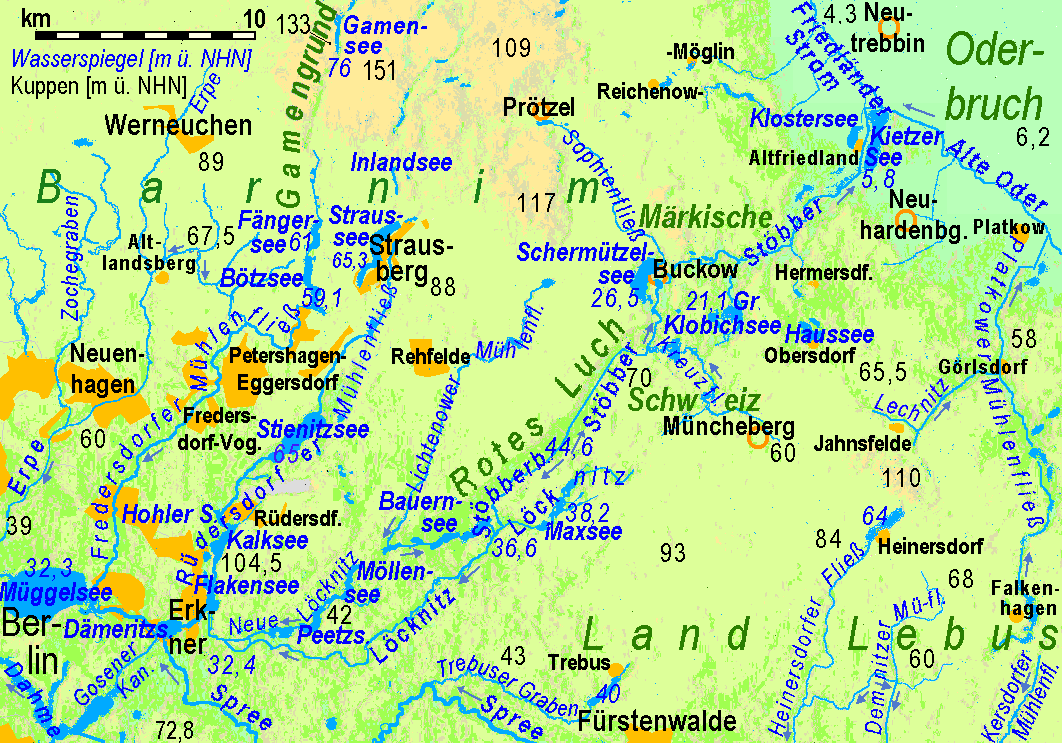
Rotes Luch between Berlin and the Oderbruch.

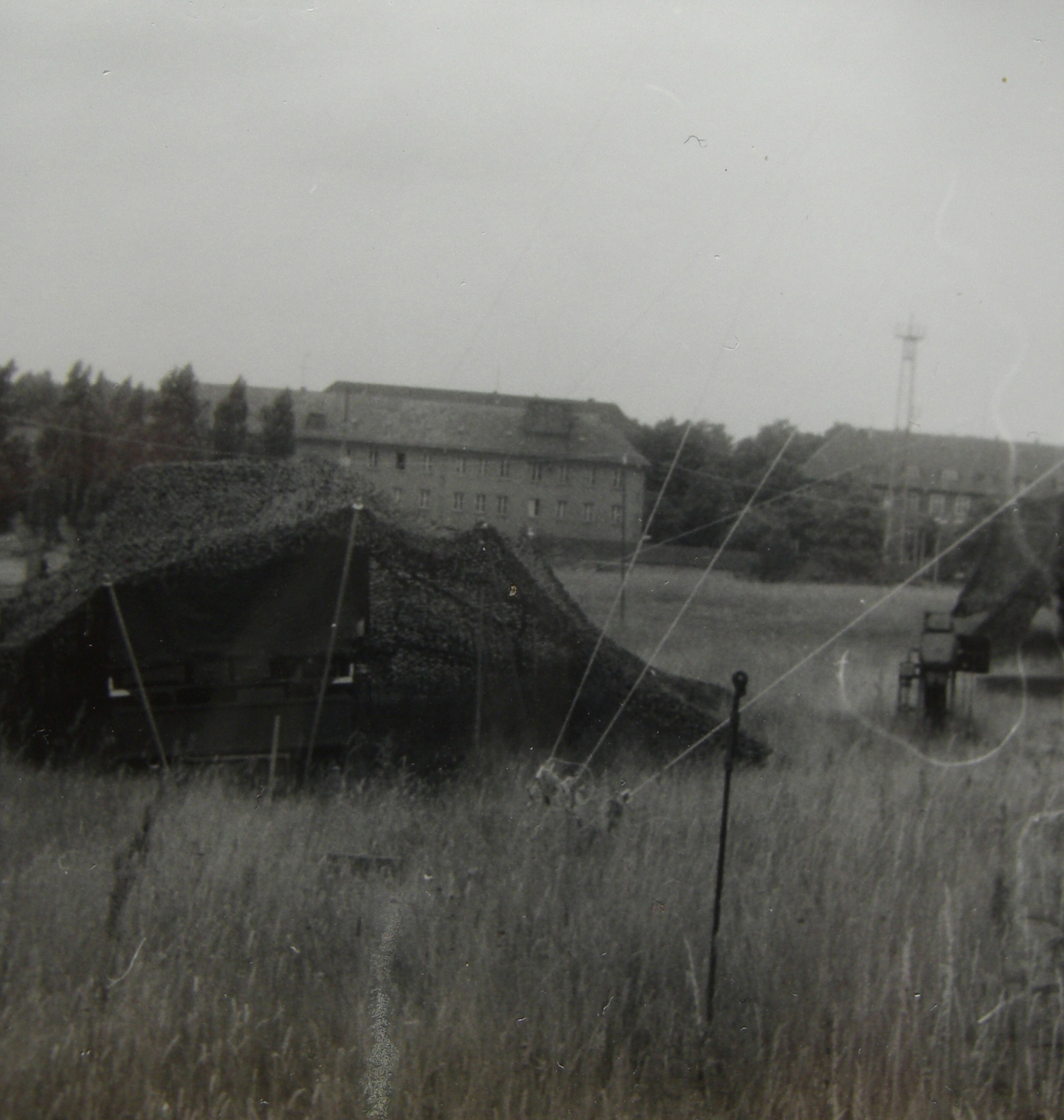
Radio relay station RT-415 on the site Roten Luch.

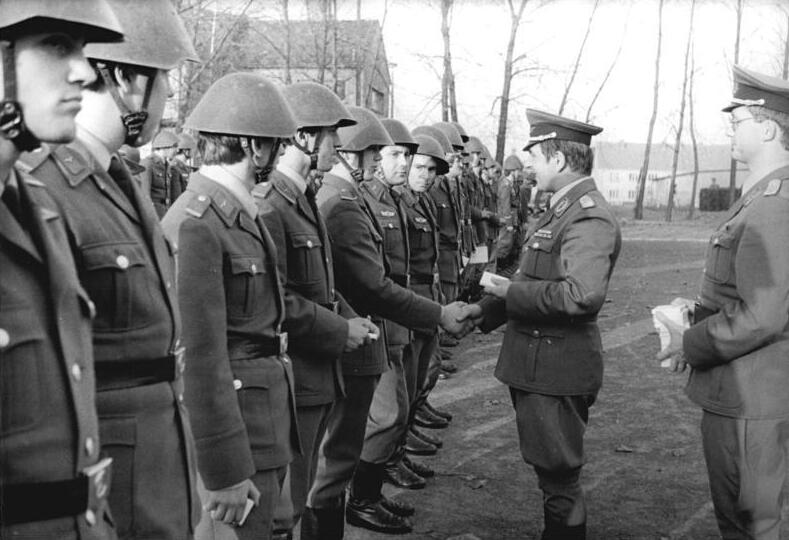
Dismissal of reservists in 1983, by LtCol Ingo Brosig (center) and Captain Jörg Ludwig (right).

The Nachrichenregiment 14 (NR-14) "Harro Schulze-Boysen" was a signal regiment-sized unit of the National People's Army (NVA) Air Forces of the National People's Army of the former East Germany (GDR). The primary task of that unit consisted in the signal support to the Air Force Command (Kdo LSK/LV) as well as of the Main Operation Centre (MOC), the so-called ZGS LSK/LV.

In German, the word Nachrichtenregiment can be ambiguous, and imply an intelligence/signal intelligence purpose. However, this regiment was unequivocally primarily a signal unit.

== History ==
NR-14 was established in 1956 as a battalion-sized signal unit (de. Nachrichtenbataillon 2) in Waldsieversdorf (Rotes Luch).

After interim steps in 1960 this battalion was expanded to become the Signal Regiment 19 (NR-19), a regiment-sized unit. In 1967, the name of honour Harro Schulze-Boysen was dedicated to this particular signal regiment. Subsequent to restructuring in 1970 the unit received finally the designation Nachrichtenregiment 14 (NR-14), Harro Schulze-Boysen.

== Organization ==
The NR-14 was direct supported to the NVA Air Force Command (Kdo LSK/LV) with the organization structure as follows:

- Signal battalion HQ Kdo LSK/LV (stationary)
  - Signal Operation's Office / COMMCEN Strausberg (Eggersdorf), alternative COMMCEN-22
  - Radio Relay Axis (RVG-961, stationary) with 10 radio relay sites (in bunkers)
  - Radio Transmitter Center (stationary) with 4 RX sites
  - COMMCEN Ranzig / Beeskow, alternative COMMCEN-23
- Signal battalion MOC Kdo LSK/LV (stationary)
  - COMMCEN Fürstenwalde Bunker Fuchsbau, Alternative COMMCEN-21
  - Transmission Center Fürstenwalde 2
  - Two radio companies, key telegraph, RX center (HF)
- Training battalion communications and Air Traffic Control
  - Two training companies
- Radio battalion (deployable) with TX stations HF long distance (stationary)
  - Telephone, teleprinter, switchboard, carrier frequency telephone/voice frequency telegraphy
  - HF, Aeronautical mobile service
  - Radio relay stations (deployable, up to 24 standard telephone channels)
  - Field cable laying equipment (cable: LFL, FFK 36/250, FVK 60)
  - Special equipment: Battle command center (de: GFZ)
  - TX site HF (partial stationary) TX Center-2
- Repair and maintenance company

== Organization after disbandment of the NVA ==
With the disbandment of the NVA in 1990 the stationary HF transmitter site (Limsdorf) was long-lasting integrated into the organization structure of the German Air Force (GAF). Also, some handheld equipment and the so-called aeronautical radio equipment east were integrated to the equipment pool Deployable Air Situation Display and Interface Processor System (DASDIPS).

After that the NR-14, meanwhile Fernmeldeabteilung 14 (FmAbt-14), was disbanded April 1, 1993. The Bundswehr site Waldsieversdorf (Rotes Luch) was given up as well.

The in-service support management for DASDIPS equipment, in operation at present, is with GAF Weapon Systems Command. The operational responsibility to DASDIPS is with the German Air Force Command.

Commanding officers
1956–1961	LtCol H. Müller
1961–1963	LtCol K. Frohberg
1963–1968	LtCol H-J. Brandenburg
1968–1975	Col K. Frohbertg
1975–1988	Col. M. Werner
1988–1990	Col. H-U. Augustin
1990–2003	LtCol Boesenberg

== Sources ==
- Präzisierung Bildung NR-19 aus NB-2 und NB-12 anhand Dok. im Militärarchiv Freiburg
- Auszug Direktive 1/85 als Kopie aus der VS-Stelle/ Registratur A2 Kdo 5. Luftwaffendivision Herbst 1991
- Org-Befehl 11/1990 ff. des Kommandeur Kdo LSK/LV Vorbereitungsstab 5. LwDiv
- Chronik der 5. Luftwaffendivision- Verfasser Major i.G. Gäbelein

== Literature ==
- Wilfried Kopenhagen: Die Luftstreitkräfte der NVA, Motorbuch, Stuttgart, 2002, ISBN 3-613-02235-4
