= Rotes Luch =

Reclaimed fen area

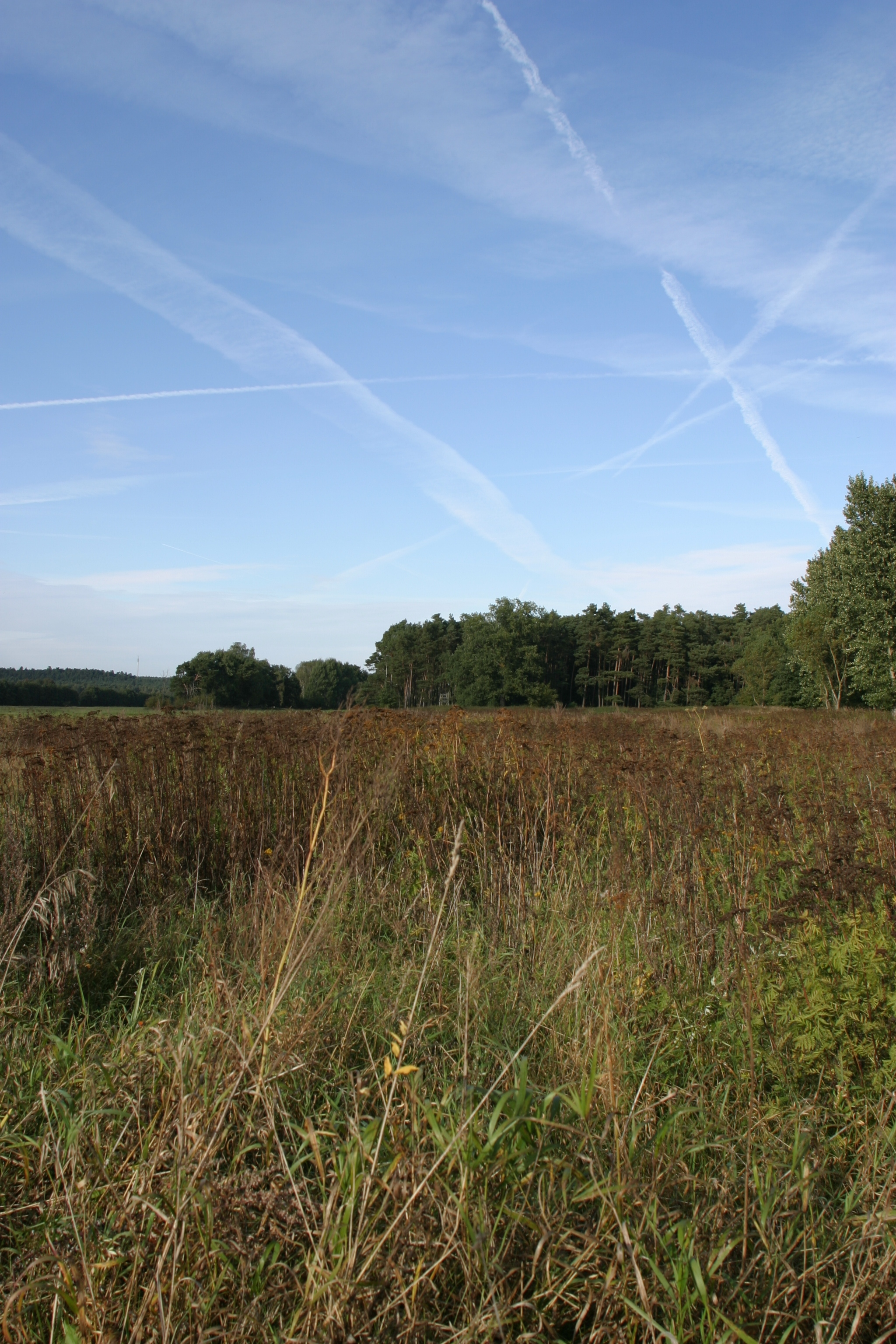
- Landscape between Berlin and the Oderbruch

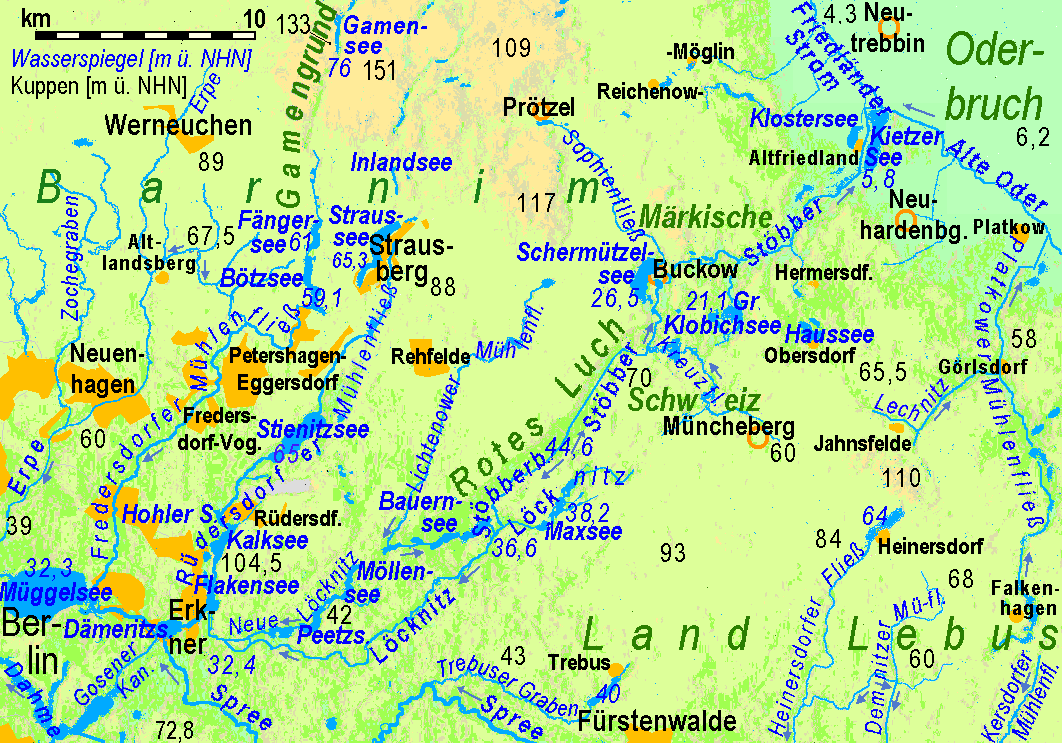
- Rotes Luch between Berlin and the Oderbruch
- Floor elevation: 45 metres (148 ft) up to 48 metres (157 ft)

Geology
- Type: Plain grassland, glade, fen area
- Age: Glacial period of the Holocene

Geography
- Location: near Waldsieversdorf, Märkische Schweiz, Brandenburg, Germany
- Coordinates: 52°31′26″N 14°01′41″E
- Mountain range: Glacial valley, Märkische Schweiz Nature Park

Rotes Luch (literally "Red Glade") is a reclaimed (i.e. drained) fen area, known locally as a luch, and extends to a width of about 1 kilometre (0.62 mi) over a length of approximately 10 kilometres (6.2 mi) from southwest to northeast. It is located in the southwestern corner of the nature reserve Märkische Schweiz (German: Naturpark Märkische Schweiz) of Brandenburg, Germany.

== Geography ==
The Red Glade is the highest part of the glacial trough building a passage between the Berlin glacial valley (German: Urstromtal) at Erkner and the Oder river valley (German: Oderbruch) respectively the Eberswalde glacial valley near Neutrebbin. This depression, also known as Buckow Groove (German: Buckower Rinne), separates the northwestern plateau of the Barnim (de) from the southeastern upland area of the Land Lebus. The high embankment of the Eastern Railway crosses the area from west to east. The headwaters of the small stream Stobber are located here. Due to the drainage divide between Baltic Sea and North Sea that runs along the railway embankment, there is the peculiar situation that the stream flows in two different directions. This phenomenon is called "pseudo-bifurcation".

== Flora and fauna ==
The continental biogeographic region of the Nature Park and Landscape Protection Area Rotes Luch including the Nature Reserve Tiergarten covers a surface of 1,255.66 hectares (4.8481 sq mi) and provides habitat types as are

- Dry, frequently open grasslands on calciferous sand
- Semi-natural dry grasslands and scrubland facies on calcareous substrates (Festuco-Brometalia)
- Alkaline fens
- Sub-Atlantic and medio-European oak or oak-hornbeam forests of the Carpinion betuli (de)
- Alluvial forests with black alder (Alnus glutinosa) and European ash (Fraxinus excelsior).

Important orchid sites are reported on dry grassland, and marsh marigold (Caltha palustris) on wetland.

The Natura 2000 report mentioned fish as there are the spined loach (Cobitis taenia), the European weather loach (Misgurnus fossilis) and the European bitterling (Rhodeus sericeus amarus). Observed mammals are the European beaver (Castor fiber) and the European otter (Lutra lutra).

== Human interference ==
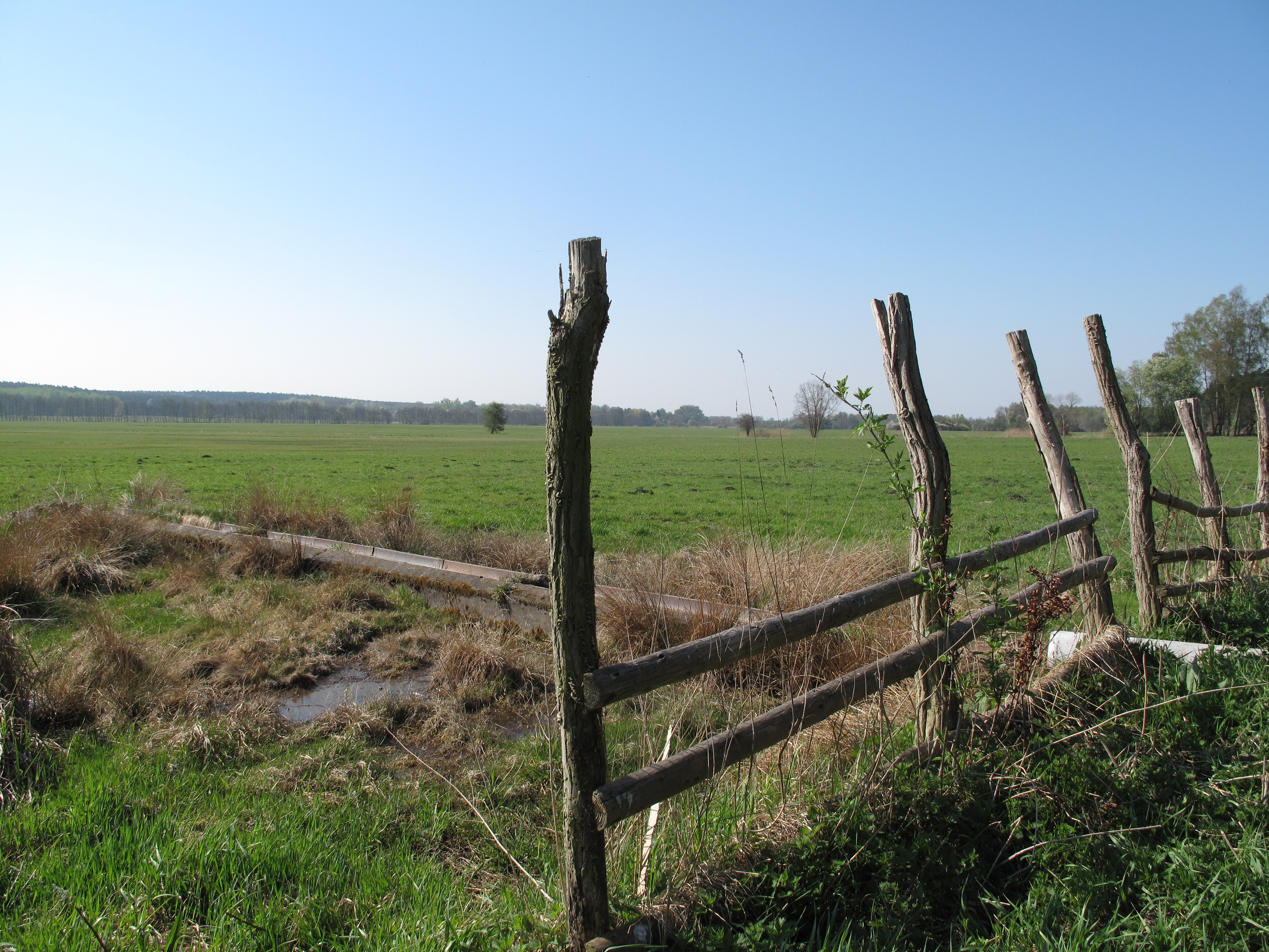
Grassland in the Rotes Luch

Since the early 20th century large areas of the landscape had been used as a landfill, mostly with rubbish from Berlin transported on the route of the Eastern Railway. With the proclamation of the Märkische Schweiz Nature Park in 1990 a new phase of land use began where the compatibility between nature and human use should be significantly improved.

From 1956 to 1993 the Nachrichtenregiment 14 of the NPA Air Force was stationed in the Red Glade.

== Activities ==
The upper part of Rotes Luch is touched by the E11 European long distance path. The section of this hiking trail that comes from Buckow follows the north-western edge of the glade to the railway line before it turns west toward Strausberg.
