= Hakenfelde Prison =

Prison in Germany

Coordinates: 52°34′09″N 13°12′41″E

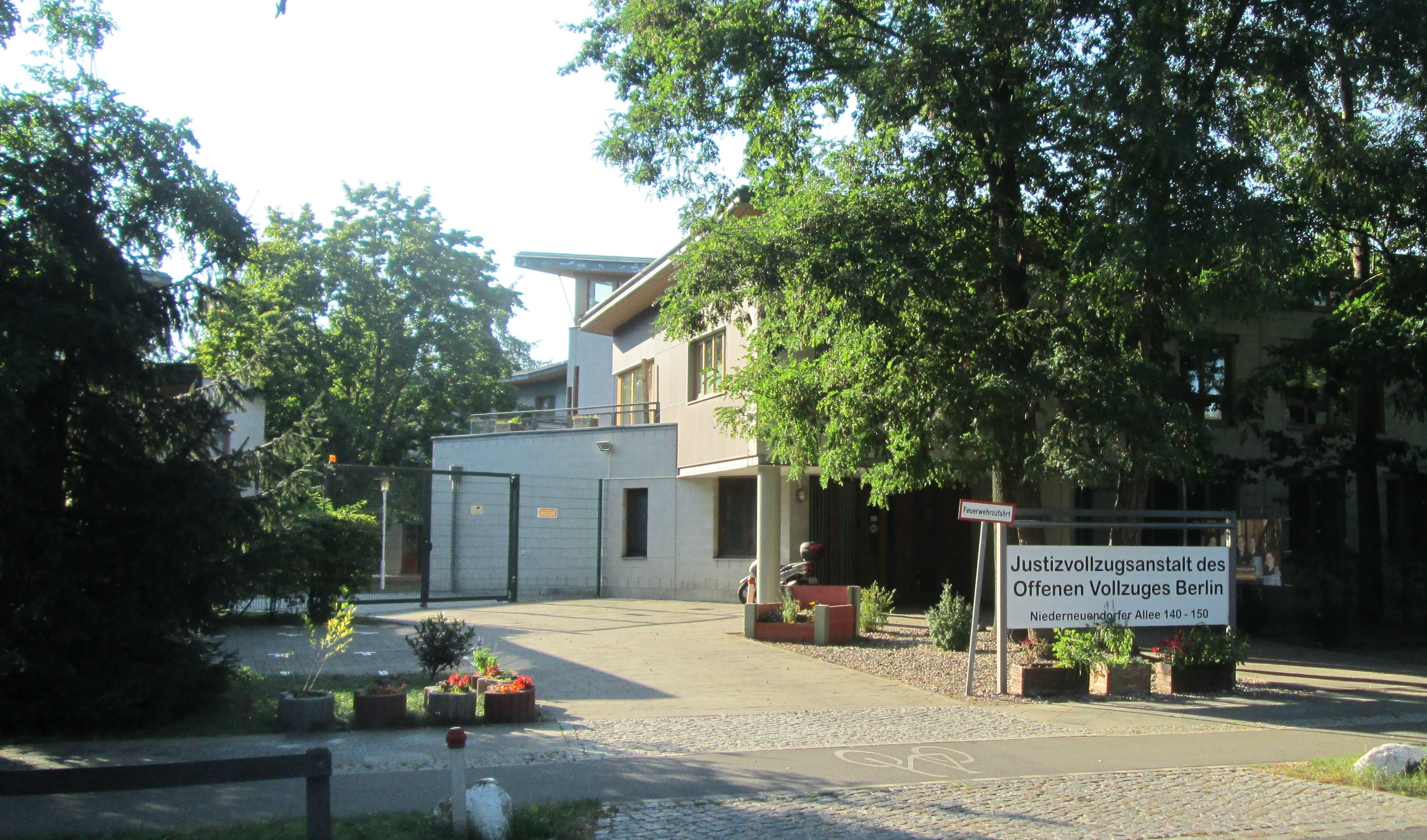

Hakenfelde Prison (German: Justizvollzugsanstalt Hakenfelde, JVA Hakenfelde) is a low-security prison in Hakenfelde in Berlin, operated by the State of Berlin Department of Corrections. It was opened on 1 March 1978 in what was then West Berlin, and was originally a branch of Düppel Prison. It became an independent correctional institution in 1991. Between 1995 and 1998, its old barracks were replaced by a modern prison building. It has a capacity of 908 prisoners.

Several former communist leaders of East Germany served their sentences there, including Egon Krenz, Günter Schabowski, and Heinz Keßler.
