= Medal "For Strengthening of Brotherhood in Arms" =

Medal "For Strengthening Military Cooperation"
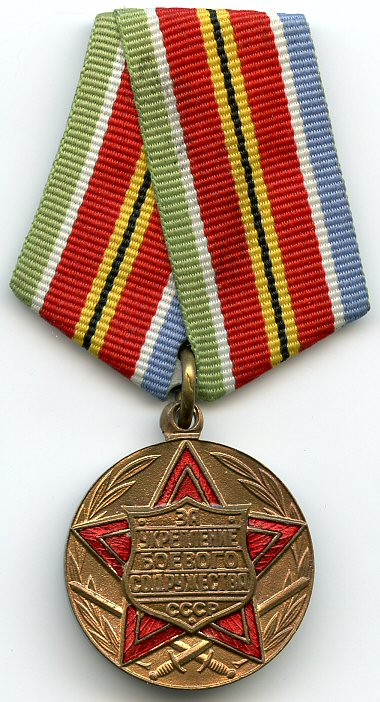
- Medal "For Strengthening Military Cooperation" (obverse)
- Type: Military decoration
- Awarded for: Merit in strengthening military cooperation
- Presented by: USSR
- Eligibility: Citizens of the Soviet Union and other socialist states
- Status: No longer awarded
- Established: May 25, 1979
- Ribbon of the Medal "For Strengthening of Brotherhood in Arms"

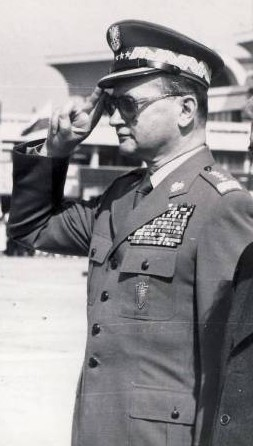
Polish General Wojciech Jaruzelski, a recipient of the Medal "For Strengthening of Brotherhood in Arms"

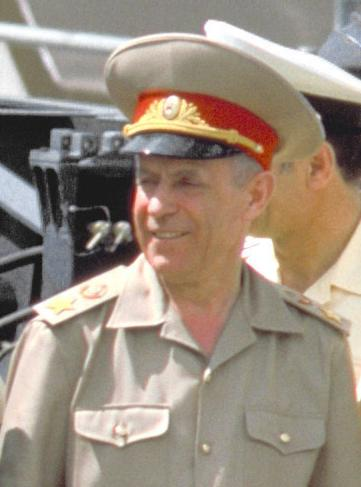
Marshal of the Soviet Union Sergey Akhromeyev, a recipient of the Medal "For Strengthening of Brotherhood in Arms"

The Medal "For Strengthening Military Cooperation" (Russian: Медаль «За укрепление боевого содружества») was a military award of the Soviet Union established on May 25, 1979, by Decree of the Presidium of the Supreme Soviet. Its statute was later confirmed and slightly amended by Decree of the Presidium of the Supreme Soviet No. 2523-X of July 18, 1980. It was bestowed to recognise outstanding cooperation between the different services and the different armed forces of the various Warsaw Pact countries or of any other friendly socialist state.

== Award statute ==
The Medal "For Strengthening Military Cooperation" was awarded to military personnel as well as to employees of organs of state security or of the Ministry of Internal Affairs, and to other citizens of the states participants of the Warsaw Pact, as well as other socialist and other friendly nations for merit in strengthening military cooperation.

The conferring authority was the Presidium of the Supreme Soviet of the USSR based on recommendations from the Minister of Defence or the USSR, the Minister of Internal Affairs of the USSR, or from the Chairman of the State Security Committee of the USSR. The medal could be earned multiple times.

The Medal "For Strengthening Military Cooperation" is worn on the left side of the chest and in the presence of other medals of the Soviet Union is located after the medal "Veteran of the Armed Forces of the USSR". When worn in company of awards of the Russian Federation, the latter have precedence.

== Award description ==
The Medal "For Strengthening Military Cooperation" was a 32mm in diameter gilt tombac circular medal. On the obverse, a red enamelled five pointed star with a shield at its center. The shield is not enamelled and bears the relief inscription in five rows “"FOR STRENGTHENING MILITARY COOPERATION" and "USSR" (Russian: «ЗА УКРЕПЛЕНИЕ БОЕВОГО СОДРУЖЕСТВА») and (Russian: «СССР»). Two relief laurel branches follow the left and right circumference of the medal passing under the points of the star. At the bottom of the obverse, crossed swords, their hilts below the star, their blades passing under the lower arms of the star and protruding over the laurels to the medal rim. The reverse of the medal is plain.

The medal is secured to a standard Russian pentagonal mount by a ring through the medal suspension loop. The mount is covered by a 24 mm wide silk moiré ribbon in the colours of the flags of the Warsaw Pact countries. The ribbon's coloured stripes alternate from left to right in the following widths: green 4 mm, white 1 mm, red 5.5 mm, yellow 1 mm, black 1 mm, yellow 1 mm, red 5.5 mm, white 1 mm and blue 4 mm.

== Recipients (partial list) ==
The individuals below were all recipients of the Medal "For Strengthening Military Cooperation".

- Polish General and President Wojciech Witold Jaruzelski
- Chuvash cosmonaut Andriyan Grigoryevich Nikolayev
- Major General cosmonaut Pavel Romanovich Popovich
- Marshal of the Soviet Union and Defence Minister Dmitriy Feodorovich Ustinov
- Marshal of Aviation Alexander Ivanovich Pokryshkin
- Cosmonaut Lieutenant General Vladimir Vladimirovich Vasyutin
- Former Mayor of Moscow Yury Mikhaylovich Luzhkov
- Major General cosmonaut Yury Nikolayevich Glazkov
- Marshal of the Soviet Union Sergey Fyodorovich Akhromeyev
- Army General Anatoly Vasiliyevich Kvashnin
- Marshal of the Soviet Union Pavel Fyodorovich Batitsky
- Marshal of the Soviet Union Semyon Konstantinovich Kurkotkin
- Marshal of the Soviet Union Vasily Ivanovich Petrov
- Army General Semion Pavlovich Ivanov
- Army General Sagadat Nurmagambetov
- General Secretary of the Central Committee of the Communist Party of the Soviet Union Leonid Ilyich Brezhnev
- General Secretary of the Central Committee of the Communist Party of the Soviet Union Mikhail Sergeyevich Gorbachev
- Cosmonaut Major General Vladimir Aleksandrovich Shatalov
- Cosmonaut Colonel Yevgeni Vassilyevich Khrunov
- Major General Wolfgang Thonke
- Scientist, statesman and liberal politician Boris Nemtsov
- Chief of Czechoslovakia Civil Defence Colonel Ing. Josef Voldřich
- Vietnamese Chief of General Staff Hoàng Văn Thái
- Vietnamese Major General Hoàng Đan
- Günter Voigt

== See also ==
- Medal Brotherhood in Arms (equivalent medal of the East German military)
- Brotherhood in Arms Medal (equivalent medal of Communist Poland)
- Orders, decorations, and medals of the Soviet Union
- Badges and Decorations of the Soviet Union
- Warsaw Pact
