= Heinz Keßler =

German general and politician (1920–2017)

Army General Heinz Keßler
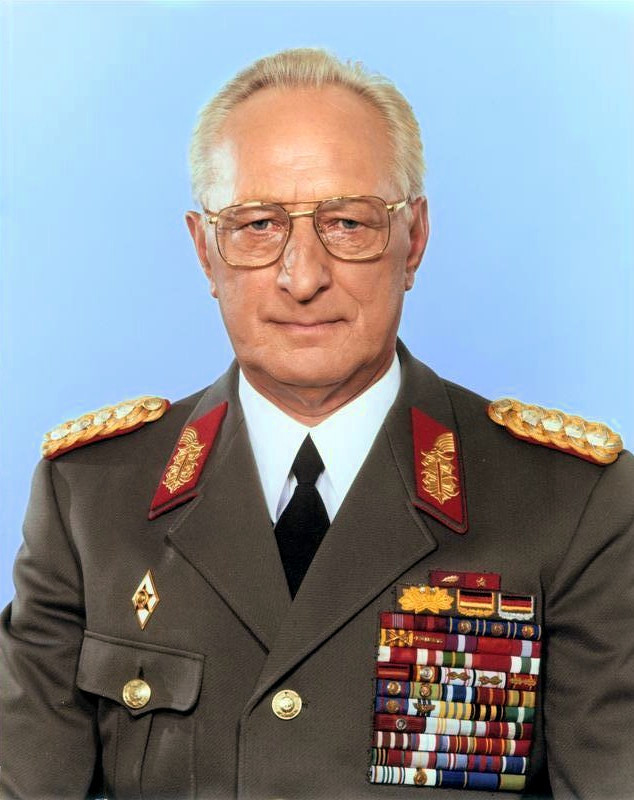
- Keßler in 1988

Minister of National Defense
- In office 3 December 1985 – 18 November 1989
- Chairman of the Council of Ministers: Willi Stoph; Hans Modrow
- Appointed by: Erich Honecker
- Preceded by: Heinz Hoffmann
- Succeeded by: Theodor Hoffmann
National People's Army
Chief of the Political Administration
In office 10 January 1979 – 2 December 1985
Minister	Heinz Hoffmann
Preceded by	Waldemar Verner
Succeeded by	Horst Brünner
Chief of Staff of the National People's Army
In office 15 March 1967 – 10 January 1979
Minister	Heinz Hoffmann
Preceded by	Sigfrid Riedel
Succeeded by	Fritz Streletz
Chief of the Air Forces/Air Defence Command
In office 1 September 1956 – 14 March 1967
Minister	Willi Stoph; Heinz Hoffmann
Preceded by	Heinz-Bernhard Zorn
Succeeded by	Herbert Scheibe
Parliamentary constituencies
Member of the Volkskammer for Bernau, Fürstenwald, Strausberg
In office 30 May 1949 – 11 January 1990
Preceded by	Multi-member district
Succeeded by	Constituency abolished

Personal details
- Born: 26 January 1920 Lauban, Province of Lower Silesia, Free State of Prussia, Weimar Republic (now Lubań, Poland)
- Died: 2 May 2017 (aged 97) Berlin, Germany
- Party: KPD (1945–1946); SED (1946–1989); PDS (1989–1990); KPD (1990) (2009–2017)
- Spouse: Ruth
- Children: 1
- Occupation: Politician; Machinist; Soldier

Military service
- Allegiance: Nazi Germany; Soviet Union; East Germany
- Branch/service: Wehrmacht; Red Army; National People's Army
- Years of service: 1940–1941; 1941–1945; 1950–1989
- Rank: Armeegeneral
- Commands: Commander-in-chief of the Kommando LSK/LV; Ministry of National Defence
- Battles/wars: World War II; Eastern Front; Operation Barbarossa; Warsaw Pact invasion of Czechoslovakia; Angolan Civil War
- Criminal information
- Known for: Incitement to kill German civilians fleeing East Germany
- Status: Served prison sentence 24 January 1990 – April 1990; 26 July 1991 (Note: Keßler was sentenced on 16 September 1993, but had been imprisoned in pre-trial detention from 24 January 1990 to April 1990 and from 26 July 1991 onward. In Germany, pre-trial detention counts towards the eventual time served.) – 29 October 1998, released on parole in 1998 due to poor health
- Conviction: Incitement of Manslaughter (7 counts)
- Penalty: 7½ years imprisonment
- Central institution membership: 1986–1989: Full member, Politburo of the Central Committee; 1946–1989: Full member, Central Committee (Note: Party Executive Committee until 1950); Other offices held: 1967–1989: Member, National Defence Council; 1950–1954: Chairman, Free German Youth in the Volkskammer

Heinz Keßler (26 January 1920 – 2 May 2017) was a German communist politician and military officer in East Germany.

His career in the military started when he was conscripted into the Wehrmacht, the armed forces of Nazi Germany, in World War II. Due to his communist convictions, he deserted the Wehrmacht and fought for the Soviet Union on the Eastern Front. Upon his return to East Germany, he entered service in the National People's Army (Nationale Volksarmee) upon its establishment in 1956. Later, he was Minister of Defense of the GDR with the rank of Armeegeneral, a member of the Politbüro of the Central Committee of the Socialist Unity Party of Germany (SED), and a deputy of the GDR's Volkskammer (parliament).

Convicted for his role in the deaths of defectors along the Berlin wall, he was sentenced to seven and a half years in prison after German reunification, and served his sentence in Hakenfelde Prison. He was released from prison in 1998 after serving only two years.

== Biography ==
=== Early life ===
Kessler was born into a communist family in Lauban, Lower Silesia and was raised in Chemnitz. He joined the Red Young Pioneers, the youth organization of the Communist Party of Germany (KPD), at age 6 and the Young Spartacus League at 10. He later apprenticed as a motor mechanic.

=== Military career ===
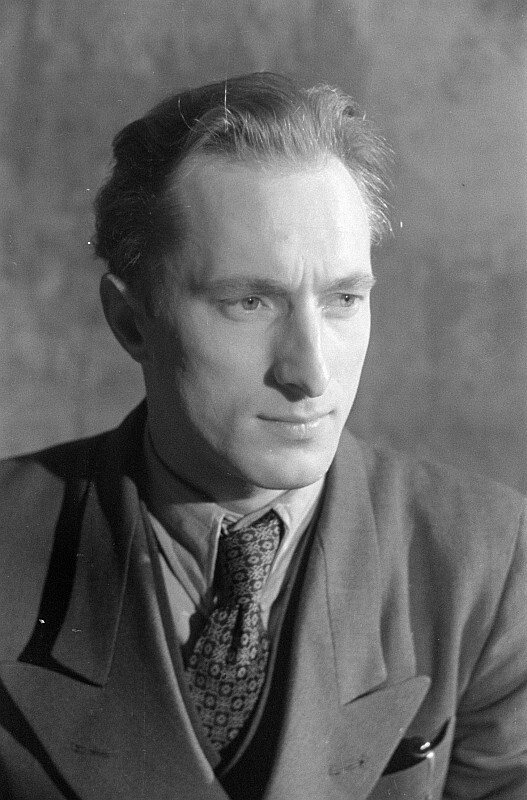
Portrait by Abraham Pisarek, 1946

Drafted into the Wehrmacht in 1940, he deserted and defected to the Soviet Red Army three weeks after the German invasion of the USSR and fought for the Soviet Union until the end of the war. Upon his desertion, he was sentenced to death in absentia by a military tribunal and his mother was arrested and imprisoned in the Ravensbrück concentration camp. He wouldn't see her again until June 1945, shortly after the end of the war, in a reunion that he considered to be "one of the most eventful and beautiful days" of his life.

Upon returning to Germany in 1945, Kessler joined the KPD in the Soviet occupation zone, which merged with the Social Democratic Party (SPD) in the Soviet zone in 1946 to form the SED. Also in 1946, Kessler became a member of the SED Central Committee.

He was appointed Chief of the Air Forces and Air Defense (Luftstreitkräfte/Luftverteidigung) of the NVA in 1956, and as deputy minister of defense in 1957. He became Chief of the NVA Main Staff (Hauptstab – General Staff) in 1967, with the rank of Generaloberst (Colonel General). Simultaneously, he also became a member of the Military Council of the United High Command of the Warsaw Pact.

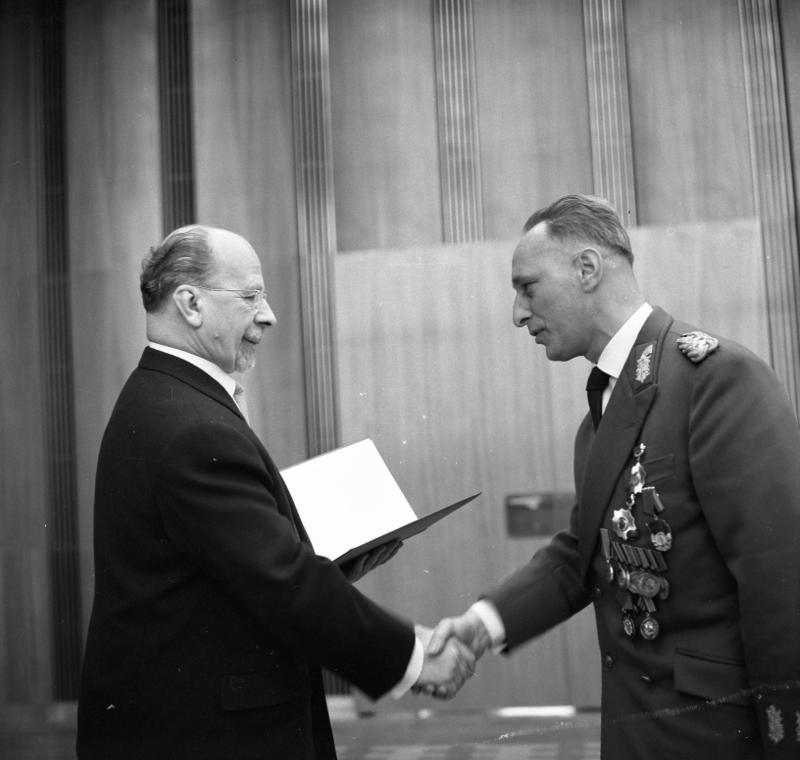
Generalleutnant Keßler (r.) with Walter Ulbricht in 1966

Kessler was promoted from Chief of the Main Political Administration (Chef der Politischen Hauptverwaltung) of the NVA to Defense Minister (with the rank of Armeegeneral) on 3 December 1985 after his predecessor, Armeegeneral Heinz Hoffmann, died of a heart attack.

=== Conviction and imprisonment ===
In 1991, after the Unification of Germany, Kessler was arrested after police received information that Kessler would attempt to flee the country disguised as a Soviet officer. German police blockaded the Sperenberg Airfield to prevent Kessler's escape, but later arrested him in Berlin after changing the lock on his home and informing him that he could retrieve his keys at a local police station.

He was tried in a German court for incitement to commit intentional homicide, for his role in the deaths of people who tried to flee the GDR between 1971 and 1989. On 16 September 1993, Kessler was found guilty of manslaughter and was sentenced to seven and a half years in prison.

Kessler filed an appeal to the European Court of Human Rights, claiming that his actions were in accordance with GDR law and meant to preserve the existence of the GDR. However, his appeal was denied largely on the basis that the GDR's policies violated international human rights.

Kessler served his sentence in Berlin-Hakenfelde prison from November 1996 to October 1998, and was released early.

Kessler was expelled from the Party of Democratic Socialism (PDS) in 1990. In 2009, he joined the German Communist Party (DKP). He was an unsuccessful DKP candidate in the 2011 Berlin state election. Kessler died on 2 May 2017 at the age of 97.
