= Bunker Fuchsbau =

- Fürstenwalde, Brandenburg

Site information
- Type: Military bunker
- Controlled by: East Germany (1965-1990); Germany (1991-1994)
- Open to the public: Yes (by prior arrangement)

Location
- Fürstenwalde, Germany
- Coordinates: 52.32295°N 14.05743°E

Site history
- In use: 1978 – 1994

The Fuchsbau (German: Foxhole) is a military bunker system, located south of the town of Fürstenwalde, Brandenburg, about 55 km (34 mi) east of Berlin.

The bunker served as Zentraler Gefechtsstand 14 (ZGS-14) ("Central Component Headquarters 14") of the East German Air Force Kommando LSK/LV from 1965 until 1990, when the compound became the headquarters of Bundeswehr's 5. Luftwaffendivision. The facilities were shut down in December 1994, when the 5. Luftwaffendivision was disbanded. With 9,000 m^{2} (97,000 sq ft) of floor space, 650 m (2,130 ft) of corridors, and up to 350 personnel, it was one of the largest bunkers in the German Democratic Republic (GDR).

ZGS14
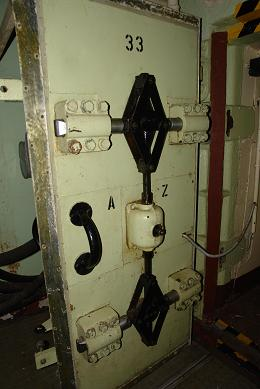
Pressure door in the entrance area

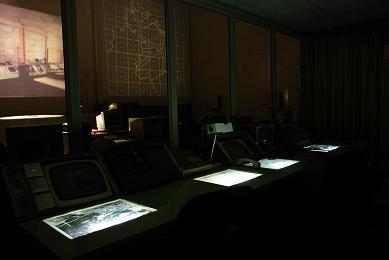
Operations (OPS) with RAP display

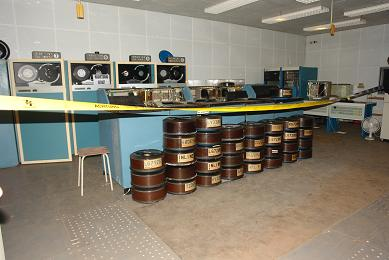
IT System with disk packs in the foreground

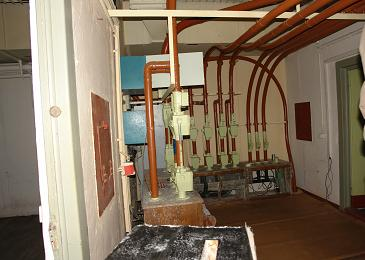
Centre of the mail pipe line system

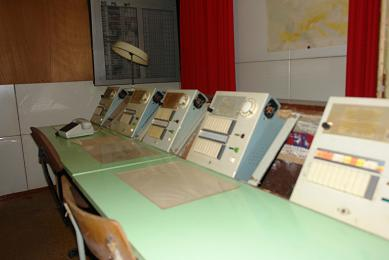
Combat section "Communications and Air Traffic Control"
