= Rolf Berger =

German military officer (1936–2009)

General Rolf Berger
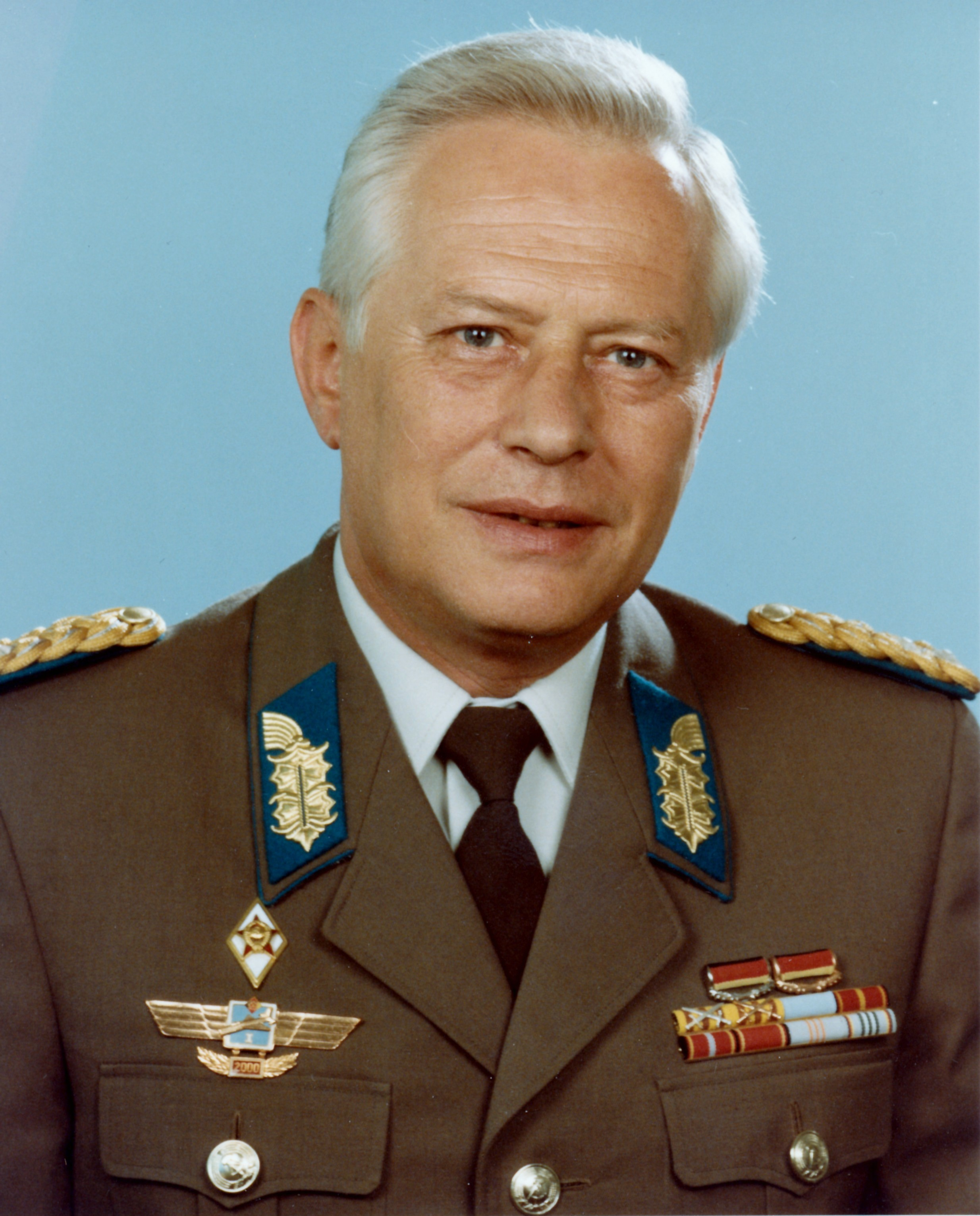
- Rolf Berger in 1986
- Born: 29 December 1936; Leipzig, Gau Saxony, Nazi Germany
- Died: 29 July 2009 (aged 72); Strausberg, Brandenburg, Germany
- Military career
- Allegiance: East Germany
- Branch: Air Forces of the National People's Army
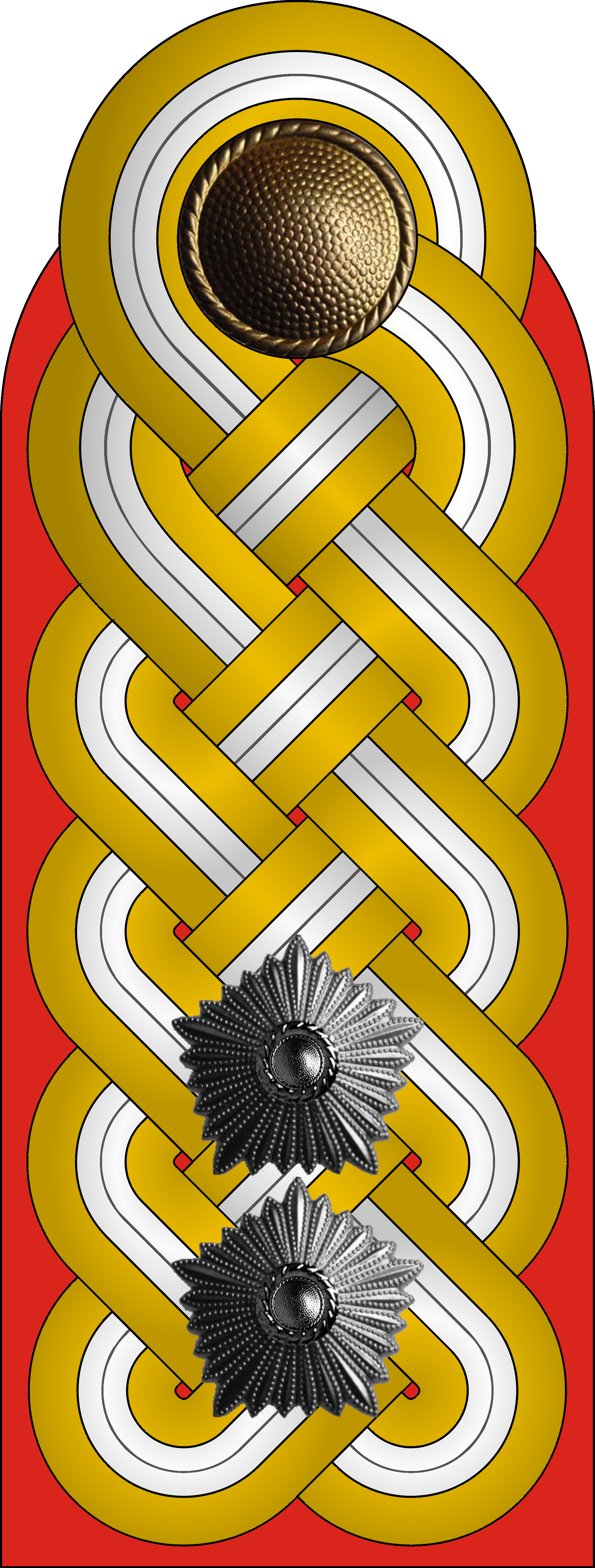
- Rank: Generalleutnant
- Commands: Chief of the Air Forces / Air Defense Command (1989–1990)
- Awards: Patriotic Order of Merit in silver and bronze Meritorious Military Pilot of the German Democratic Republic

Rolf Berger (Leipzig, 29 December 1936 – Strausberg, 29 July 2009) was a German military officer and a Generalleutnant of the East German National People's Army (NVA). He served as the last Chief of the Air Forces / Air Defense Command of the NVA prior to the German reunification, from 1 December 1989 to 2 October 1990.

== Literature ==
- Froh, Klaus; Wenzke, Rüdiger (2000), Die Generale und Admirale der NVA. Ein biographisches Handbuch (in German) (4. ed.), Berlin: Ch. Links, ISBN 3-86153-209-3

Military offices
Preceded by Wolfgang Reinhold	Chief of the Air Forces / Air Defense Command of the National People's Army; 1 December 1989 – 2 October 1990	Position abolished
