= Medal for Faithful Service in the National People's Army =

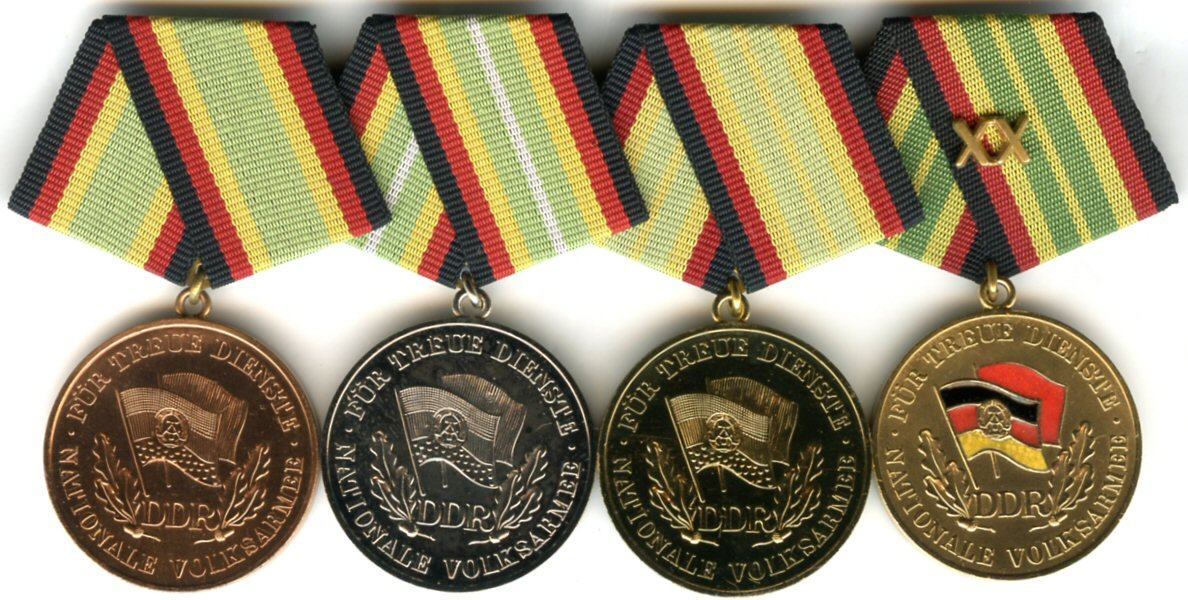
- Medal For Faithful Service the National People's Army - Bronze, 5 years of service
- Type: Four classes order
- Awarded for: "Faithful Service in the National People’s Army"
- Presented by: East Germany
- Status: No longer awarded
- First award: 1956
- Final award: 1990
- Reverse side (Medal - Gold, 20 Years)

Precedence
- Next (higher): Medal ... – Silver for 10 years of service
- Next (lower): nothing

The Medal For Faithful Service in the National People’s Army (German: Medaille für treue Dienste in der Nationalen Volksarmee) was a medal issued in the German Democratic Republic (GDR).

Date of establishment: 1 June 1956 (revised orders were issued on 28 August 1964 and on 15 July 1968).

Four Classes:

- 5 years service (bronze)
- 10 years service (silver)
- 15 years service (gold)
- 20 years service (gold) with colored flags on the medal and Roman numerals XX on the ribbon

Faithful Service Medals with a similar design were issued by Border Guards (Grenztruppen) and Civil Defense (Zivilverteidigung).

Preceding the establishment of the National People’s Army there was a Faithful Service Medal for its predecessor organization the Barracked People's Police (German: Kasernevolkspolizei (KVP) established in 1954).

== Award criteria ==
The medal could be presented for honest conscientious performance of duties in the National People’s Army (Army, Navy or Air Force/Air Defense Force) or other armed organizations of the GDR.

It was presented to:

- Members of the National People’s Army and Stasi.
- Individuals who actively supported the National People’s Army and Stasi.

The award was presented in the name of the Minister of National Defense or Minister of State Security usually on the day of the completion of the specified years of service.

Document / Cash award: Each medal was accompanied by a document/certificate. No cash award is specified.

== Notable recipients ==
- Jeffrey Carney
- Albert Hugo Schuster
- Günter Voigt

== Medal description ==
The medal is suspended from a five sided cloth ribbon which is 48 mm (1.9 in) at the widest point. The medal is 35 mm (1.4 in) in diameter and is silvered and/or gilded bronze (gold medal), or bronze depending on the grade of the medal. Some variations of the medal are 34.7 mm in diameter.

The ribbons for the Faithful Service medals stem from the basic design used for the Bronze medal. The basic ribbon has a wide light green center stripe flanked by three equal width stripes of yellow, red and black, with black being the edge color. The Silver medal has a narrow silver center stripe added, and the 15- and 20-year ribbons have a narrow yellow center stripe. To differentiate the 20-year ribbon from the 15-year ribbon, a gold-plated "XX" device is attached, by means of two straight pins soldered to the back of the device, to both the suspension ribbon and the service ribbon. The Roman numerals are without serifs.

The ribbon bar is 24 mm (just under 1 inch) wide, rectangular and corresponds with the medal ribbon.

The medal was awarded with a certificate and was worn on the left upper chest. Uniform regulations specify when the medal or ribbon bar was worn. Wear of this medal on the ribbon bar was mandatory.

== Medal variations ==
Several distinct variations of each grade of this medal exist. Although established in 1956, the first 10-year medals were not manufactured until 1959; the first 15-year medals in 1960 and the first 20-year medals in 1965. Because the practice of serial numbering medals was discontinued in 1959, only the Faithful Service Medal in bronze exists in a serial numbered version.

According to research by John Standberg the different types are;

20-Year - Gold

- Type 1 - (1965–72) Silver "900", gold-plated, flags on the obverse are enameled. The silver content stamp is below the crossed laurel branches on the reverse.
- Type 2 - (1973–74) Bronze, gold-plated, flags enameled.
- Type 3 - (1974–75) Bronze, gold-plated, flags lacquered over a pebbled finish
- Type 4 - (1975–76) Same, lacquered over a smooth finish.
- Type 5 - (1977–83) Same as type 4, with" -UND-", 34.7 mm in diameter.
- Type 6 - (1983-86) Same as Type 5, 35 mm in diameter.
- Type 7 - (1986-90) Same as Type 6, grain stalks in the NVA emblem are stylized and closed.

15-Year (Gold)

- Type 1 - (1960-63) Silver "900", gold-plated, content stamp on reverse above the intersection of the crossed laurel branches.
- Type 2 - (1964–72) Silver "900", gold-plated, content stamp is below the crossed laurel branches.
- Type 3 - (1973–74) Bronze, gold-plated.
- Type 4 - (1974–76) Bronze, gold-plated with outer ring around State Seal on the GDR flag on the obverse.
- Type 5 - (1975) Same as Type 2, but with outer ring around State Seal on the GDR flag on the obverse.
- Type 6 - (1977–83) Same as type 4, with " -UND-", 34.7 mm in diameter.
- Type 7 - (1983–86) Same as Type 5, 35 mm in diameter.
- Type 8 - (1986–90) Same as Type 6, grain stalks in the NVA emblem are stylized and closed.

10-Year - Silver

- Type 1 - (1959) Silver "900" content stamp on rim, GDR flag on the obverse without the State Seal.
- Type 2 - (1960–61) Same as Type 1, flag on the obverse with State Seal.
- Type 3 - (1962–63) Silver "900" content stamp on reverse above the intersection of the crossed laurel branches.
- Type 4 - (1964–72) Silver "900" content stamp is below the crossed laurel branches.
- Type 5 - (1973–74) Bronze, silver-plated.
- Type 6 - (1974–76) Bronze, silver-plated with outer ring around State Seal on the GDR flag on the obverse.
- Type 7 - (1975) Same as Type 2, but with outer ring around State Seal on the GDR flag on the obverse.
- Type 8 - (1977–83) Same as type 4, with " -UND-", 34.7 mm in diameter.
- Type 9 - (1983–86) Same as Type 5, 35 mm in diameter.
- Type 10 - (1986–90) Same as Type 6, grain stalks in the NVA emblem are stylized and closed.

5-Year - Bronze

- Type 1 - (1956–59) Bronze, with serial number on reverse. GDR flag on the obverse without the State Seal.
- Type 2 - (1960–74) Bronze, no serial number. Flag on the obverse with State Seal.
- Type 3 - (1974–76) Bronze, with outer ring around State Seal on the GDR flag on the obverse.
- Type 4 - (1977–83) Same as type 3, with " -UND-", 34.7 mm in diameter.
- Type 5 - (1983–86) Same as Type 4,35 mm in diameter.
- Type 6 - (1986–90) Same as Type 5, grain stalks in the NVA emblem are stylized and closed.

The first style, used until 1959, has the GDR flag without the State Seal. The second style, used from 1960 until 1974 features the GDR flag with the State Seal. However, there is no outer ring around the seal. The final variety, used from 1974 until 1990 features a ring around the State Seal in the GDR flag. The 20 year medal also has three distinctly different obverse designs. The first type featured colored enameled flags. The second type featured colored lacquer applied over a pebbled finish on the flags. The third type was similar to the second except that the metal finish under the lacquer is smooth.

== See also ==
- Awards and decorations of East Germany
- National People's Army
