= Brotherhood in Arms Medal =

Medal “Brotherhood in Arms" of the NPA of the GDR
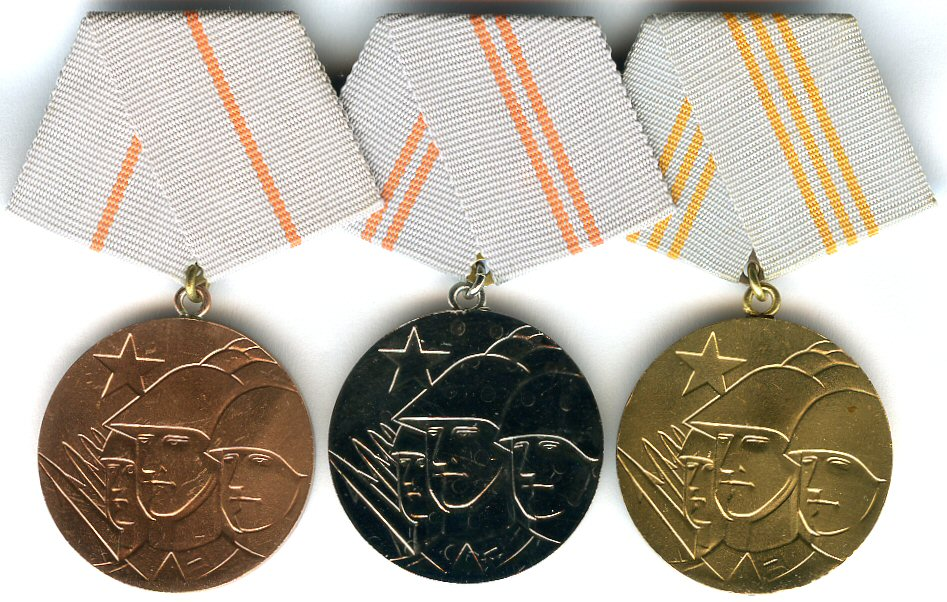
- Medals – All 3 classes.
- Type: Three class medal
- Awarded for: Merit in strengthening the brotherhood of arms
- Presented by: East Germany
- Eligibility: East German military personnel, members of the Stasi, or foreign allied civilian or military personnel
- Status: No longer awarded
- First award: 17 February 1966
- Final award: 1990
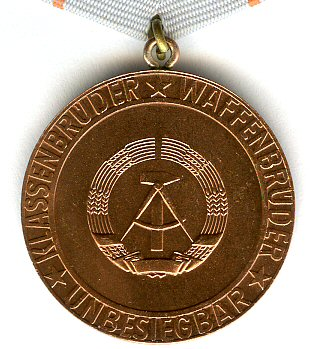
- Reverse of the Bronze level

The Medal Brotherhood in Arms of the National People’s Army (German: Medaille der Waffenbrüderschaft) was a medal issued in the German Democratic Republic (GDR).

Day of establishment: 17 February 1966.

== Classes ==
The medal was granted in three classes:

- – Bronze
- – Silver
- – Gold

== Award criteria ==
The medal could be presented for strengthening of the co-operation and brotherhood in arms to the armed forces of the Warsaw Pact. It was presented to:

- Soldiers and civil employees of the National People’s Army (Army, Navy or Air Force/Air Defense Force)
- Members of the Stasi
- Members of the armed forces of other Warsaw Pact countries
- Individuals of friendly socialist countries

It was presented to:

The award was presented in the name of the Minister of National Defense or Minister of State Security usually on the March 1, or October 7.

Document / Cash award: Each medal was accompanied by a document/certificate and a specific cash award.

== Medal description ==
The medal is suspended from a five sided cloth ribbon which is 48 mm (1.9 in) at the widest point. The medal is 35 mm (1.4 in) in diameter and is silvered and/or gilded bronze (gold medal), or bronze depending on the grade of the medal.

The ribbon bar is 24 mm (just under 1 inch) wide, rectangular and corresponds with the medal ribbon.

The medal was awarded with a certificate and was worn on the left upper chest. Uniform regulations specify when the medal or ribbon bar was worn. Wear of this medal on the ribbon bar was mandatory.

The reverse of the medal, used from 1966 until 1990, features a ring around the State Seal in the GDR flag. чФМЬ

== Notable recipients ==
- Florian Siwicki (Gold medal recipient)- Polish People's Army general, 5th Minister of National Defence in 1983-1989 under the Polish People's Republic, 1st Minister of National Defence under the Third Polish Republic in 1989-1990

== See also ==
- Medal "For Strengthening of Brotherhood in Arms" equivalent Soviet medal
- Brotherhood in Arms Medal (equivalent medal of Communist Poland)
- Awards and decorations of East Germany
- National People's Army
