= Waldsieversdorf =

- Municipality
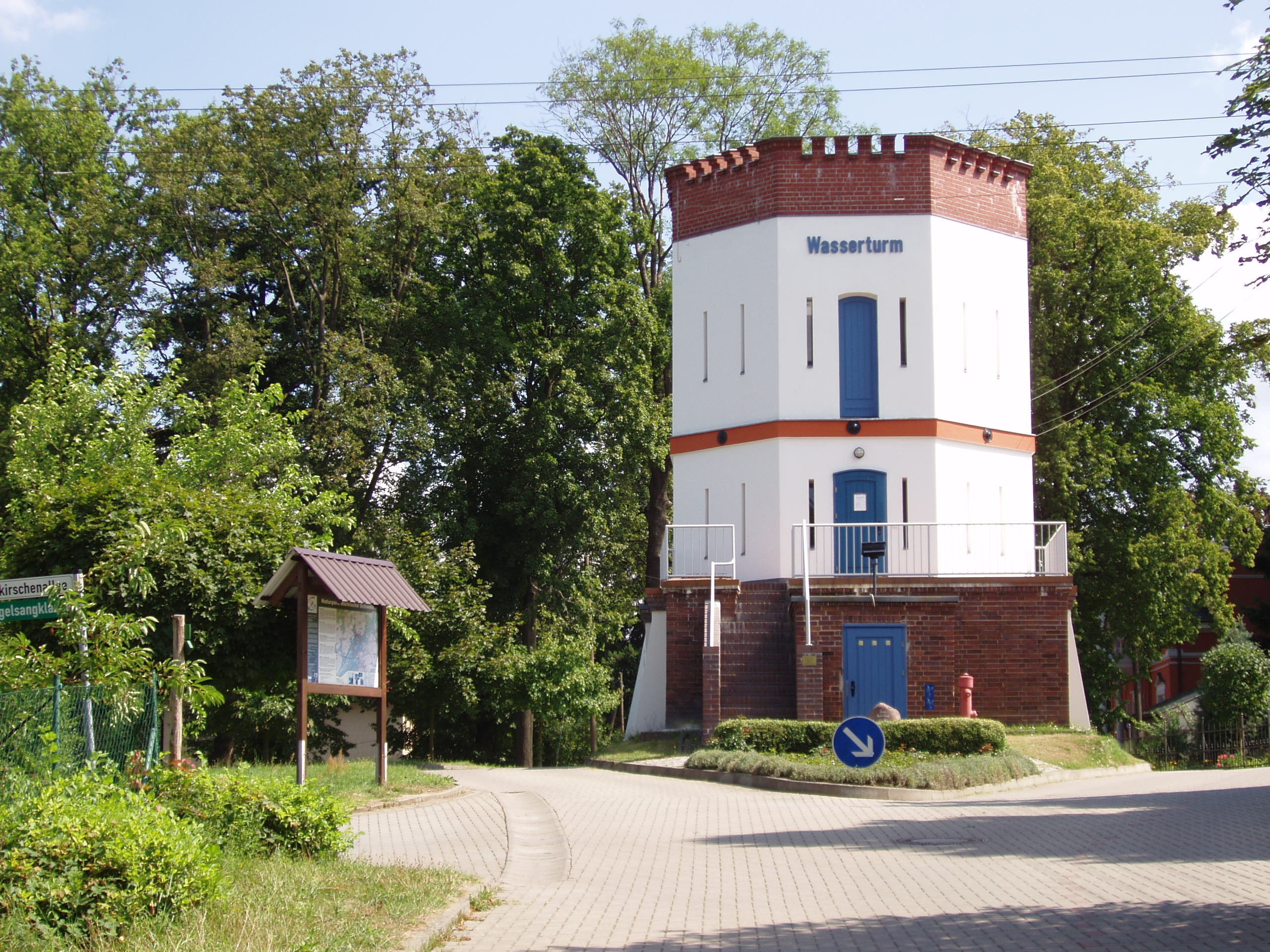

- Coat of arms

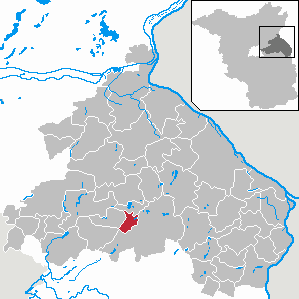
- Location of Waldsieversdorf within Märkisch-Oderland district
- Interactive map of Waldsieversdorf
- Location within Germany Location within Brandenburg
- Coordinates: 52°32′36″N 14°04′20″E
- Country: Germany
- State: Brandenburg
- District: Märkisch-Oderland
- Municipal assoc.: Märkische Schweiz

Government
  - Mayor (2024–29): Rainer Bertram

Area
  - Total: 15.61 km^{2} (6.03 sq mi)
- Elevation: 42 m (138 ft)

Population (2025-12-31)
  - Total: 864
  - Density: 55.3/km^{2} (143/sq mi)
- Time zone: UTC+01:00 (CET)
  - Summer (DST): UTC+02:00 (CEST)
- Postal codes: 15377
- Dialling codes: 033433
- Vehicle registration: MOL
- Website: www.waldsieversdorf.info

Waldsieversdorf is a municipality in the district Märkisch-Oderland of Brandenburg (a Land of the Federal Republic of Germany). As a government-recognized health and holiday resort, Waldsieversdorf is a part of the administrative division Amt Märkische Schweiz, of which Buckow is the seat of regional administration.

== Geography ==
Waldsieversdorf is located in the middle of the Märkische Schweiz Nature Park almost two miles from the small town of Buckow. Because of the natural forest and lakes affluence it's a favourite place for excursions. Close to the place centre there is the lake Grosser Däbersee, a perfect place for swimming, fishing and boating. The municipality is flown through by the river Stobber.

== History ==
The territory of Märkische Schweiz was already populated by the Teutons at the Bronze Age. This population emigrated in the 5th century. From 7th to 9th century there was a prehistoric fortification (de. Volksburg) the so-called “Schwedenschanze” of the Slavic tribes, who settled at the end of the 6th century over there. In 1253 villam Sifiridisdorp and Buckow were called for the first time in a bill of sale signed by the Archbishop of Magdeburg. In 1432 the village was burned to the ground by the Hussites on their campaign to Bernau. At the Thirty Years' War the Wüste Sieversdorf was pillaged by the Imperial Croatian Troops.

In 1889 Ferdinand Kindermann acquired the so-called Priest Mill (de. Priestermühle) in Wüste Sieversdorf together with 250 acre of soil. From 1895 there came into being a high-class suburb settlement, which has been connected with the small towns Müncheberg and Buckow by a local railway since 1897. In 1907 the place was finally renamed to Waldsieversdorf.

Until 1993 the Fernmeldeabteilung 14, a signal regiment-sized unit of the Bundeswehr was stationed in Waldsieversdorf at Rotes Luch (de).

== Demography ==
Development of population since 1875 within the current boundaries (Blue line: Population; Dotted line: Comparison to population development of Brandenburg state; Grey background: Time of Nazi rule; Red background: Time of communist rule)

Waldsieversdorf: Population development
within the current boundaries (2013)

| Year | Pop. | ±% p.a. |
|---|---|---|
| 1875 | 59 | — |
| 1890 | 65 | +0.65% |
| 1910 | 378 | +9.20% |
| 1925 | 678 | +3.97% |
| 1933 | 583 | −1.87% |
| 1939 | 776 | +4.88% |
| 1946 | 830 | +0.97% |
| 1950 | 1,079 | +6.78% |
| 1964 | 1,144 | +0.42% |
| 1971 | 1,060 | −1.08% |
| 1981 | 1,095 | +0.33% |
| 1985 | 1,067 | −0.65% |
| 1989 | 1,094 | +0.63% |
| 1990 | 1,042 | −4.75% |
| 1991 | 1,041 | −0.10% |
| 1992 | 1,117 | +7.30% |
| 1993 | 1,050 | −6.00% |
| 1994 | 1,000 | −4.76% |
| 1995 | 1,075 | +7.50% |
| 1996 | 1,253 | +16.56% |

| Year | Pop. | ±% p.a. |
|---|---|---|
| 1997 | 1,129 | −9.90% |
| 1998 | 1,137 | +0.71% |
| 1999 | 934 | −17.85% |
| 2000 | 944 | +1.07% |
| 2001 | 913 | −3.28% |
| 2002 | 931 | +1.97% |
| 2003 | 1,163 | +24.92% |
| 2004 | 1,133 | −2.58% |
| 2005 | 1,254 | +10.68% |
| 2006 | 1,179 | −5.98% |
| 2007 | 929 | −21.20% |
| 2008 | 920 | −0.97% |
| 2009 | 898 | −2.39% |
| 2010 | 921 | +2.56% |
| 2011 | 840 | −8.79% |
| 2012 | 843 | +0.36% |
| 2013 | 814 | −3.44% |
| 2014 | 823 | +1.11% |
| 2015 | 819 | −0.49% |
| 2016 | 809 | −1.22% |

== Politics ==
=== Municipal council ===
The municipal council of Waldsieversdorf consists of 10 councillors (lady councillors) including the mayor (lady mayor).

Municipal council
| Year of elections | voter association: Non-party Citizen (de:WG Parteilose Bürger) | Single applicants | Total |
| 2008 | 4 | 6 | 10 mandates |

(As to September 18, 2008.)

=== Heraldic ===
The Waldsieversdorf Coat of arms was approved on August 18, 1995.

=== Flag ===
The municipal bears a red-white-read stripped flag with the municipal coat put on.

== Culture and places of interest ==
All historical buildings of Waldsieversdorf are officially registered in a local historical building list. This listing is in line with the records of the historical monument catalogue of Brandenburg.

=== Historical monuments ===
- The memorial to the Victims of Wars on the street corner Dahmsdorfer-/Geschwister-Scholl-Strasse, originally erected in memory of the Victims of Fascism, but re-devoted in 1993/94.
- The Thälmann Memorial Garden, a triangular area located at the road junction where the Wilhelm Pieck-Strasse joins the Dahmsdorfer Strasse, in memory of the workers' politician Ernst Thälmann who was murdered in KZ Buchenwald (August 1944). Bust and inscription had been removed in 1990.

=== Periodical events ===
The most famous event is the Hunters’ Festival (de. Jägerfest) to be organized by the municipality. Since it was celebrated for the first time in 1977, it more and more attracts an increasing number of visitors. Annually this Festival takes place in July at the last weekend from Tuesday to Sunday.
