= Kommando LSK/LV =

Coordinates: 52°31′37.8″N 13°49′53″E

Air Forces/Air Defence Command (Kdo LSK/LV)
- Kommando Luftstreitkräfte/Luftverteidigung — XXXX —
- Troop Colours of the National People's Army
- Active: 1 March 1956 – 2 October 1990
- Disbanded: 2 October 1990
- Country: East Germany
- Allegiance: National Defence Council
- Branch: Air Forces
- Type: Formation
- Role: Air Force Command
- Size: c. 1,200 military people and 400 civilians
- Part of: National People's Army
- Garrison/HQ: Strausberg
- Website: Kdo. LSK/LV

Insignia
- Aircraft Roundel

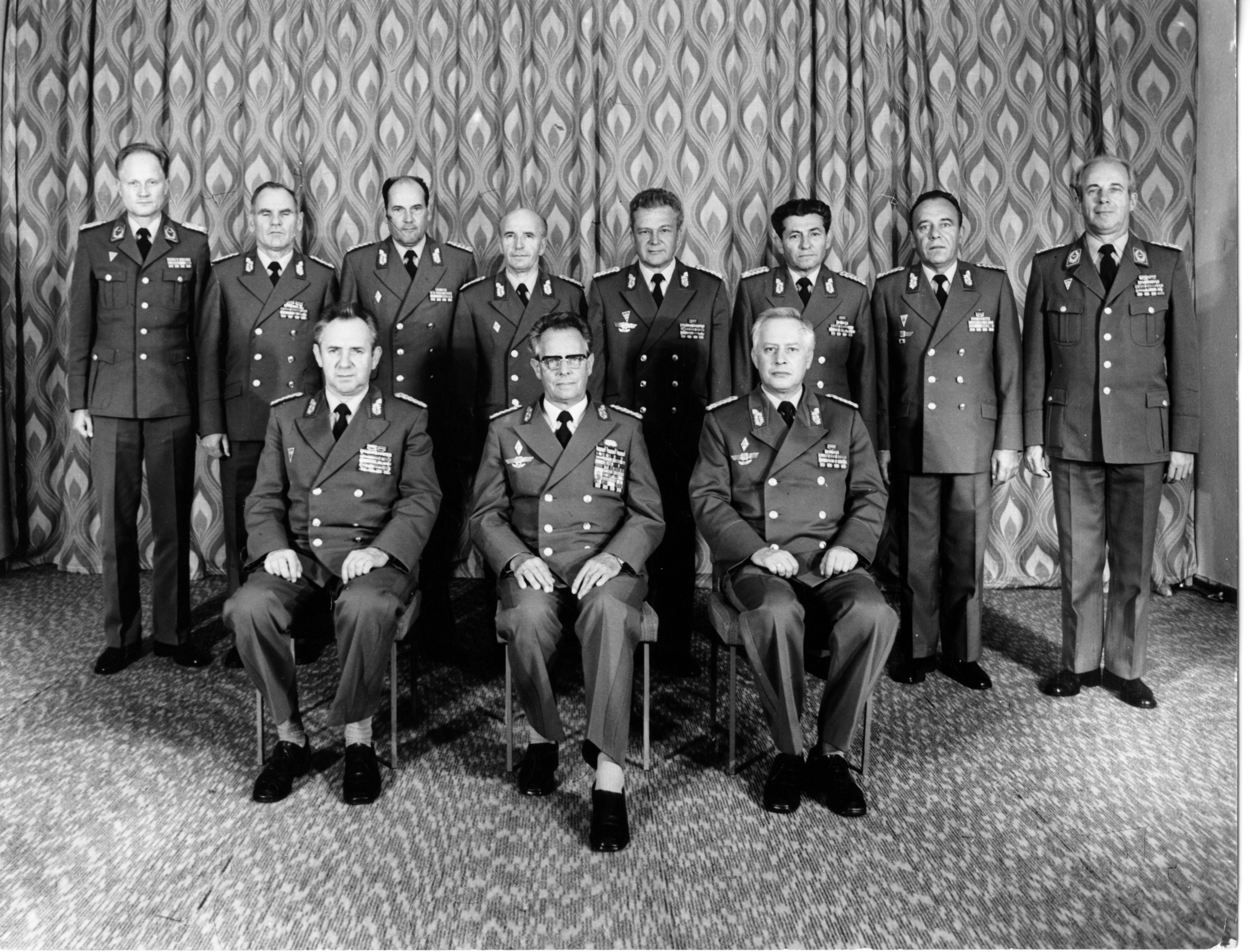
Military committee of the Air Force/Air Defence’s Command of the GDR National People’s Army in 1986. Front row, from left.: Alfred Vogel, Wolfgang Reinhold, Rolf Berger. Back row, from left: M. Reifgerste, Ehrenfried Ullmann, Walter Lobner, Heinz Trautsch, Klaus-Jürgen Baarß, Manfred Merkel, Erhard Telle, H. Fritsch.

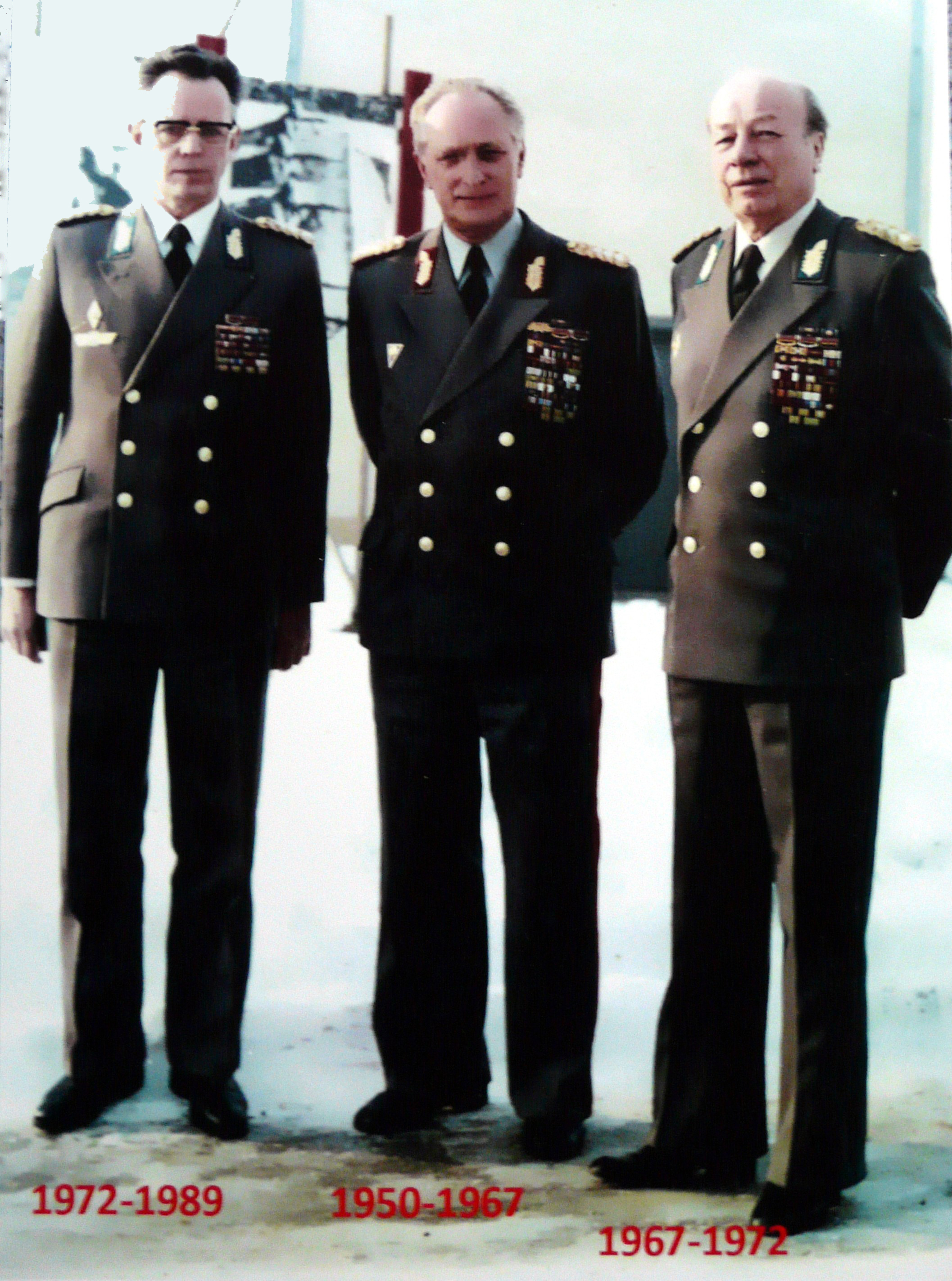
Three commanding generals of the GDR National People’s Army Air Force/Air Defence. (l.t.r.: W.Reinhold, H.Kessler, Herbert Scheibe)

The Kommando Luftstreitkräfte/Luftverteidigung (Kdo LSK/LV) was the Air Force Staff - and simultaneously the Air Force Command of the National People's Army (NPA), the Air Force of the former German Democratic Republic.

The main task of the Kdo LSK/LV was to provide Command, Control and Communications (C3) to the military branch as the whole, as well as to the subordinated division-sized specified commands, groups, organizations, and units of the NVA's Air Force. Under deployment conditions, and in line with the situation awareness C3 had to be executed from the Main Air Force Operations Center, the so-called Zentraler Gefechtsstand 14 (ZGS-14) in Fürstenwalde, the Rear Operations Center (Rückwärtige Führungsstaffel - RFS) in Beeskow (Ranzig), or the Interim Operations Center (Hilfsführungsstelle - HFS) in Strausberg (Eggersdorf).

The Kdo LSK/LV was established in 1950, and was disbanded together with the NVA in 1990. Its legal successor was the 5. Luftwaffendivision of the Bundeswehr.

== Command and organisation ==
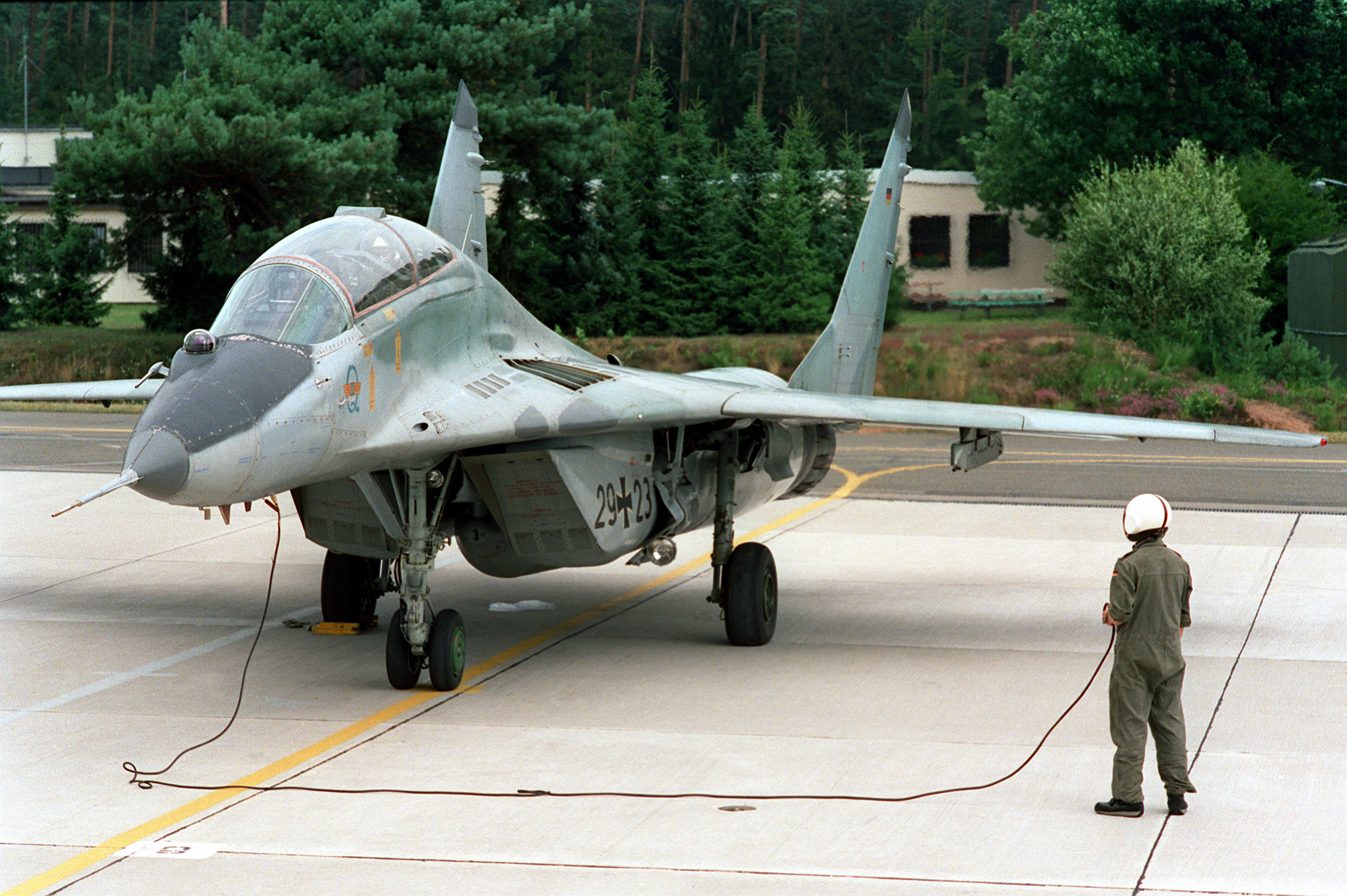
Luftwaffe MiG-29UB

=== Commanding generals of the Kdo LSK/LV NVA ===
Military rank, name	Period of service	Remark
Colonel Heinz Keßler	1950–1952	after Volkspolizei Luft
Major General Heinz Keßler	1952−1955	after Verwaltung Aeroklubs
Major General Heinz-Bernhard Zorn	1956–1957	after Verwaltung der LSK
Colonel Gerhard Bauer	1956–1957	after Verwaltung der LV
Colonel General Heinz Keßler	1957–1967	Kommando LSK/LV
Lieutenant General Herbert Scheibe	1967–1972	Kommando LSK/LV
Colonel General Wolfgang Reinhold	1972–1989	Kommando LSK/LV
Lieutenant General Rolf Berger	1989–1990	Kommando LSK/LV

=== Organisation ===
The command was composed by the following establishment:

- Deputy Minister and Commander-in-chief LSK/LV (3 star level) with the chief's office, flight planning and military advisor
- Deputy of the Commander LSK/LV (DC LSK/LV) and Chief of the Political Division (2 star level) with
- Three branches including Chief Party Control Commission (de: PKK), Central Party Leadership (de: ZPL), Spec-Propaganda, and Political Branch of the Kdo LSK/LV
- DC LSK/LV and Chief of Staff (CS) (2 star level) with
- Assistant Chief Of Staff (ACOS) and A3 (1 star level) with
  - Branch 1 (4 sections; section EW, Counter Measures (de: GTAG), 3 radio electronic control vehicles; section military topography)
  - Branch 2
  - Combat Operations Center (de: GFZ)
- ACOS and Chief and Automation (de: GSA) (1 star level) with
  - Branch Operations Centres (de: GS]
  - Branch C2 Mechanisation and Automation, IT (de: MAT DV)
  - Operations Training and Education Center (de: OTAZ)
- ACOS and Chief General Tasks with
  - Staff company, guard company and vehicle company
- Chief A1 with PTA and WTA
- Chief Organization/Replenishment with
  - Branch Organization
  - Branch Replenishment
  - Chief RECON
  - Chief General-Military Training and Schools (de: AMAS)
  - Chief A6 and ATC with
    - Branches 1, 2 and 8th section
  - Chief Mil Scientific (de: MiWi)
  - Chief Chemical Services (de: CD)
- DC LSK/LV and Chief Military - and Transport Aviation (de. MTFK) (2 star level) with
  - Chief Aviation Procurement and Maintenance (de: FID) (1 star level)
  - Chief Front Aviation
  - Chief Transport Aviation
  - Chief Helicopter
  - Search and Rescue (SAR), senior air traffic controller, parachute service
- DC LSK/LV and Chief Air Defence (2 star level) with
  - Chief SAM Forces (de. FRT)
  - Chief Fighter Air Craft Aviation (de: JFK)
- DC LSK/LV and Chief A4 (de. RD) (2 star level) with
  - AC and CS A4 (1 Star level)
  - Chief Medical Service
  - Chief Combat Engineer Service
  - Chief Military Architecture Accommodation (de: MBU)
  - Chief Military Transport (de: MTW)
  - Chief Closing and Equipment (de: BA)
- Chief Tactical Air Command and Control Service (TACCS) (de. FuTT) (1 star level) with
  - Chief Engineering TACCS

Safeguarding, counterintelligence, prevention of anti-state agitation
Administration 2000: - This was the name for the Main Division I of the Stasi (Ministry for State Security), responsible for the National People's Army and the Border Troops

== Subordination ==
A decisive number of division-sized specified commands, groups, organizations, units and military formations have been under direct control of the Kommando LSK/LV.

=== Divisions and division-sized specified commands ===
- Führungsorgan Front- u. Militärtransportfliegerkräfte (FO FMTFK)
- 1. Luftverteidigungsdivision (1. LVD)
- 3. LVD

=== Groups, organizations, units and military formations ===
Units directly subordinated to the Kommando LSK/LV normally had numbers ending at 4. The first unit was -14, a second unit of the same kind was -24 etc.

- Amt für Luftraumkoordinierung (ALK), Berlin
- Auswerte-, Rechen- und Informationsgruppe 14 (ARIG-14), Fürstenwalde
- Chemische Werkstatt und Lager 14 (ChWL-14), Storkow, Brandenburg
- Druckerei 14, Strausberg
- Fla-Raketenwerkstatt und -lager 14 (FRWL-14), Pinnow, Brandenburg
- Fliegertechnisches Lager 14 (FTL-14), Krugau
- Flugplatz-Pionierbataillon 14 (FPiB-14) „Franz Dahlem“, Potsdam
- Flugzeugreparaturwerkstatt 14 (FRW-14), Cottbus
- Flugzeugreparaturwerkstatt 24 (FRW-24), Kamenz
- Institut für Luftfahrtmedizin (IfLM), Königsbrück
- Kfz-Instandsetzungswerkstatt 14 (KfzIW-14), Kamenz
- Kfz-Kompanie 14 (KfzK-14), Strausberg
- Kfz-Transportkompanie 34 (KfzTK-14), Krugau
- Kompanie Chemische Abwehr 14 (KChA-14), Waldsieversdorf
- Konditionsheim, Rugiswalde
- Konditionszentrum 14, Benneckenstein
- Labor für Treib- und Schmierstoffe 14, Cottbus
- Lazarett LSK/LV, Cottbus
- Militärtechnische Schule der Luftstreitkräfte/Luftverteidigung (MTS LSK/LV) „Harry Kuhn“ (Air and Air Defense Forces Technical Academy "Harry Kuhn"), Bad Düben
- Nachrichtenregiment 14 (NR-14) „Harro Schulze-Boysen“, Waldsieversdorf
- Nachrichten- und Flugsicherungs-Werkstatt und Lager 14 (NFWL-14), Cottbus
- Offiziershochschule für Militärflieger „Otto Lilienthal", Bautzen
  - Fliegerausbildungsgeschwader 15 (FAG-15) „Heinz Kapelle“, Rothenburg/Oberlausitz
    - Fliegertechnisches Bataillon 15 (FTB-15), Rothenburg
    - Nachrichten- und Flugsicherungsbataillon 15 (NFB-15), Rothenburg
  - Fliegerausbildungsgeschwader 25 (FAG-25) „Leander Ratz“, Bautzen
    - Fliegertechnisches Bataillon 25 (FTB-25), Bautzen
    - Nachrichten- und Flugsicherungsbataillon 25 (NFB-25), Bautzen
  - Transportfliegerausbildungsstaffel 45 (TAS-45), Kamenz
    - Fliegertechnisches Bataillon 45 (FTB-45), Kamenz
  - Hubschrauberausbildungsgeschwader 35 (HAG-35) „Lambert Horn“, Brandenburg-Briest
    - Fliegertechnisches Bataillon 35 (FTB-35), Brandenburg-Briest
- Offiziershochschule der Luftstreitkräfte/Luftverteidigung „Franz Mehring" (Air and Air Defense Forces Officer Cadet School), Kamenz
  - Musikkorps der OHS der LSK/LV, Kamenz
- Pionierbataillon 24 (PiB-24) „Ludwig Renn“, Potsdam
- Pionierwerkstatt und -lager 14 (PiWL-14), Briest
- Rechenzentrale 14 (RZ-14), Strausberg
- Stabsmusikkorps der LSK/LV, Cottbus
- Technisches Versorgungslager 34 (TVL-34), Doberlug-Kirchhain
- Treib- und Schmierstofflager 14 (TSL-14), Hähnichen
- Treib- und Schmierstofflager 24 (TSL-24), Lohmen
- Treib- und Schmierstofflager 34 (TSL-34), Utzedel
- Treib- und Schmierstofflager 44 (TSL-44), Niederlehme
- Topographisches Lager, Stallberg
- Transportfliegergeschwader 44 (TG-44) „Arthur Pieck“, Diepensee/Marxwalde
  - Fliegertechnisches Bataillon 44 (FTB-44), Marxwalde
- Verbindungsfliegerstaffel 14 (VS-14), Strausberg
  - Fliegertechnische Kompanie 14 (FTK-14), Strausberg
- Vereinigte Hauptzentrale 14 (VHZ-14), Wünsdorf
- Versorgungslager 14 (VL-14), Görlitz
- Waffenwerkstatt und Lager 14, Bautzen
- Wartungseinheit 14 (WE-14), Ranzig
- Zentraler Gefechtsstand 14 (ZGS-14), Fürstenwalde/Spree
