= Distinguished Service Medal of the National People's Army =

"Distinguished Service Medal of the NPA"
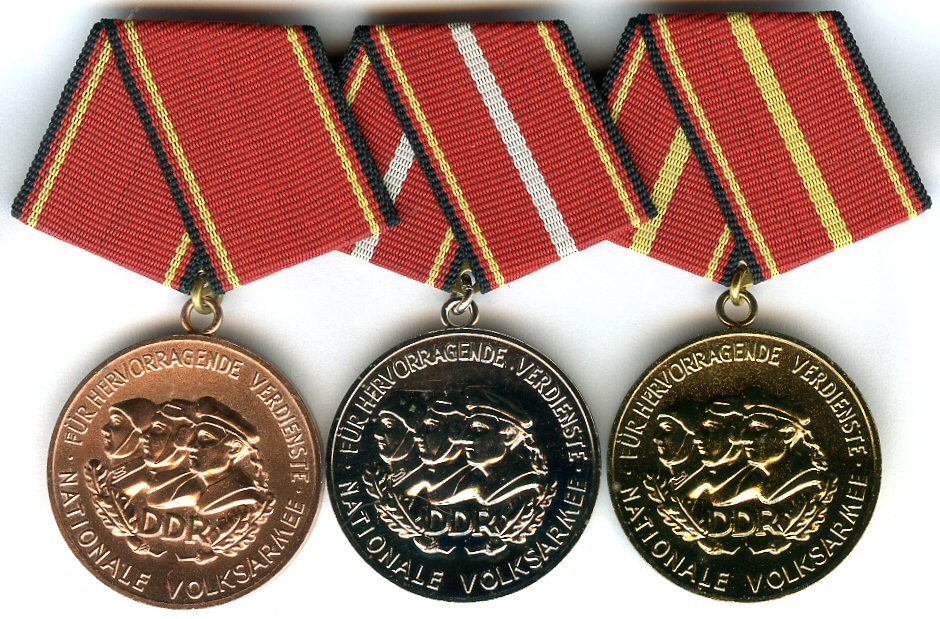
- Type: Three class order
- Awarded for: "Outstanding merit and personal readiness in support of the increase of combat capability and combat readiness"
- Presented by: East Germany
- Status: No longer awarded
- First award: June 1, 1956
- Final award: 1990

The Distinguished Service Medal of the National People's Army, or "Medal of Merit of the National People's Army", (German: Verdienstmedaille der Nationalen Volksarmee) was a medal issued in the German Democratic Republic (GDR).

Established on June 1, 1956 in three levels, Gold, Silver and Bronze, it was awarded for outstanding merit and personal readiness in support of the increase of combat capability and combat readiness of the National People's Army (NPA).

Awarded in the name of the Minister for National Defense, it was presented on the "National People's Army Day", 1 March, on the Day of the Republic, 7 October, or immediately after the achievement.

== Classes ==
The medal was granted in three classes: bronze, silver, and gold. The ribbon bars are depicted below.

Bronze

Silver

Gold

== Award criteria ==
The medal was presented to:

People’s Army of the GDR, here Officers:

1 governmental‘s decorations, ribbon bares (orders, honorary titles, medals);
2 nongovernmental‘s prizes;
3 non-state‘s awards;
4 Graduate badge.

- Members of the -
  - Landstreitkräfte (Army)
  - Volksmarine (Navy)
  - Luftstreitkräfte (Air Forces)
  - Ministerium für Staatssicherheit (MfS / Ministry for State Security), commonly known as the Stasi (including Stasi agents and informers)
- Individuals in civil service
- Individuals employed by the National People's Army
- Individuals who are not members of the National People's Army
- Collectives with membership of any of the previously mentioned groups

By regulation all three levels could be awarded to any rank in the armed forces. But in practice, the gold medal was usually reserved to field grade and general officers, while the silver and bronze grades were more commonly awarded to noncommissioned officers (NCOs) and company grade officers.

An individual of any rank who had earned the Best Soldier badge (German: Bestenabzeichen) for seven consecutive years was eligible for the bronze medal, for nine years the silver medal and twelve years the gold medal.

== Medal description ==
The medal was designed by the Berlin graphic artist Paul Gensch. It is round and either bronze colored (Bronze), silvered (Silver) or gilded (Gold) and has a diameter of 35 mm (1.4 inches). On the front are profiles of the busts of a 1950s era sailor, airman, and soldier representing the nation's Land, Air, and Naval forces, under which is spelled out "DDR". On each side of this are three oak leaves with an acorn. The words FÜR HERVORRAGENDE VERDIENSTE (FOR OUTSTANDING MERIT) form the upper part of the medal, the lower part contain the words NATIONALE VOLKSARMEE (NATIONAL PEOPLE'S ARMY).

On the reverse side are the state coat of arms of East Germany, surrounded with the words FÜR DEN SCHUTZ DER ARBEITER- UND-BAUERN- MACHT (FOR THE PROTECTION OF THE WORKERS-AND-FARMERS-POWER) surrounded by two branches of laurel.

The medal is suspended from a five sided cloth ribbon which is 48 mm (1.9 inches) at the widest point. The ribbon is red with black narrow edge stripes and a narrow yellow stripe 1 mm (1/32 inch) from the black edge stripe. The Silver medal is suspended from the same basic ribbon but has the addition of a 3 mm (just over 3/32 inch) wide center stripe of silver/white. On the Gold medal ribbon the center stripe is gold/yellow.

The ribbon bar is 24 mm (just under 1 inch) wide, rectangular and corresponds with the medal ribbon.

The medal was awarded with a certificate and financial allowance and was worn on the left upper chest.

Certificate - Distinguished Service Medal of the National People's Army - Silver, presented to Stasi Captain

== Medal variations ==
Several distinct variations of each grade of this medal exist. According to research by John Standberg the different types are:

=== Gold ===
- 1st Type (1956–57) - 900 Silver, gold plated, content stamp on rim at 6 o'clock, serial numbered at 12 o'clock on reverse. Obverse has dots separating inscriptions
- 2nd Type (1958–59) Same as Type 1, without dots
- 3rd Type (1959–60) Same as Type 2, without serial number
- 4th Type (1960–72) 900 Silver, gold plated, content stamp below the branches on the reverse at 6 o'clock, no serial number Obverse has dots.
- 5th Type (1973–76) Same as Type 4, bronze, gold plated.
- 6th Type (1975) Same as Type 4, "9" in content stamp is distinctly different.
- 7th Type (1977–83) Same as Type 5, with "-UND-", 34.7 mm in diameter
- 8th Type (1983–86) Same as Type 7,35 mm in diameter
- 9th Type (1986–90) Same as Type 8, grain stalks in the NV A emblem are stylized and closed

=== Silver ===
- 1st Type (1956–57) 900 Silver, gold plated, content stamp on rim at 6 o'clock, serial numbered at 12 o'clock on reverse. Obverse has dots separating inscriptions
- 2nd Type (1958–59) Same as Type 1, without dots
- 3rd Type (1959–60) Same as Type 2, without serial number
- 4th Type (1960–73) 900 Silver, gold plated, content stamp below the branches on the reverse at 6 o'clock, no serial number Obverse has dots.
- 5th Type (1973–76) Same as Type 4, bronze, gold plated.
- 6th Type (1975) Same as Type 4, "9" in content stamp is distinctly different.
- 7th Type (1977–83) Same as Type 5, with 11 -UND-", 34.7 mm in diameter
- 8th Type (1983-86) Same as Type 7, 35 mrn in diameter
- 9th Type (1986-90) Same as Type 8, grain stalks in the NVA emblem are stylized and closed

=== Bronze ===
- 1st Type (1956-57) Serial numbered at 12 o’clock on reverse. Obverse has dots separating inscription.
- 2nd Type (1958-59) Same as Type 1, without dots.
- 3rd Type (1959-60) Same as Type 2, without serial number
- 4th Type (1960-76) Same as Type 1, without serial number
- 5th Type (1977-83) Same as Type 4, with "-UND-", 34.7 mm
- 6th Type (1983–86) Same as Type 5, 35 mm in diameter
- 7th Type (1986–90) Same as Type 6, grain stalks in the NVA emblem are stylized and closed

== Well known recipients ==
- Gold - Karl-Eduard von Schnitzler famous for his reporting for Der schwarze Kanal.
- Bronze - Vladimir Putin awarded in 1988 by Stasi chief Erich Mielke for his service as a KGB agent in Dresden and Leipzig.

== See also ==
- Awards and decorations of East Germany
- National People's Army
