= Taktisches Luftwaffengeschwader 73 =

Coordinates: 53°55′N 12°20′E

Tactical Air Force Wing 73
- Taktisches Luftwaffengeschwader 73 "Steinhoff"
- Active: 1 April 1959–present
- Country: Germany
- Branch: German Air Force
- Role: Air Defence, Training
- Part of: Air Force Forces Command
- Garrison/HQ: Rostock-Laage Airport
- Patron: Johannes Steinhoff

Commanders
- Current commander: LTC Joachim Kaschke

Aircraft flown
- Attack: Formerly: Fiat G.91
- Fighter: Formerly: Canadair Sabre, Mikoyan MiG-29, F-4 Phantom II; Presently: Eurofighter Typhoon
- Reconnaissance: Formerly: Fiat G.91

Taktisches Luftwaffengeschwader (Tactical Air Force Wing) 73 "Steinhoff", formerly known as Jagdgeschwader 73 (Fighter Wing 73), is a fighter wing of the German Air Force. The wing is based in north-eastern Germany at Rostock-Laage Airport near Rostock. Its role includes general air defence as well as training for the Eurofighter Typhoon.

On 1 October 2013, the unit was renamed in the course of adaptations to the new structure of the German Air Force.

== History ==
On 1 April 1959 JG 73 was formed at the former RAF Ahlhorn and Oldenburg, using Canadair Sabre aircraft.

In 1964 Close Air Support was added to the role of tasks with fighter-bomber support for the German Army. Thus a change of aircraft to Fiat G.91 was conducted and the Wing was renamed to Jagdbombergeschwader 42 (Fighter Bomber Wing 42). In 1967 Tactical Reconnaissance became another task of the Wing and a new renaming brought about the Leichtes Kampfgeschwader 42 (Light Combat Wing 42). With the introduction of the RF-4E to the Luftwaffe in 1971, the Wing's role of reconnaissance became redundant and on 1 April 1975 the Wing was named Jagdbombergeschwader 35 (Fighter Bomber Wing 35).

After the reunification of Germany in 1991, the Wing began to take over MiG-29 aircraft from the Air Forces of the National People's Army, the former East German Air Force. The East Germans had flown MiG-29s with Jagdfliegergeschwader 3 at Preschen Airfield. In October a test wing with MiG-29s was formed at Preschen and in February 1993 it was decided to merge this test wing with the then Jagdbombergeschwader 35, to be named Jagdgeschwader 73 once more.

In 1994 the first MiGs were stationed at Laage to form an alert flight for Air Policing. The relocation of the F-4 Phantoms was eventually conducted in 1997 which meant the formal decommissioning of air base at Pferdsfeld. In September 1997, the joint operations of MiG-29s and F-4Fs were taken up at Laage. On 18 September 1997 the Jagdgeschwader 73 was then officially commissioned by Minister of Defence Volker Rühe. At the same time, Rühe awarded the name "Steinhoff" to the re-formed wing.

In March 2000 the 2nd Squadron (F-4F Phantom II) was decommissioned and after a short break it was then re-activated as a training squadron for the Eurofighter. JG 73 received its first six (twin-seat) Eurofighter Typhoons on 30 April 2004. Only a few months later, in August 2004, the last remaining MiG-29s in the Luftwaffe were sold to Poland where the majority continue to fly operationally with the 41st Tactical Squadron stationed at the 22nd Air Base in Malbork (as of 2010).

== June 2019 accident ==
On 24 June 2019, three Eurofighters from Laage conducted a training mission, during which two of the aircraft collided. One pilot ejected and his parachute activated; he was caught in a tree, where he remained for about 20 minutes until rescued. The other pilot was killed, despite his ejection seat and parachute activating. One of the aircraft crashed near the village of Silz in trees, the other crashed to the south at the edge of the Nossentiner Hutter village. The crash zones are about 5 km apart and both aircraft were unarmed.

== Gallery ==
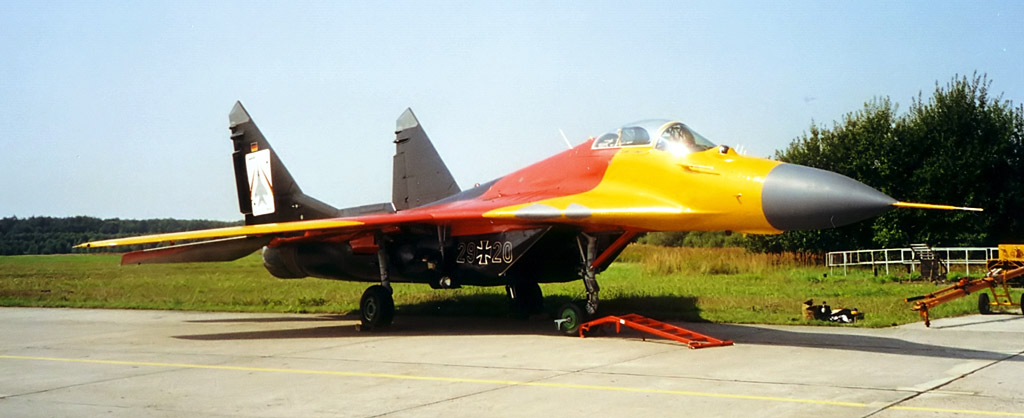
Black-Red-Golden MiG-29 from Laage

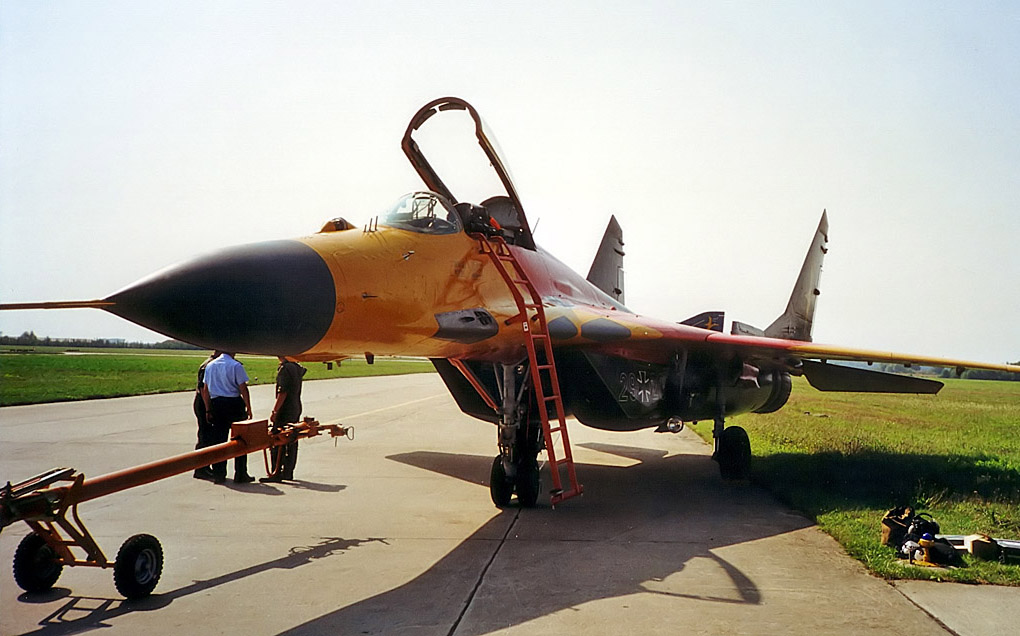
MiG-29 with special paint scheme

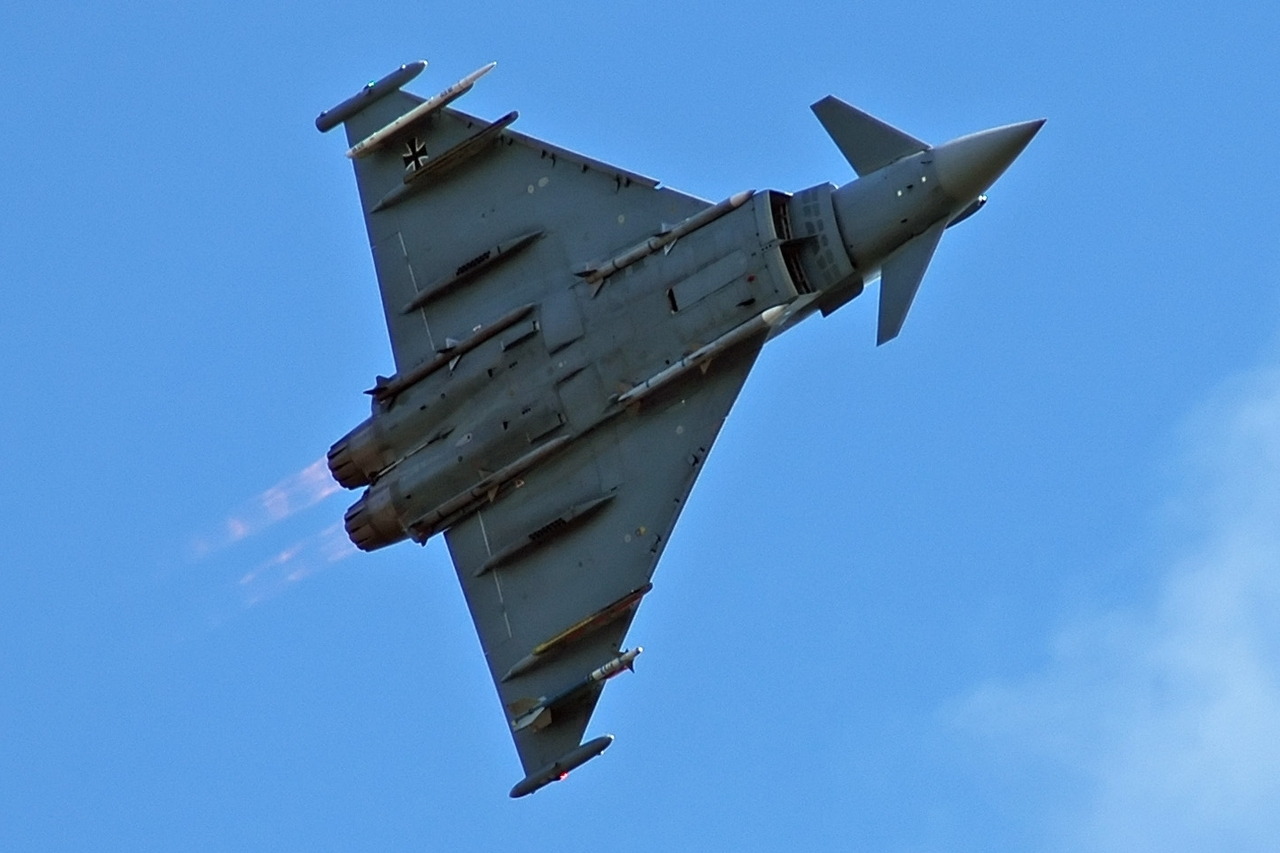
Eurofighter

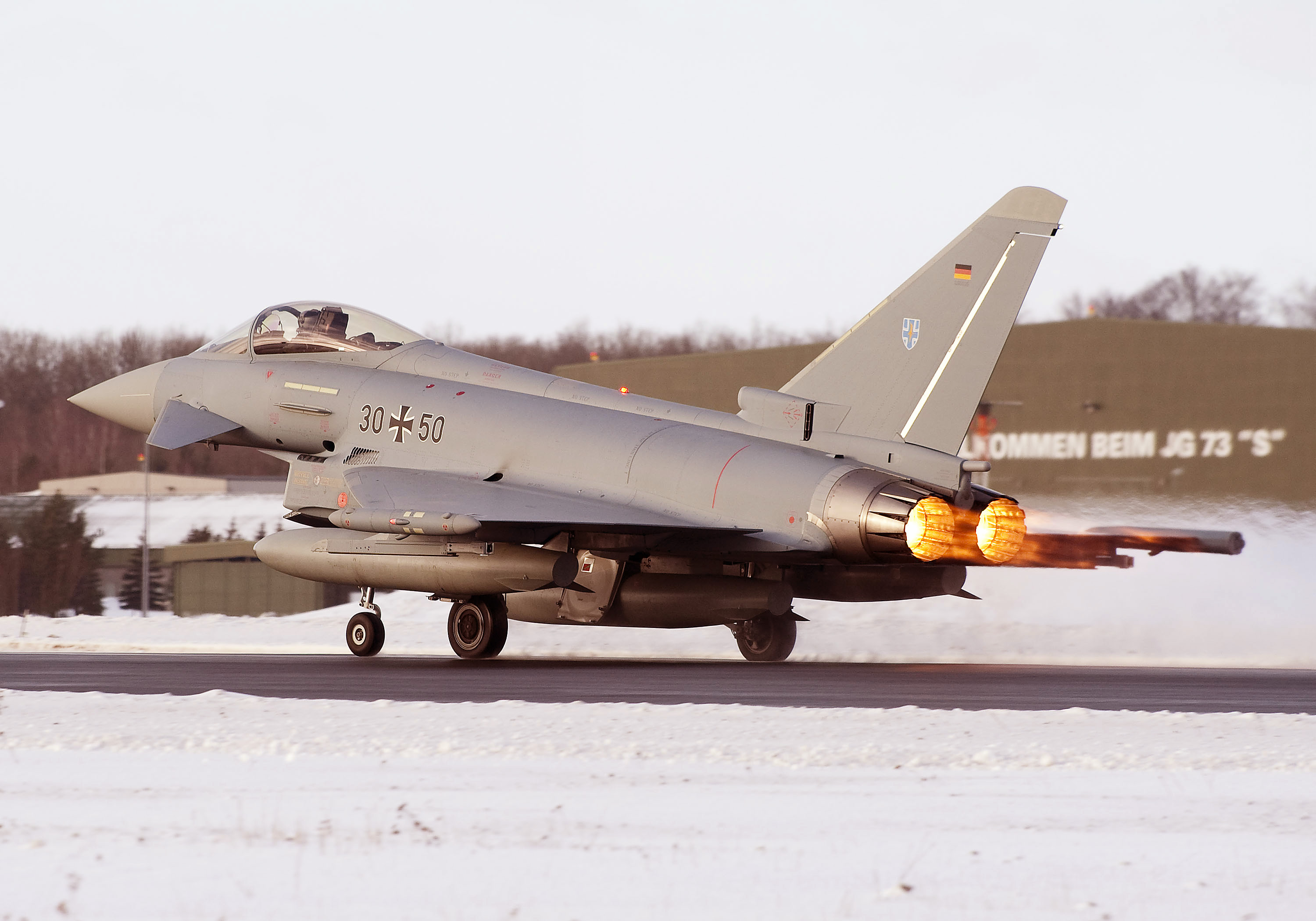
Eurofighter during take-off

== Sources ==
- Official homepage of JG 73 (in German)
