= German Air Force (disambiguation) =

German Air Force is the German and West German air force after World War II.

German Air Force may also refer to:

- Luftstreitkräfte (Imperial German Air Service), before and during World War I
- Luftwaffe (Air Force of Nazi Germany), during World War II
- Air Forces of the National People's Army (East German Air Force), after World War II
