= RLG =

RLG may refer to:

- Research Libraries Group, a former U.S.-based library consortium
- Ring laser gyroscope
- Rostock Laage Airport (IATA airport code)
- Royal Lao Government
