= Preschen Airfield =

Former military airbase in Brandenburg

Coordinates: 51°39′48″N 014°38′00″E

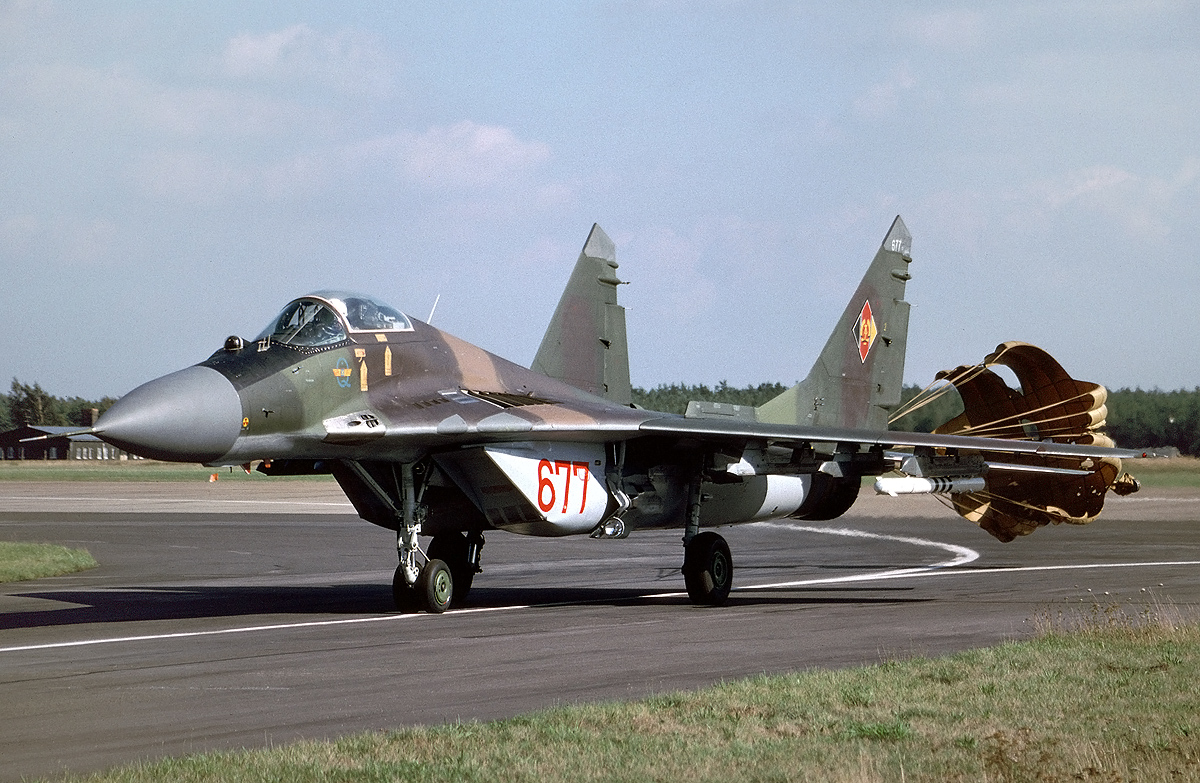
MiG-29 of JG-3 at Preschen (1990)

Preschen is a former military airfield of the Air Forces of the National People's Army. It is located in the municipality Neisse-Malxetal in southern Brandenburg, between the districts Jocksdorf, Preschen and the large community Schackendorf (municipality Groß Schacksdorf).

Created in 1934 as Flugplatz Jocksdorf, the site was used for the first time as a gliding and intermediate landing site from 1937/38 to 1945. After it was captured by the Red Army on 20 April 1945 it was briefly used by Soviet fighter pilots, after which the site was used for agriculture. The actual airfield was built in 1953-54 and used from 1955 to 1990 and gradually expanded. A prefabricated housing estate was built as a residential zone in the nearby village Groß Schacksdorf (´Groß Schacksdorf-Ost).

By December 1956, the LSK/LV had established Fliegergeschwader 3 at the airfield, an air defence wing subordinate to the 1st Air Defence Division. This unit later became Jagdfliegergeschwader 3 (JG-3, English: Fighter Wing 3) flying Mikoyan-Gurevich MiG-17, MiG-19, MiG-21 fighters and later MiG-29s. The JG-3 was the only East German unit flying MiG-19 and MiG-29. In 1974, Taktische Aufklärungsfliegerstaffel 47 (Tactical reconnaissance squadron 47)(TAFS-47) also began operating at Preschen.

In 1989, Preschen had a radio beacon of the Soviet type RSBN. In each of the two approach directions two Non-directional beacons and the landing system PRMG were available. In addition, there was an Airport surveillance radar and a Precision approach radar. The military radio callsign was KOSEL.

After the unification of Germany military flying at the airfield continued, but eventually ceased as some of the approach routes for takeoff and landing were partially over Polish territory.

From 1999 to 2003 there was a techno club, Club K, located in an aircraft hangar on the base. Today the place is run by the company POINT 36, which offers various meeting facilities there. The airport had a 2500 Dash-meter and 80 meter wide runway.

Airport canceled - photovoltaic power plant is there (between 2015-18, according to aerial maps).
