= Air Forces of the National People's Army =

Air force of East Germany

- Luftstreitkräfte der Nationalen Volksarmee
- Roundel of the Luftstreitkräfte
- Active: 1 March 1956–2 October 1990
- Country: East Germany
- Allegiance: State Council of East Germany (until 1990)
- Type: Air force
- Role: Aerial warfare
- Size: 44,000 personnel, 800 combat aircraft (1989)
- Part of: National People's Army

Aircraft flown
- Attack: Su-22
- Fighter: MiG-15, MiG-21, MiG-23, MiG-29
- Helicopter: Mi-2, Mi-8, Mi-14
- Attack helicopter: Mi-24
- Trainer: L-29, L-39
- Transport: Il-62, An-2, An-26, Tupolev Tu-134, Tu-154

The Air Forces of the National People's Army (German: Luftstreitkräfte der Nationalen Volksarmee [LSK], lit. 'Aerial Armed Force of the National People's Army') was the air force of East Germany. As with the Landstreitkräfte, the Volksmarine, and the Border Troops, it was a military branch of the National People's Army (NVA).

At the end of November 1953, a reorganisation of air units saw air units transferred from the Ministry of the Interior directly to the Deputy Minister and Chief of the People's Police. The air regiments were reorganized into the Aero Club 1 (Cottbus), 2 (Drewitz) and 3 (Bautzen), which in turn were divided into two sections. Starting in 1954, additional Z-126 and M-1D from Czechoslovak production were made available.

On 1 March 1956, the air force was officially established as part of the National People's Army, following the GDR's entry into the Warsaw Pact alliance. Initially the air force (LSK), with its headquarters at Cottbus, was separate from the Luftverteidigung (Air Defence), headquartered at Strausberg. It was intended to establish three fighter divisions, an attack aircraft division and an anti-aircraft division. However, eventually only the 1st and 3rd Aviation Divisions and the 1st Flak-Division were created. On 1 June 1957 there was a merger of the two administrations in Strausberg, and the new headquarters was renamed the Kommando LSK/LV.

The name Luftstreitkräfte applied originally to the air corps of the German Empire between 1910 and the end of World War I in 1918. However, the West German Air Force adopted the name 'Luftwaffe' as used by the Nazi-era air force from 1935 to the end of World War II.

== Organization ==
=== Kommando Luftstreitkräfte/Luftverteidigung (Kdo LSK/LV) ===
A number of military units and formations were under direct control of the Kommando LSK/LV, the Air Force Staff, and the Air Force Command of the NPA, with its HQ in Strausberg.

- Transport Regiment 44 (TFG-44) "Arthur Pieck", Marxwalde
  - 1st Transport Squadron (I.TFS/TFG-44), Tu-154M
  - 2nd Transport Squadron (II.TFS/TFG-44), Tupolev Tu-134A
  - 3rd Helicopter Squadron (III.TFS/TFG-44), Mi-8S
  - 4th Transport Squadron (IV.TFS/TFG-44), Il-62M, Berlin/Schönefeld

=== 1st Air Defence Division (1st LVD) ===
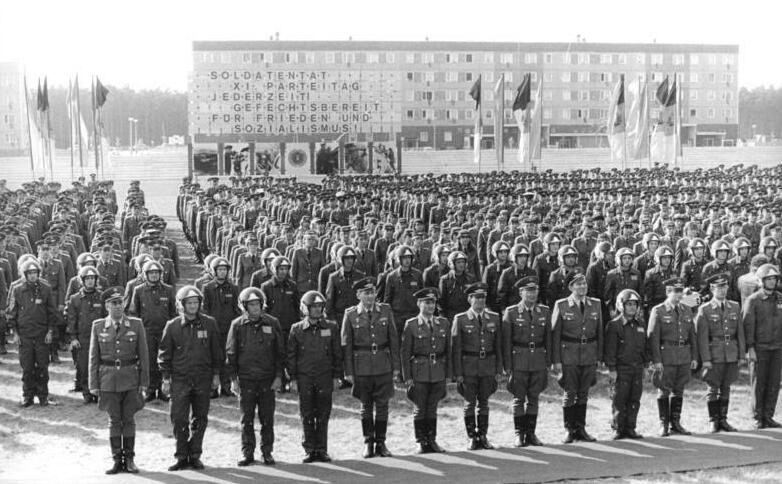
Soldiers of the Fritz Schmenkel fighter wing, 1985

The 1st Luftverteidigungsdivision (en: Air Defence Division), with its HQ in Cottbus, was charged with providing air defence throughout the southern territory of the GDR. The following units were subordinated to that particular division:

- Liaison Company 31 (VFK-31) An-2, Zlín Z 43, Cottbus
- First Fighter Regiment (JG-1) "Fritz Schmenkel", Holzdorf Air Base
  - 1st Fighter Squadron (I.JS/JG-1), MiG-21MF, MiG-21UM
  - 2nd Fighter Squadron (II.JS/JG-1), MiG-21MF, MiG-21UM, MiG-21SPS-K
  - 3rd Fighter Squadron (III.JS/JG-1), MiG-21MF, MiG-21UM
  - Fliegertechnisches Bataillon 1 (FTB-1) "Willi Budich", Holzdorf (Jessen)
  - Communications and Air Traffic Control Battalion 1 (NFB-1), Holzdorf
- 3rd Fighter Regiment (JG-3) "Wladimir Komarow", Preschen Air Base
  - 1st Fighter Squadron (I.JS/JG-3), MiG-29A, MiG-29UB
  - 2nd Fighter Squadron (II.JS/JG-3), MiG-29A, MIG-29UB
  - 3rd Fighter Squadron (III.JS/JG-3), MiG-21MF-75, MiG-21UM
  - Fliegertechnisches Bataillon 3 (FTB-3) "Walter Stoecker", Preschen
  - Communications and Air Traffic Control Battalion 3 (NFB-3), Preschen
- 7th Fighter Regiment (JG-7) "Wilhelm Pieck", Drewitz Air Base (disbanded in 1989)
  - 1st Fighter-bomber Squadron (I.JBS/JBG-7), MiG-21MF, MiG-21UM
  - 2nd Fighter-bomber Squadron (II.JBS/JBG-7), MiG-21MF, MiG-21UM
  - Nachrichten- und Flugsicherungsbataillon 7 (NFB-7), Drewitz
- 8th Fighter Regiment (JG-8) "Hermann Matern", Marxwalde
  - 1st Fighter Squadron (I.JS/JG-8), MiG-21bis, MiG-21UM
  - 2nd Fighter Squadron (II.JS/JG-8), MiG-21bis, MiG-21UM
  - 3rd Fighter Squadron (III.JS/JG-8), MiG-21bis, MiG-21UM
  - Fliegertechnisches Bataillon 8 (FTB-8), Marxwalde
  - Communications and Air Traffic Control Battalion 8 Nachrichten- und Flugsicherungsbataillon 8 (NFB-8), Marxwalde
- 41. Fla-Raketenbrigade (41. FRBr) "Hermann Dunker", Ladeburg
  - Fla-Raketenabteilungsgruppe 411 (FRAG-411), Badingen
  - Fla-Raketenabteilung 4121 (FRA-4121), Fürstenwalde
  - Fla-Raketenabteilung 4122 (FRA-4122), Prötzel
  - Fla-Raketenabteilung 4123 (FRA-4123), Klosterfelde
  - Fla-Raketenabteilung 4124 (FRA-4124), Beetz near Kremmen
  - Fla-Raketenabteilung 4131 (FRA-4131), Schönermark
  - Fla-Raketenabteilung 4132 (FRA-4132), Fehrbellin
  - Fla-Raketenabteilung 4133 (FRA-4133), Zachow
  - Fla-Raketenabteilung 4134 (FRA-4134), Markgraf-Pieske
  - Funktechnische Abteilung 4101 (FuTA-4101), Ladeburg
  - Technische Abteilung 4120 (TA-4120), Ladeburg
- 51. Fla-Raketenbrigade (51. FRBr) "Werner Lamberz", Sprötau
  - Fla-Raketenabteilungsgruppe 511 (FRAG-511), Eckolstädt
  - Fla-Raketenabteilung 5121 (FRA-5121), Dietersdorf
  - Fla-Raketenabteilung 5122 (FRA-5122), Blankenburg
  - Fla-Raketenabteilung 5123 (FRA-5123), Seebergen
  - Fla-Raketenabteilung 5124 (FRA-5124), Remda
  - Fla-Raketenabteilung 5125 (FRA-5125), Eckolstädt
  - Technische Abteilung 5120 (TA-5120), Sprötau
- Fla-Raketenregiment 31 (FRR-31) "Jaroslaw Dombrowski", Straßgräbchen
  - Fla-Raketenabteilung 311 (FRA-311), Groß Döbern
  - Fla-Raketenabteilung 312 (FRA-312), Großräschen
  - Fla-Raketenabteilung 313 (FRA-313), Kroppen
  - Fla-Raketenabteilung 314 (FRA-314), Großröhrsdorf
  - Technische Abteilung 310 (TA-310), Straßgräbchen
- Funktechnisches Bataillon 31 (FuTB 31), Döbern
- Funktechnisches Bataillon 41 (FuTB-41) "Arvid Harnack", Holzdorf
- Funktechnisches Bataillon 51 (FuTB-51) "Paul Schäfer", Sprötau
- Funktechnisches Bataillon 61 (FuTB-61), Müncheberg
- Nachrichtenbataillon 31 (NB-31) "August Willich", Cottbus

=== 3rd Air Defence Division (3rd LVD) ===
The 3rd Luftverteidigungsdivision, with its HQ in Trollenhagen, was in charge to provide air defence throughout the northern territory of the GDR. The following units were subordinated to that particular division:

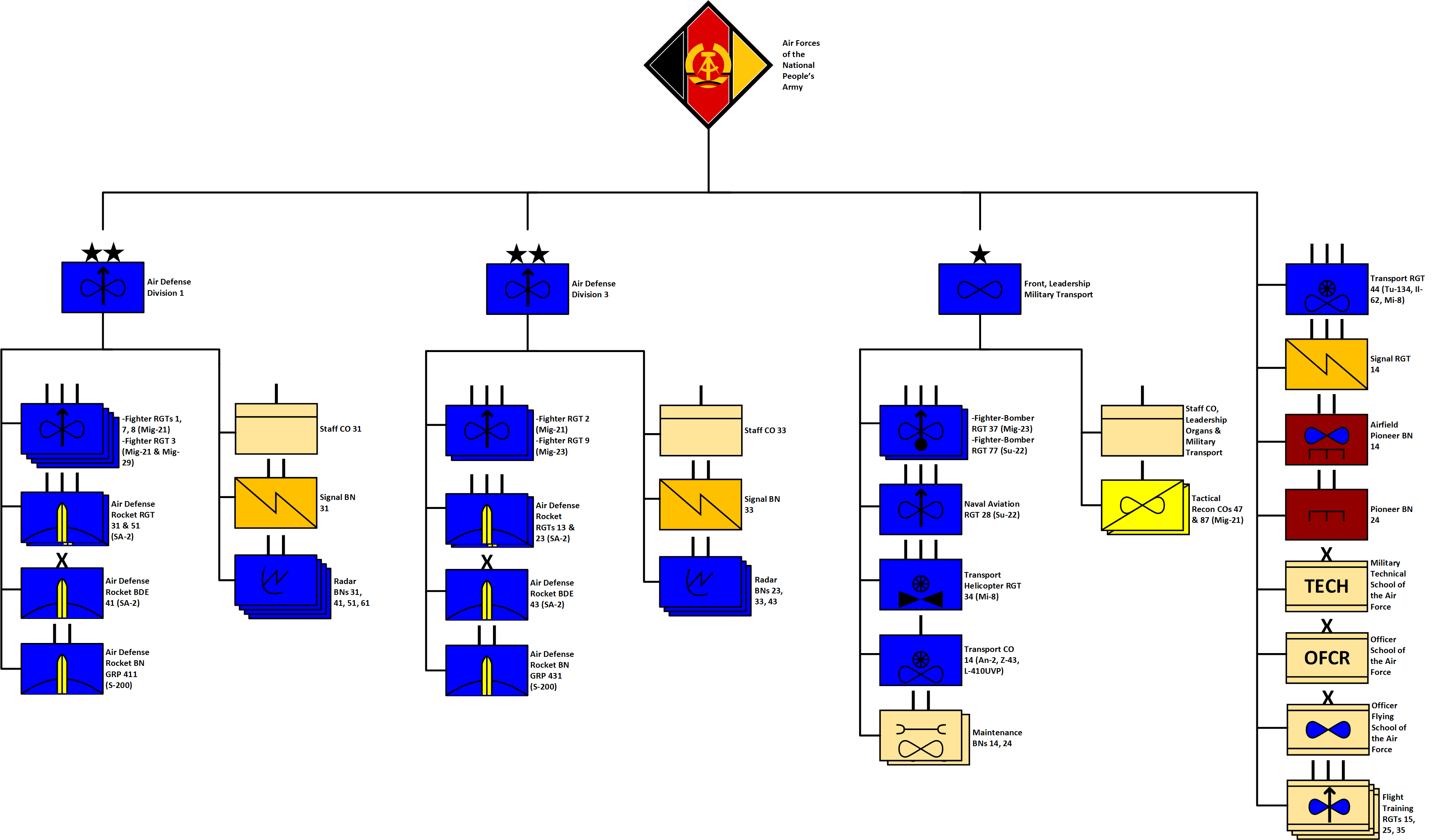
Structure of the Luftstreitkräfte, 1988

- Verbindungsfliegerkette 33 (VFK-33) An-2, Zlín Z 43, (Communication flight), Trollenhagen Air Base
- Musikkorps der LSK/LV, Trollenhagen
- Jagdfliegergeschwader 2 (JG-2) "Juri Gagarin", Trollenhagen Air Base
  - I.Jagdfliegerstaffel/JG-2 (I.JS/JG-2), MiG-21M, MiG-21UM
  - II.Jagdfliegerstaffel/JG-2 (II.JS/JG-2), MiG-21M, MiG-21UM
  - III.Jagdfliegerstaffel/JG-2 (III.JS/JG-2), MiG-21M, MiG-21UM
  - Fliegertechnisches Bataillon 2 (FTB-2) "Herbert Baum", Trollenhagen
  - Nachrichten- und Flugsicherungsbataillon 2 (NFB-2), Trollenhagen
- Jagdfliegergeschwader 9 (JG-9) "Heinrich Rau", Peenemünde Air Base
  - I.Jagdfliegerstaffel/JG-9 (I.JS/JG-9), MiG-23ML
  - II.Jagdfliegerstaffel/JG-9 (II.JS/JG-9), MiG-23MF, MiG-23UB
  - III.Jagdfliegerstaffel/JG-9 (III.JS/JG-9), MiG-23ML
  - Zieldarstellungskette 33 (ZDK-33), L-39V, L-39ZO, (Target towing flight)
  - Fliegertechnisches Bataillon 9 (FTB-9) "Käthe Niederkirchner", Peenemünde
  - Nachrichten- und Flugsicherungsbataillon 9 (NFB-9), Peenemünde
- 43. Fla-Raketenbrigade (43. FRBr) "Erich Weinert", Sanitz
  - Fla-Raketenabteilungsgruppe 431 (FRAG-431), Cammin/Prangendorf
  - Fla-Raketenabteilung 4321 (FRA-4321), Abtshagen
  - Fla-Raketenabteilung 4322 (FRA-4322), Barth
  - Fla-Raketenabteilung 4323 (FRA-4323), Hinrichshagen
  - Fla-Raketenabteilung 4324 (FRA-4324), Neuenkirchen
  - Fla-Raketenabteilung 4331 (FRA-4331), Barhöft
  - Fla-Raketenabteilung 4332 (FRA-4332), Nienhagen
  - Fla-Raketenabteilung 4333 (FRA-4333), Bastorf
  - Fla-Raketenabteilung 4334 (FRA-4334), Kirchdorf
  - Fla-Raketenabteilung 4335 (FRA-4335), Dranske
  - Fla-Raketenabteilung 4351 (FRA-4351), Retschow
  - Funktechnische Abteilung 4301 (FuTA-4301), Rövershagen
  - Technische Abteilung 4320 (TA-4320), Sanitz
- Fla-Raketenregiment 13 (FRR-13) "Etkar André", Parchim
  - Fla-Raketenabteilung 131 (FRA-131), Warin
  - Fla-Raketenabteilung 132 (FRA-132), Tramm
  - Fla-Raketenabteilung 133 (FRA-133), Ziegendorf
  - Fla-Raketenabteilung 134 (FRA-134), Steffenshagen
  - Technische Abteilung 130 (TA-130), Parchim
- Fla-Raketenregiment 23 (FRR-23) "Rudolf Breitscheid", Stallberg
  - Fla-Raketenabteilung 231 (FRA-231), Altwarp
  - Fla-Raketenabteilung 232 (FRA-232), Eichhof
  - Fla-Raketenabteilung 233 (FRA-233), Burg-Stargard
  - Fla-Raketenabteilung 234 (FRA-234), Weggun
- Funktechnisches Bataillon 23 (FuTB-23) "Liselotte Herrmann", Pragsdorf
- Funktechnisches Bataillon 33 (FuTB-33) "Fritz Behn", Pudagla
- Funktechnisches Bataillon 43 (FuTB-43), Parchim
- Nachrichtenbataillon 33 (NB-33) "Max Christiansen-Clausen", Trollenhagen

=== FO FMTFK ===
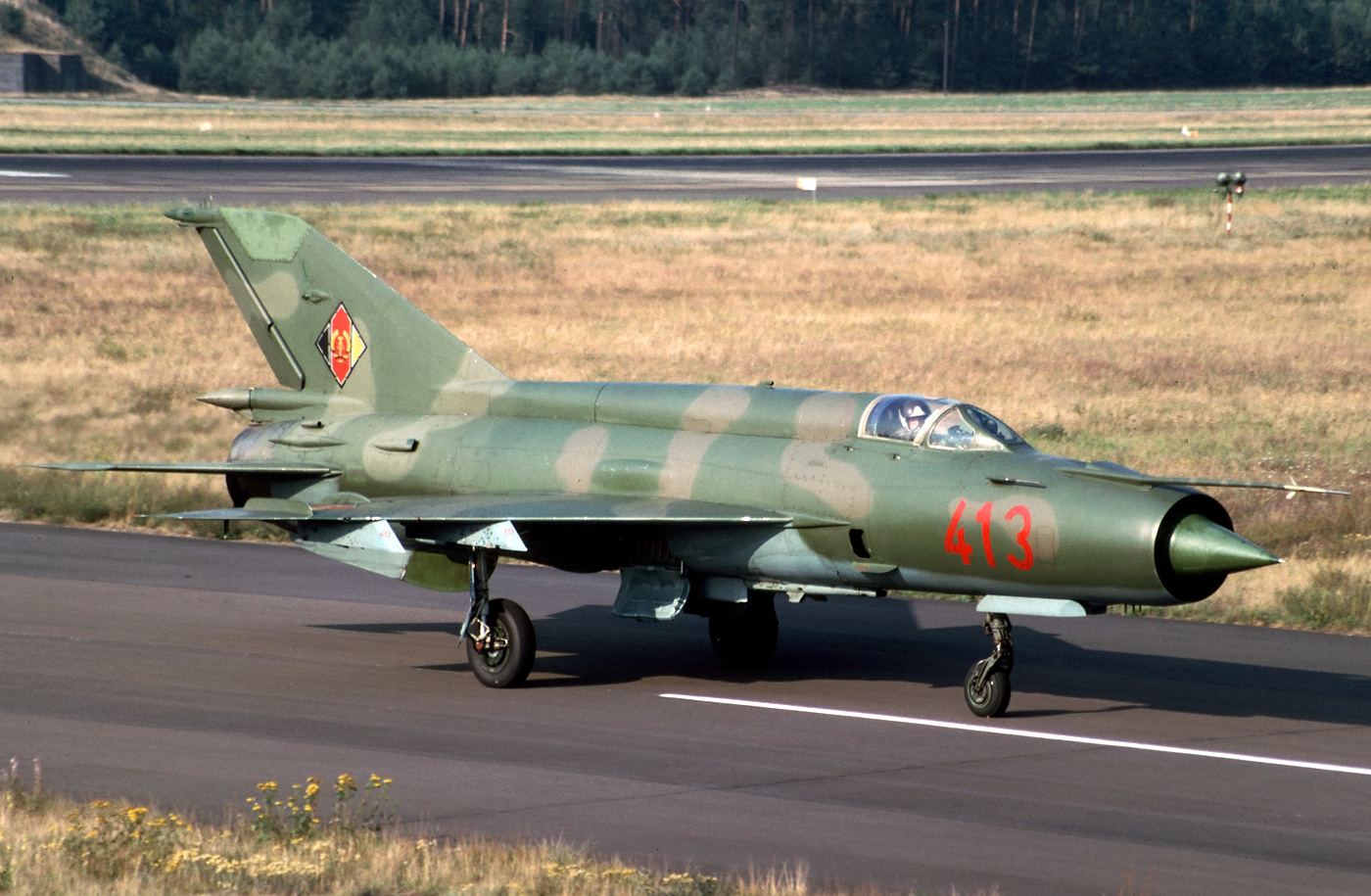
MiG-21M of the LSK/LV of the NVA

All fighter-bomber aircraft, transport aircraft, reconnaissance aircraft and transport helicopters were under the control of the FO FMTFK (roughly translates into: "Lead unit of the Frontal and Military air units", Führungsorgan der Front- und Militärtransportfliegerkräfte). The following units were part of the FO FMTFK:

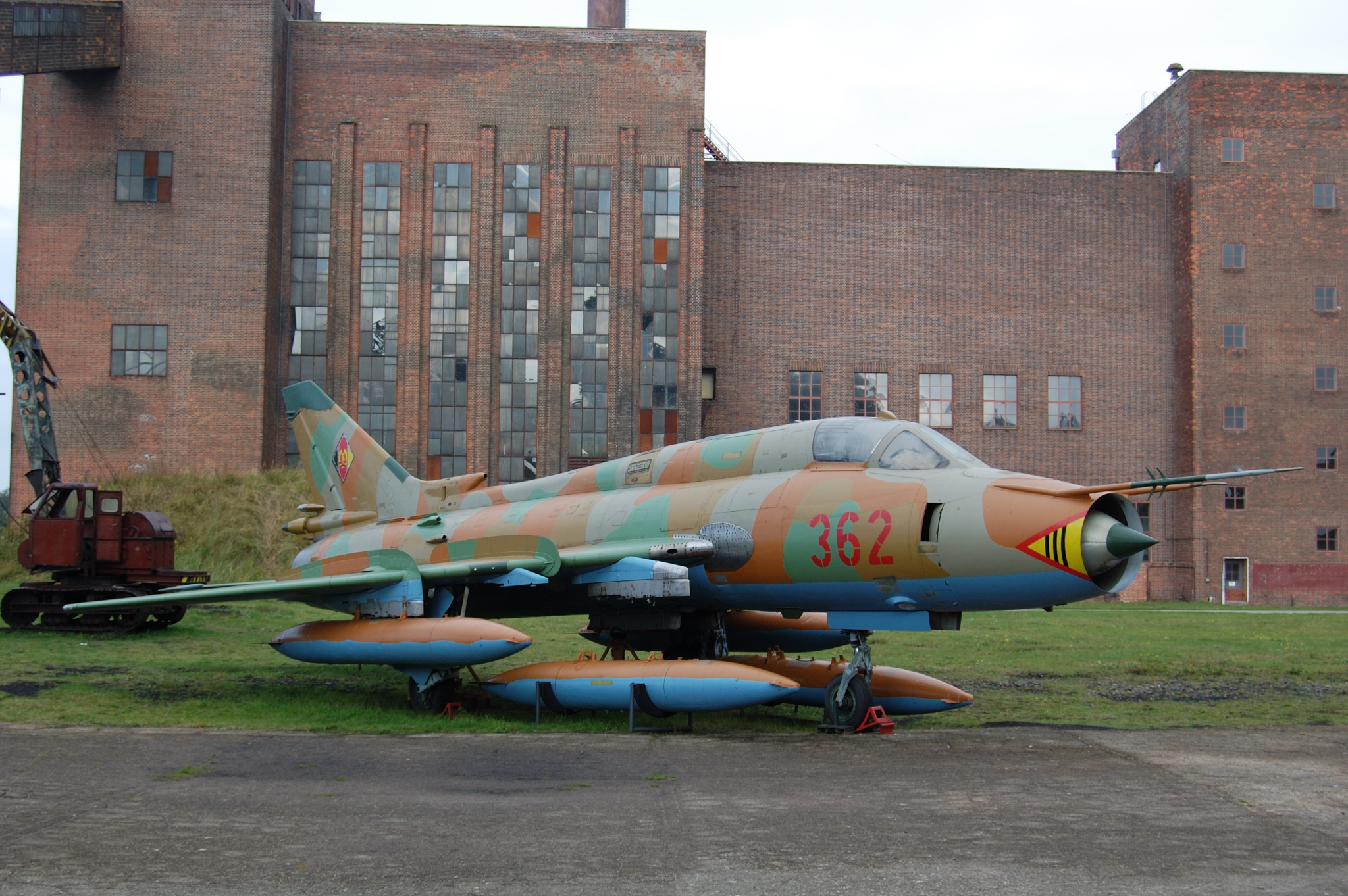
Su-22 of the FO FMTFK

- Jagdbombenfliegergeschwader 37 (JBG-37) "Klement Gottwald", Drewitz Air Base
  - I.Jagdbombenfliegerstaffel/JBG-37 (I.JBS/JBG-37), MiG-23BN, MiG-23UB
  - II.Jagdbombenfliegerstaffel/JBG-37 (II.JBS/JBG-37), MiG-23BN, MiG-23UB
  - Fliegertechnisches Bataillon 37 (FTB-37), Drewitz
  - Nachrichten- und Flugsicherungsbataillon 37 (NFB-37), Drewitz
- Jagdbombenfliegergeschwader 77 (JBG-77) "Gebhardt Leberecht von Blücher", Laage Air Base
  - I.Jagdbombenfliegerstaffel/JBG-77 (I.JBS/JBG-77), Su-22M-4, Su-22UM-3K
  - II.Jagdbombenfliegerstaffel/JBG-77 (II.JBS/JBG-77), Su-22M-4, Su-22UM-3K
  - Fliegertechnisches Bataillon 77 (FTB-77), Laage
  - Nachrichten- und Flugsicherungsbataillon 77 (NFB-77), Laage
- Marinefliegergeschwader 28 (MFG-28) "Paul Wieczorek", Laage Air Base
  - I.Marinefliegerstaffel/MFG28 (I.MFS/MFG-28), Su-22M-4, Su-22UM-3K
  - II.Marinefliegerstaffel/MFG28 (II.MFS/MFG-28), Su-22M-4, Su-22UM-3K
  - Fliegertechnisches Bataillon 28 (FTB-28), Laage
  - Nachrichten- und Flugsicherungsbataillon 28 (NFB-28), Laage
- Transporthubschraubergeschwader 34 (THG-34) "Werner Seelenbinder", Brandenburg-Briest
  - I.Transporthubschrauberstaffel/THG-34 (I.THS/THG-34), Mi-8T
  - II.Transporthubschrauberstaffel/THG-34 (II.THS/THG-34), Mi-8T
  - Fliegertechnisches Bataillon 34 (FTB-34), Brandenburg-Briest
- Verbindungsfliegerstaffel 14 (VS-14), Strausberg
  - Verbindungsfliegerstaffel 14 (VS-14), An-2, L-410UVP, Zlin-43
  - Fliegertechnisches Bataillon 14 (FTB-14), Strausberg
- Transportfliegerstaffel 24 (TFS-24), Dresden-Klotzsche Airport
  - Transportfliegerstaffel 24 (TS-24), An-26
  - Fliegertechnisches Bataillon 24 (FTB-24), Dresden-Klotzsche
- Taktische Aufklärungsfliegerstaffel 47 (TAFS-47), MiG-21M, MiG-21UM, Preschen Air Base
- Taktische Aufklärungsfliegerstaffel 87 (TAFS-87), MiG-21M, MiG-21UM, Drewitz Air Base

=== Offiziershochschule für Militärflieger ===
The Offiziershochschule für Militärflieger (OHS MF), with its headquarters at Bautzen, was the command responsible for providing training. It had the following assigned units:

- Fliegerausbildungsgeschwader 15 "Heinz Kapelle", Rothenburg
  - I.Fliegerstaffel (I.FS), MiG-21SPS, MiG-21SPS-K, MiG-21U, MiG-21UM/US
  - II.Fliegerstaffel (II.FS), MiG-21SPS, MiG-21SPS-K, MiG-21U, MiG-21UM/US
  - III.Fliegerstaffel (III.FS), MiG-21SPS, MiG-21SPS-K, MiG-21U, MiG-21UM/US
  - IV.Fliegerstaffel (IV.FS), MiG-21SPS, MiG-21SPS-K, MiG-21U, MiG-21UM/US
  - V.Fliegerstaffel (V.FS), MiG-21SPS, MiG-21SPS-K, MiG-21U, MiG-21UM/US
  - VI.Fliegerstaffel (VI.FS), MiG-21SPS, MiG-21SPS-K, MiG-21U, MiG-21UM/US
- Fliegerausbildungsgeschwader 25 "Leander Ratz", Bautzen
  - I.Fliegerstaffel (I.FS), L-39ZO
  - II.Fliegerstaffel (II.FS), L-39ZO
  - III.Fliegerstaffel (III.FS), L-39ZO
- Hubschrauberausbildungsgeschwader 35 (HAG-35) "Lambert Horn", Brandenburg/Briest
  - I.Hubschrauberstaffel/HAG-35 (I.HS/HAG-35), Mi-2
  - II.Hubschrauberstaffel/HAG-35 (II.HS/HAG-35), Mi-8PS, Mi-8T
- Transportfliegerausbildungsstaffel 45 (TAS-45), An-2, L-410UVP, Zlin-43, Kamenz

== Insignia ==
A diamond-shaped symbol identified LSK aircraft – divided into vertical black, red, and gold stripes corresponding to the horizontal fesses or bars on the GDR state flag. The centre of the diamond portrayed the GDR coat of arms: a hammer and compass surrounded by a wreath of yellow grain. The symbol differentiated the Luftstreitkräfte from the West German Luftwaffe, which displayed a stylised Iron Cross similar to the emblem on German aircraft during World War I.

== Uniforms ==
The uniforms of the two German air forces were also different: following an older German tradition, LSK/LV uniforms were the same stone gray worn by army personnel, modified by distinctive blue insignia (similar in style, but not colour, to World War II Luftwaffe ranks) and piping. West German uniforms, on the other hand, were blue with yellow insignia and more closely modelled on those worn by Luftwaffe personnel during World War II.

An NVA poster advertising a career.

== Aircraft ==
Personal log book of a Mil Mi-24 attack helicopter pilot.

Starting in 1953, East Germany received An-2, La-9, Yak-11, and Yak-18 aircraft and the MiG-15bis/UTI, MiG-17/Lim-5P, An-14A, Il-14P, MiG-9, MiG-19, Il-28, Mi-4, and Ka-26 in 1956 which were provided by the Soviet Union. The first MiG-21s were delivered in 1962, being the MiG-21F-13. The 1970s saw the introduction of the MiG-23, while Su-22 fighter-bombers were delivered in the 1980s. The latest addition was the MiG-29 in 1988. The inventory also included Soviet-built helicopters along with trainers and other light aircraft manufactured in the Soviet Union.

The East German Air Force was unique among Warsaw Pact countries in that it was often equipped with the most advanced Soviet fighters, instead of downgraded export models. As an extension of the Soviet 16th Air Army deployed in East Germany, the Luftstreitkräfte was expected to play a front-line role in any war with NATO. As a result, it was under closer Soviet control than the air forces of other Warsaw Pact states.

After German reunification in 1990, the Luftwaffe assumed control over Luftstreitkräfte equipment and enlisted some of its personnel. Many of the GDR's military aircraft were obsolete or incompatible with NATO technical standards, and were sold to other countries. However, the Luftwaffe did retain the MiG-29 in both air defense and aggressor roles because of its excellent capabilities.

=== LSK/LV equipment ===
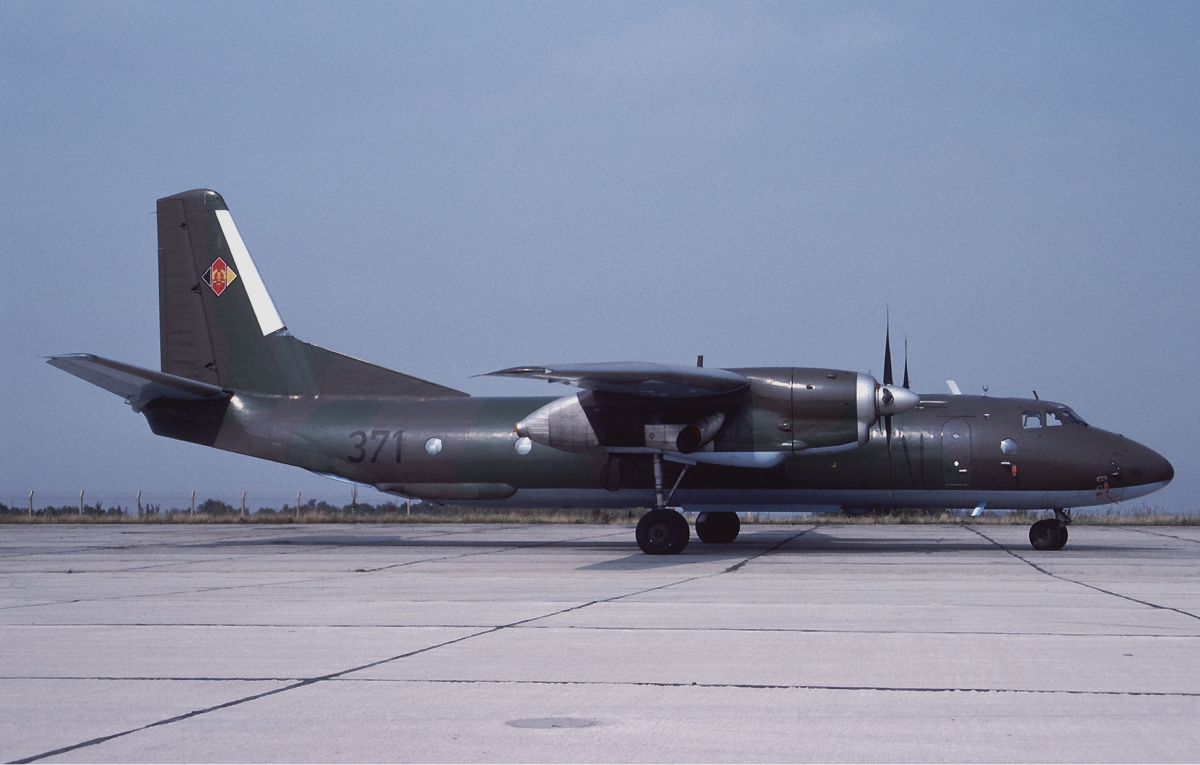
An Antonov An-26T at Dresden in August 1990, one week before the Luftstreitkräfte was grounded.

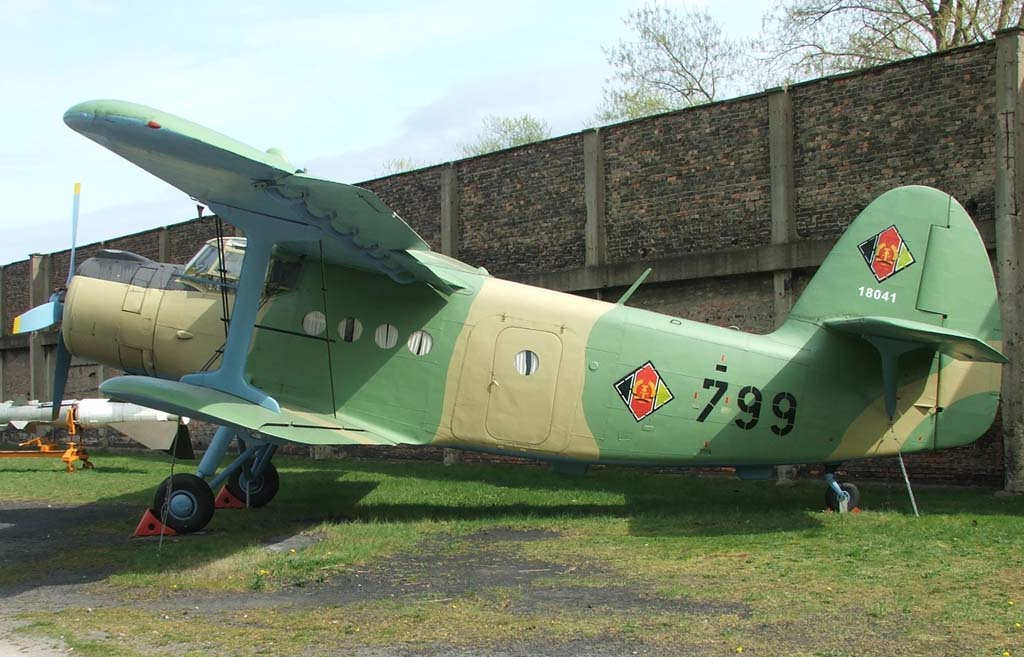
An An-2 Colt with NVA markings.

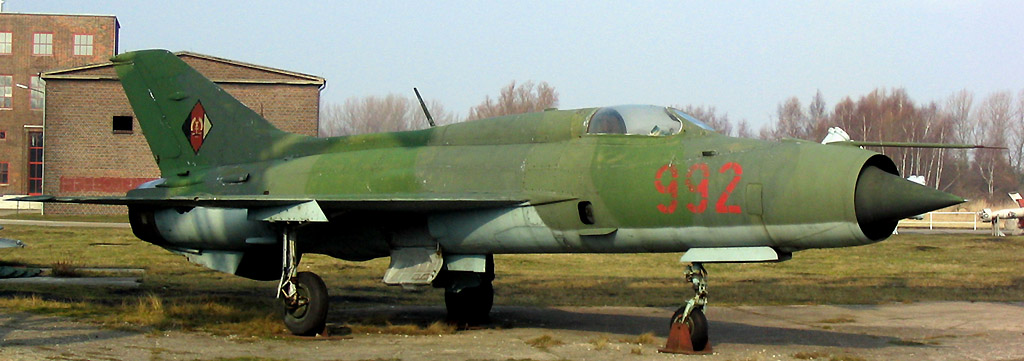
An MiG-21PFM with NVA markings.

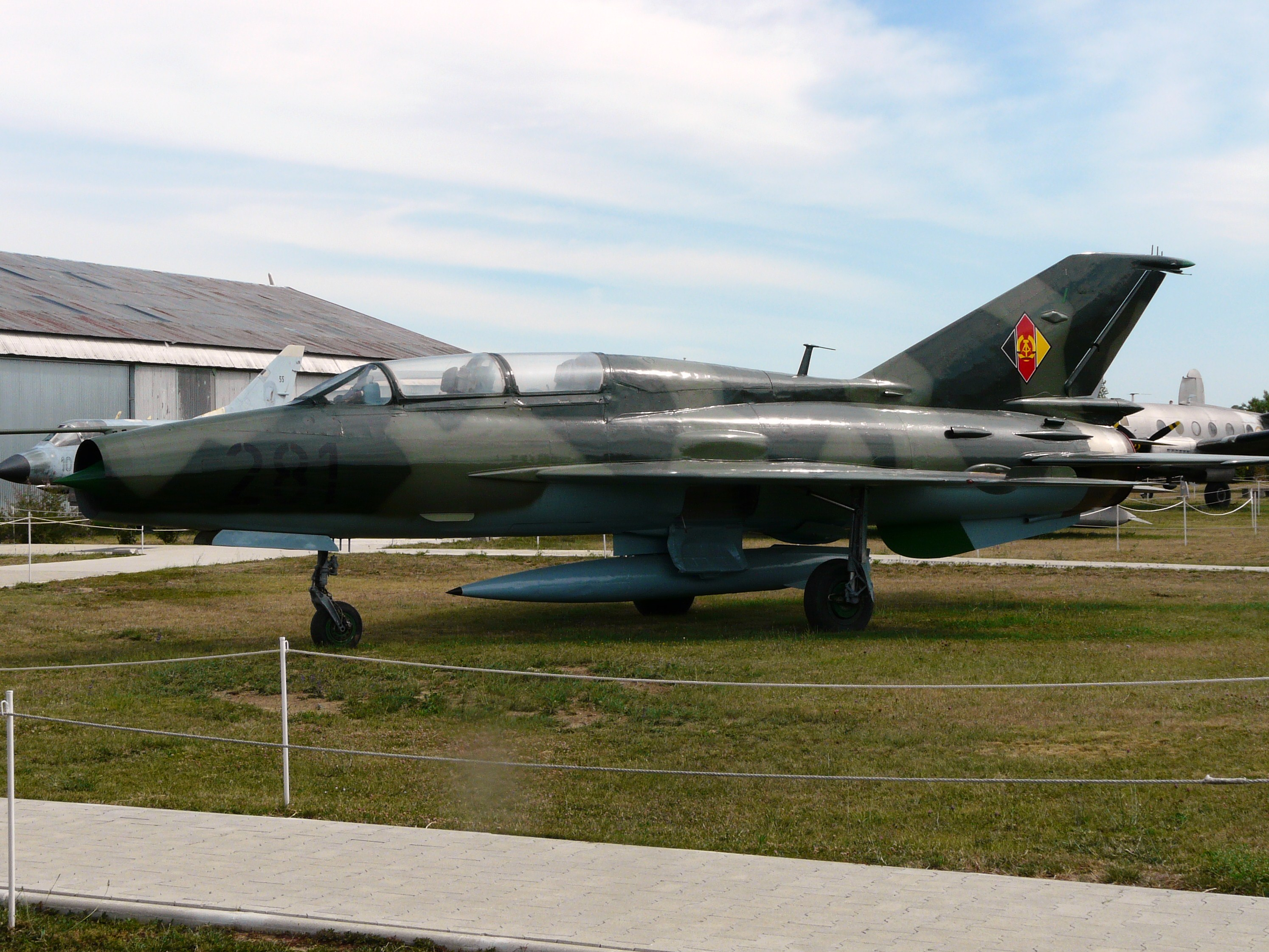
An MiG-21U at the Montélimar Ancône Museum in France.

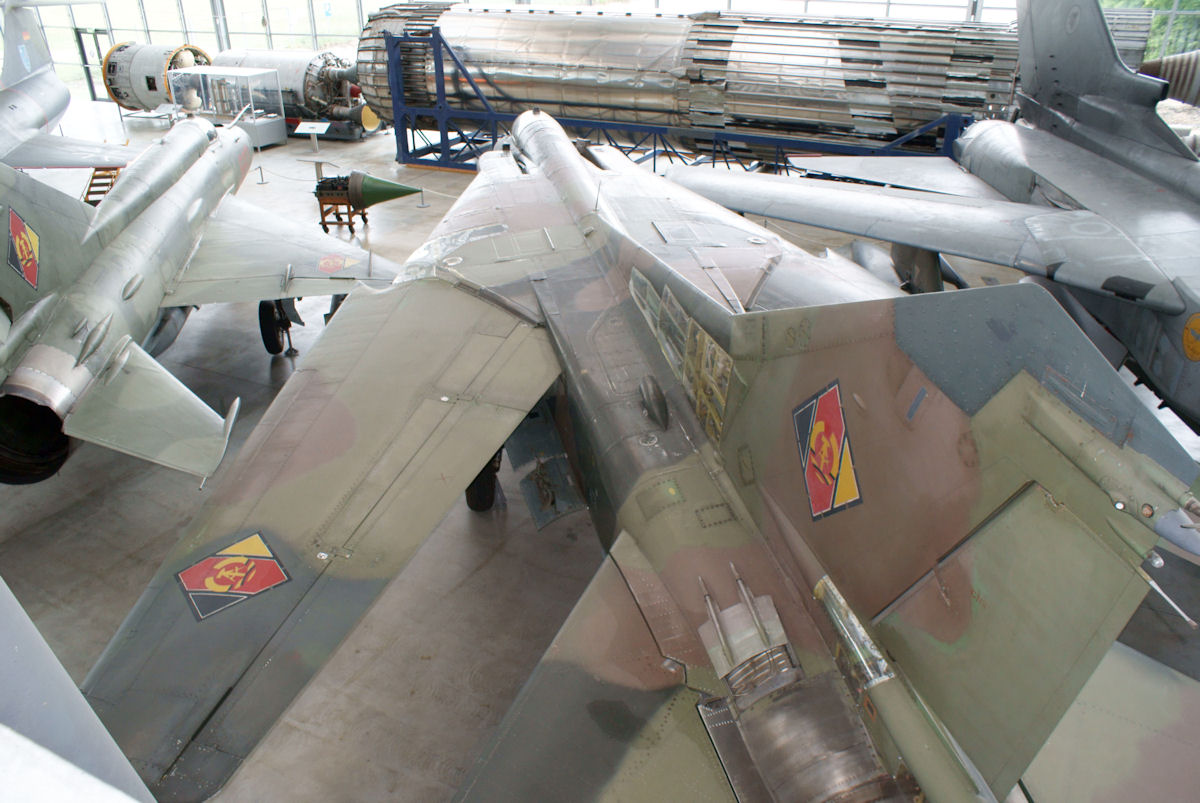
MiG-23BN Flogger-H Red 701 NVA Air Force.

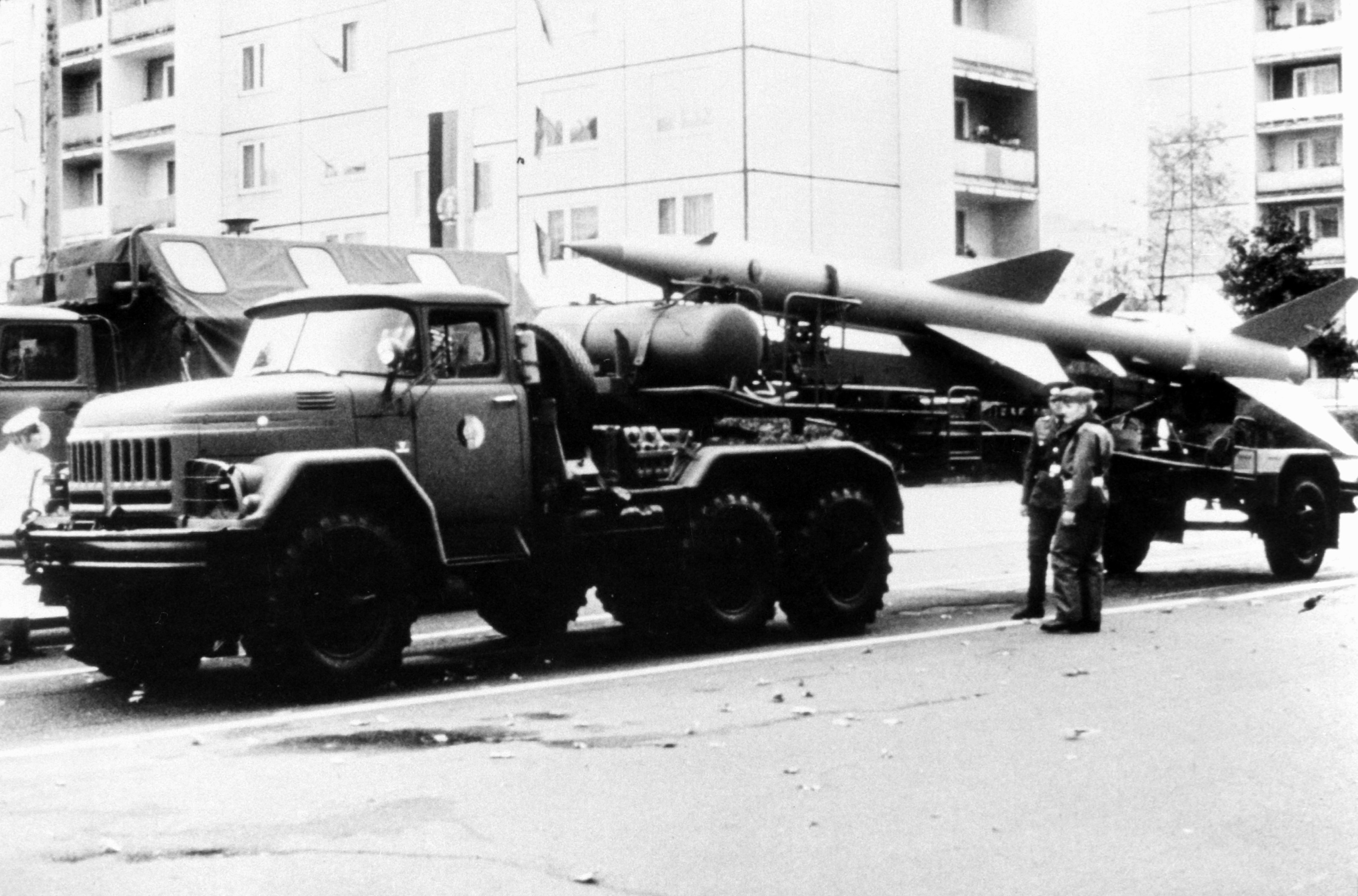
An SA-2 surface-to-air (SAM) missile mounted on a Zil-131 transporter of the East German Army.

Equipment of the LSK/LV in 1989:

Category	Equipment	Country of origin	Number	Note
Fighter aircraft/trainers	MiG-21F-13/PF/PFM/MF/bis/SPS/U/UM/US	Soviet Union	227	The breakdown includes 87 MiG-21Ms, 62 MiG-21MFs, and 14 MiG-21bis75A, 27 MiG-21bis75B, 37 MiG-21UM.
Fighter aircraft/trainers	MiG-23MF/ML/UB	Soviet Union	43	The breakdown includes 32 MiG-23ML, and 11 MiG-23UB.
Fighter aircraft/trainers	MiG-23 BN	Soviet Union	22	Although deployed as a fighter-bomber, it was capable of flying at Mach 2 compared to the Soviet MiG-27.
Fighter aircraft/trainers	MiG-29A/UB	Soviet Union	24	The breakdown is 20 MiG-29A (9.12A) and 4 MiG-29UB.until 2004. Then 22 sold on to Poland for one symbolic Euro.
Fighter aircraft/trainers	Su-22M4/UM3K	Soviet Union	54	The breakdown is 48 Su-22M4s and 8 Su-22UM3Ks.
Fighter aircraft/trainers	L-39ZO/V	Czechoslovakia	54	The breakdown is 52 L-39ZO and 2 L-39V.
Fighter aircraft/trainers	L-29	Czechoslovakia	51	
Transport aircraft	An-2	Soviet Union	18	
Transport aircraft	An-26ST/SM/M	Soviet Union	12	The breakdown includes one SM type with electronic warfare specifications, one M type with air surveillance specifications, and 10 ST types with troop transport specifications.
Transport aircraft	Il-62M/MK	Soviet Union	3	until 1993.The breakdown is two M-type aircraft and one MK-type aircraft.
Transport aircraft	Tu-134A/AK	Soviet Union	3	until 1992.The breakdown is two A-type aircraft and one AK-type aircraft.
Transport aircraft	Tu-154M	Soviet Union	2	until 1997
Transport aircraft	L-410	Czechoslovakia	12	until 2000
Transport aircraft	Z-43	Czechoslovakia	12	
Helicopters	Mi-2S	Poland	25	
Helicopters	Mi-8T/TB/TBK/PS/BT・Mi-9	Soviet Union	144	until 1997. The breakdown includes 6 radio relay type Mi-9s, 14 mine-laying M-8BTs, 5 Mi-8Ts, 10 Mi-8TBs, 50 Mi-8TPSs, and Mi-8TVKs. There are 50 aircraft.
Helicopters	Mi-24D/P	Soviet Union	54	until 1993.The breakdown is 42 D-type aircraft and 12 P-type aircraft.
Helicopters	Mi-14PL	Soviet Union	14	
Surface-to-air missiles	S-75 Dvina	Soviet Union	48	
Surface-to-air missiles	S-75 Volchov	Soviet Union	174	
Surface-to-air missiles	S-125 Neva/Pechora	Soviet Union	40	
Surface-to-air missiles	S-200 Vega	Soviet Union	24	
Surface-to-air missiles	S-300	Soviet Union	12	

=== Equipment before 1989 ===
- MiG-15bis - 57 (regular)
- MiG-15UTI - 120 (regular)
- MiG-17 - 15 (regular)
- MiG-17F - 173 (regular)
- Lim-5P - 40 (regular)
- MiG-19S - 12 (regular)
- MiG-19PM - 12 (regular)
- MiG-21F-13 - 76 (regular)
- MiG-21PF - 53 (regular)
- MiG-21SPS - 84 (regular)
- MiG-21SPS-K - 55 (regular)
- MiG-21U-U66-400 - 14 (regular)
- MiG-21U-U66-600 - 31 (regular)
- MiG-21US - 17 (regular)
- MiG-23S - 1 (regular)
- MiG-23MF - 12 (regular)
- Il-28 - 12 (regular)
- Il-28U - 1 (regular)
- Yak-11 - 100 (regular)
- Yak-18 - 20
- Yak-18U - 45
- An-14A - 4 (regular)
- Il-14P - 80 (regular)
- Mi-4A - 55 (regular)
- Ka-26 - 24 (regular)
