= Rostock–Laage Airport =

Rostock Airport Flughafen Rostock–Laage
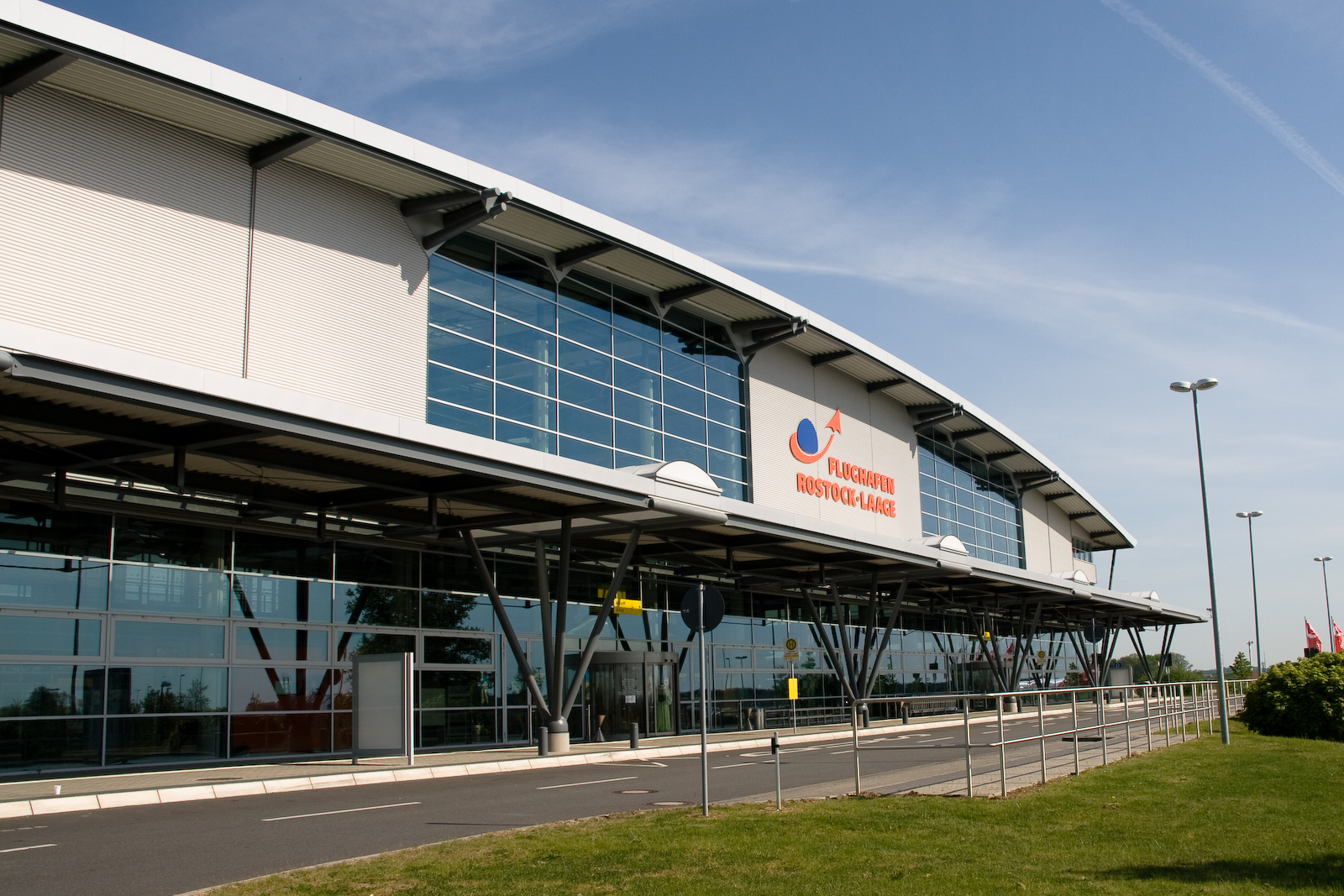
- IATA: RLG; ICAO: ETNL

Summary
- Airport type: Public/Military
- Operator: Flughafen Rostock Laage-Güstrow GmbH
- Serves: Rostock, Germany
- Elevation AMSL: 42 m (138 ft)
- Coordinates: 53°55′06″N 12°16′42″E
- Website: www.rostock-airport.de

Map
- Location of Airport in Mecklenburg-Vorpommern

Runways
Direction	Length		Surface
Direction	m	ft	Surface
10/28	2,500	8,202	Paved

Statistics (2022)
- Passengers: 60,997 ▲+185,0%
- Aircraft movements: 15,440 ▲+139,6%
- Cargo (metric tons): 0 ▼-100,0%
- Sources: Statistics at ADV.

Rostock Airport, German: Flughafen Rostock-Laage (IATA: RLG, ICAO: ETNL), is the airport of Rostock, the largest city in the German state Mecklenburg-Vorpommern, and is named after Laage, within the boundary of which it is located. Laage is a town in the Rostock district. It features flights to major cities throughout Germany as well as some leisure routes. In addition to civil activity, Jagdgeschwader 73 of the German Air Force is stationed on the military side of the airport.

== History ==
=== Early years ===
Construction of the airport began in 1979 as a National People's Army facility. It became operational in 1984 with the Fighter Wing JBG 77 and the Navy Fighter Wing 28. It was deactivated by the Bundeswehr in 1990 and was reactivated in 1993 when Jagdgeschwader 73 was posted there. In the same year the Rostock-Laage-Güstrow GmbH begins civilian operations on a 60 hectare section of the airport.

=== Development since the 2000s ===
The airport was expected to post losses of €2.8 million for 2013 while the passenger numbers decreased by 12 percent in the same year. As the government of Mecklenburg-Vorpommern is not willing to give additional financial aid, the airport operator may face bankruptcy in the near future. In October 2014, Rainer Schwarz, a former general manager of Berlin Brandenburg Airport was appointed to the same position at Rostock–Laage Airport.

After the British airline Flybmi, which operated domestic flights to Munich and Stuttgart ceased the operation and declared bankruptcy, Lufthansa took over the route from Rostock to Munich with up to two daily rotations with Bombardier CRJ900 aircraft. However, this service has since been terminated.

In 2019, the airport suffered a sharp downfall in passenger numbers with a decrease by more than half to just 148,000. This was mainly caused by the shutdown of Germania which operated several leisure routes from Rostock. In February 2021, Lufthansa Aviation Training relocated their practical training from Bremen Airport to Rostock.

On the airfield it is a part of the major maneuver held in June 2023, held under the leadership of the German Air Force Air Defender 23.

In November 2024, Condor announced it would terminate their two-weekly, summer seasonal route from Rostock to Palma de Mallorca, citing low profitability.

== Facilities ==
The airport consists of one modern passenger terminal building containing a large check-in hall as well as some shops and restaurants. The building is equipped with two jet bridges and apron positions. Rostock–Laage Airport usually sees traffic by mid-sized aircraft such as the Airbus A320 but is equipped to handle wide-body aircraft up to the Boeing 747-400. It also has several stands for smaller general aviation planes.

== Airlines and destinations ==
The following airlines operate scheduled flights at Rostock Airport:

Airlines	Destinations
Corendon Airlines	Seasonal: Antalya

Additionally, the airport is frequently used for non-public cruise ship charter flights to and from Southern Europe, e.g. operated by ITA Airways, to carry passengers travelling to and from the nearby cruise port of Warnemünde. The nearest major international airports are Berlin Brandenburg Airport 190 kilometres (120 mi) to the south and Hamburg Airport 200 kilometres (120 mi) to the west.

== Statistics ==
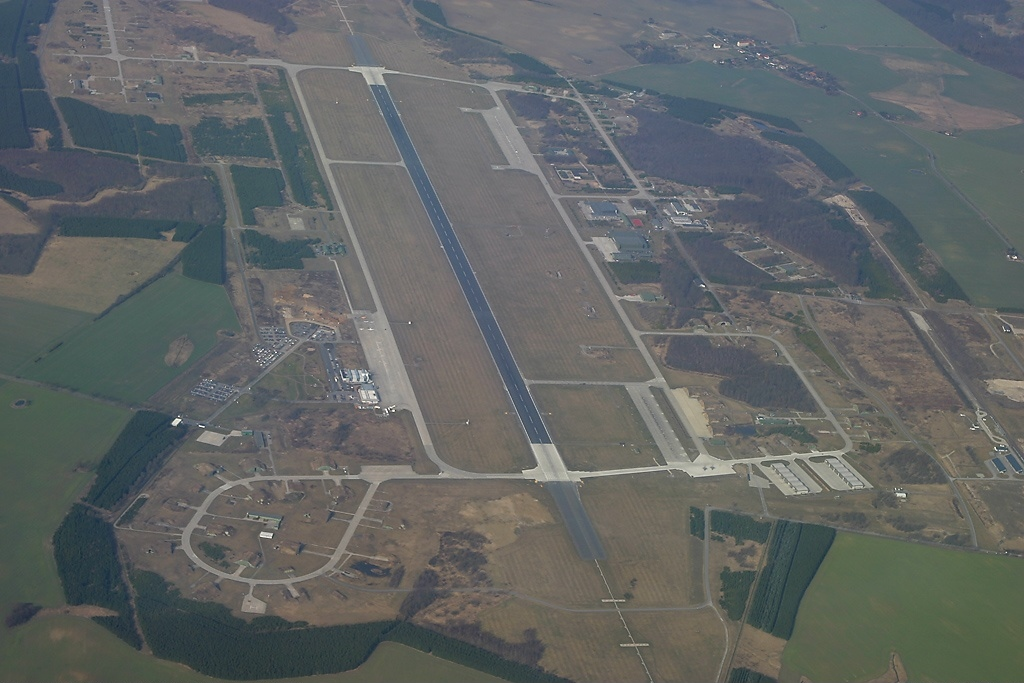
Aerial view

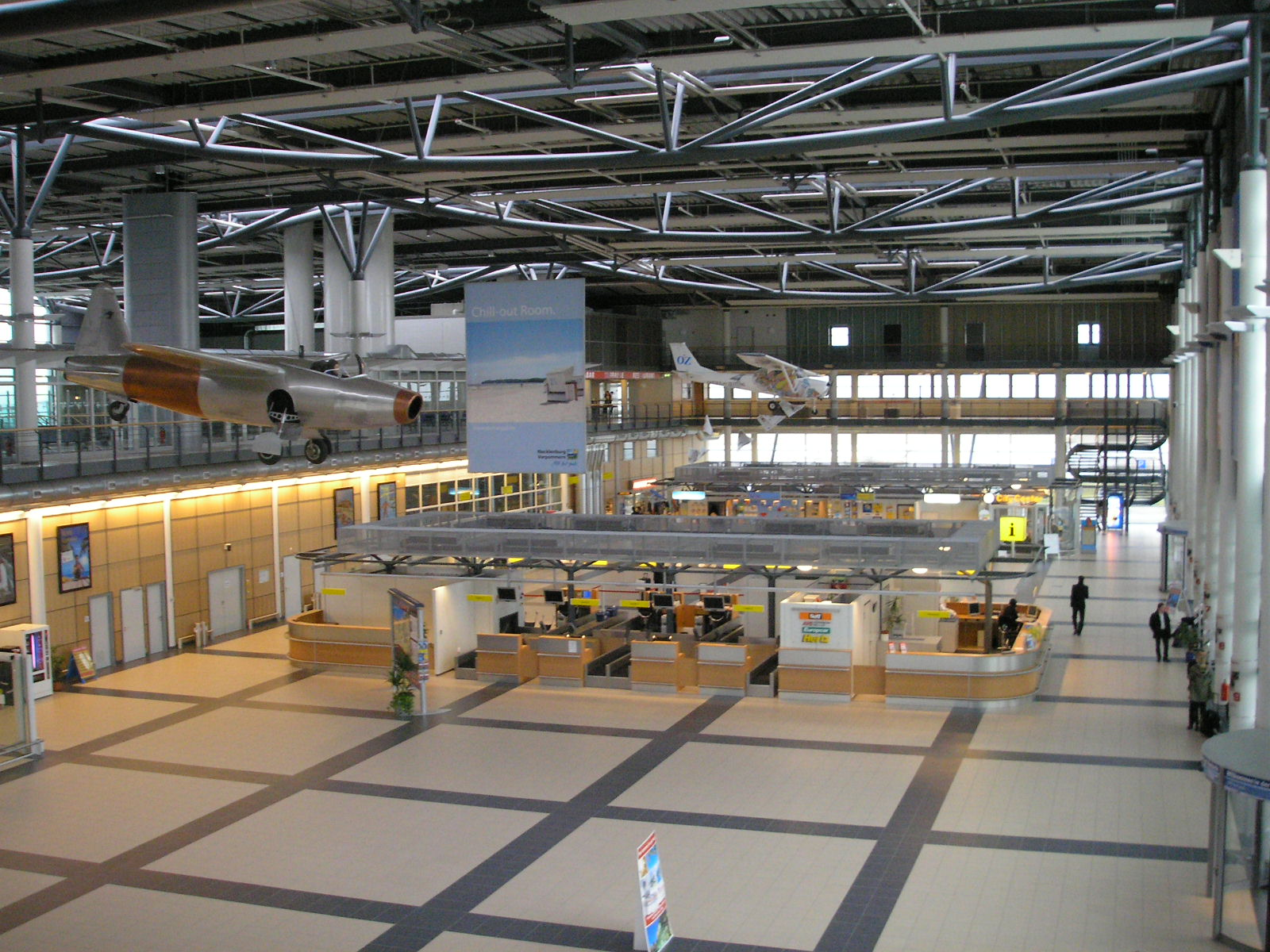
Check-in hall

Busiest Flight Routes from RLG by country in 2023
Rank	Destination Country	Passengers
1	Turkey	16,998
2	Greece	4,394
3	Italy	1,677
This statistic includes only departures. (No arrivals)

Busiest Flight Routes from RLG in 2023
Rank	Destination Airport	Destination Country	Passengers
1	Antalya	Turkey	16,998
2	Heraklion	Greece	4,386
3	Milan-Linate	Italy	1,543
4	Las Palmas	Spain	340
5	Tenerife South	Spain	334
This statistic includes only departures. (No arrivals)

	Passengers
2010	219.489
2011	▲223,516
2012	▼203,990
2013	▼177,464
2014	▼169,946
2015	▲190,869
2016	▲250,199
2017	▲290,654
2018	▲298,000
2019	▼148,000
2023	52,579
Source: Rostock Airport

== Ground transportation ==
=== Public transport ===
For all scheduled and most charter flights, a direct bus connection to Rostock Hauptbahnhof (25 km distance) is provided by the regional public transport company (Rebus). A special fare ("Flughafenticket") is introduced, allowing passengers to use suburban trains and street cars within the city of Rostock for one connecting trip. The same applies for one additional trip on regional busses from Rostock within the integrated fare region of Rostock.

=== Road ===
The motorways A19 (Rostock–Berlin) and A20 (Lübeck–Szczecin) are nearby. There are 4 parking areas at the airport with more than 1,000 parking spots in total. Several international as well as local car rental agencies are located at the airport.

== See also ==
- Transport in Germany
- List of airports in Germany
