= Mladá Boleslav agglomeration =

Area of the Czech Republic

Mladá Boleslav agglomeration Mladoboleslavská aglomerace
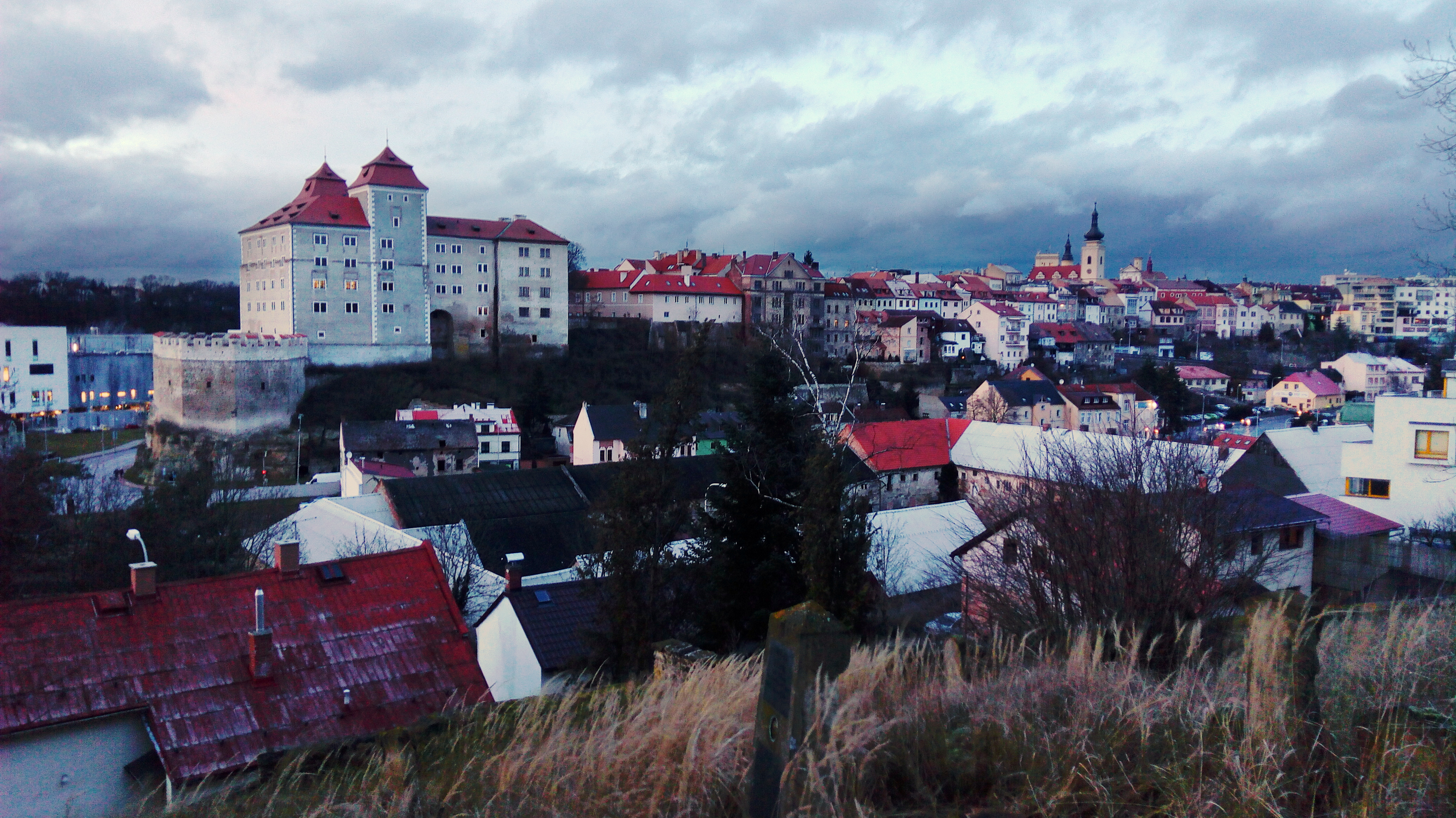
- Skyline of Mladá Boleslav
- Country: Czech Republic
- Region: Central Bohemian
- Largest city: Mladá Boleslav

Area
  - Total: 597 km^{2} (231 sq mi)

Population (2024)
  - Total: 107,282
  - Density: 180/km^{2} (465/sq mi)
- Time zone: UTC+1 (CET)
  - Summer (DST): UTC+2 (CEST)

The Mladá Boleslav agglomeration (Czech: Mladoboleslavská aglomerace) is the agglomeration of the city of Mladá Boleslav and its surroundings in the Czech Republic. It was defined in 2020 as a tool for drawing money from the European Structural and Investment Funds and is valid in 2021–2027. The agglomeration has a population of about 107,000.

== Definition ==
The Mladá Boleslav agglomeration was defined in 2020 by the Ministry of Regional Development of the Czech Republic for the purposes of the so-called Integrated Territorial Investment (ITI), which is a tool for drawing money from the European Structural and Investment Funds.

The territory was defined on the basis of a coefficient composed of three methods: integrated system of centres (i.e. delineation of commuting flows based on mobile operator data from 2019), time spent in core cities (based on mobile operator data from 2019) and residential suburbanization zones (based on statistics of realized housing construction and directional migration from the core of the agglomeration to suburban municipalities in the period 2009–2016). The scope of the territory is valid for the period 2021–2027.

== Location ==
The agglomeration is located in the northern part of the Central Bohemian Region, next to the Prague metropolitan area.

== Municipalities ==
The agglomeration includes 63 municipalities.

Name	Population (2024)
Bakov nad Jizerou	5,316
Bělá pod Bezdězem	4,827
Bítouchov	418
Bradlec	1,430
Branžež	281
Březno	1,064
Březovice	350
Brodce	1,115
Bukovno	788
Chotětov	1,449
Čistá	893
Ctiměřice	143
Dalovice	266
Dlouhá Lhota	491
Dobrovice	3,647
Dobšín	286
Dolní Bousov	2,973
Dolní Krupá	248
Dolní Stakory	329
Horky nad Jizerou	619
Hrdlořezy	748
Hrušov	234
Husí Lhota	159
Jizerní Vtelno	355
Josefův Důl	430
Katusice	831
Klášter Hradiště nad Jizerou	1,018
Kněžmost	2,359
Kobylnice	166
Kolomuty	452
Kosmonosy	5,304
Kosořice	521
Krásná Ves	188
Krnsko	589
Ledce	414
Lhotky	161
Luštěnice	2,255
Mladá Boleslav	46,428
Mnichovo Hradiště	8,950
Němčice	188
Nepřevázka	422
Niměřice	317
Nová Telib	319
Obrubce	239
Obruby	247
Pěčice	220
Pětikozly	92
Petkovy	349
Písková Lhota	1,091
Plazy	509
Plužná	267
Přepeře	117
Řepov	789
Rokytá	364
Rokytovec	183
Semčice	754
Strašnov	303
Strenice	198
Sukorady	387
Vinařice	308
Vinec	276
Žerčice	419
Židněves	429
Total	107,282
