= Přepeře =

Přepeře may refer to places in the Czech Republic:

- Přepeře (Mladá Boleslav District), a municipality and village in the Central Bohemian Region
- Přepeře (Semily District), a municipality and village in the Liberec Region
