= Bukovno =

- Municipality
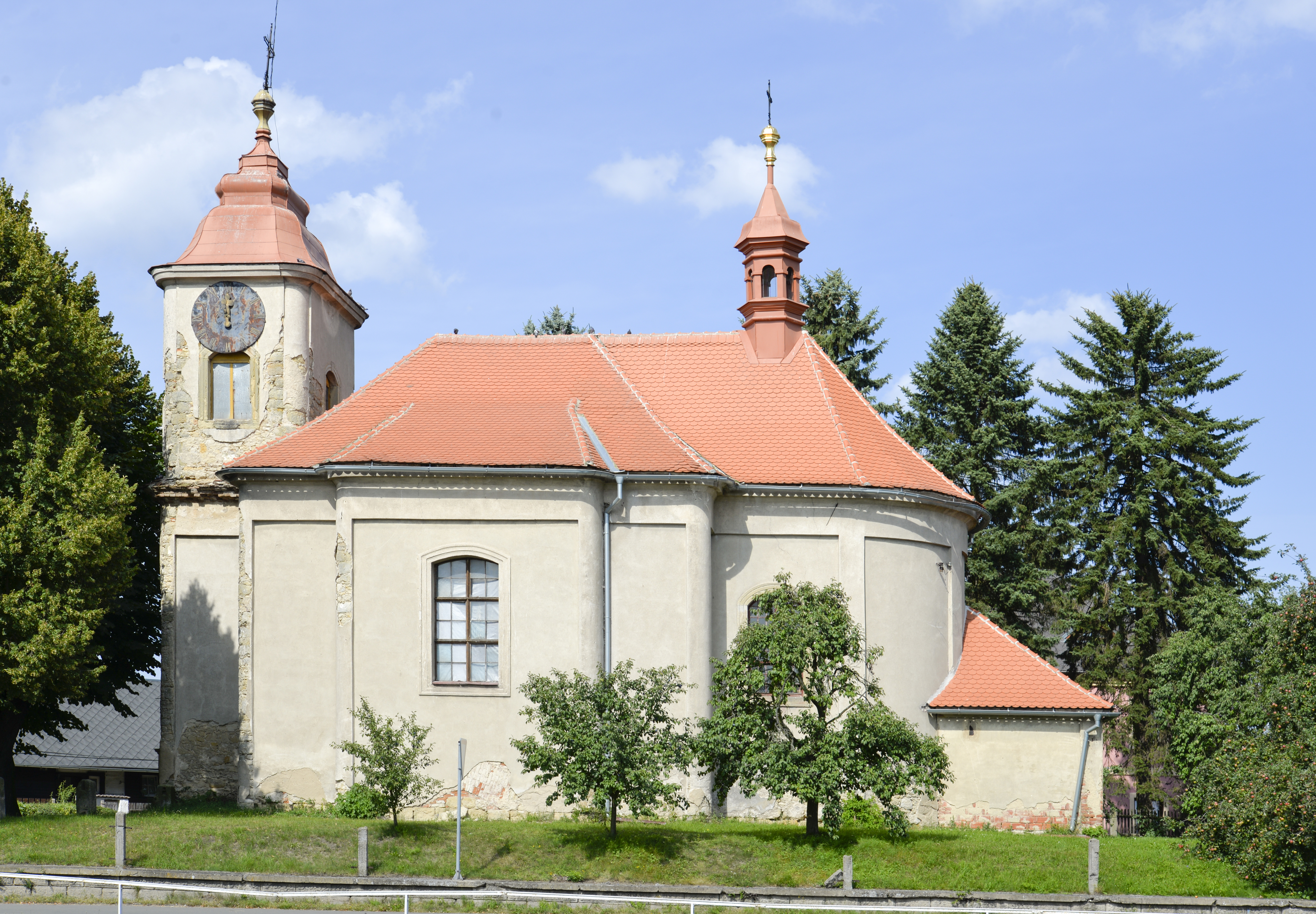
- Church of Saint John of Nepomuk

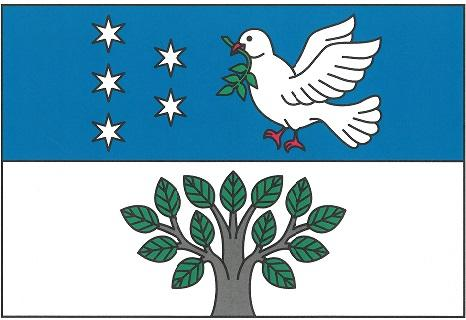
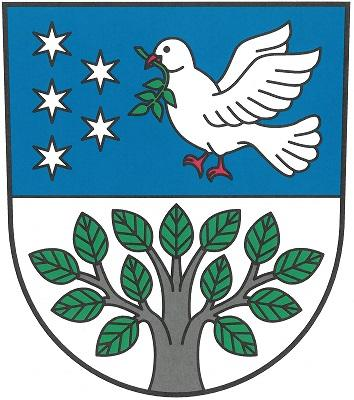
- Flag Coat of arms

- Location in the Czech Republic
- Coordinates: 50°26′49″N 14°50′26″E
- Country: Czech Republic
- Region: Central Bohemian
- District: Mladá Boleslav
- First mentioned: 1380

Area
  - Total: 15.04 km^{2} (5.81 sq mi)
- Elevation: 318 m (1,043 ft)

Population (2026-01-01)
  - Total: 815
  - Density: 54.2/km^{2} (140/sq mi)
- Time zone: UTC+1 (CET)
  - Summer (DST): UTC+2 (CEST)
- Postal codes: 293 01, 294 25
- Website: www.bukovno.cz

Bukovno is a municipality and village in Mladá Boleslav District in the Central Bohemian Region of the Czech Republic. It has about 800 inhabitants.

== Administrative division ==
Bukovno consists of two municipal parts (in brackets population according to the 2021 census):

- Bukovno (562)
- Líny (209)

== Etymology ==
The name is derived from the Czech word buk ('beech') and the adjective bukový.

== Geography ==
Bukovno is located about 6 kilometres (4 mi) west of Mladá Boleslav and 44 km (27 mi) northeast of Prague. It lies in the Jizera Table.

== History ==
The first written mention of Bukovno is from 1380. It was part of the Mladá Boleslav estate, owned by the Michalovice family until 1468. In 1584, Bukovno was bought by the Czernin family and annexed to the Kosmonosy estate. This lasted until 1734, when Bukovno was bought by Jan Gemmrich of Neuberk.

== Demographics ==
Historical population

Year	Pop.	±%
1869	919	—
1880	967	+5.2%
1890	947	−2.1%
1900	939	−0.8%
1910	914	−2.7%

Year	Pop.	±%
1921	974	+6.6%
1930	1,070	+9.9%
1950	736	−31.2%
1961	747	+1.5%
1970	643	−13.9%

Year	Pop.	±%
1980	587	−8.7%
1991	526	−10.4%
2001	560	+6.5%
2011	675	+20.5%
2021	771	+14.2%

Source: Censuses

== Transport ==
Bukovno is located on the railway line Mělník–Mladějov, but in the off season it is only in operation on weekends.

== Sights ==
The main landmark of Bukovno is the Church of Saint John of Nepomuk. It was built in the Baroque style in 1769.
