= Obrubce =

- Municipality
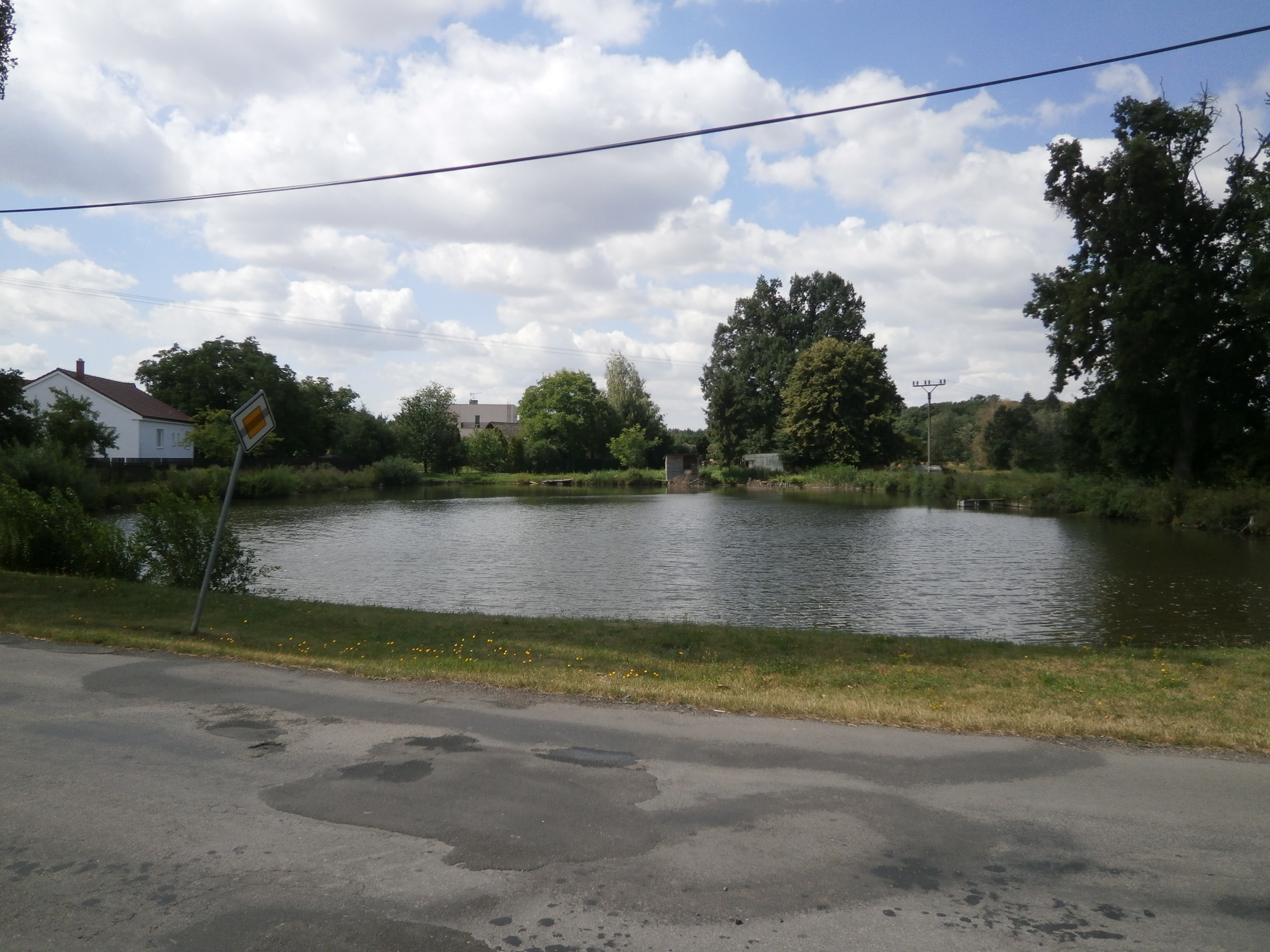
- Halamka pond

- Location in the Czech Republic
- Coordinates: 50°26′53″N 15°3′49″E
- Country: Czech Republic
- Region: Central Bohemian
- District: Mladá Boleslav
- First mentioned: 1335

Area
  - Total: 7.65 km^{2} (2.95 sq mi)
- Elevation: 234 m (768 ft)

Population (2026-01-01)
  - Total: 256
  - Density: 33.5/km^{2} (86.7/sq mi)
- Time zone: UTC+1 (CET)
  - Summer (DST): UTC+2 (CEST)
- Postal code: 294 04
- Website: www.obrubce.e-obec.cz

Obrubce is a municipality and village in Mladá Boleslav District in the Central Bohemian Region of the Czech Republic. It has about 300 inhabitants.

== Administrative division ==
Obrubce consists of two municipal parts (in brackets population according to the 2021 census):

- Obrubce (174)
- Obora (70)

== Etymology ==
Obrubce is a diminutive form of Obruby, which is a village next to Obrubce. The name Obruby was derived from the old Czech word obrub, which can be translated as 'border', 'edge' or 'wall'.

== Geography ==
Obrubce is located about 11 kilometres (7 mi) east of Mladá Boleslav and 54 km (34 mi) northeast of Prague. It lies in the Jičín Uplands. The highest point is at 251 m (823 ft) above sea level. The stream Přepeřský potok flows through the municipality. The western part of the municipal territory is rich in small fishponds.

== History ==
The first written mention of Obrubce is from 1335. Until 1519, the village was owned by various local noble families. In 1519, Obrubce was bought by the Krajíř of Krajek family and joined to the Mladá Boleslav estate.

== Demographics ==
Historical population

Year	Pop.	±%
1869	455	—
1880	466	+2.4%
1890	448	−3.9%
1900	439	−2.0%
1910	401	−8.7%

Year	Pop.	±%
1921	380	−5.2%
1930	379	−0.3%
1950	282	−25.6%
1961	339	+20.2%
1970	291	−14.2%

Year	Pop.	±%
1980	263	−9.6%
1991	225	−14.4%
2001	181	−19.6%
2011	189	+4.4%
2021	244	+29.1%

Source: Censuses

== Transport ==
The I/16 road (the section from Mladá Boleslav to Jičín) runs through the municipality.

The railway that runs through the municipality is unused.

== Sights ==
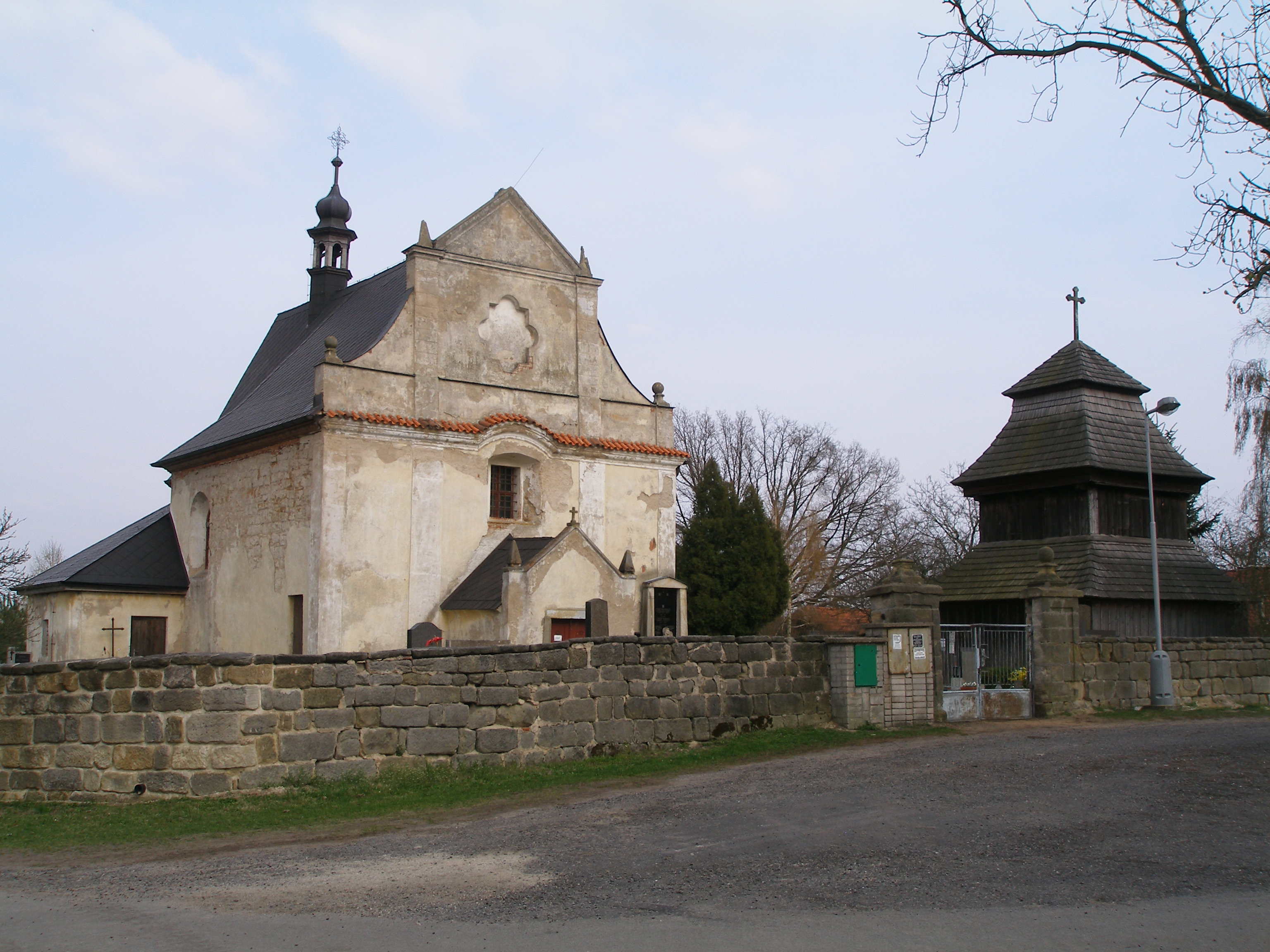
Church of the Holy Trinity

The main landmark of Obrubce is the Church of the Holy Trinity. It was originally a Gothic church built before 1350. Until 1677, it was consecrated to Saints Cyril and Methodius. In the 18th century, the church was rebuilt in the Baroque style. Next to the church is a separate wooden bell tower.
