= Lhotky =

- Municipality
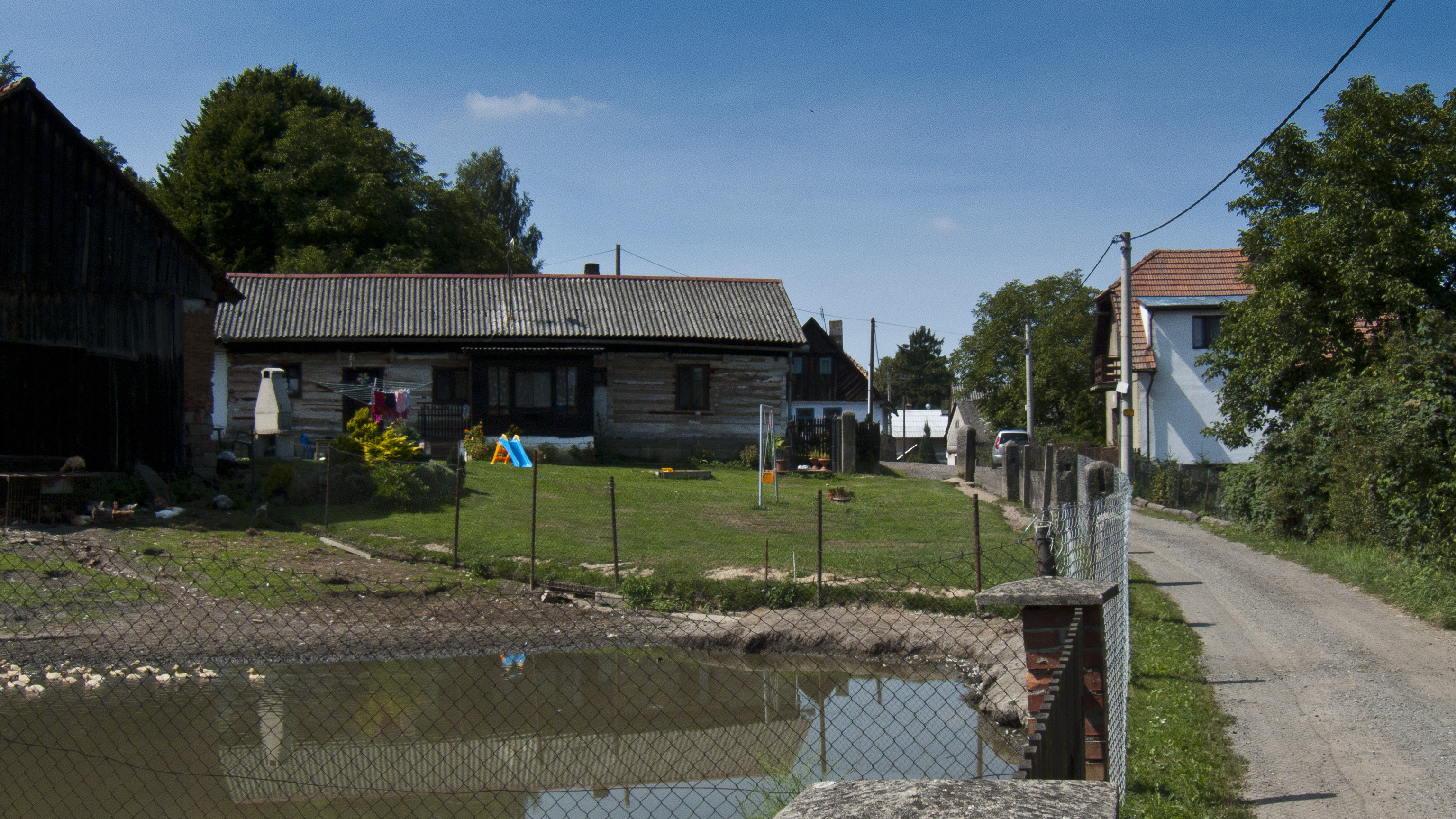
- Side street

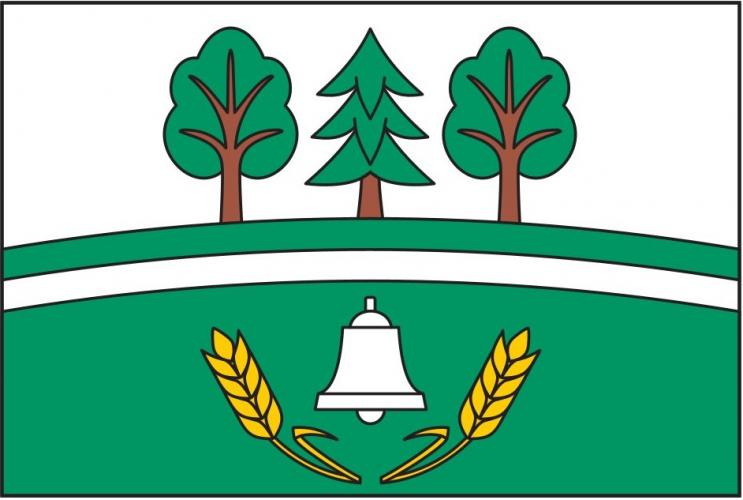
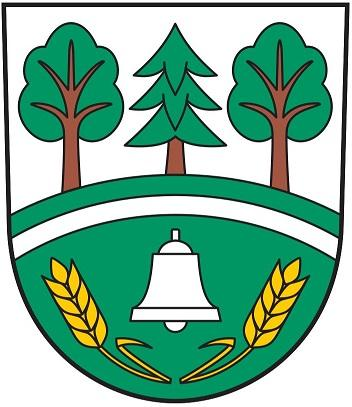
- Flag Coat of arms

- Location in the Czech Republic
- Coordinates: 50°23′47″N 15°3′11″E
- Country: Czech Republic
- Region: Central Bohemian
- District: Mladá Boleslav
- First mentioned: 1406

Area
  - Total: 5.44 km^{2} (2.10 sq mi)
- Elevation: 278 m (912 ft)

Population (2026-01-01)
  - Total: 161
  - Density: 29.6/km^{2} (76.7/sq mi)
- Time zone: UTC+1 (CET)
  - Summer (DST): UTC+2 (CEST)
- Postal code: 294 06
- Website: lhotky.cz

Lhotky is a municipality and village in Mladá Boleslav District in the Central Bohemian Region of the Czech Republic. It has about 200 inhabitants.

== Administrative division ==
Lhotky consists of two municipal parts (in brackets population according to the 2021 census):

- Lhotky (135)
- Řehnice (31)

== Etymology ==
The name is a diminutive and plural form of Lhota, a common name of Czech villages.

== Geography ==
Lhotky is located about 9 kilometres (6 mi) east of Mladá Boleslav and 49 km (30 mi) northeast of Prague. It lies in the Jičín Uplands. The highest point is the hill Křemenice at 336 m (1,102 ft) above sea level. There are several small fishponds in the municipality, supplied by the Trnávka Stream.

== History ==
The first written mention of Lhotky is from 1406. For most of its history, the village belonged to the Březno estate.

== Demographics ==
Historical population

Year	Pop.	±%
1869	311	—
1880	317	+1.9%
1890	324	+2.2%
1900	329	+1.5%
1910	344	+4.6%

Year	Pop.	±%
1921	319	−7.3%
1930	299	−6.3%
1950	203	−32.1%
1961	198	−2.5%
1970	156	−21.2%

Year	Pop.	±%
1980	113	−27.6%
1991	96	−15.0%
2001	118	+22.9%
2011	157	+33.1%
2021	166	+5.7%

Source: Censuses

== Transport ==
There are no railways or major roads passing through the municipality.

== Sights ==
The only protected cultural monument in the municipality is a set of a stone crucifix from the second half of the 18th century with a small wooden belfry.
