= Semčice =

- Municipality
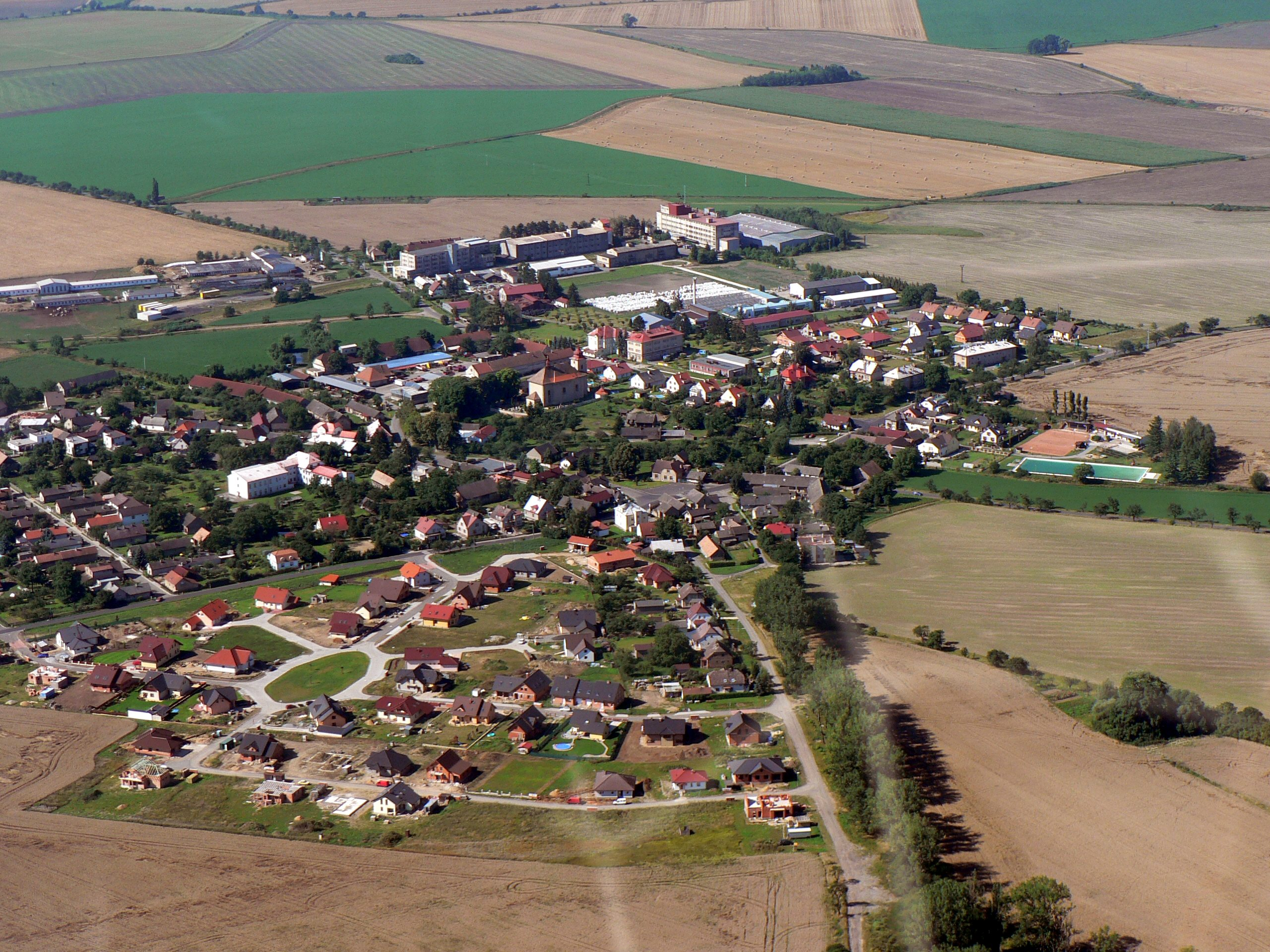
- Aerial view

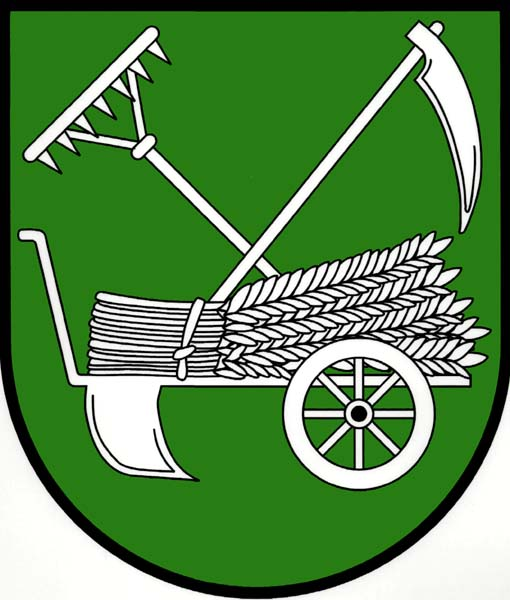
- Coat of arms

- Location in the Czech Republic
- Coordinates: 50°22′6″N 15°0′25″E
- Country: Czech Republic
- Region: Central Bohemian
- District: Mladá Boleslav
- First mentioned: 1297

Area
  - Total: 3.97 km^{2} (1.53 sq mi)
- Elevation: 237 m (778 ft)

Population (2026-01-01)
  - Total: 745
  - Density: 188/km^{2} (486/sq mi)
- Time zone: UTC+1 (CET)
  - Summer (DST): UTC+2 (CEST)
- Postal code: 294 46
- Website: www.obecsemcice.cz

Semčice is a municipality and village in Mladá Boleslav District in the Central Bohemian Region of the Czech Republic. It has about 700 inhabitants.

== Etymology ==
The name is derived from the personal name Semek, meaning "the village of Semek's people".

== Geography ==
Semčice is located about 8 kilometres (5 mi) southeast of Mladá Boleslav and 45 km (28 mi) northeast of Prague. It lies on the border between the Jičín Uplands and Jizera Table. The highest point is at 312 m (1,024 ft) above sea level. The Vlkava River flows through the southern part of the municipality.

== History ==
The first written mention of Semčice is from 1297. Until the 17th century, it was a small estate owned by various less important noble families. After the Battle of White Mountain in 1620, Semčice was acquired by the Waldstein family and annexed to the Dobrovice estate.

== Demographics ==
Historical population

Year	Pop.	±%
1869	357	—
1880	376	+5.3%
1890	435	+15.7%
1900	441	+1.4%
1910	443	+0.5%

Year	Pop.	±%
1921	481	+8.6%
1930	549	+14.1%
1950	520	−5.3%
1961	558	+7.3%
1970	585	+4.8%

Year	Pop.	±%
1980	497	−15.0%
1991	453	−8.9%
2001	488	+7.7%
2011	692	+41.8%
2021	729	+5.3%

Source: Censuses

== Transport ==
There are no railways or major roads passing through the municipality.

== Sights ==
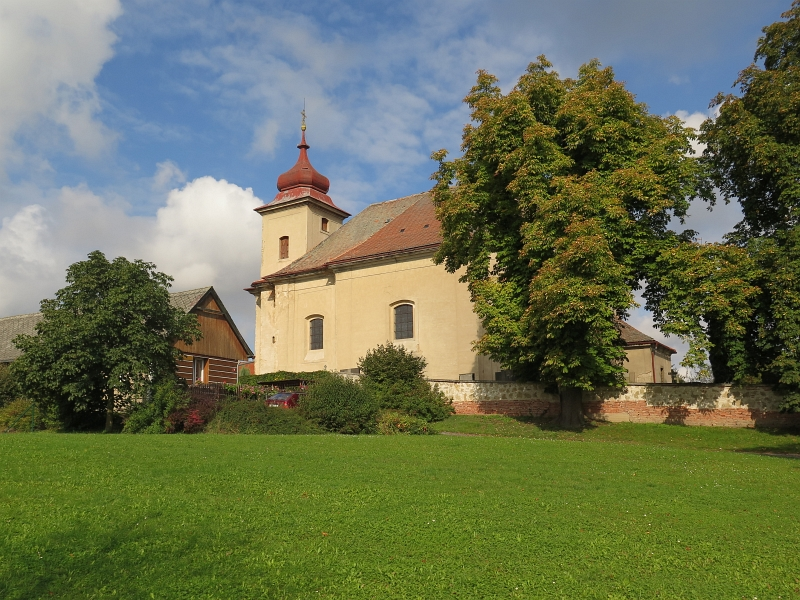
Church of Saint Procopius

The main landmark of Semčice is the Church of Saint Procopius. It was built in the Baroque style in the mid-18th century, according to the design by František Ignác Prée.
