= Židněves =

- Municipality
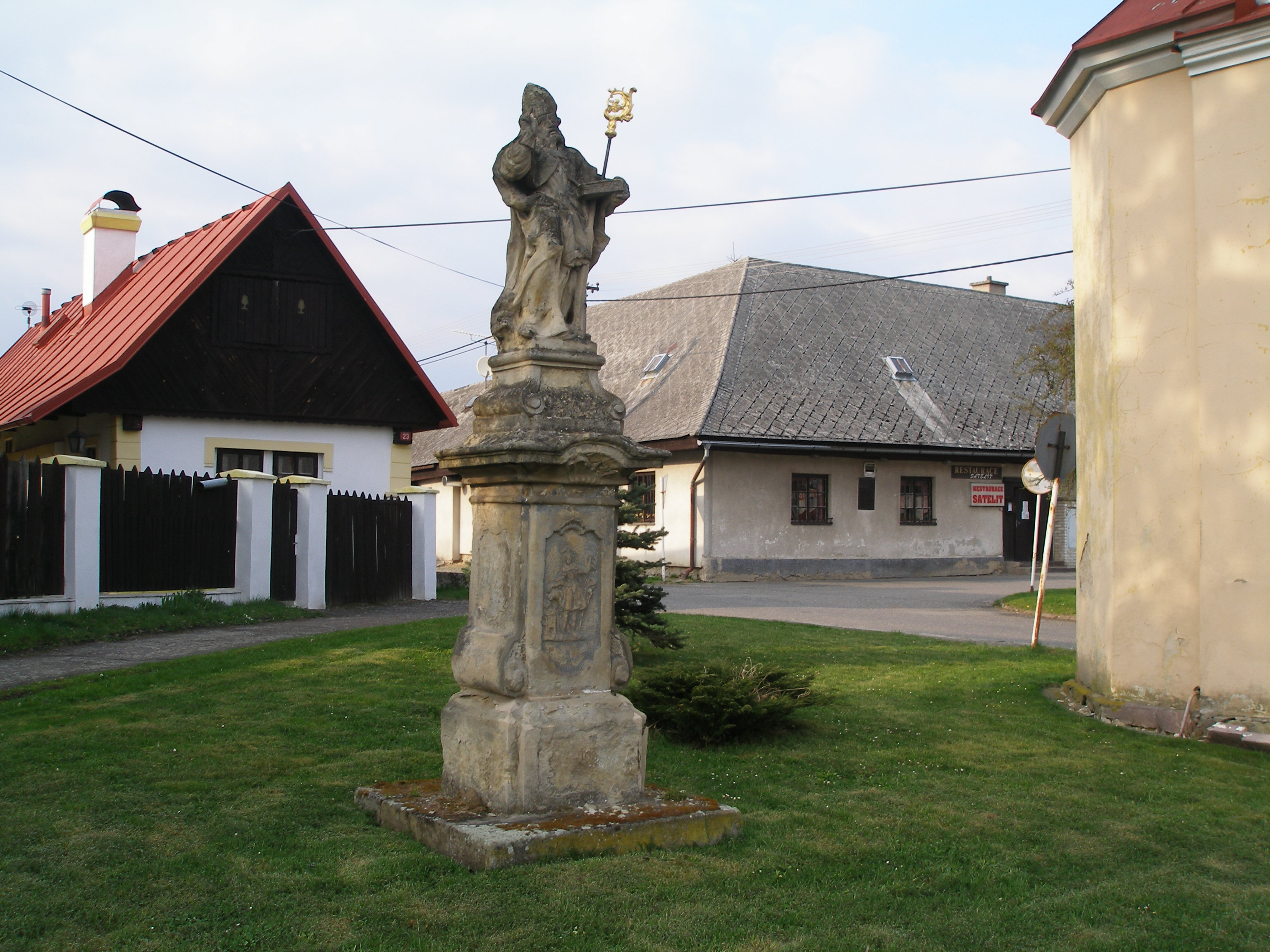
- Statue of Saint Adalbert

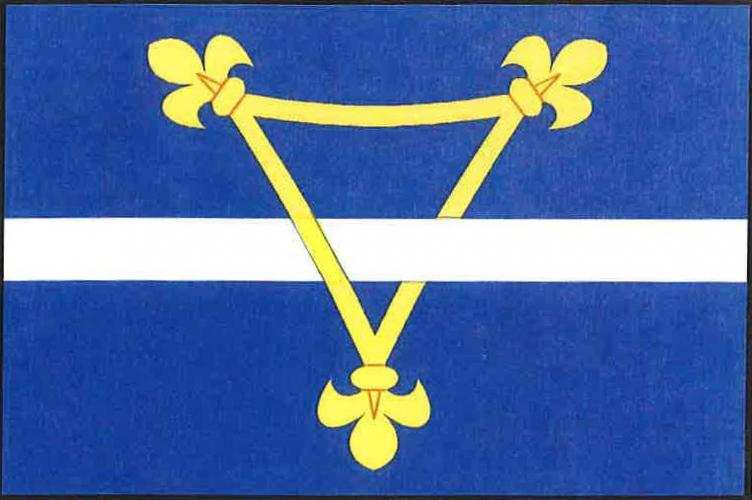
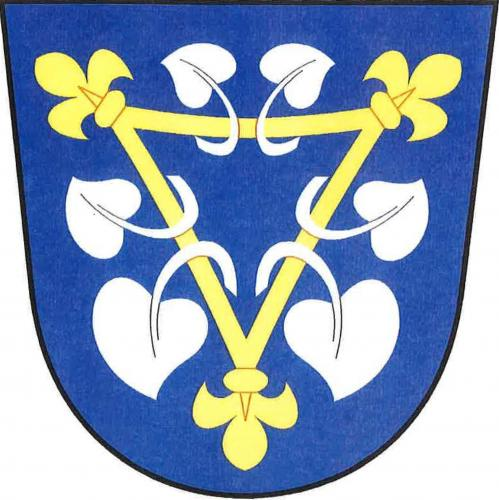
- Flag Coat of arms

- Location in the Czech Republic
- Coordinates: 50°24′42″N 14°59′41″E
- Country: Czech Republic
- Region: Central Bohemian
- District: Mladá Boleslav
- First mentioned: 1255

Area
  - Total: 4.50 km^{2} (1.74 sq mi)
- Elevation: 218 m (715 ft)

Population (2026-01-01)
  - Total: 433
  - Density: 96.2/km^{2} (249/sq mi)
- Time zone: UTC+1 (CET)
  - Summer (DST): UTC+2 (CEST)
- Postal code: 294 06
- Website: www.obeczidneves.cz

Židněves is a municipality and village in Mladá Boleslav District in the Central Bohemian Region of the Czech Republic. It has about 400 inhabitants.

== Demographics ==
Historical population
Year	Pop.	±%
1869	423	—
1880	421	−0.5%
1890	405	−3.8%
1900	405	+0.0%
1910	417	+3.0%
1921	418	+0.2%
1930	400	−4.3%
1950	370	−7.5%
1961	347	−6.2%
1970	318	−8.4%
1980	273	−14.2%
1991	222	−18.7%
2001	225	+1.4%
2011	326	+44.9%
2021	384	+17.8%
Source: Censuses
