= Nepřevázka =

- Municipality
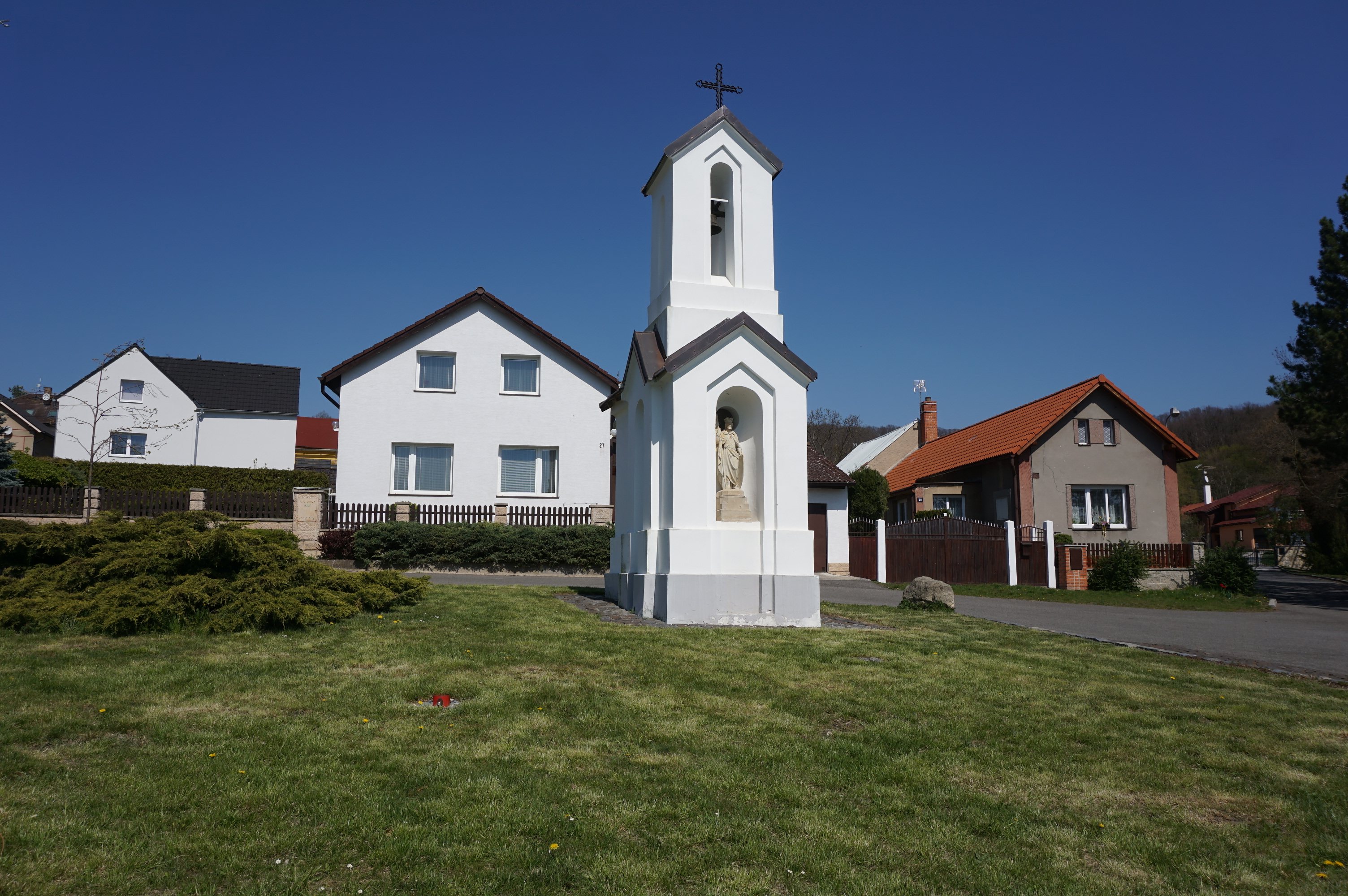
- Chapel in the centre of Nepřevázka

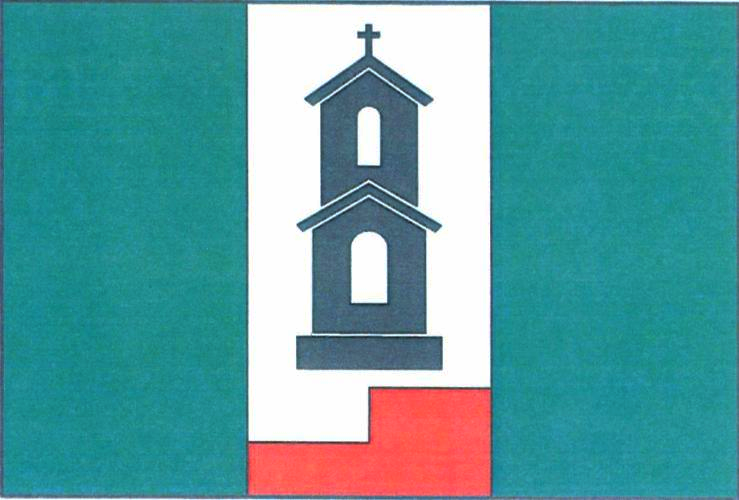
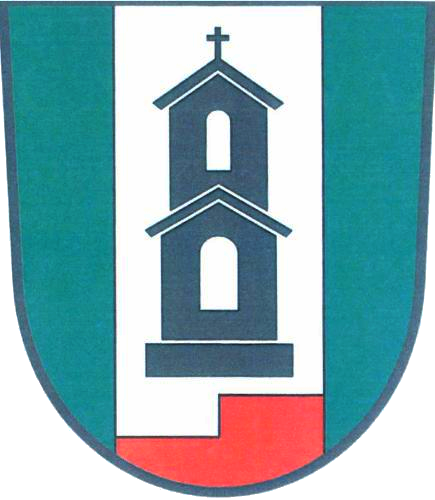
- Flag Coat of arms

- Location in the Czech Republic
- Coordinates: 50°22′42″N 14°54′59″E
- Country: Czech Republic
- Region: Central Bohemian
- District: Mladá Boleslav
- First mentioned: 1225

Area
  - Total: 6.04 km^{2} (2.33 sq mi)
- Elevation: 235 m (771 ft)

Population (2026-01-01)
  - Total: 424
  - Density: 70.2/km^{2} (182/sq mi)
- Time zone: UTC+1 (CET)
  - Summer (DST): UTC+2 (CEST)
- Postal code: 293 01
- Website: www.obecneprevazka.cz

Nepřevázka (Czech pronunciation: [ˈnɛpr̝̊ɛvaːska]) is a municipality and village in Mladá Boleslav District in the Central Bohemian Region of the Czech Republic. It has about 400 inhabitants.

== History ==
The first written mention of Nepřevázka is from 1225.

== Demographics ==
Historical population
Year	Pop.	±%
1869	427	—
1880	479	+12.2%
1890	470	−1.9%
1900	513	+9.1%
1910	471	−8.2%
1921	470	−0.2%
1930	455	−3.2%
1950	357	−21.5%
1961	368	+3.1%
1970	332	−9.8%
1980	294	−11.4%
1991	277	−5.8%
2001	321	+15.9%
2011	420	+30.8%
2021	449	+6.9%
Source: Censuses
