= Vinec (Mladá Boleslav District) =

- Municipality
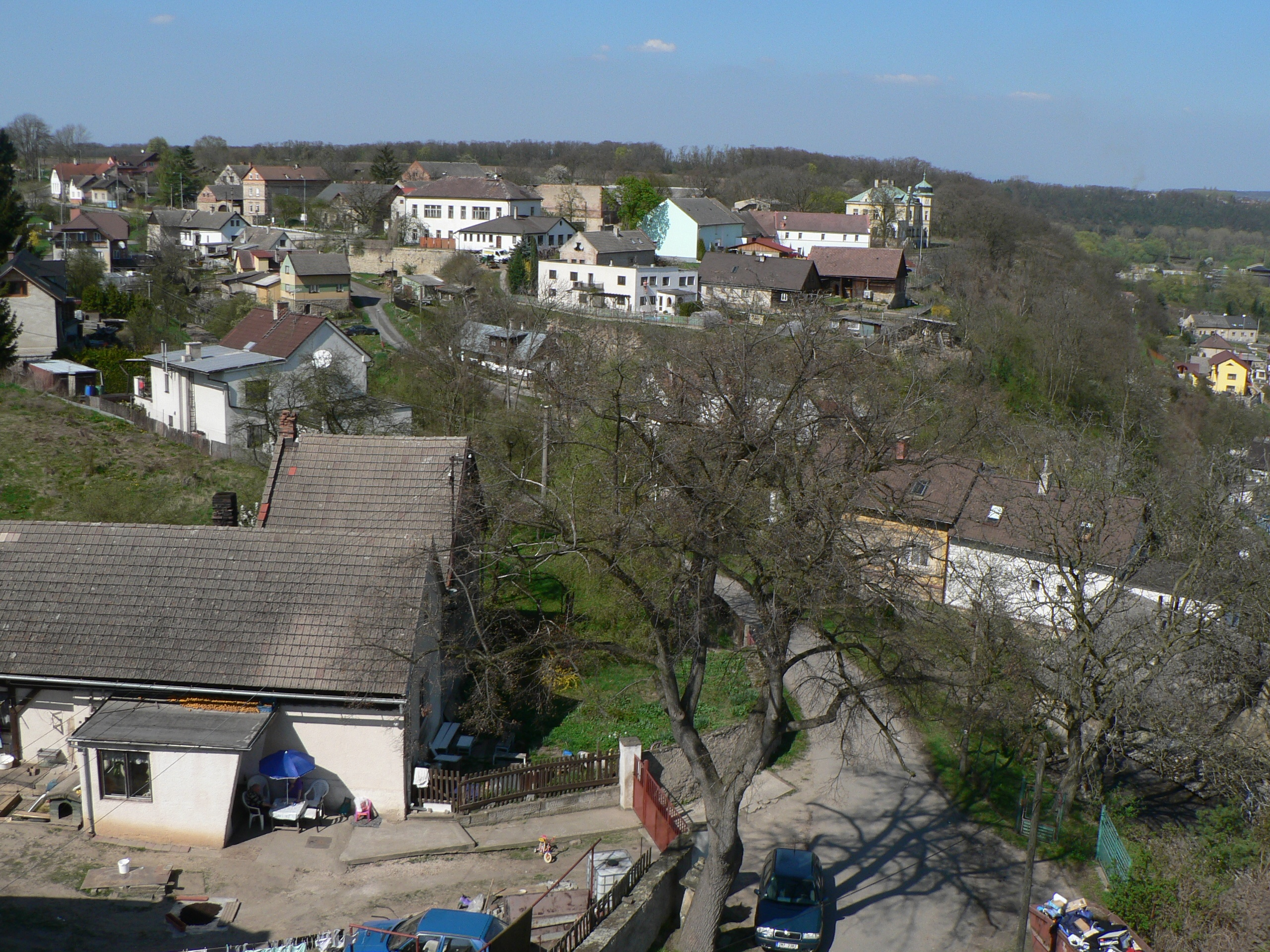
- View from the church

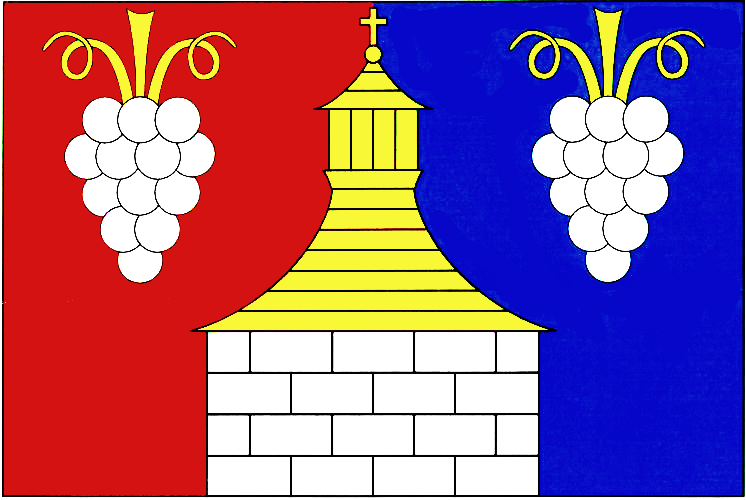
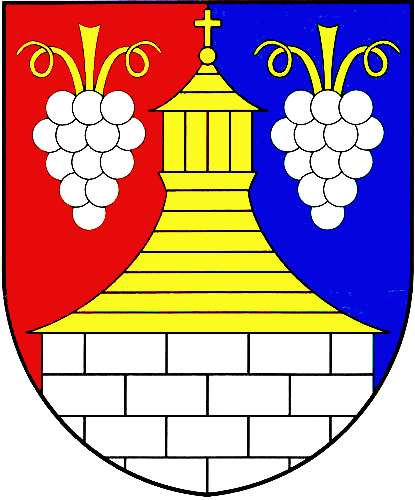
- Flag Coat of arms

- Location in the Czech Republic
- Coordinates: 50°23′41″N 14°52′12″E
- Country: Czech Republic
- Region: Central Bohemian
- District: Mladá Boleslav
- First mentioned: 1352

Area
  - Total: 4.42 km^{2} (1.71 sq mi)
- Elevation: 250 m (820 ft)

Population (2026-01-01)
  - Total: 266
  - Density: 60.2/km^{2} (156/sq mi)
- Time zone: UTC+1 (CET)
  - Summer (DST): UTC+2 (CEST)
- Postal code: 293 01
- Website: www.vinec.e-obec.cz

Vinec is a municipality and village in Mladá Boleslav District in the Central Bohemian Region of the Czech Republic. It has about 300 inhabitants. It is located on the right bank of the Jizera River in the Jizera Table. Vinec is known for the Church of Saint Nicholas, a purely Romanesque building protected as a national cultural monument.

== Etymology ==
The name is derived from either vinice ('vineyard') or the adjective vinný (related to grapevine).

== Geography ==
Vinec is located about 3 kilometres (2 mi) southwest of Mladá Boleslav and 40 km (25 mi) northeast of Prague. It lies in an agricultural landscape in the Jizera Table. The highest point is at 290 m (950 ft) above sea level. The municipality is situated on the right bank of the Jizera River.

== History ==
The first written mention of Vinec is from 1352, but the site was probably inhabited as early as 1165, as this date is found on the local church. In the 14th century, the village was owned by Markvart of Zvířetice, then it was sold to lords of Michalovice. The Vančura of Řehnice family acquired Vinec in the 15th century. In the first half of the 17th century, the Waldstein family bought the village and joined it to the Dobrovice estate.

== Demographics ==
Historical population

Year	Pop.	±%
1869	343	—
1880	362	+5.5%
1890	371	+2.5%
1900	426	+14.8%
1910	449	+5.4%

Year	Pop.	±%
1921	480	+6.9%
1930	538	+12.1%
1950	401	−25.5%
1961	402	+0.2%
1970	366	−9.0%

Year	Pop.	±%
1980	246	−32.8%
1991	198	−19.5%
2001	229	+15.7%
2011	288	+25.8%
2021	266	−7.6%

Source: Censuses

== Transport ==
The railway line Prague–Mladá Boleslav runs through the municipality, but there is no train station.

== Sights ==
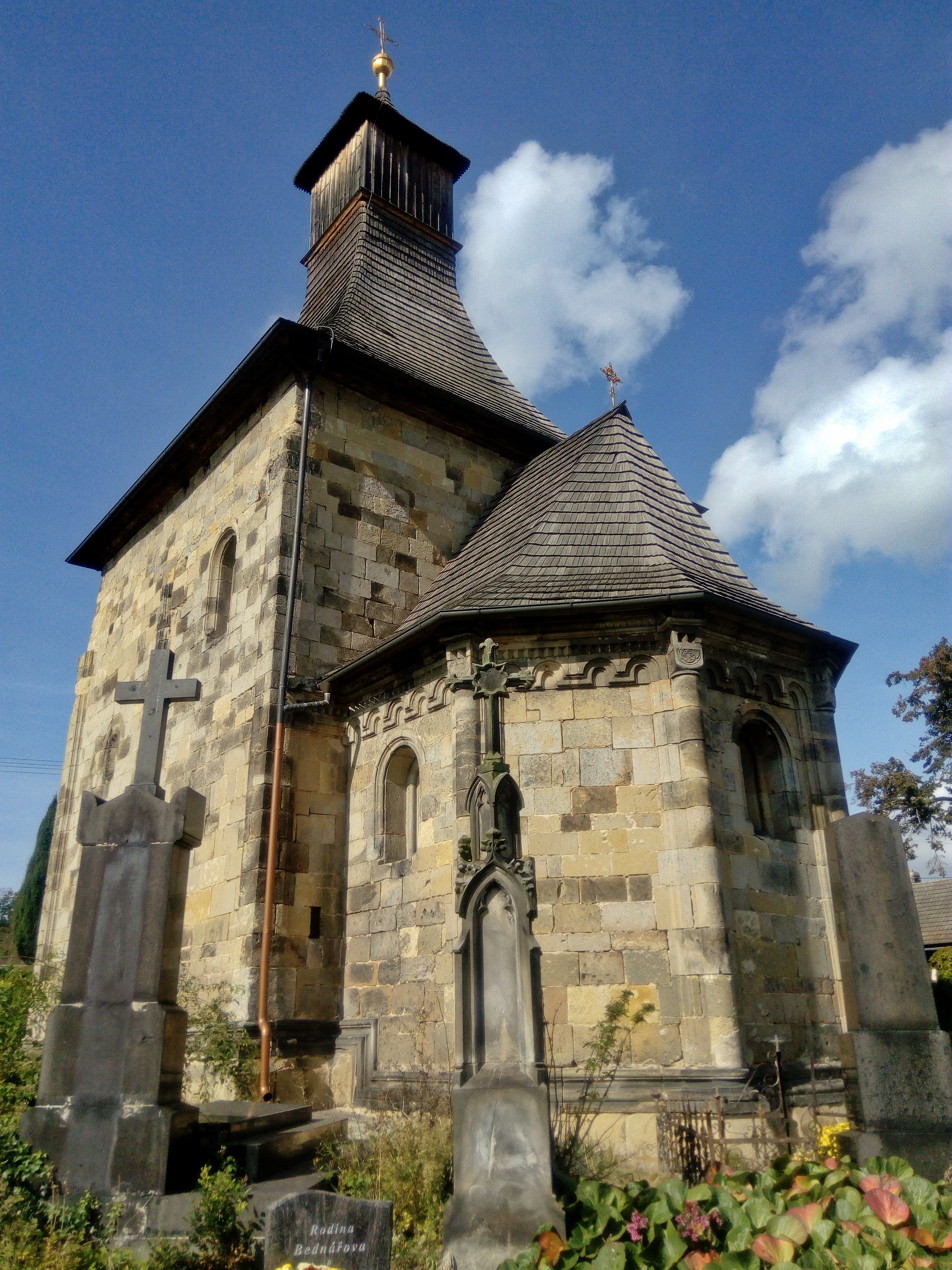
Church of Saint Nicholas

The Church of Saint Nicholas is one of the most important historic buildings in the region, protected as a national cultural monument. This Romanesque church was probably built in 1240, but its core dates from the 12th century. Several reconstructions and modifications were made, but in 1886 the church was cleaned of these reconstructions and its purely Romanesque character was restored.
