= Petkovy =

- Municipality
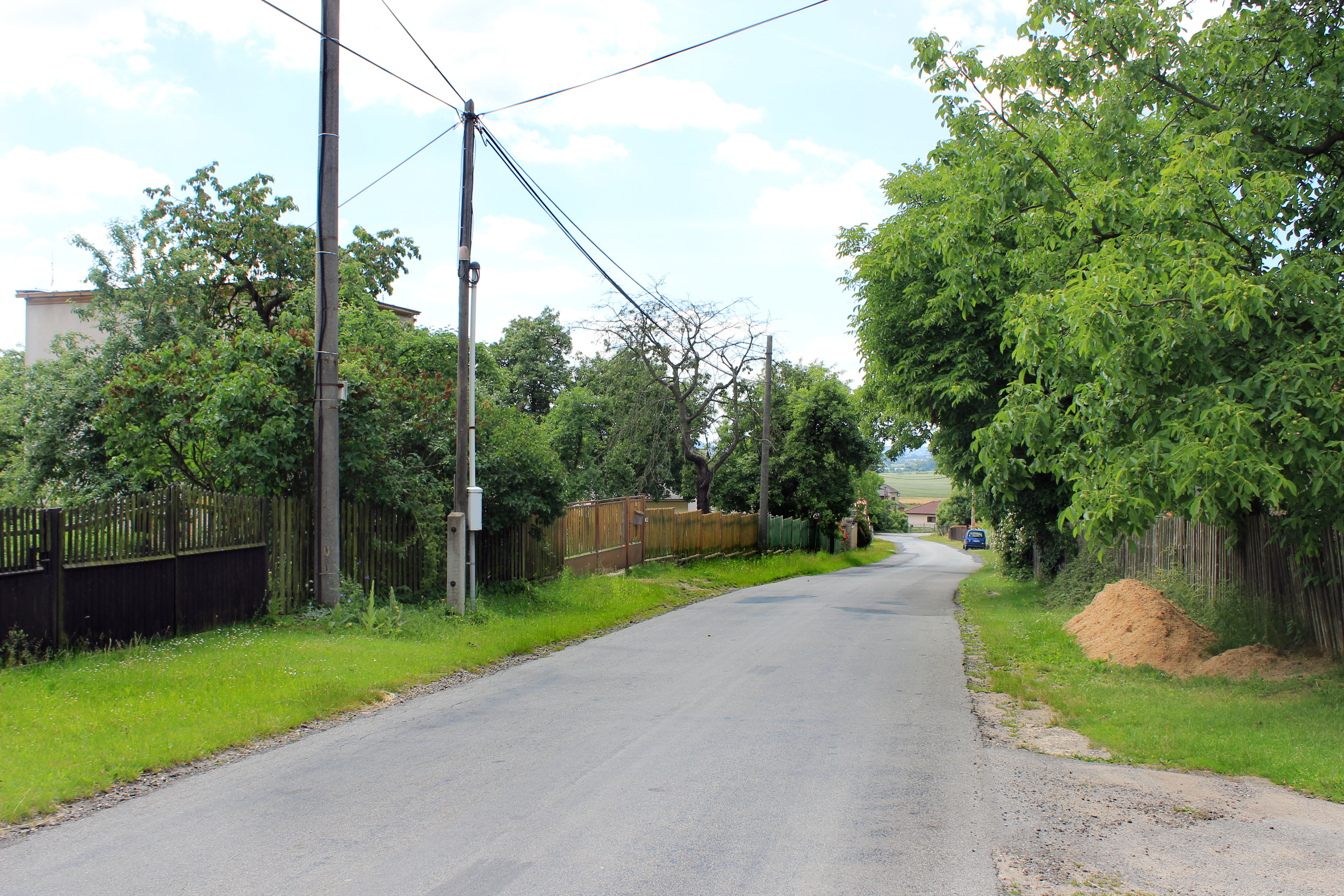
- Main street

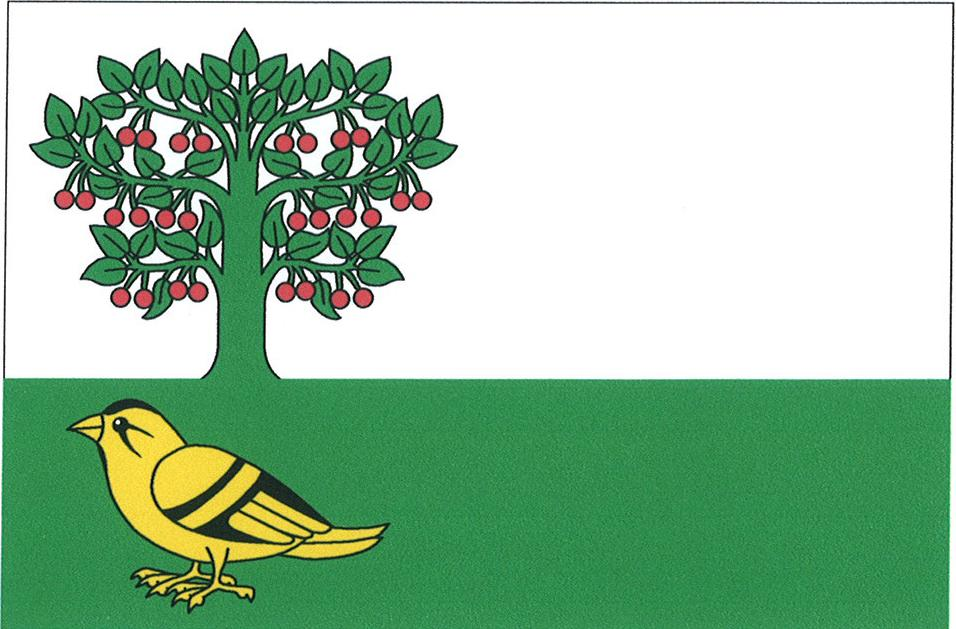
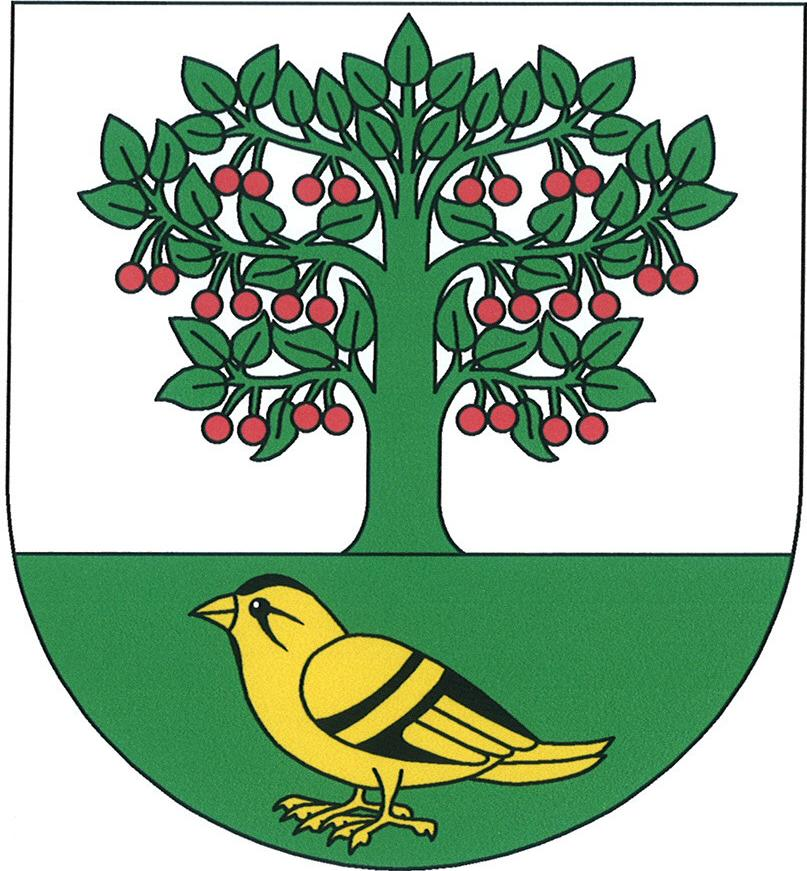
- Flag Coat of arms

- Location in the Czech Republic
- Coordinates: 50°24′48″N 15°4′37″E
- Country: Czech Republic
- Region: Central Bohemian
- District: Mladá Boleslav
- First mentioned: 1393

Area
  - Total: 5.59 km^{2} (2.16 sq mi)
- Elevation: 258 m (846 ft)

Population (2026-01-01)
  - Total: 359
  - Density: 64.2/km^{2} (166/sq mi)
- Time zone: UTC+1 (CET)
  - Summer (DST): UTC+2 (CEST)
- Postal codes: 294 04, 294 06
- Website: www.petkovy.cz

Petkovy is a municipality and village in Mladá Boleslav District in the Central Bohemian Region of the Czech Republic. It has about 400 inhabitants.

== Administrative division ==
Petkovy consists of two municipal parts (in brackets population according to the 2021 census):

- Petkovy (302)
- Čížovky (41)

== Demographics ==
Historical population
| Year | Pop. | ±% |
|---|---|---|
| 1869 | 340 | — |
| 1880 | 326 | −4.1% |
| 1890 | 302 | −7.4% |
| 1900 | 276 | −8.6% |
| 1910 | 298 | +8.0% |
| 1921 | 290 | −2.7% |
| 1930 | 270 | −6.9% |
| 1950 | 259 | −4.1% |
| 1961 | 309 | +19.3% |
| 1970 | 270 | −12.6% |
| 1980 | 231 | −14.4% |
| 1991 | 213 | −7.8% |
| 2001 | 202 | −5.2% |
| 2011 | 281 | +39.1% |
| 2021 | 343 | +22.1% |
Source: Censuses
