= Strašnov =

- Municipality
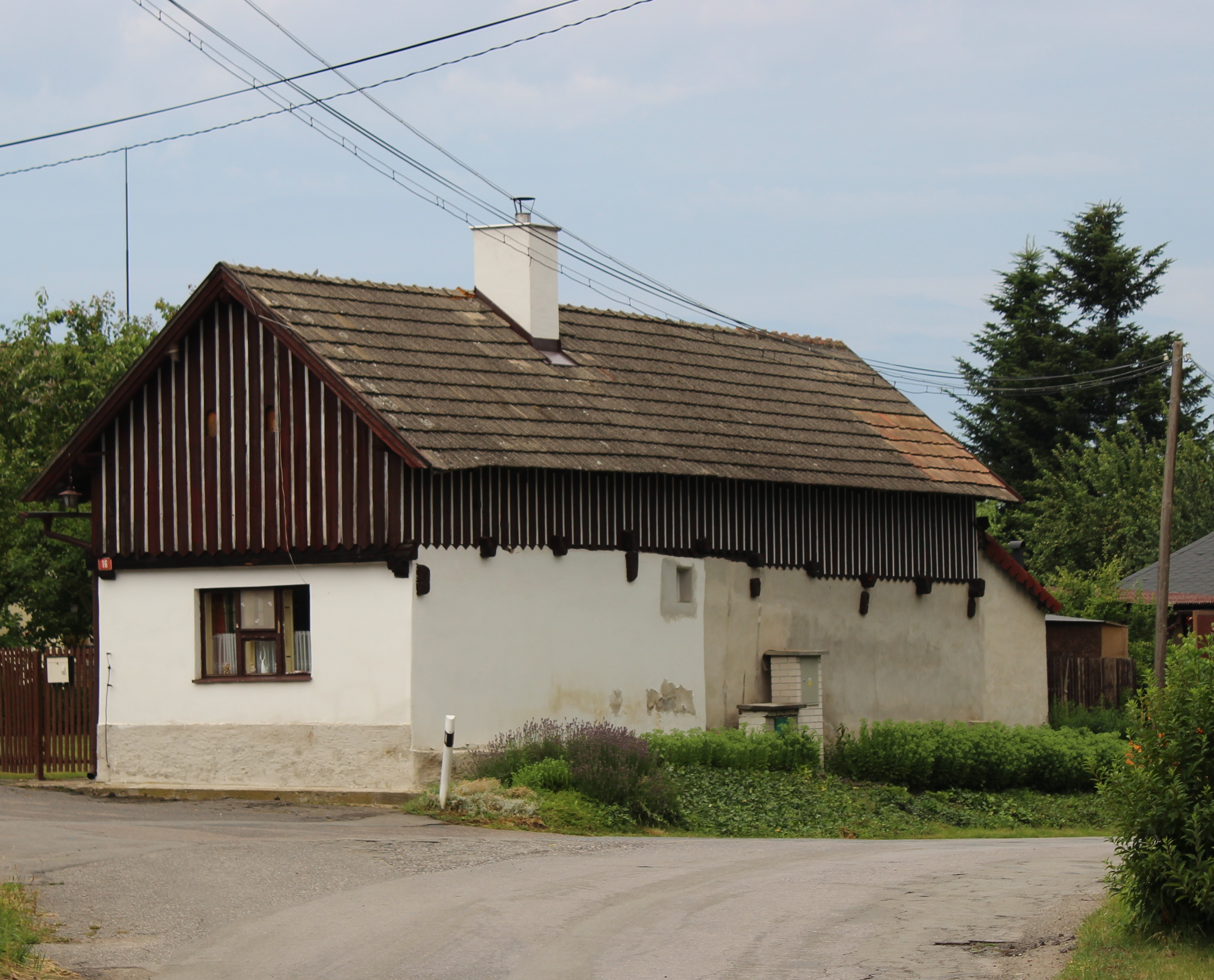
- A house in Strašnov

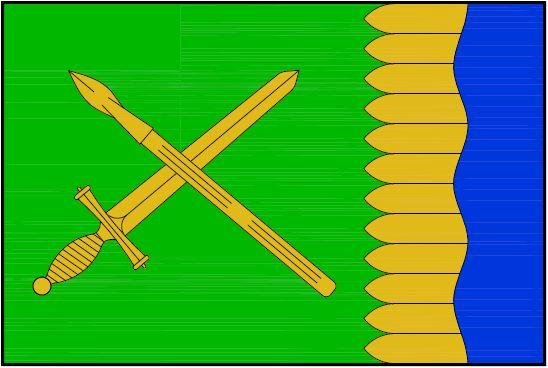
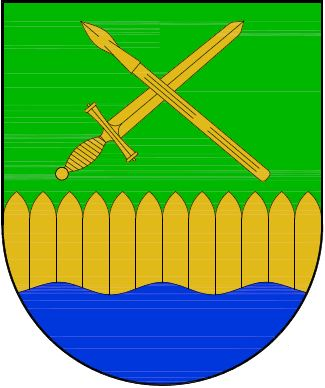
- Flag Coat of arms

- Location in the Czech Republic
- Coordinates: 50°21′6″N 14°53′21″E
- Country: Czech Republic
- Region: Central Bohemian
- District: Mladá Boleslav
- First mentioned: 1297

Area
  - Total: 5.06 km^{2} (1.95 sq mi)
- Elevation: 257 m (843 ft)

Population (2026-01-01)
  - Total: 308
  - Density: 60.9/km^{2} (158/sq mi)
- Time zone: UTC+1 (CET)
  - Summer (DST): UTC+2 (CEST)
- Postal codes: 294 31
- Website: www.obecstrasnov.cz

Strašnov is a municipality and village in Mladá Boleslav District in the Central Bohemian Region of the Czech Republic. It has about 300 inhabitants.

== Etymology ==
The name Strašnov was derived from the personal Czech name Strah or Straš.

== Geography ==
Strašnov is located about 7 km (4 mi) south of Mladá Boleslav and 36 km (22 mi) northeast of Prague. It lies in a flat landscape of the Jizera Table.

== History ==
The first written mention of Strašnov is from 1297. There used to be a fortress, which protected a trade route leading through Strašnov. Most of the territory of Strašnov belonged to the Stránov estate. A small part belonged to the Mladá Boleslav estate in 1576–1614, and from 1614 to the Kosmonosy estate.

== Demographics ==
Historical population

Year	Pop.	±%
1869	229	—
1880	258	+12.7%
1890	271	+5.0%
1900	253	−6.6%
1910	268	+5.9%

Year	Pop.	±%
1921	254	−5.2%
1930	284	+11.8%
1950	219	−22.9%
1961	199	−9.1%
1970	156	−21.6%

Year	Pop.	±%
1980	167	+7.1%
1991	203	+21.6%
2001	246	+21.2%
2011	267	+8.5%
2021	303	+13.5%

Source: Censuses

== Transport ==
The D10 motorway from Prague to Turnov runs along the western municipal border.

== Sights ==
There are no protected cultural monuments in the municipality.
