= Březno (Mladá Boleslav District) =

- Market town
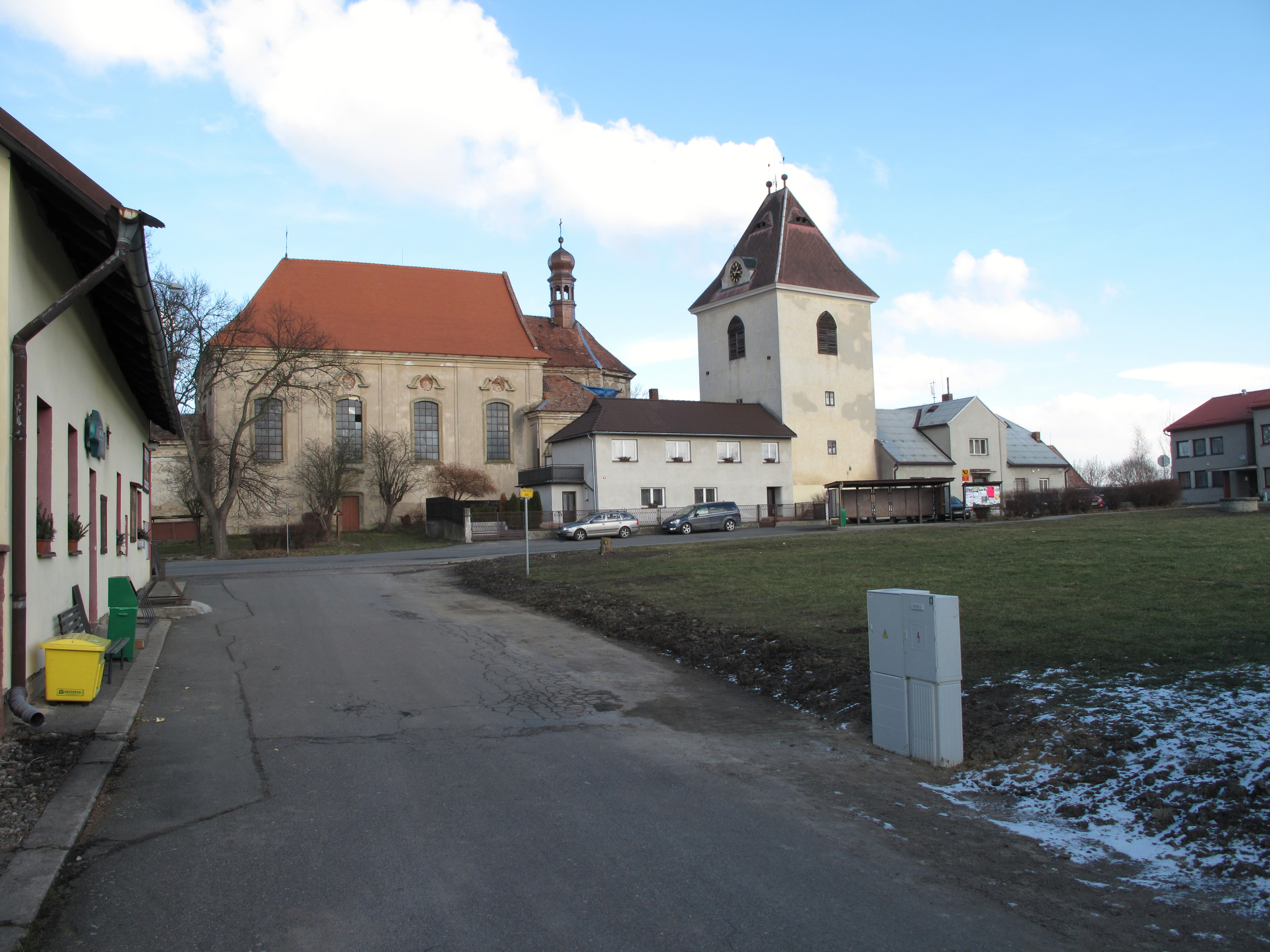
- Centre of Březno with the church and bell tower

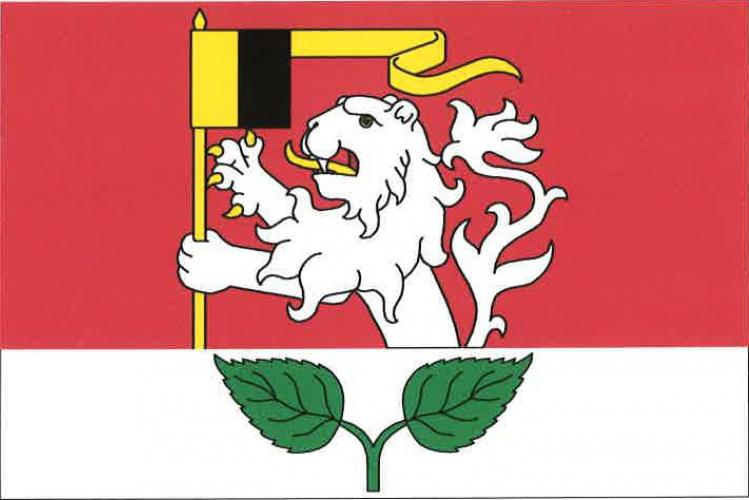
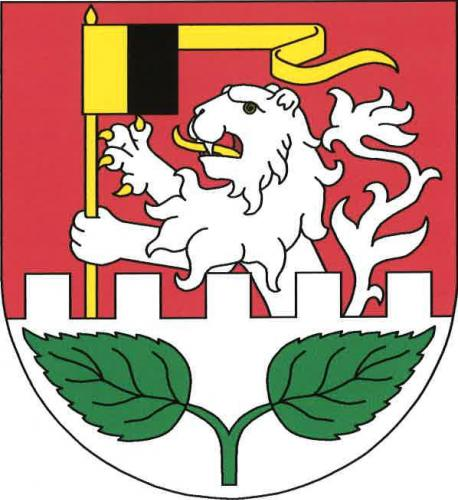
- Flag Coat of arms

- Location in the Czech Republic
- Coordinates: 50°24′23″N 15°0′20″E
- Country: Czech Republic
- Region: Central Bohemian
- District: Mladá Boleslav
- First mentioned: 1255

Area
  - Total: 11.09 km^{2} (4.28 sq mi)
- Elevation: 204 m (669 ft)

Population (2026-01-01)
  - Total: 1,060
  - Density: 95.6/km^{2} (248/sq mi)
- Time zone: UTC+1 (CET)
  - Summer (DST): UTC+2 (CEST)
- Postal code: 294 06
- Website: www.brezno.cz

Březno (Czech pronunciation: [ˈbr̝ɛzno]) is a market town in Mladá Boleslav District in the Central Bohemian Region of the Czech Republic. It has about 1,100 inhabitants.

== Administrative division ==
Březno consists of two municipal parts (in brackets population according to the 2021 census):

- Březno (964)
- Dolánky (44)

== Etymology ==
The name Březno is derived from bříza (i.e. 'birch'), meaning 'birch forest'.

== Geography ==
Březno is located about 6 kilometres (4 mi) east of Mladá Boleslav and 48 km (30 mi) northeast of Prague. It lies in the Jičín Uplands. The highest point is the hill Telib at 322 m (1,056 ft) above sea level. The market town is situated on the left bank of the Klenice River. The municipal territory features several fishponds, the largest of which is Vražda.

== History ==
The first written mention of Březno is from 1255. The village was owned by the Wartenberg family until the 15th century, then different noble families took turns in ownership. In 1561, during the rule of the Bubna of Litice family, Březno was promoted to a market town, but later it was degraded to a village. In 1727, it was again promoted to a market town by Emperor Charles VI.

== Demographics ==
Historical population

| Year | Pop. | ±% |
|---|---|---|
| 1869 | 719 | — |
| 1880 | 738 | +2.6% |
| 1890 | 660 | −10.6% |
| 1900 | 742 | +12.4% |
| 1910 | 673 | −9.3% |

| Year | Pop. | ±% |
|---|---|---|
| 1921 | 723 | +7.4% |
| 1930 | 780 | +7.9% |
| 1950 | 586 | −24.9% |
| 1961 | 617 | +5.3% |
| 1970 | 607 | −1.6% |

| Year | Pop. | ±% |
|---|---|---|
| 1980 | 580 | −4.4% |
| 1991 | 596 | +2.8% |
| 2001 | 585 | −1.8% |
| 2011 | 932 | +59.3% |
| 2021 | 1,008 | +8.2% |

Source: Censuses

== Transport ==
The I/16 road (the section from Mladá Boleslav to Jičín) runs along the northern municipal border.

Březno is located on the railway line Mladá Boleslav–Mladějov.

== Sights ==
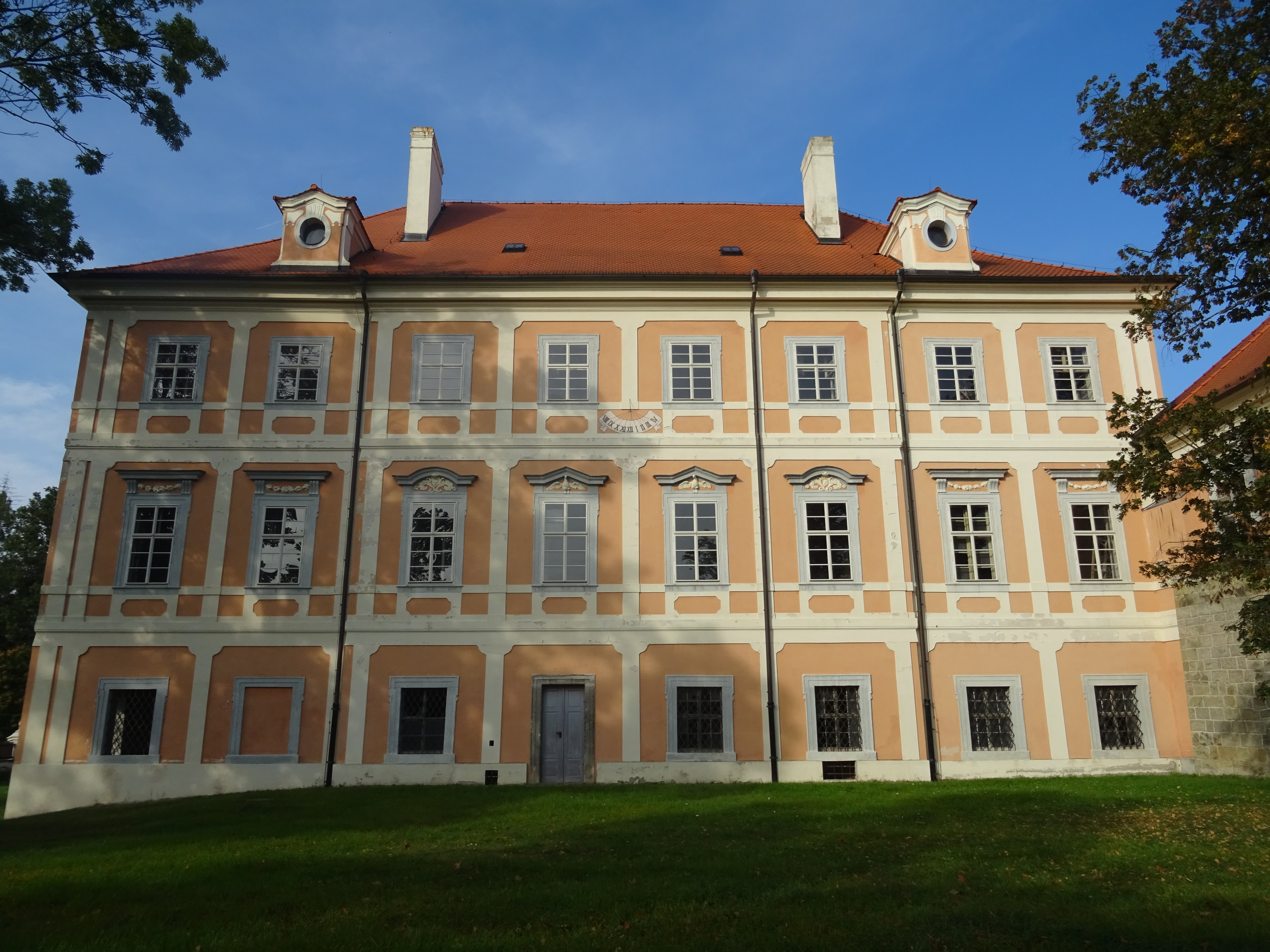
Březno Castle

The old dilapidated castle in Březno burned down in 1765 and a new, larger late Baroque castle was built in its place. The complex includes a castle, a historic carriage house and a large park. The castle is inaccessible to the public.

The Church of Saint Wenceslaus is a Baroque building from 1718, located next to the castle. A brick bell tower stands separately nearby. The bell tower was part of the old castle and dates from the early 16th century.
