= Němčice (Mladá Boleslav District) =

- Municipality
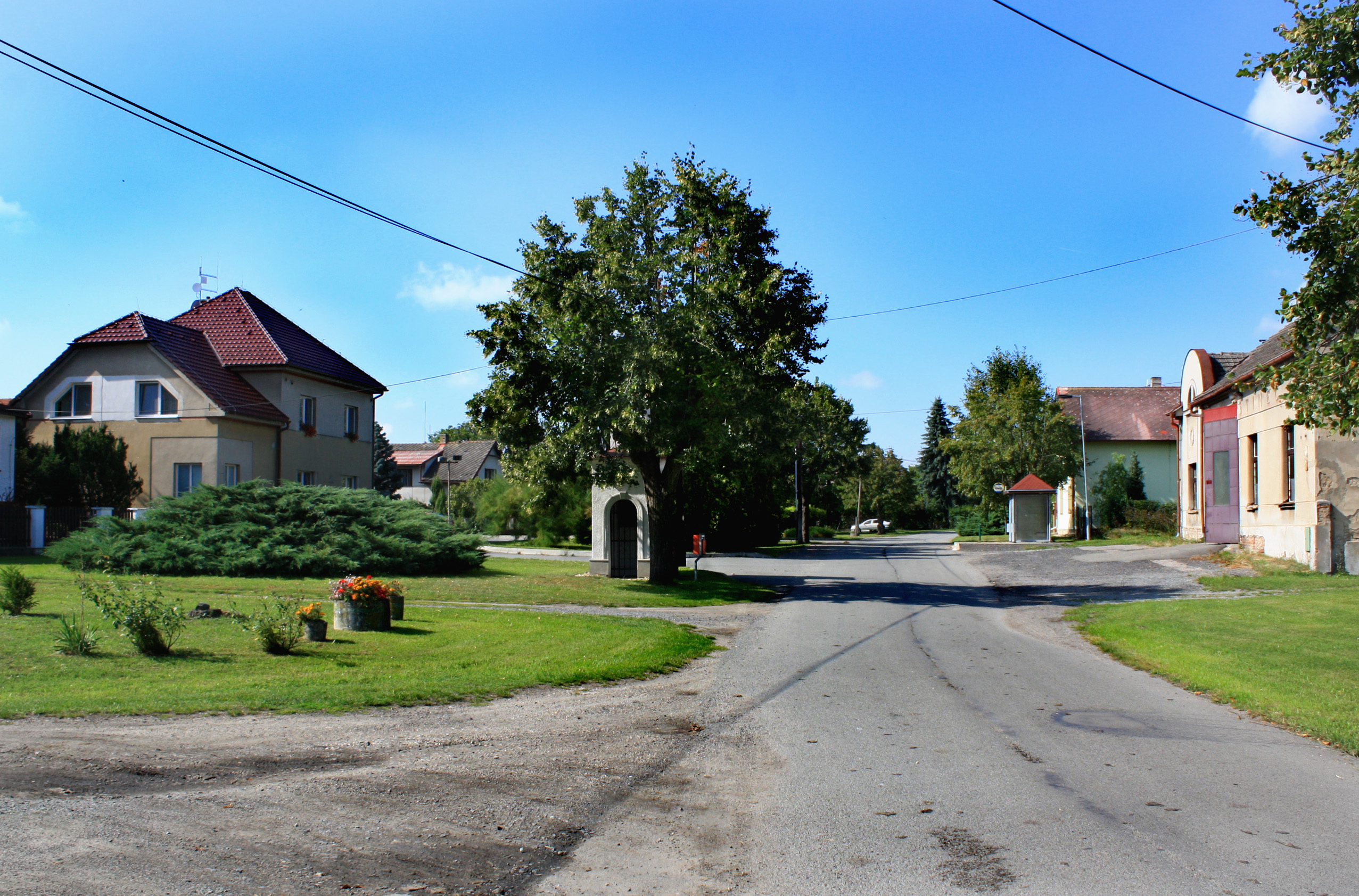
- Centre of Němčice

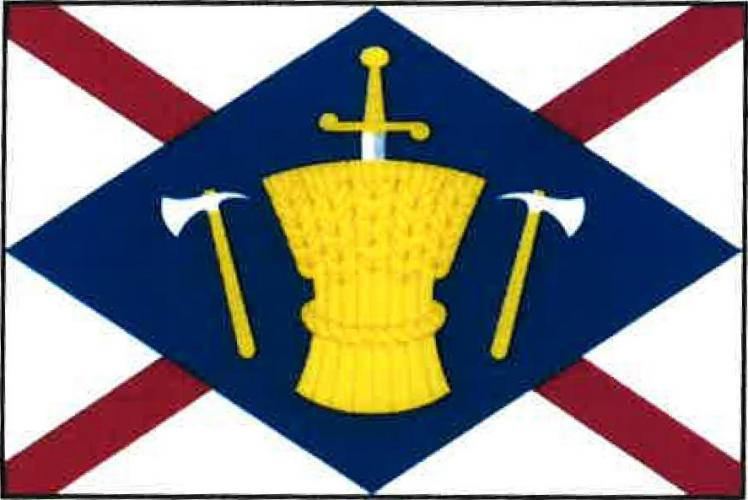
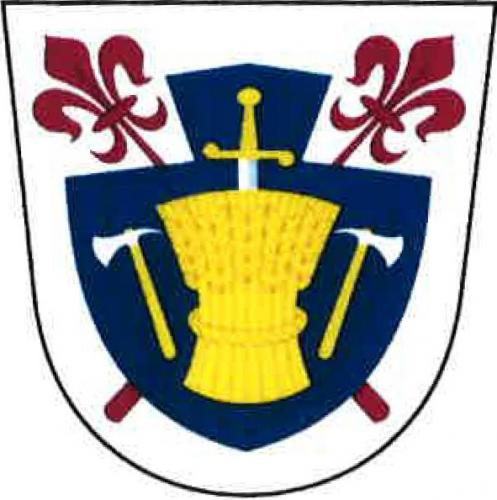
- Flag Coat of arms

- Location in the Czech Republic
- Coordinates: 50°20′49″N 14°55′36″E
- Country: Czech Republic
- Region: Central Bohemian
- District: Mladá Boleslav
- First mentioned: 1338

Area
  - Total: 2.92 km^{2} (1.13 sq mi)
- Elevation: 214 m (702 ft)

Population (2026-01-01)
  - Total: 187
  - Density: 64.0/km^{2} (166/sq mi)
- Time zone: UTC+1 (CET)
  - Summer (DST): UTC+2 (CEST)
- Postal code: 294 42
- Website: www.nemcice-mb.cz

Němčice is a municipality and village in Mladá Boleslav District in the Central Bohemian Region of the Czech Republic. It has about 200 inhabitants.

== Etymology ==
The name is derived from the personal name Němec, meaning "the village of Němec's people".

== Geography ==
Němčice is located about 8 kilometres (5 mi) south of Mladá Boleslav and 39 km (24 mi) northeast of Prague. It lies in a flat agricultural landscape in the Jizera Table. A fishpond called Svárovský rybník is situated in the eastern tip of the municipal territory.

== History ==
The first written mention of Němčice is from 1338.

== Demographics ==
Historical population

Year	Pop.	±%
1869	169	—
1880	188	+11.2%
1890	197	+4.8%
1900	191	−3.0%
1910	252	+31.9%

Year	Pop.	±%
1921	257	+2.0%
1930	270	+5.1%
1950	216	−20.0%
1961	233	+7.9%
1970	189	−18.9%

Year	Pop.	±%
1980	166	−12.2%
1991	153	−7.8%
2001	136	−11.1%
2011	183	+34.6%
2021	199	+8.7%

Source: Censuses

== Transport ==
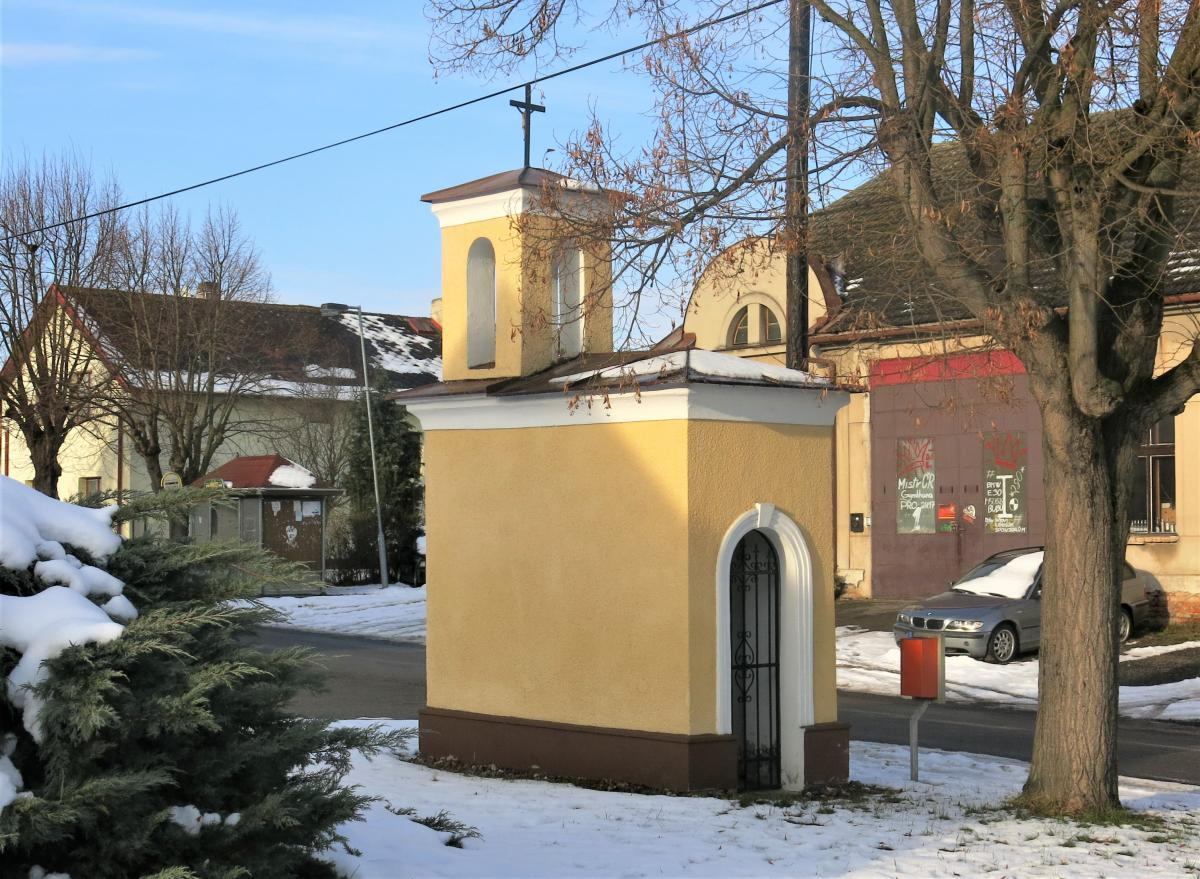
Chapel in Němčice

The I/38 road (the section from Mladá Boleslav to Nymburk) runs through the municipality. The train station in Dobrovice on the railway line Mladá Boleslav–Nymburk is located east of Němčice, just outside the municipality.

== Sights ==
There are no protected cultural monuments in the municipality. In the centre of the village is a chapel.
