= Brodce =

- Market town
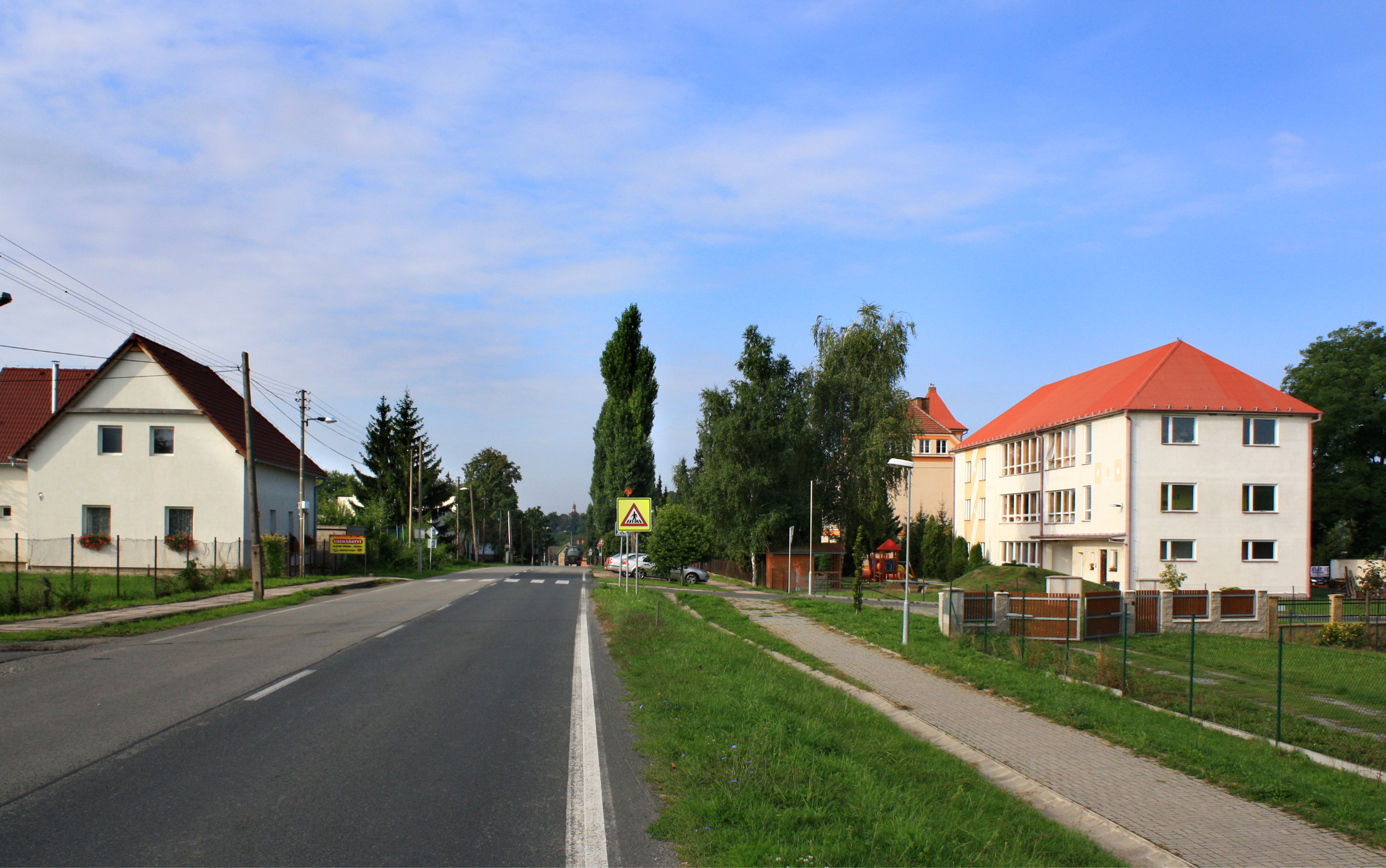
- Main road

- Coat of arms

- Location in the Czech Republic
- Coordinates: 50°31′24″N 14°56′41″E
- Country: Czech Republic
- Region: Central Bohemian
- District: Mladá Boleslav
- First mentioned: 1130

Area
  - Total: 10.99 km^{2} (4.24 sq mi)
- Elevation: 197 m (646 ft)

Population (2026-01-01)
  - Total: 1,137
  - Density: 103.5/km^{2} (268.0/sq mi)
- Time zone: UTC+1 (CET)
  - Summer (DST): UTC+2 (CEST)
- Postal code: 294 73
- Website: www.brodce.cz

Brodce (Czech pronunciation: [ˈbrotsɛ]; German: Brodetz) is a market town in Mladá Boleslav District in the Central Bohemian Region of the Czech Republic. It has about 1,100 inhabitants.

== Etymology ==
The name is a diminutive and plural of the Czech word brod, i.e. 'ford'.

== Geography ==
Brodce is located about 10 kilometres (6 mi) south of Mladá Boleslav and 34 km (21 mi) northeast of Prague. It lies in the Jizera Table. The highest point is at 245 m (804 ft) above sea level. Brodce is situated on the left bank of the Jizera River, which forms the western municipal border.

== History ==
The first written mention of Brodce is in a deed of the Vyšehrad Chapter from 1130. It used to be the centre of a small estate. In the 1570s, during the rule of Albrecht Kaplíř of Sulevice, Brodce was promoted to a market town.

== Demographics ==
Historical population

Year	Pop.	±%
1869	954	—
1880	1,283	+34.5%
1890	1,356	+5.7%
1900	1,287	−5.1%
1910	1,293	+0.5%

Year	Pop.	±%
1921	1,169	−9.6%
1930	1,186	+1.5%
1950	1,088	−8.3%
1961	1,113	+2.3%
1970	1,092	−1.9%

Year	Pop.	±%
1980	1,061	−2.8%
1991	931	−12.3%
2001	990	+6.3%
2011	1,009	+1.9%
2021	1,065	+5.6%

Source: Censuses

== Transport ==
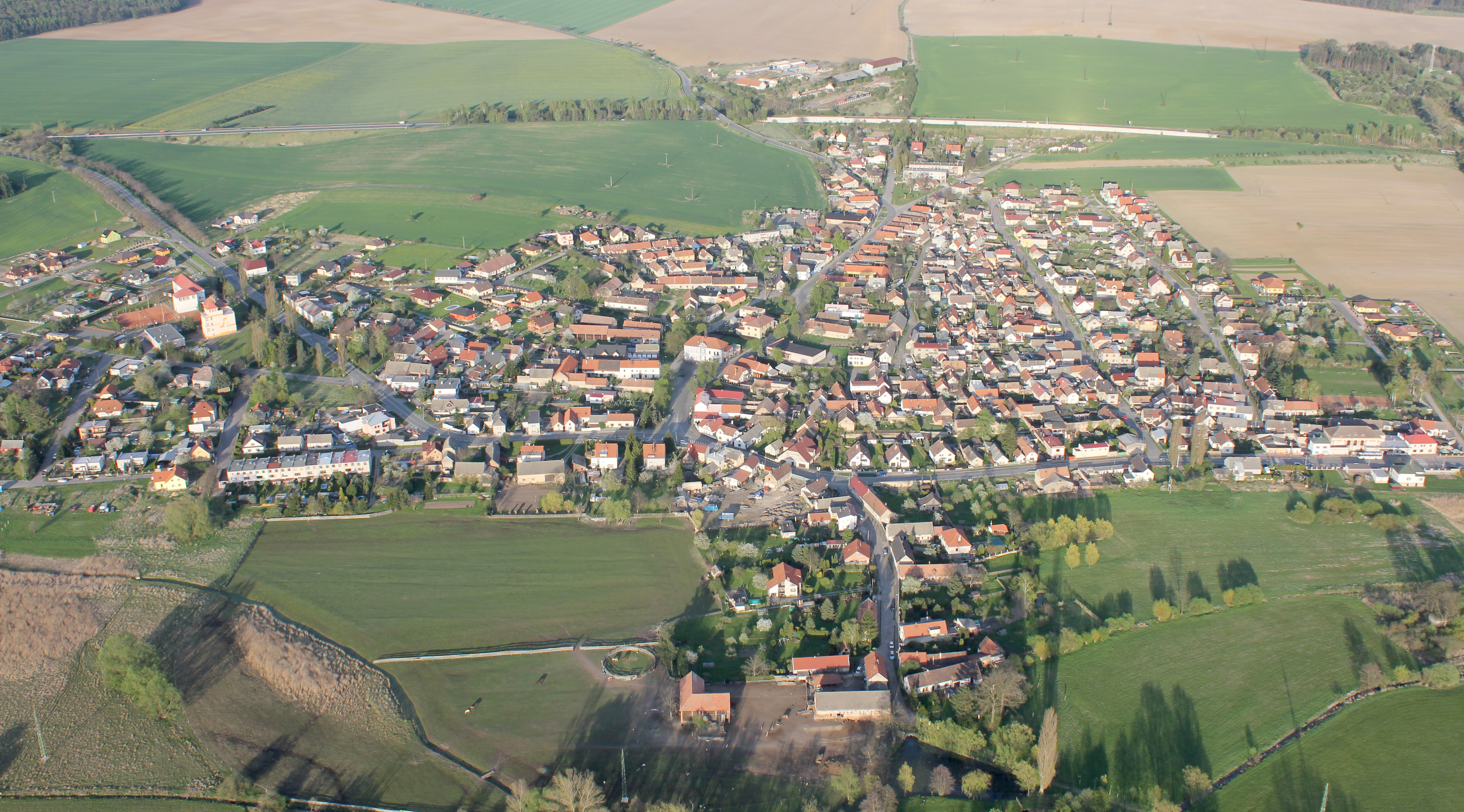
Aerial view

The D10 motorway from Prague to Turnov runs through the municipal territory.

== Sights ==
There are no buildings protected as cultural monuments in the market town. The only monument is the remains of a burial mound from the Bronze Age, where archaeological research was carried out in the 1950s.
