= Kosořice =

- Municipality
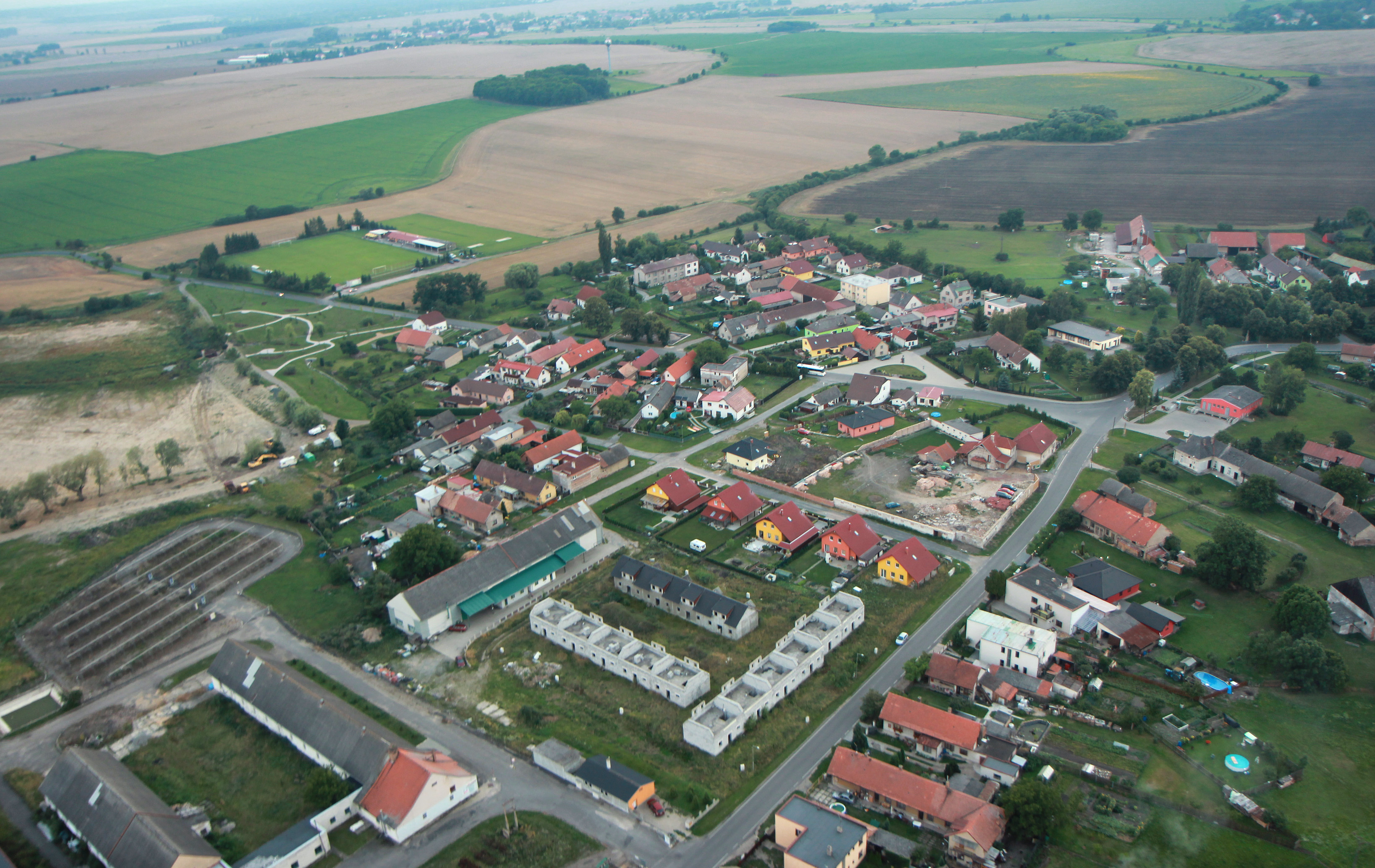
- Aerial view

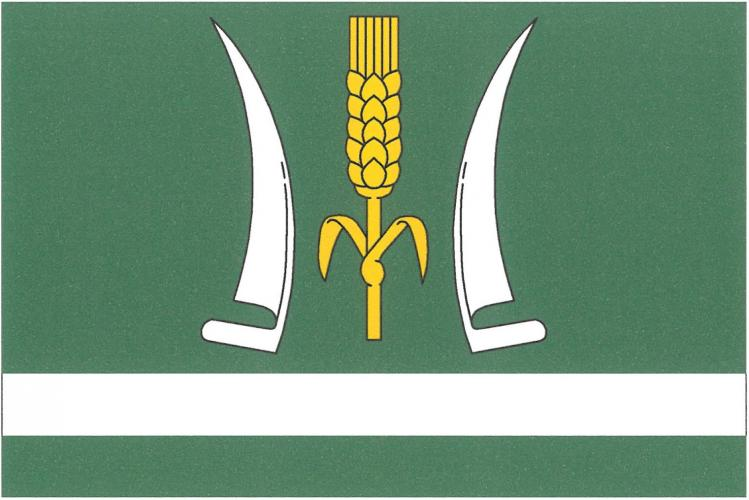
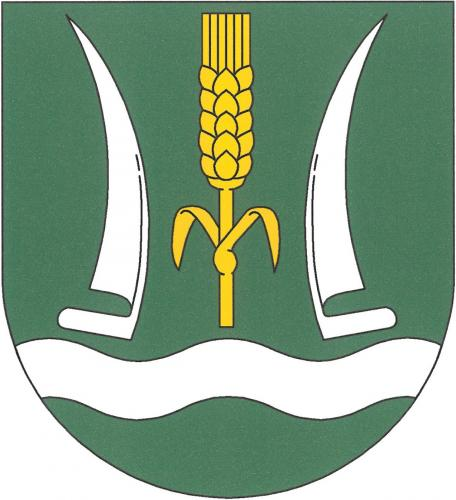
- Flag Coat of arms

- Location in the Czech Republic
- Coordinates: 50°20′0″N 14°58′11″E
- Country: Czech Republic
- Region: Central Bohemian
- District: Mladá Boleslav
- First mentioned: 1347

Area
  - Total: 6.33 km^{2} (2.44 sq mi)
- Elevation: 210 m (690 ft)

Population (2026-01-01)
  - Total: 527
  - Density: 83.3/km^{2} (216/sq mi)
- Time zone: UTC+1 (CET)
  - Summer (DST): UTC+2 (CEST)
- Postal code: 294 41
- Website: www.kosorice.cz

Kosořice is a municipality and village in Mladá Boleslav District in the Central Bohemian Region of the Czech Republic. It has about 500 inhabitants.

== Etymology ==
The name is derived from the surname Kosoř, meaning "the village of Kosoř's people".

== Geography ==
Kosořice is located about 10 kilometres (6 mi) south of Mladá Boleslav and 40 km (25 mi) northeast of Prague. It lies in a flat agricultural landscape in the Jizera Table. The Vlkava Stream flows through the municipality. The river and its nameless tributary supply three fishponds located around the village, called Kosořický rybník, Mrštín and Močický rybník.

== History ==
The first written mention of Kosořice is from 1347.

== Demographics ==
Historical population

Year	Pop.	±%
1869	337	—
1880	433	+28.5%
1890	423	−2.3%
1900	425	+0.5%
1910	501	+17.9%

Year	Pop.	±%
1921	499	−0.4%
1930	493	−1.2%
1950	441	−10.5%
1961	417	−5.4%
1970	369	−11.5%

Year	Pop.	±%
1980	371	+0.5%
1991	358	−3.5%
2001	375	+4.7%
2011	425	+13.3%
2021	497	+16.9%

Source: Censuses

== Transport ==
There are no railways or major roads passing through the municipality.

== Sights ==
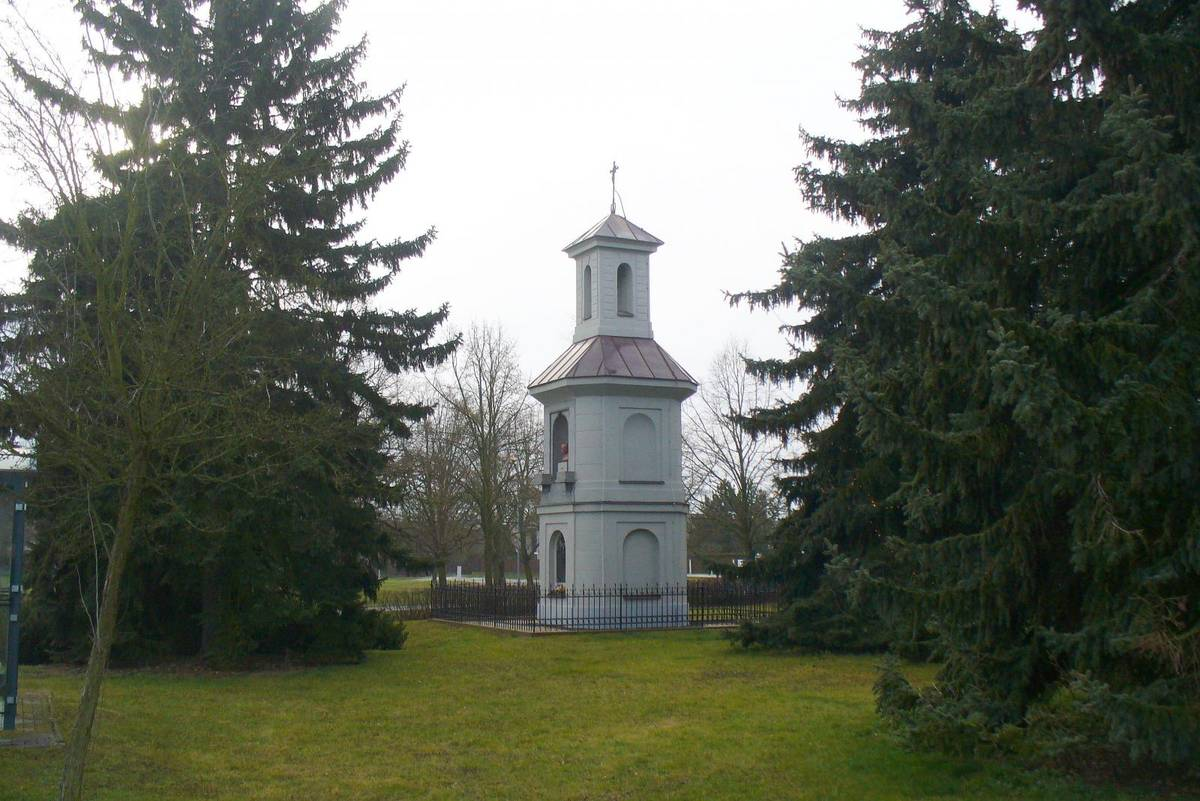
Chapel in the centre of Kosořice

The only protected cultural monument in the municipality is a statue of Saint John of Nepomuk. It was created in the late Baroque style in 1794. The second landmark of the centre of Kosořice is a small chapel with a memorial plaque to the fallen in World War I and a bust of Tomáš Garrigue Masaryk.
