= Rokytá =

- Municipality
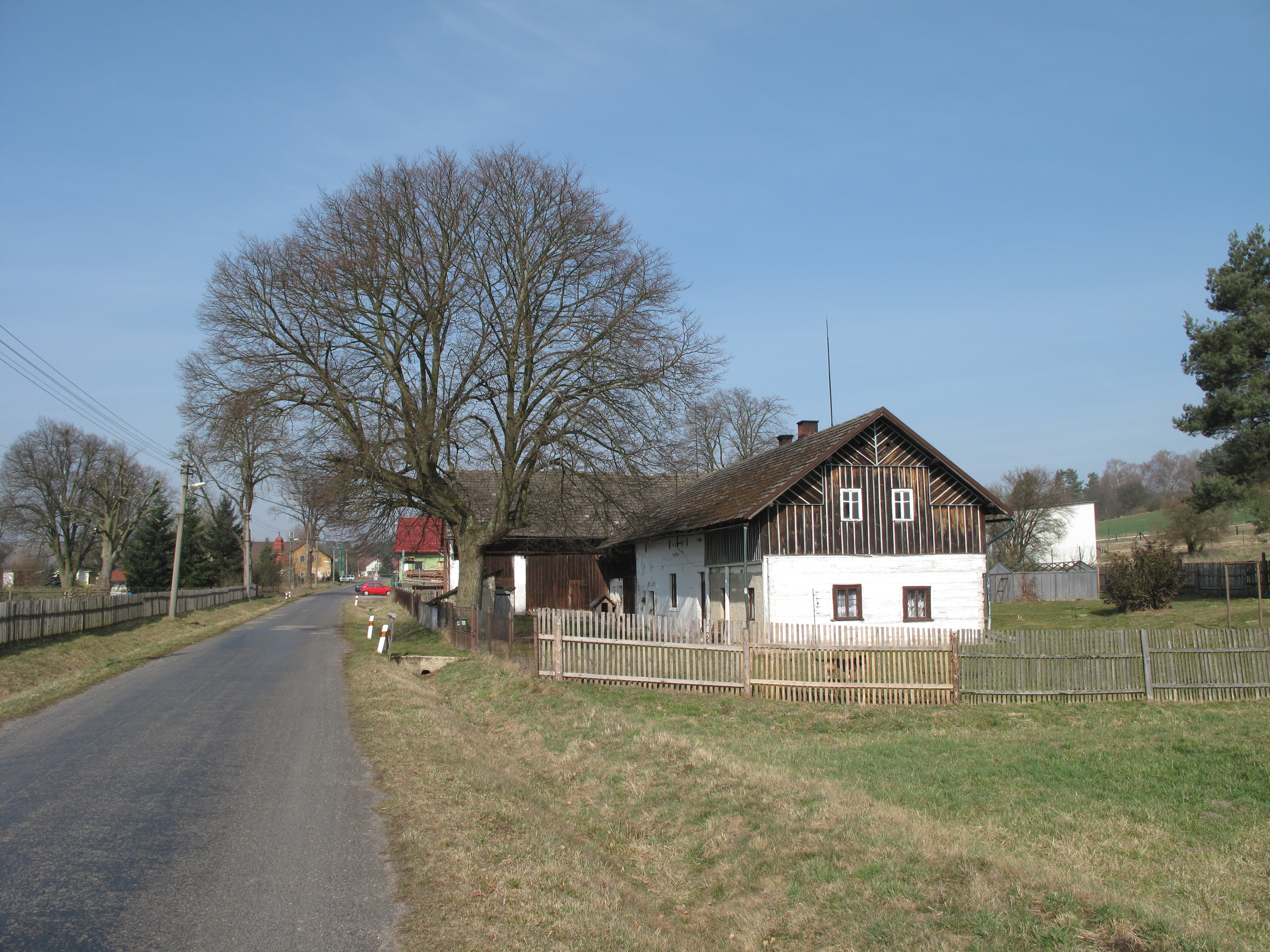
- House by road in Horní Rokytá

- Flag Coat of arms

- Location in the Czech Republic
- Coordinates: 50°33′0″N 14°52′42″E
- Country: Czech Republic
- Region: Central Bohemian
- District: Mladá Boleslav
- First mentioned: 1356

Area
  - Total: 10.60 km^{2} (4.09 sq mi)
- Elevation: 293 m (961 ft)

Population (2026-01-01)
  - Total: 367
  - Density: 34.6/km^{2} (89.7/sq mi)
- Time zone: UTC+1 (CET)
  - Summer (DST): UTC+2 (CEST)
- Postal code: 295 01
- Website: www.obecrokyta.cz

Rokytá is a municipality in Mladá Boleslav District in the Central Bohemian Region of the Czech Republic. It has about 400 inhabitants.

== Administrative division ==
Rokytá consists of two municipal parts (in brackets population according to the 2021 census):

- Dolní Rokytá (193)
- Horní Rokytá (143)

== Demographics ==
Historical population
| Year | Pop. | ±% |
|---|---|---|
| 1869 | 790 | — |
| 1880 | 744 | −5.8% |
| 1890 | 705 | −5.2% |
| 1900 | 718 | +1.8% |
| 1910 | 745 | +3.8% |
| 1921 | 726 | −2.6% |
| 1930 | 753 | +3.7% |
| 1950 | 437 | −42.0% |
| 1961 | 384 | −12.1% |
| 1970 | 258 | −32.8% |
| 1980 | 235 | −8.9% |
| 1991 | 182 | −22.6% |
| 2001 | 192 | +5.5% |
| 2011 | 230 | +19.8% |
| 2021 | 336 | +46.1% |
Source: Censuses
