= Mladějov =

- Municipality
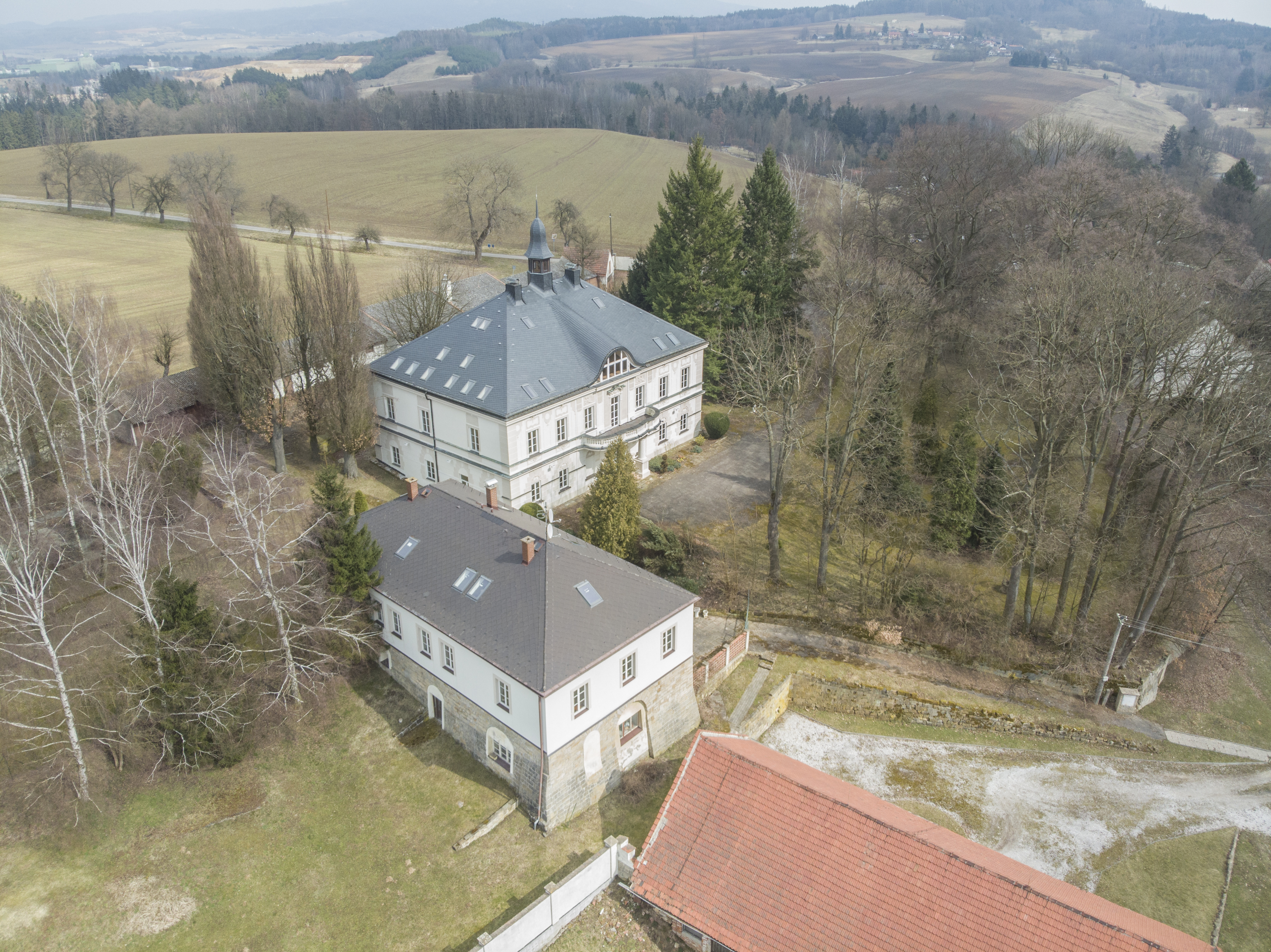
- Mladějov Castle

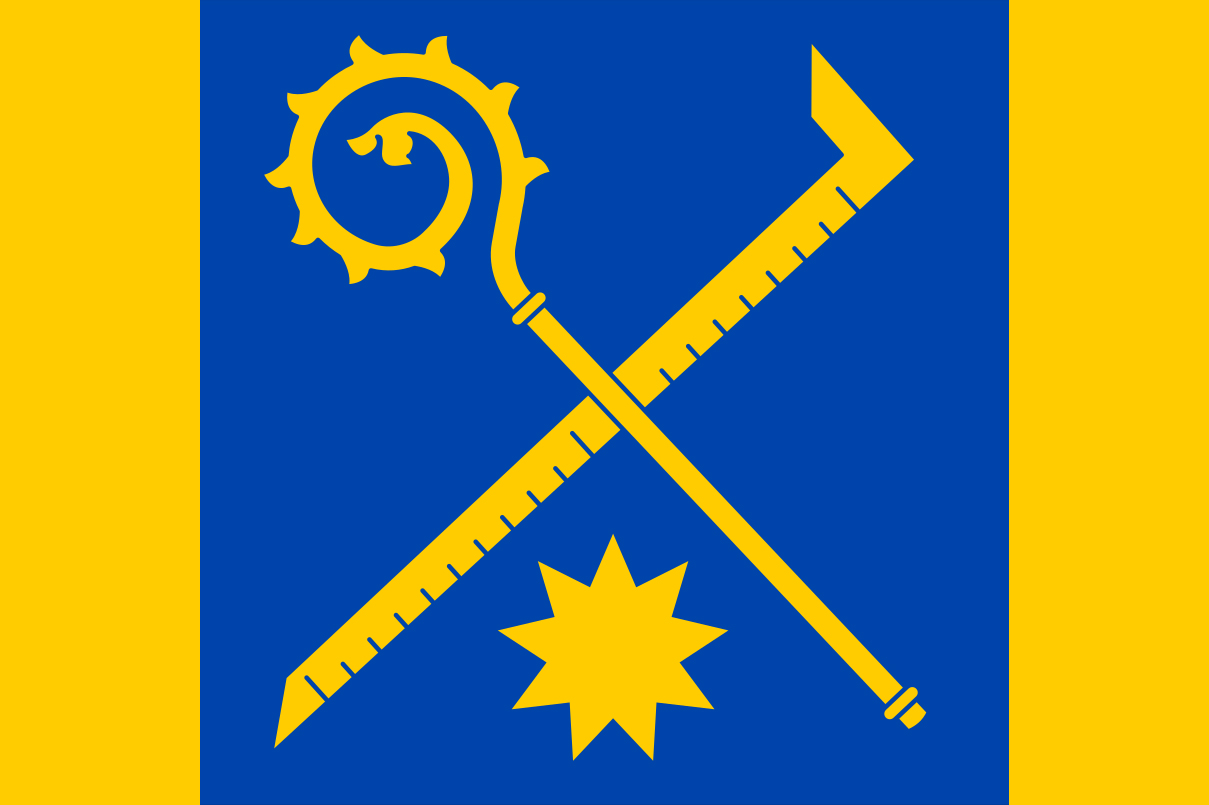
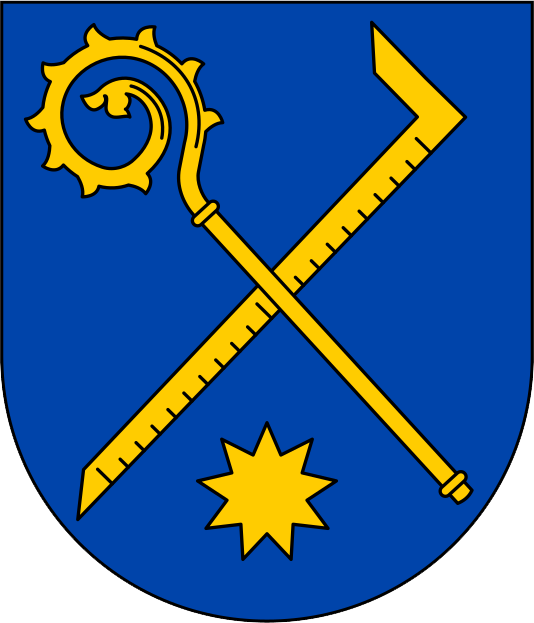
- Flag Coat of arms

- Location in the Czech Republic
- Coordinates: 50°28′56″N 15°13′58″E
- Country: Czech Republic
- Region: Hradec Králové
- District: Jičín
- First mentioned: 1352

Area
  - Total: 12.05 km^{2} (4.65 sq mi)
- Elevation: 285 m (935 ft)

Population (2026-01-01)
  - Total: 550
  - Density: 46/km^{2} (120/sq mi)
- Time zone: UTC+1 (CET)
  - Summer (DST): UTC+2 (CEST)
- Postal codes: 506 01, 507 45
- Website: obecmladejov.cz

Mladějov is a municipality and village in Jičín District in the Hradec Králové Region of the Czech Republic. It has about 600 inhabitants.

== Administrative division ==
Mladějov consists of eight municipal parts (in brackets population according to the 2021 census):

- Mladějov (239)
- Bacov (16)
- Hubojedy (52)
- Kozlov (15)
- Loveč (32)
- Pařízek (19)
- Roveň (82)
- Střeleč (38)

== Demographics ==
Historical population
Year	Pop.	±%
1869	1,214	—
1880	1,261	+3.9%
1890	1,169	−7.3%
1900	1,148	−1.8%
1910	1,219	+6.2%
1921	1,176	−3.5%
1930	1,096	−6.8%
1950	871	−20.5%
1961	851	−2.3%
1970	801	−5.9%
1980	676	−15.6%
1991	575	−14.9%
2001	525	−8.7%
2011	476	−9.3%
2021	493	+3.6%
Source: Censuses
