= Obruby =

- Municipality
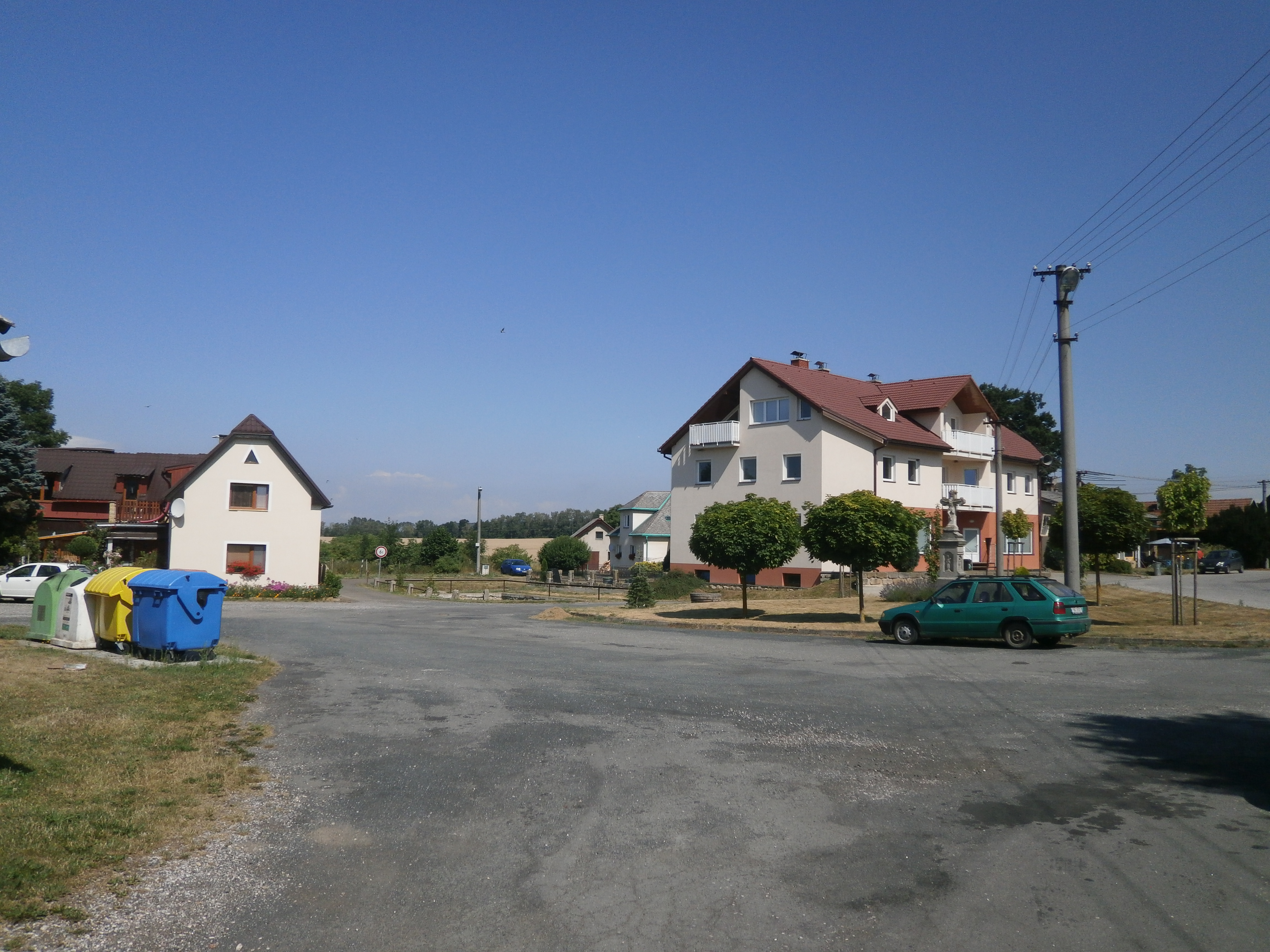
- Centre of Obruby

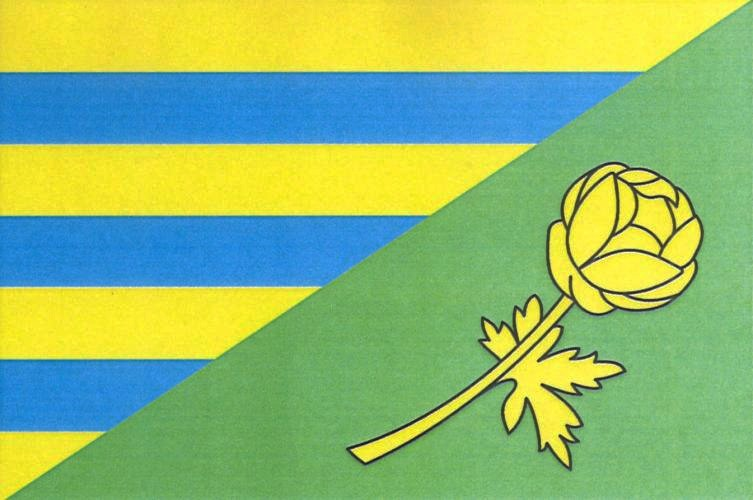
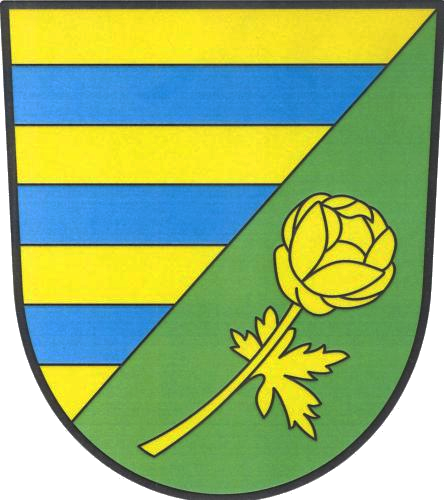
- Flag Coat of arms

- Location in the Czech Republic
- Coordinates: 50°27′37″N 15°4′57″E
- Country: Czech Republic
- Region: Central Bohemian
- District: Mladá Boleslav
- First mentioned: 1408

Area
  - Total: 4.48 km^{2} (1.73 sq mi)
- Elevation: 255 m (837 ft)

Population (2026-01-01)
  - Total: 256
  - Density: 57.1/km^{2} (148/sq mi)
- Time zone: UTC+1 (CET)
  - Summer (DST): UTC+2 (CEST)
- Postal code: 294 03
- Website: www.obec-obruby.cz

Obruby is a municipality and village in Mladá Boleslav District in the Central Bohemian Region of the Czech Republic. It has about 300 inhabitants.

== Etymology ==
The name was derived from the old Czech word obrub, which can be translated as 'border', 'edge' or 'wall'.

== Geography ==
Obruby is located about 13 kilometres (8 mi) east of Mladá Boleslav and 56 km (35 mi) northeast of Prague. It lies in the Jičín Uplands. The highest point is at 320 m (1,050 ft) above sea level. The stream Přepeřský potok flows through the municipality.

== History ==
The first written mention of Obruby is from 1408.

== Demographics ==
Historical population

Year	Pop.	±%
1869	394	—
1880	401	+1.8%
1890	402	+0.2%
1900	394	−2.0%
1910	379	−3.8%

Year	Pop.	±%
1921	369	−2.6%
1930	396	+7.3%
1950	317	−19.9%
1961	309	−2.5%
1970	256	−17.2%

Year	Pop.	±%
1980	232	−9.4%
1991	214	−7.8%
2001	201	−6.1%
2011	226	+12.4%
2021	248	+9.7%

Source: Censuses

== Transport ==
The I/16 road (the section from Mladá Boleslav to Jičín) runs through the municipality.

== Sights ==
The only protected cultural monument in the municipality is a rural homestead from the end of the 18th century.
