= Přepeře (Mladá Boleslav District) =

- Municipality
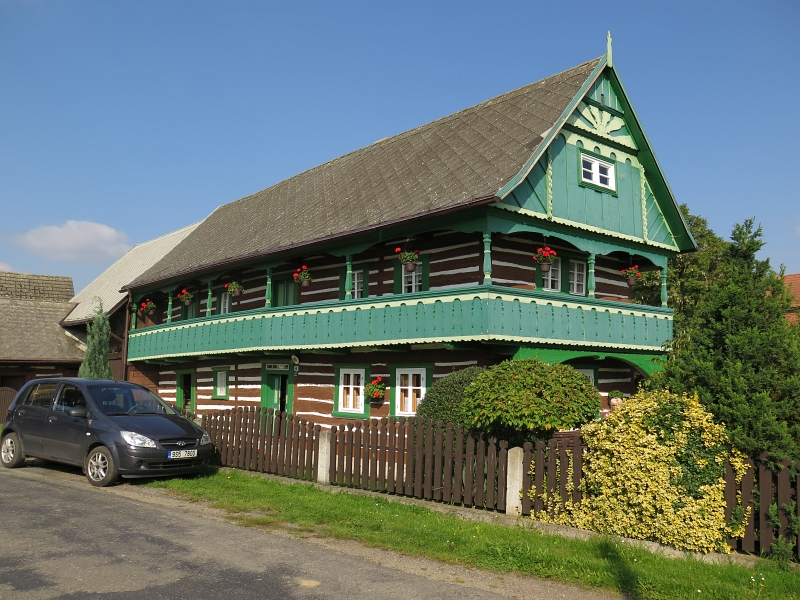
- Timber-framed house in Přepeře

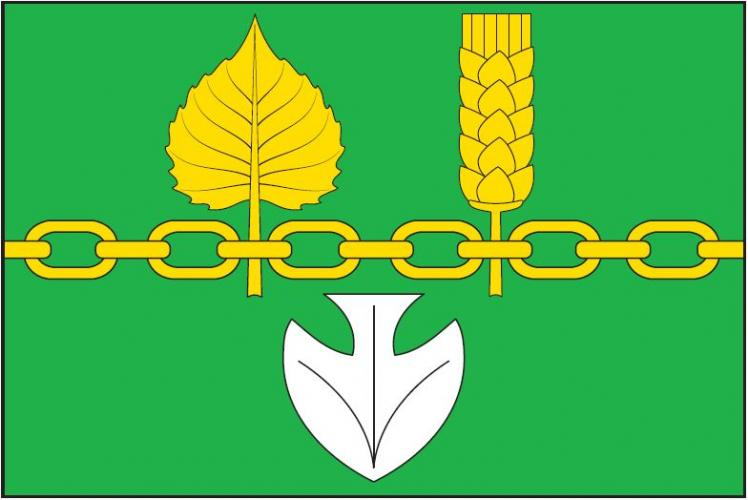
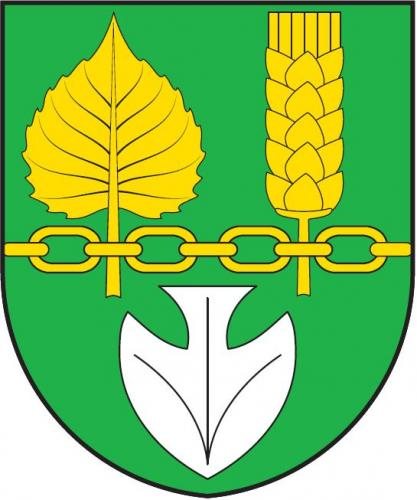
- Flag Coat of arms

- Location in the Czech Republic
- Coordinates: 50°28′4″N 15°6′7″E
- Country: Czech Republic
- Region: Central Bohemian
- District: Mladá Boleslav
- First mentioned: 1457

Area
  - Total: 3.19 km^{2} (1.23 sq mi)
- Elevation: 282 m (925 ft)

Population (2026-01-01)
  - Total: 119
  - Density: 37.3/km^{2} (96.6/sq mi)
- Time zone: UTC+1 (CET)
  - Summer (DST): UTC+2 (CEST)
- Postal code: 294 04
- Website: www.obec-prepere.cz

Přepeře is a municipality and village in Mladá Boleslav District in the Central Bohemian Region of the Czech Republic. It has about 100 inhabitants.

== Demographics ==
Historical population
Year	Pop.	±%
1869	365	—
1880	385	+5.5%
1890	383	−0.5%
1900	354	−7.6%
1910	358	+1.1%
1921	334	−6.7%
1930	289	−13.5%
1950	197	−31.8%
1961	199	+1.0%
1970	191	−4.0%
1980	176	−7.9%
1991	145	−17.6%
2001	116	−20.0%
2011	144	+24.1%
2021	111	−22.9%
Source: Censuses
