= Košátecký potok =

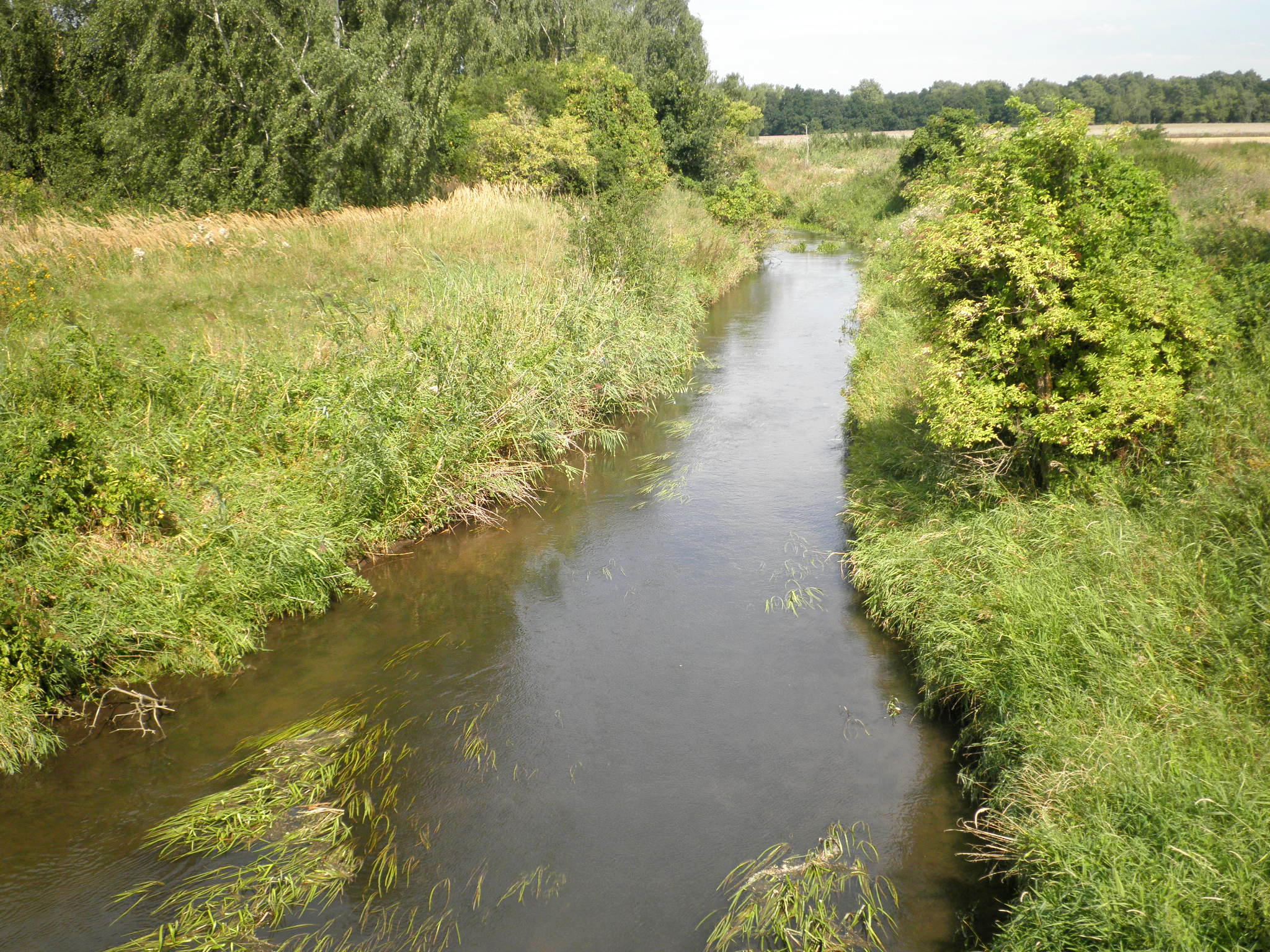
- The Košátecký potok near estuary

Location
- Country: Czech Republic
- Region: Central Bohemian

Physical characteristics
- Source
  - location: Mšeno, Jizera Table
  - coordinates: 50°26′31″N 14°37′59″E
  - elevation: 333 m (1,093 ft)
- Mouth
  - location: Elbe
  - coordinates: 50°16′17″N 14°31′35″E
  - elevation: 160 m (520 ft)
- Length: 43.0 km (26.7 mi)
- Basin size: 218.3 km^{2} (84.3 sq mi)
- Discharge
  - average: 0.70 m^{3}/s (25 cu ft/s) near estuary

Basin features
- Progression: Elbe→ North Sea

The Košátecký potok is a stream in the Czech Republic, a right tributary of the Elbe River. It flows through the Central Bohemian Region. It is 43.0 km (26.7 mi) long, but the upper course of the stream is dry for most of the year.

== Etymology ==
The name means 'Košátky stream' in Czech.

== Characteristic ==
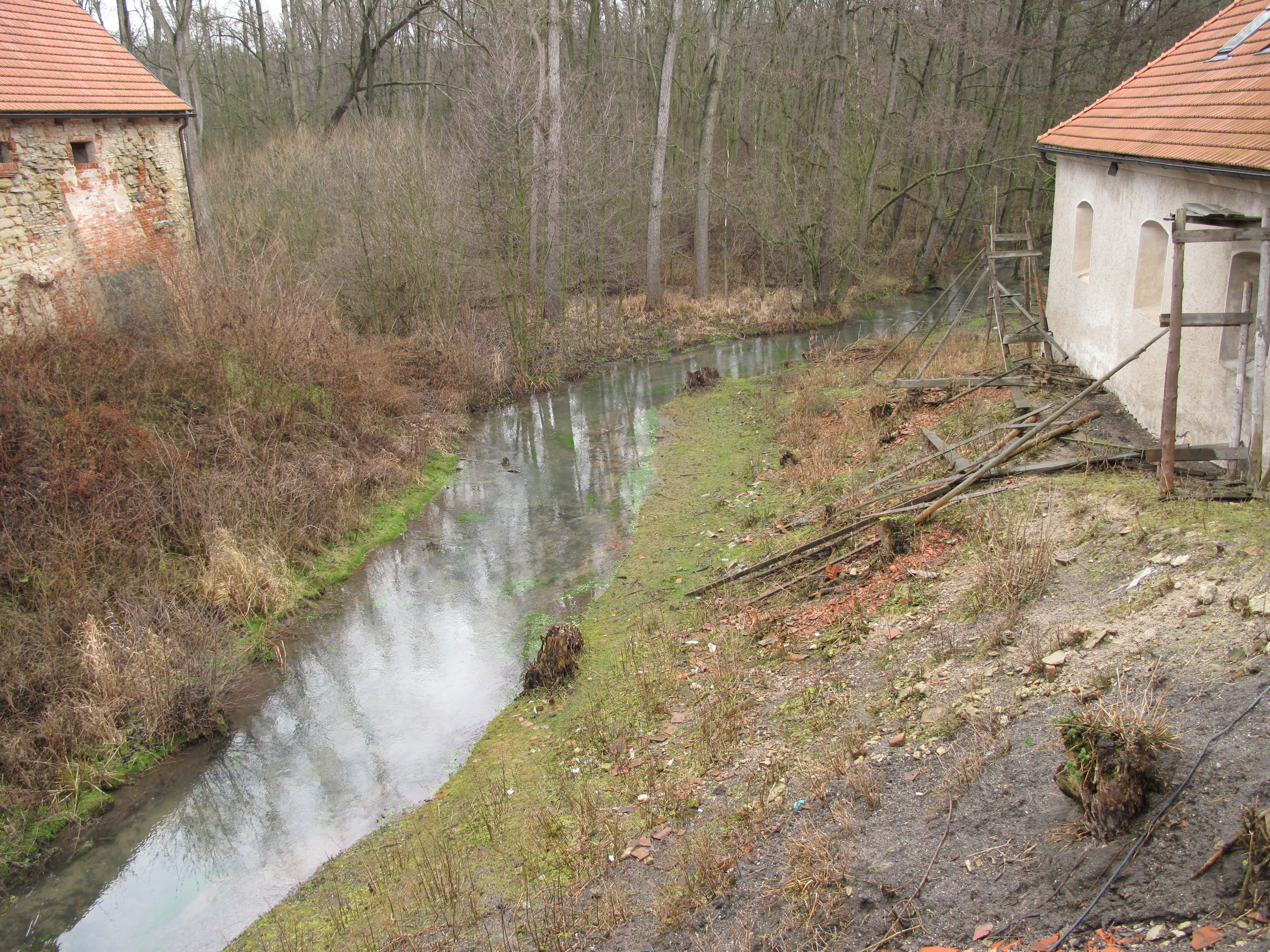
The Košátecký potok in Košátky

The Košátecký potok originates in the territory of Mšeno in the Jizera Table at an elevation of 333 m (1,093 ft) and flows to Neratovice, where it enters the Elbe River at an elevation of 160 m (520 ft). It is 43.0 km (26.7 mi) long. Its drainage basin has an area of 218.3 km^{2} (84.3 sq mi). The average discharge at its mouth is 0.70 m^{3}/s (25 cu ft/s), however, the average discharge at 13.9 river km in Košátky is only 0.30 m^{3}/s (11 cu ft/s). The upper course of the stream up to Chotětov dry up and there is usually water in it only during the spring.

The longest tributaries of the Košátecký potok are:

| Tributary | Length (km) | Side |
|---|---|---|
| Tišický potok | 6.3 | left |
| Jelenický potok | 5.3 | right |

== Course ==
The stream flows through the municipal territories of Mšeno, Vrátno, Boreč, Stránka, Velké Všelisy, Sovínky, Nemyslovice, Chotětov, Kropáčova Vrutice, Košátky, Byšice, Liblice, Čečelice, Všetaty, Tišice and Neratovice.

== Bodies of water ==
There are 97 bodies of water in the basin area, but none of them is notable. The fishpond Jezero is built in the area of the stream's spring.

== See also ==
- List of rivers of the Czech Republic
