= Boreč =

- Municipality
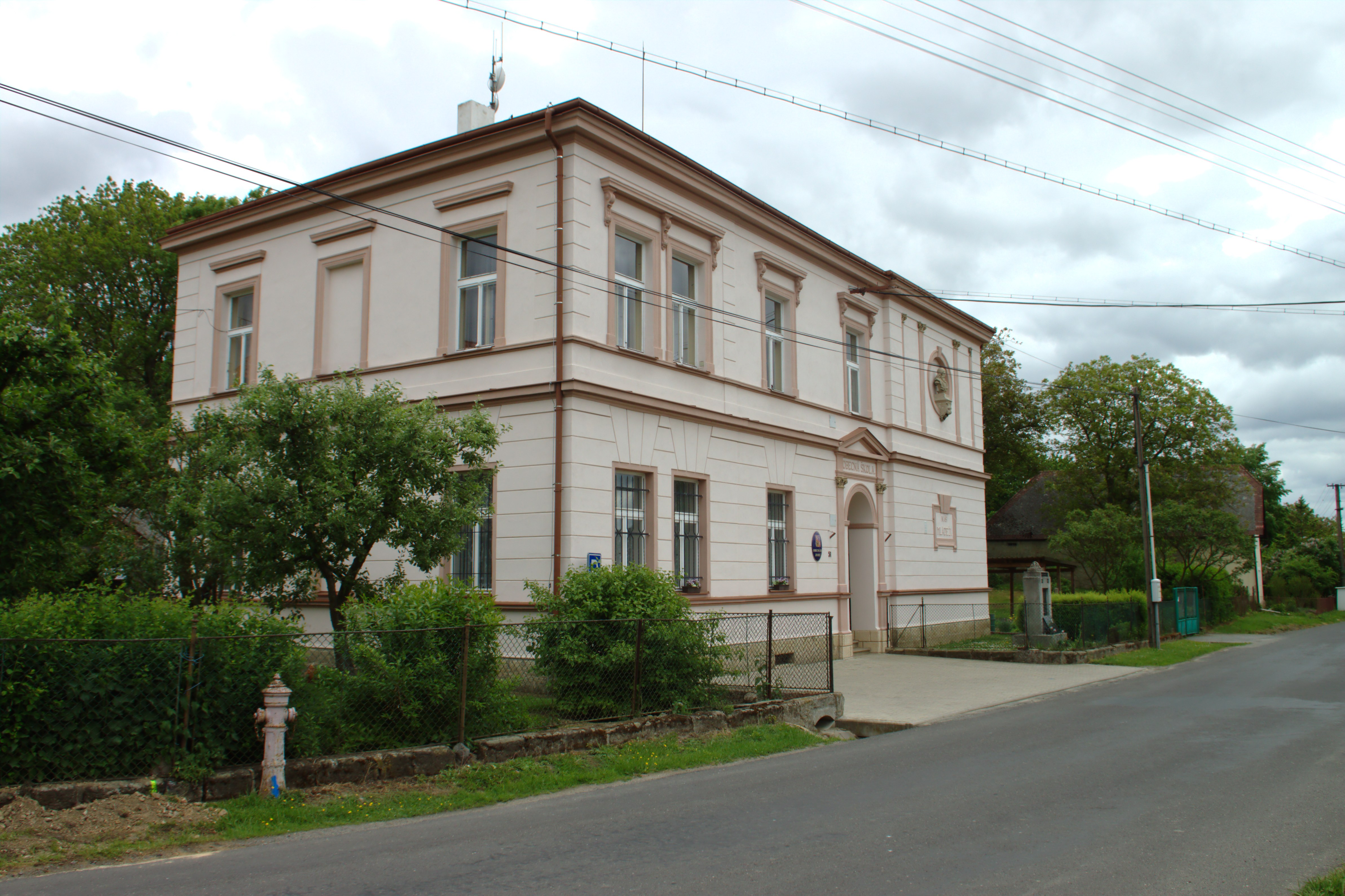
- Municipal office

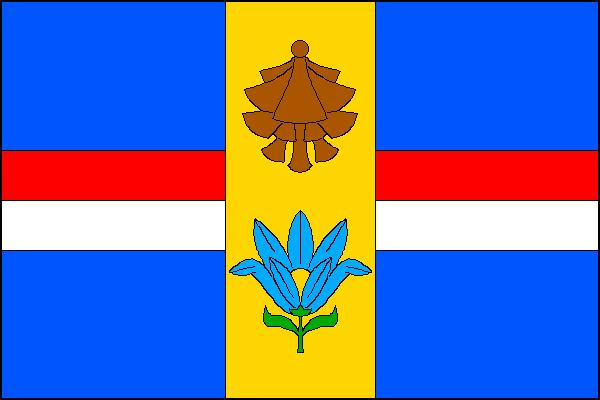
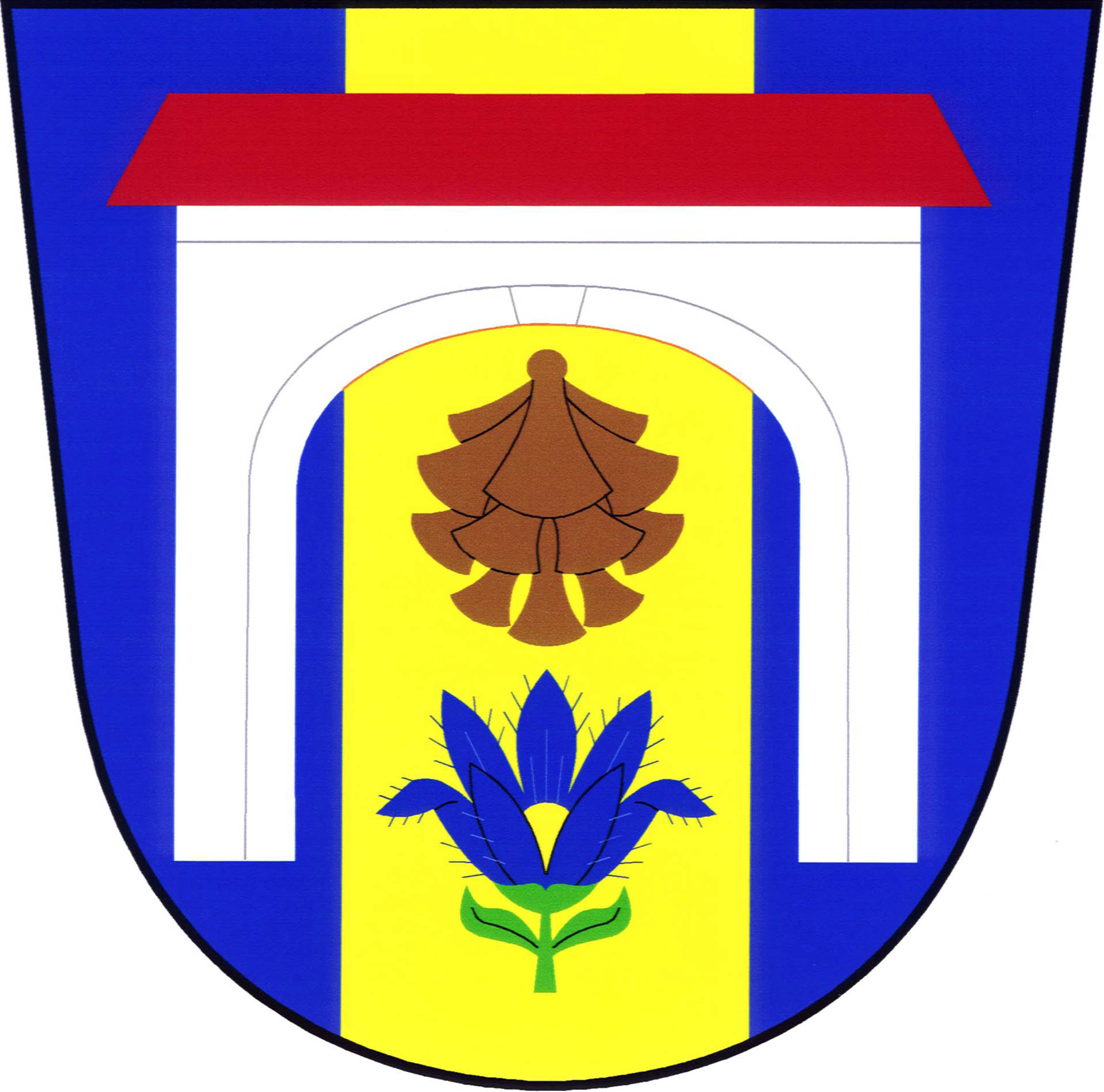
- Flag Coat of arms

- Location in the Czech Republic
- Coordinates: 50°24′27″N 14°43′57″E
- Country: Czech Republic
- Region: Central Bohemian
- District: Mladá Boleslav
- First mentioned: 1385

Area
  - Total: 6.94 km^{2} (2.68 sq mi)
- Elevation: 294 m (965 ft)

Population (2026-01-01)
  - Total: 281
  - Density: 40.5/km^{2} (105/sq mi)
- Time zone: UTC+1 (CET)
  - Summer (DST): UTC+2 (CEST)
- Postal code: 294 26
- Website: www.obec-borec.cz

Boreč is a municipality and village in Mladá Boleslav District in the Central Bohemian Region of the Czech Republic. It has about 300 inhabitants.

== Administrative division ==
Boreč consists of two municipal parts (in brackets population according to the 2021 census):

- Boreč (130)
- Žebice (134)

== Etymology ==
The initial name of the village was Bořeč. The name was derived from the personal name Bořek, meaning "Bořek's (court)".

== Geography ==
Boreč is located about 13 kilometres (8 mi) west of Mladá Boleslav and 37 km (23 mi) northeast of Prague. It lies in an agricultural landscape in the Jizera Table. The stream Košátecký potok flows along the western and southern municipal border.

== History ==
The first written mention of Boreč is from 1385. Around 1404, the village belonged to Lords of Kováň. In 1505, Boreč was documented as a part of the Košátky estate, which was bought by King Ferdinand I in 1548. In 1615–1694, the entire village belonged to the Bezno estate, then part of the village was annexed to the Velké Všelisy estate. This lasted until the establishment of a sovereign municipality in 1848.

== Demographics ==
Historical population

Year	Pop.	±%
1869	349	—
1880	325	−6.9%
1890	350	+7.7%
1900	394	+12.6%
1910	436	+10.7%

Year	Pop.	±%
1921	325	−25.5%
1930	382	+17.5%
1950	233	−39.0%
1961	396	+70.0%
1970	326	−17.7%

Year	Pop.	±%
1980	268	−17.8%
1991	226	−15.7%
2001	291	+28.8%
2011	279	−4.1%
2021	264	−5.4%

Source: Censuses

== Transport ==
There are no railways or major roads passing through the municipality.

== Sights ==
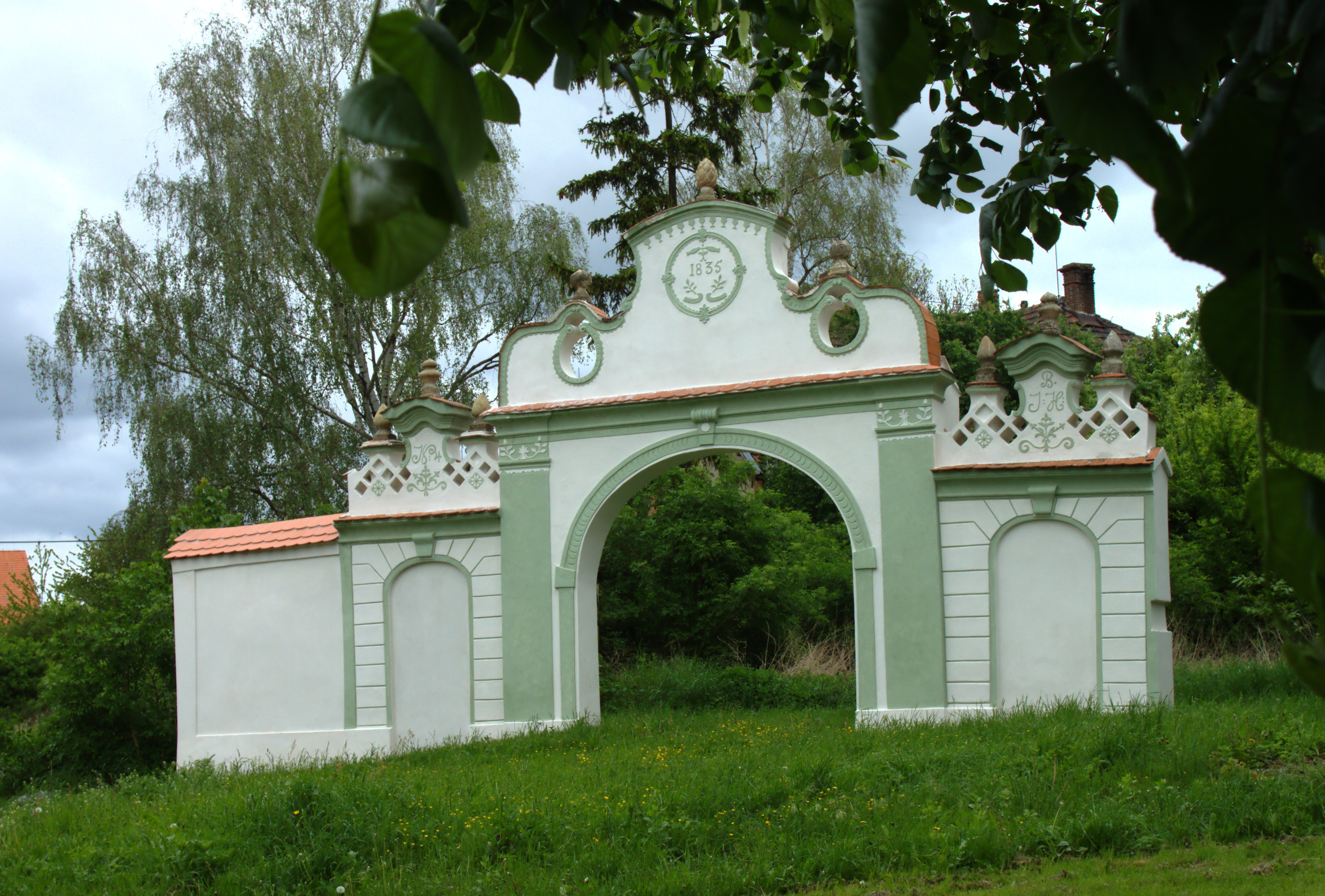
Gate of a former homestead

Boreč is poor in monuments. Among the protected cultural monuments are a late Baroque gate from 1835 and a rural homestead from the 1840s.
