= Mary Louisa Kirschner =

German-Czech artist (1852-1931)

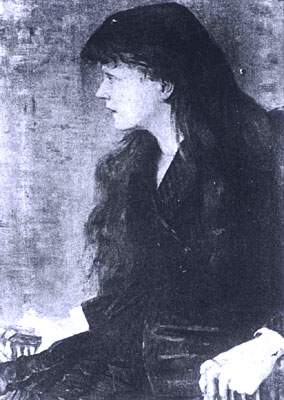
- Self-portrait, 1880
- Born: 7 January 1852; Prague, Austrian Empire
- Died: 30 June 1931 (aged 79); Košátky, Czechoslovakia
- Known for: Painting, Art Glass
- Movement: Jugendstil

Mary Louisa Kirschner (7 January 1852 – 30 June 1931) was a painter and glass artist.

== Biography ==
Kirschner was born in Prague and first trained in Vienna with Anton Hansch and later with Adolf Heinrich Lier, under whom she showed her first works in Munich in 1871. In 1873 she began making copies after Jules Dupré and that winter her family moved to Paris, where she met him in person. When he saw her copies, he said "Jamais je n'ai été copié comme cela. J'aurais pu m'y trompera moi-même." She was accepted as his only pupil. She returned to her family's home in the Czech countryside where she painted Polish oxen that were favorably received in London in the Aquarium, Westminster in 1876.

From 1887 Marie Kirschner lived with her younger sister Aloisia Kirschner in Berlin, but spent the summers in Bohemia. She was a member of the Berlin Lyceum Club. In Prague, she also belonged to the American Progressive League. Her acquaintances included Zdenka Braunerová.

In later life she became a glass artist, working mostly in the Jugendstil style.

Kirschner remained unmarried like her sister Aloisia. She died in Košátky. She was buried in the family grave at Malvazinky cemetery in Prague.

== See also ==
- List of German women artists
