= Viktor Oliva =

Czech painter and illustrator (1861–1928)

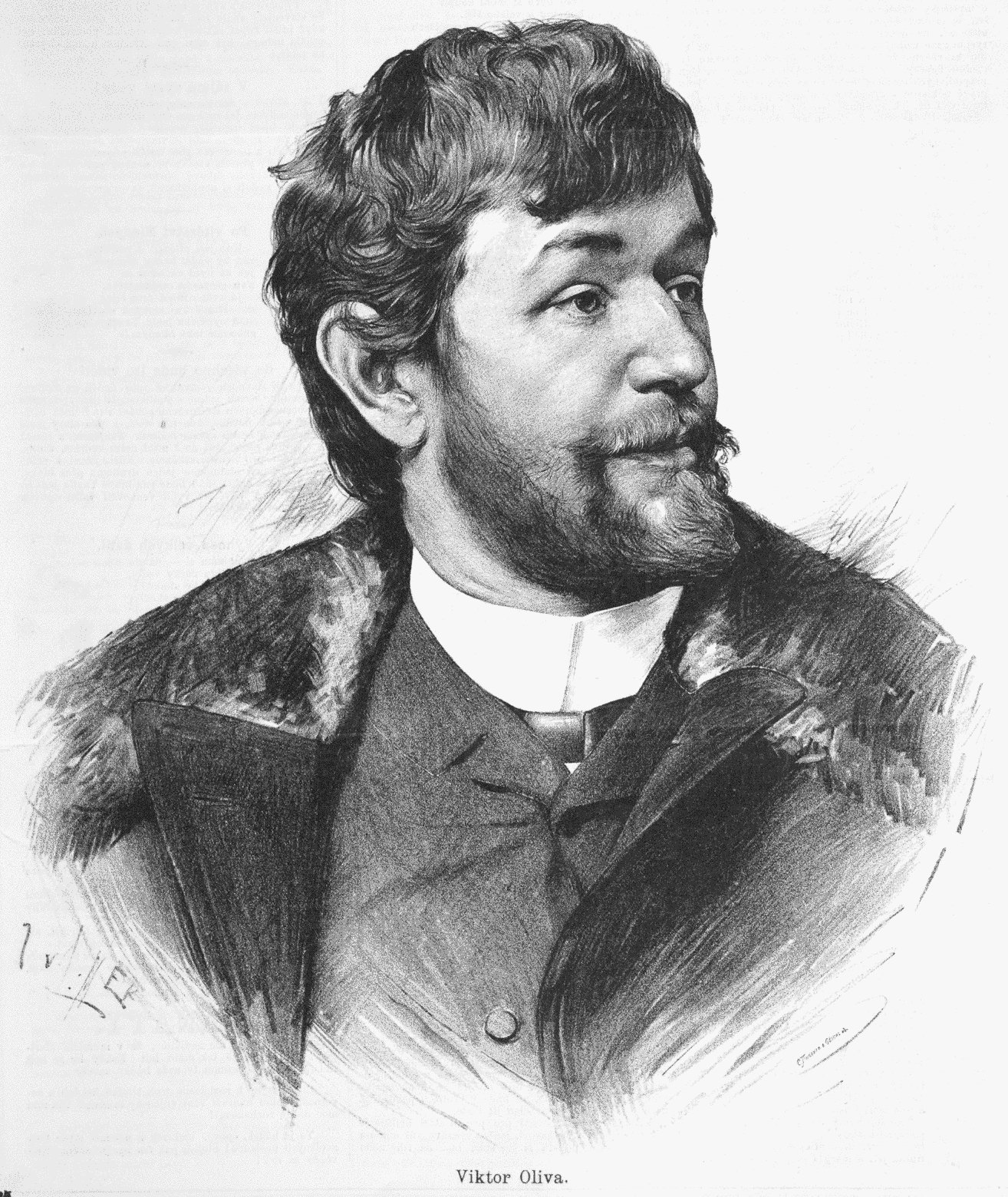
Viktor Oliva (1889)

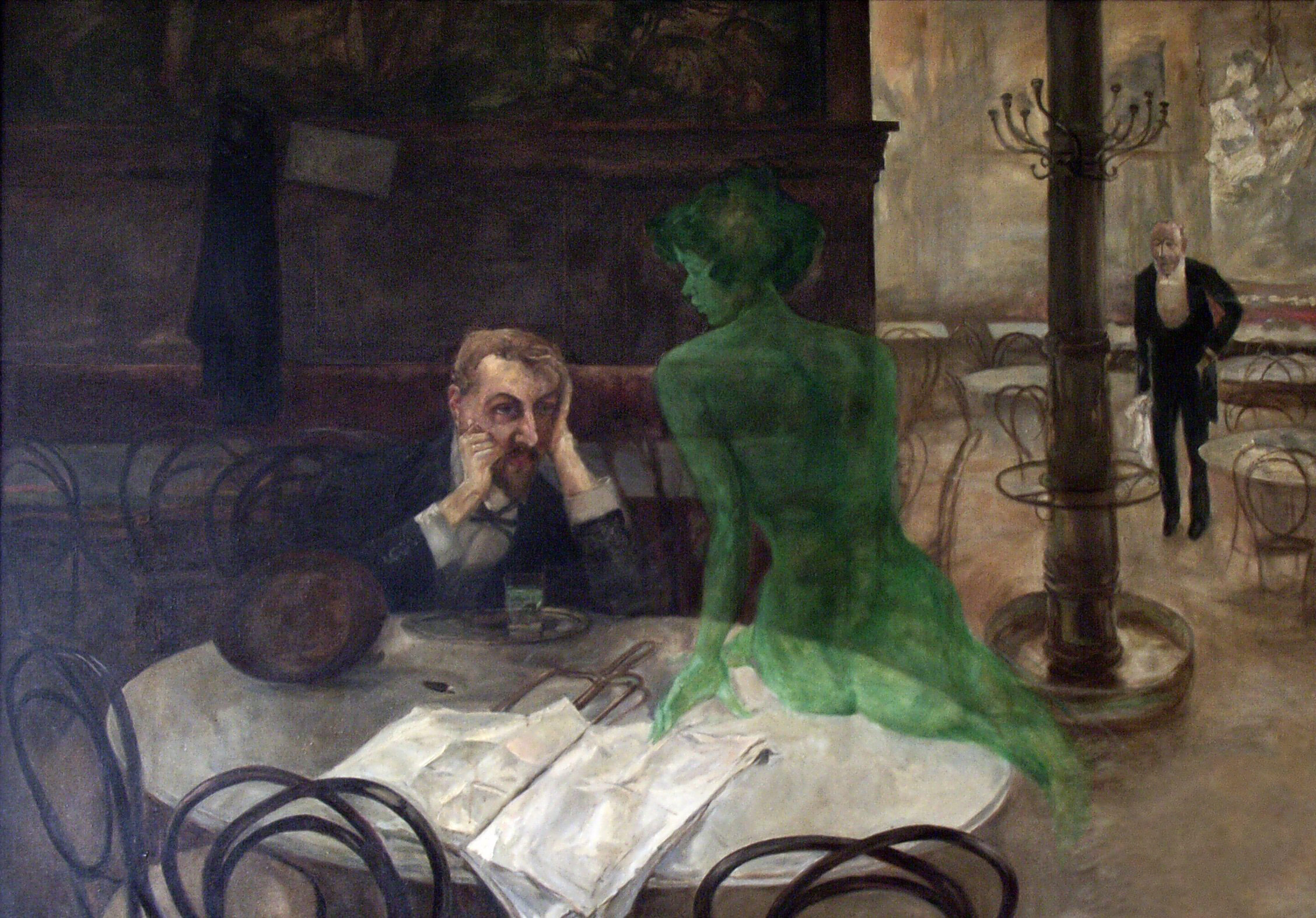
The Absinthe Drinker by Viktor Oliva

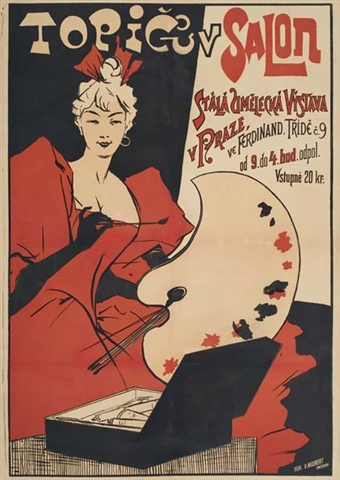
Viktor Oliva, Topičův Salon, Poster, 1895

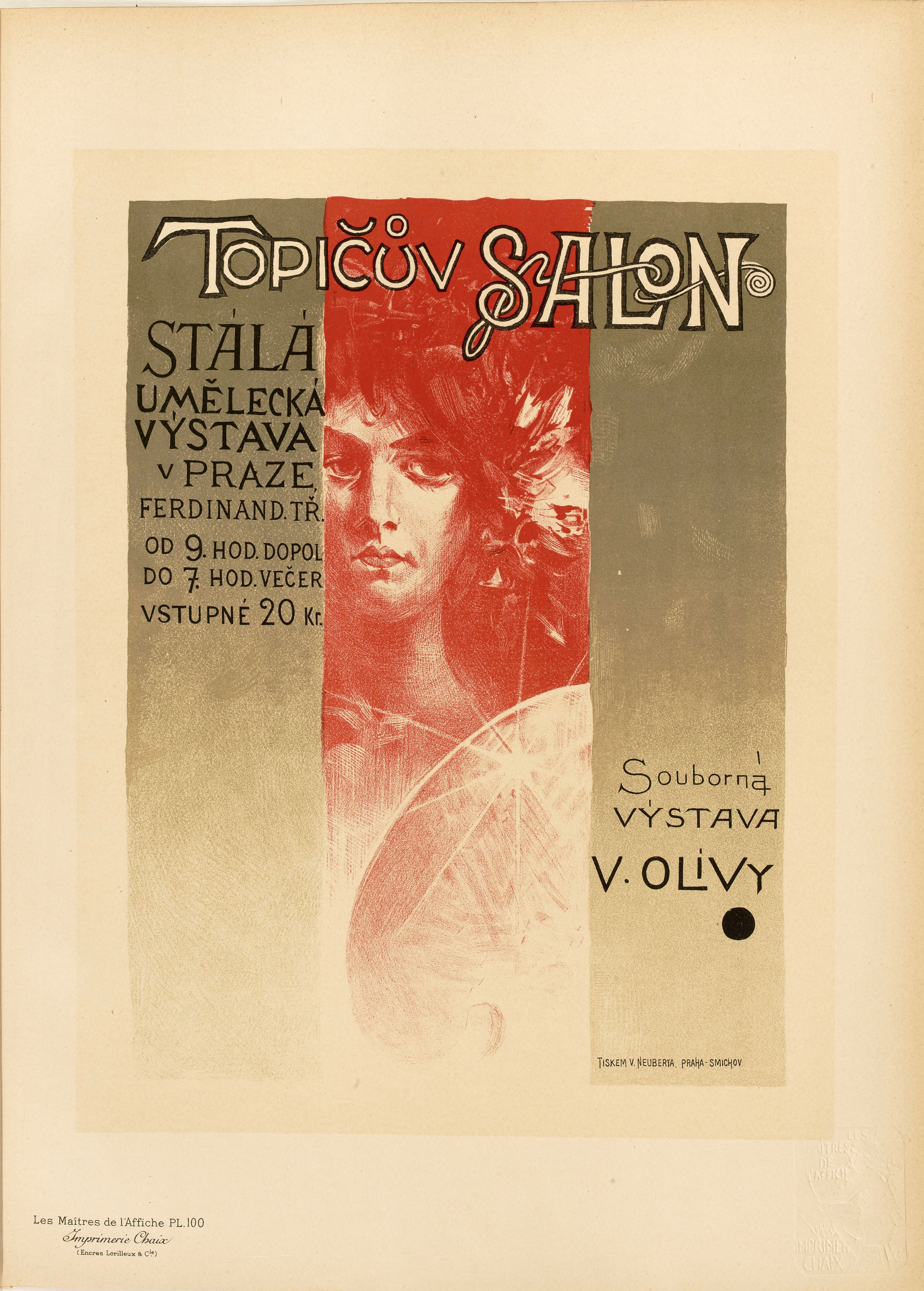
Poster 100 in Les Maîtres de l'Affiche

Viktor Oliva (24 April 1861 – 5 April 1928) was a Czech painter and illustrator.

His most famous painting, Absinthe Drinker (Czech: Piják absintu), is owned by Zlata Husa Gallery Prague and hangs there.

== Life and work ==
Viktor Oliva was an artist focused in drawing, illustration, and painting born in Nové Strašecí, Bohemia, Austria-Hungary on 24 April 1861. His main style was Art Nouveau. At the age of 17, he attended the Academy of Fine Arts, Prague and studied under František Sequens, who greatly respected his work. He continued his studies at the Munich Academy.

In 1888, he was drawn to the Montmartre area of Paris to be part of the ever rapidly expanding artistic community there. He lived there for some years and became good friends with other "Bohemian Parisiens" such as Luděk Marold, Mikoláš Aleš, Jakub Arbes, and Karel Vítězslav Mašek. This group of actual Bohemians (from Bohemia) were right in the heart of the "Bohemian Revolution".

His art greatly improved in such a richly artistic environment. Paris is where he discovered the joy of absinthe. He also greatly loved the exhilaration of ballooning. This group all held very true to the ideals that the Artistic Bohemians believed in. They all lived and worked there for several years before returning to their home in true Bohemia.

In 1897, he was given the job of Images Editor at the popular Czech language magazine Zlatá Praha (Golden Prague). He held this job for 19 years. Shortly after he started work there, he married opera singer Anna Adamcová, who was enamoured with his talent. She was a former lover of the director of the National Theatre František Šubert, who wanted to provide for his mistress out of gratitude and helped arrange her marriage. Not long after that, she gave birth to his son Viktor Oliva Jr. (who also was an aspiring artist). The marriage didn't last long, as Anna ran away with a singer named Mařák. Oliva was still able to spend some time with his son, which brought him much joy.

Over the next quarter century, Oliva was very prolific in his work. He spent a lot of time with his worldly best friend Josef Kořenský (a true world traveller at a time when this was difficult). Oliva was commissioned to create many dramatic works, including the ceilings of several buildings in Bohemia. He also had several works hanging in his favourite cafe, Café Slavia (which still has his most famous work Piják absintu (Absinthe Drinker) hanging inside).

He died on 5 April 1928 in Prague and was buried in Olšany Cemetery in an area for famous artists.

== Opinions from the art world of the early 21st century ==
According to an annotation from what is most likely the Troja Castle gallery in Prague:

"The youngest artist at Troja is Viktor Oliva. He was primarily a graphic artist. His dust covers, book bindings and posters are among the best examples of Czech applied graphic art of the 1890s. In addition, however, he painted several ceilings and decorations for a number of Prague cafes. The entire work bespeaks the influence of French fin de siecle art, which is also a characteristic of Oliva's portraits."

According to the catalogue of Czech art auction house Meissner-Neumann:

"Czech painter and illustrator, he studied under F. Sequens at the Academy of Art in Prague, then in Munich and Paris. He was influenced by the work of his friend L. Marold. He created chiefly portraits and large-scale paintings following the historicizing stream in art. His portraits and large number of illustrations for books by Czech and European authors, as well as his poster designs, testify to the contemporary lifestyle based on the Art Nouveau style."

== Notable friends ==
- Mikoláš Aleš, artist
- Jakub Arbes. artist
- Josef Kořenský, world traveller for whom Oliva illustrated books
- Luděk Marold, artist
- Karel Vítězslav Mašek, artist
