= Čečelice =

- Municipality
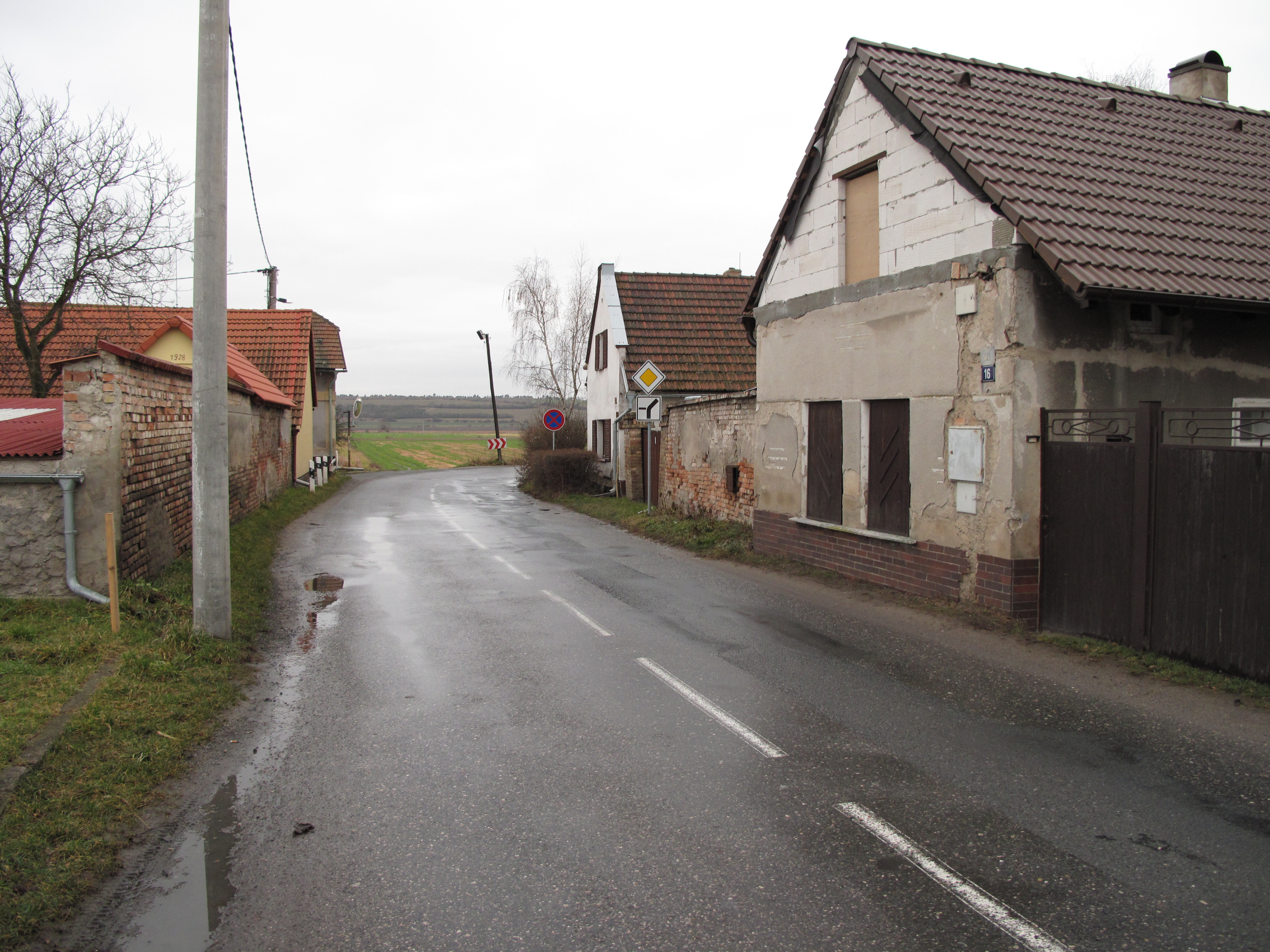
- Road to Všetaty

- Flag Coat of arms

- Location in the Czech Republic
- Coordinates: 50°17′39″N 14°37′7″E
- Country: Czech Republic
- Region: Central Bohemian
- District: Mělník
- First mentioned: 1252

Area
  - Total: 11.55 km^{2} (4.46 sq mi)
- Elevation: 180 m (590 ft)

Population (2026-01-01)
  - Total: 696
  - Density: 60.3/km^{2} (156/sq mi)
- Time zone: UTC+1 (CET)
  - Summer (DST): UTC+2 (CEST)
- Postal code: 277 32
- Website: www.cecelice.cz

Čečelice is a municipality and village in Mělník District in the Central Bohemian Region of the Czech Republic. It has about 700 inhabitants.

== Demographics ==
Historical population
Year	Pop.	±%
1869	723	—
1880	767	+6.1%
1890	789	+2.9%
1900	780	−1.1%
1910	857	+9.9%
1921	953	+11.2%
1930	917	−3.8%
1950	821	−10.5%
1961	789	−3.9%
1970	774	−1.9%
1980	673	−13.0%
1991	577	−14.3%
2001	563	−2.4%
2011	611	+8.5%
2021	669	+9.5%
Source: Censuses
