= Byšice =

- Municipality
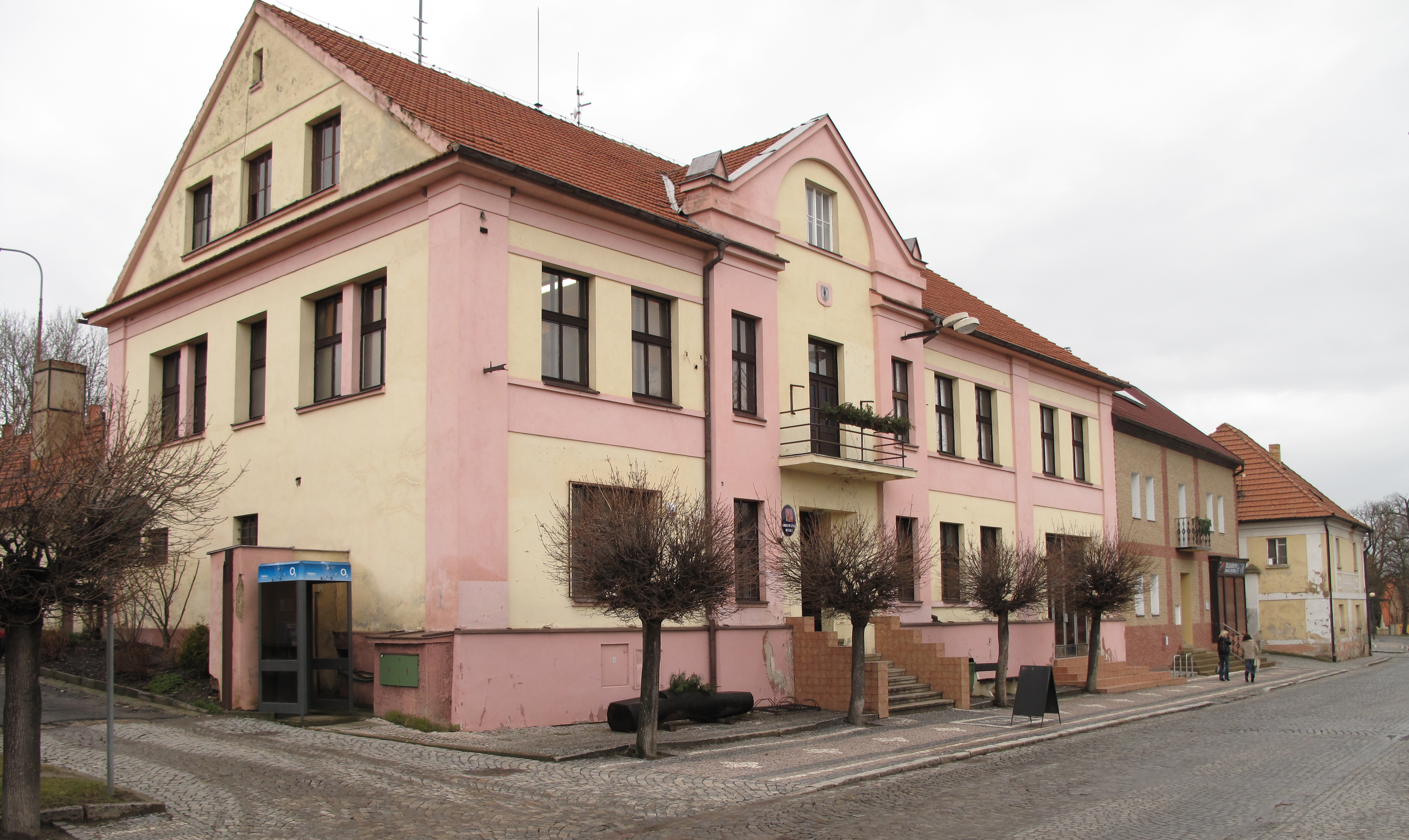
- Municipal office

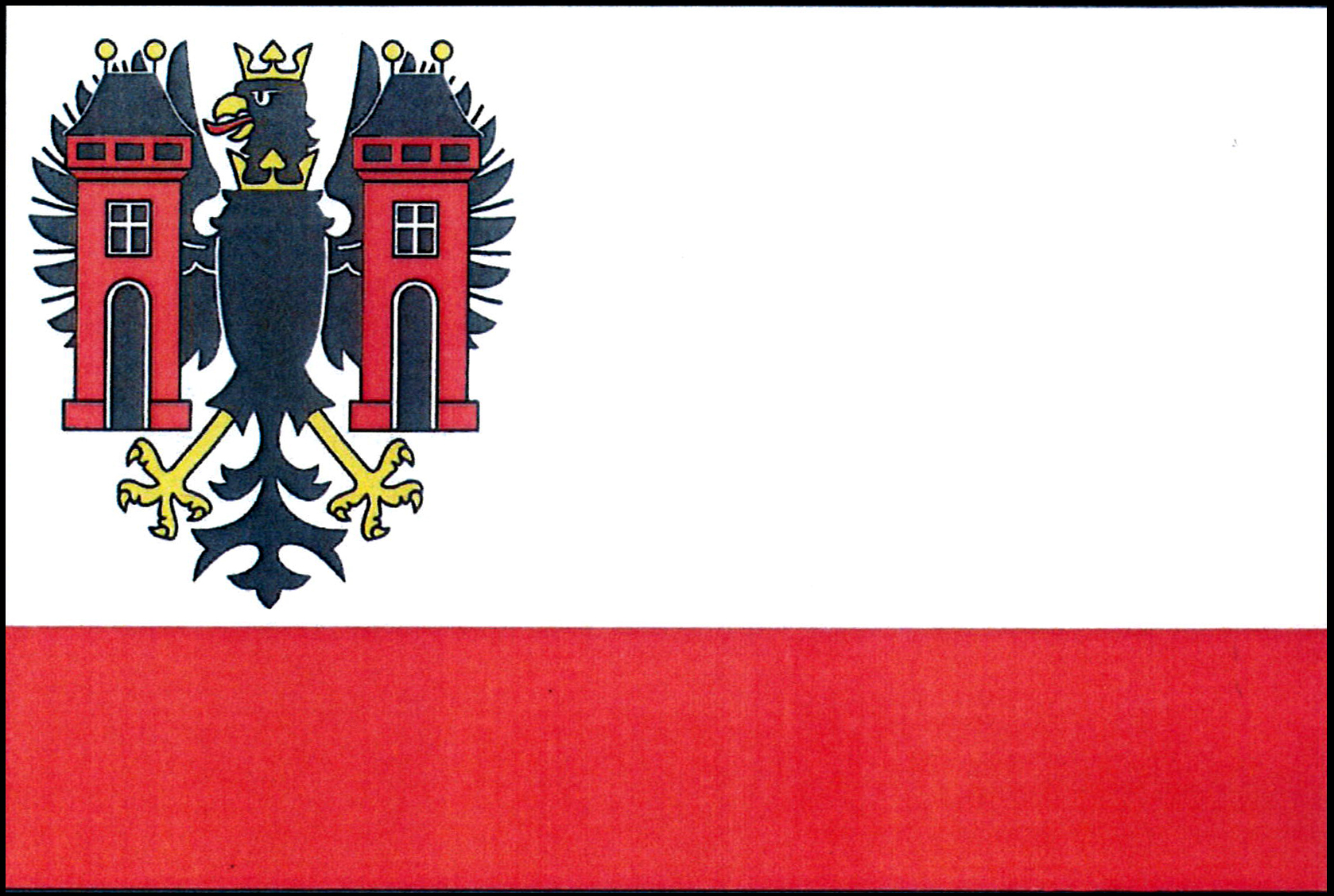
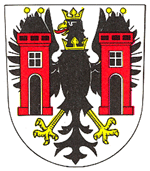
- Flag Coat of arms

- Location in the Czech Republic
- Coordinates: 50°18′38″N 14°36′41″E
- Country: Czech Republic
- Region: Central Bohemian
- District: Mělník
- First mentioned: 1321

Area
  - Total: 10.85 km^{2} (4.19 sq mi)
- Elevation: 195 m (640 ft)

Population (2026-01-01)
  - Total: 1,450
  - Density: 134/km^{2} (346/sq mi)
- Time zone: UTC+1 (CET)
  - Summer (DST): UTC+2 (CEST)
- Postal code: 277 32
- Website: www.bysice.eu

Byšice (German: Bischitz) is a municipality and village in Mělník District in the Central Bohemian Region of the Czech Republic. It has about 1,500 inhabitants.

== Etymology ==
The name is believed to originate from the personal name Byš.

== Geography ==
Byšice is located about 9 kilometres (6 mi) southeast of Mělník and 23 km (14 mi) north of Prague. It lies in the Jizera Table. The highest point is at 279 m (915 ft) above sea level. The stream Košátecký potok flows through the municipality.

== History ==
The first written mention of Byšice is from 1321. The settlement was founded on a trade route from Mělník to Mladá Boleslav. It was an agricultural and market village, in the 19th century it was a market town.

The seal comes from the 15th or 16th century. The coat of arms is derived from this seal.

== Demographics ==
Historical population

Year	Pop.	±%
1869	757	—
1880	1,091	+44.1%
1890	1,077	−1.3%
1900	1,128	+4.7%
1910	1,282	+13.7%

Year	Pop.	±%
1921	1,235	−3.7%
1930	1,301	+5.3%
1950	1,147	−11.8%
1961	1,229	+7.1%
1970	1,295	+5.4%

Year	Pop.	±%
1980	1,168	−9.8%
1991	1,144	−2.1%
2001	1,155	+1.0%
2011	1,320	+14.3%
2021	1,354	+2.6%

Source: Censuses

== Economy ==
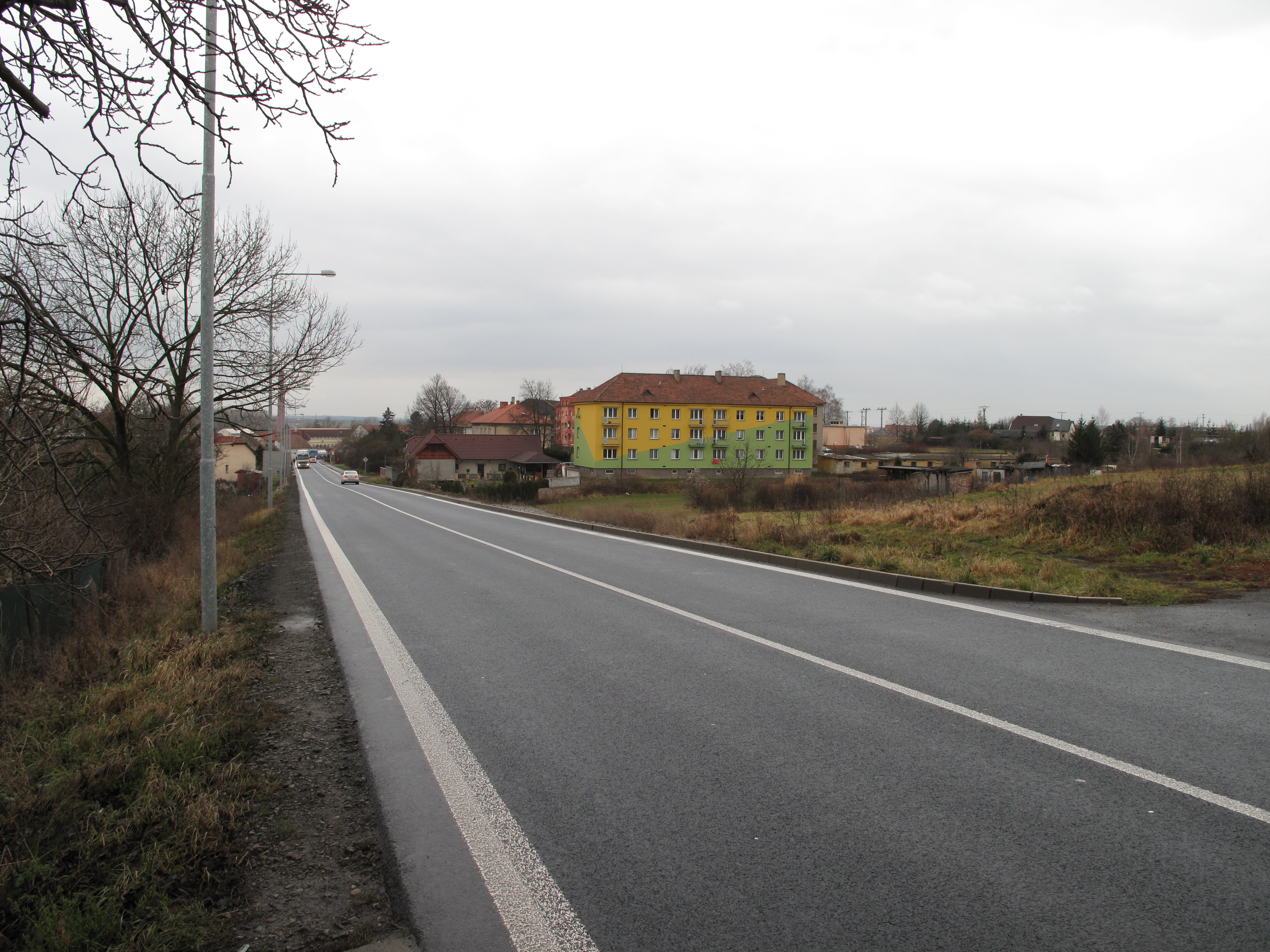
Main road

In Byšice is located one of the most significant Czech food-producing companies, Vitana. The company was founded in 1919 as Graf and it was moved to Byšice in 1927. In 2013, it became a part of the Orkla ASA conglomerate.

A large part of the municipal territory is agricultural land, which is managed by several entities.

== Transport ==
The I/16 road, which connects the D10 motorway with Mělník, runs through the municipality.

== Sights ==
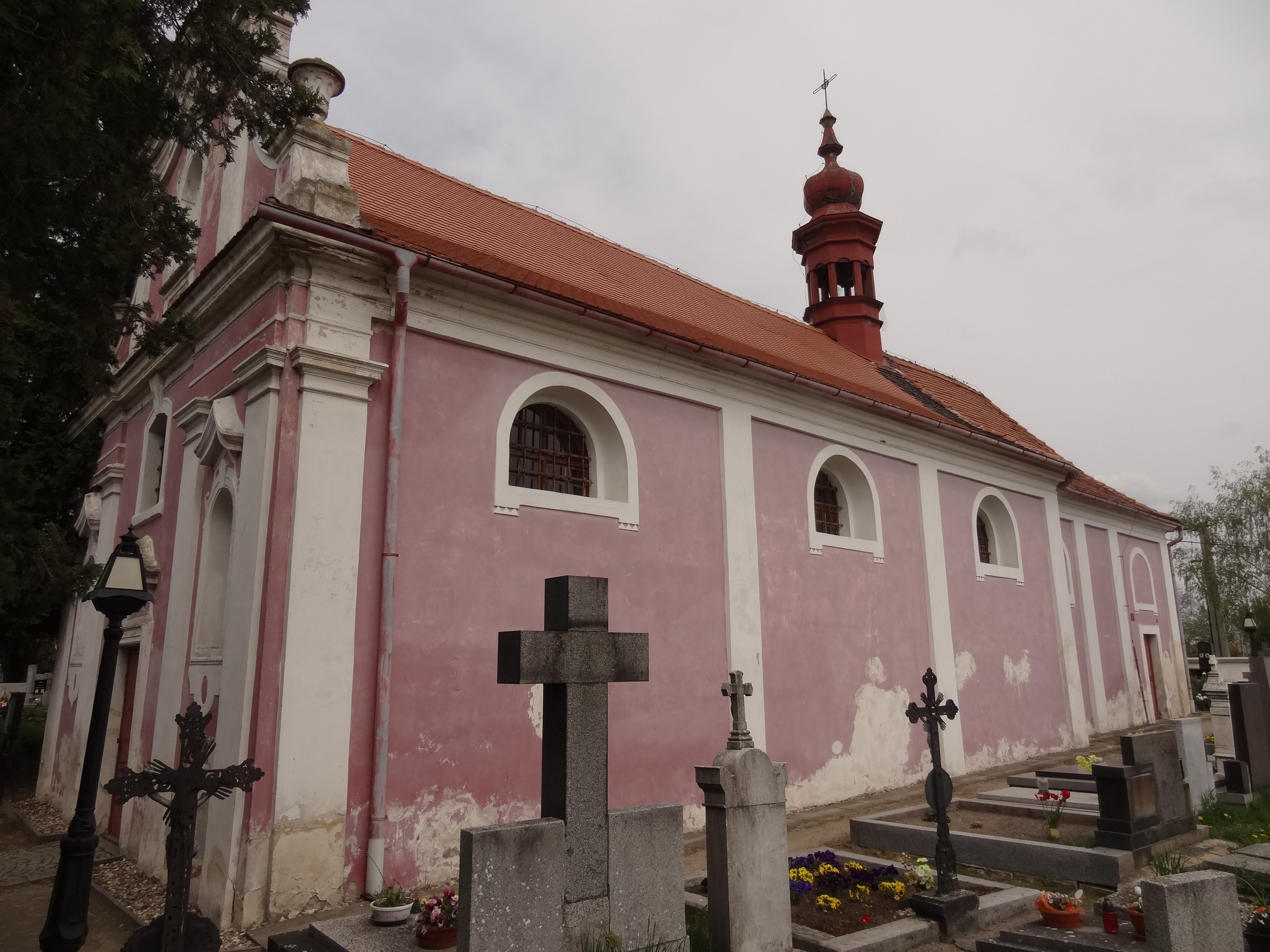
Church of Saint John the Baptist

The most valuable building is the Church of Saint John the Baptist. It was built in the Baroque style in 1690–1693 and modified in the mid-18th century. It is a single-nave church with an elongated floor plan.
