= Sovínky =

- Market town
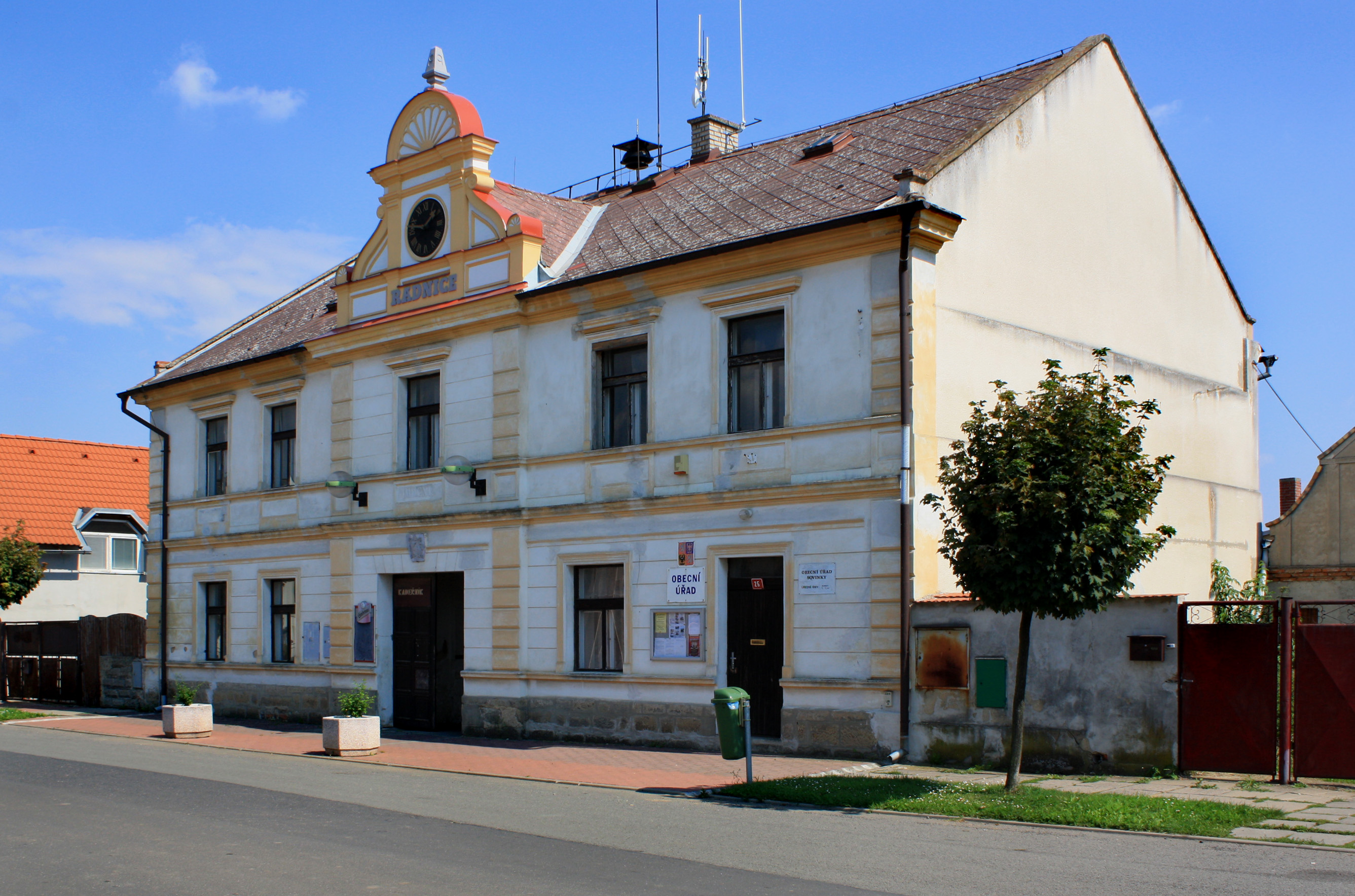
- Municipal office

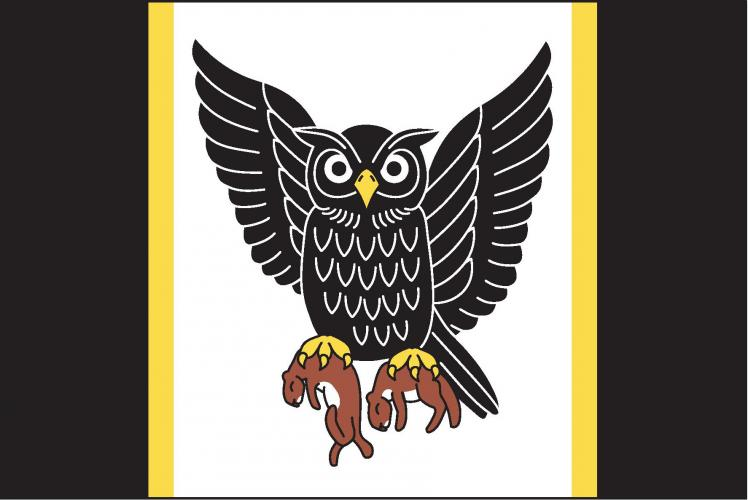
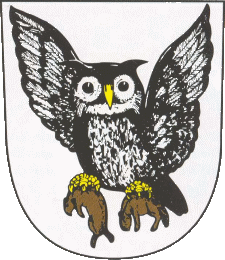
- Flag Coat of arms

- Location in the Czech Republic
- Coordinates: 50°22′23″N 14°47′14″E
- Country: Czech Republic
- Region: Central Bohemian
- District: Mladá Boleslav
- First mentioned: 1360

Area
  - Total: 4.35 km^{2} (1.68 sq mi)
- Elevation: 280 m (920 ft)

Population (2026-01-01)
  - Total: 371
  - Density: 85.3/km^{2} (221/sq mi)
- Time zone: UTC+1 (CET)
  - Summer (DST): UTC+2 (CEST)
- Postal code: 294 29
- Website: sovinky.cz

Sovínky (Czech pronunciation: [ˈsoviːnkɪ]) is a market town in Mladá Boleslav District in the Central Bohemian Region of the Czech Republic. It has about 400 inhabitants.

== Etymology ==
The name is a diminutive of the name Sovenice, derived from the personal name Sovin.

== Geography ==
Sovínky is located about 10 kilometres (6 mi) southwest of Mladá Boleslav and 36 km (22 mi) northeast of Prague. It lies in a flat and mostly agricultural landscape in the Jizera Table. The highest point is the flat hill Niměřický vrch at 290 m (951 ft) above sea level. The stream Košátecký potok flows along the southwestern municipal border.

== History ==
The first written mention of Sovínky is from 1360. The village was promoted to a market town in 1594.

From 1972 to 1990, it was an administrative part of Bezno. Since 1990, it has been a sovereign municipality. The title of a market town was returned to Sovínky in 2006.

== Demographics ==
Historical population

Year	Pop.	±%
1869	365	—
1880	410	+12.3%
1890	420	+2.4%
1900	395	−6.0%
1910	391	−1.0%

Year	Pop.	±%
1921	368	−5.9%
1930	338	−8.2%
1950	255	−24.6%
1961	274	+7.5%
1970	252	−8.0%

Year	Pop.	±%
1980	279	+10.7%
1991	283	+1.4%
2001	302	+6.7%
2011	288	−4.6%
2021	332	+15.3%

Source: Censuses

== Transport ==
There are no railways or major roads passing through the municipality.

== Sights ==
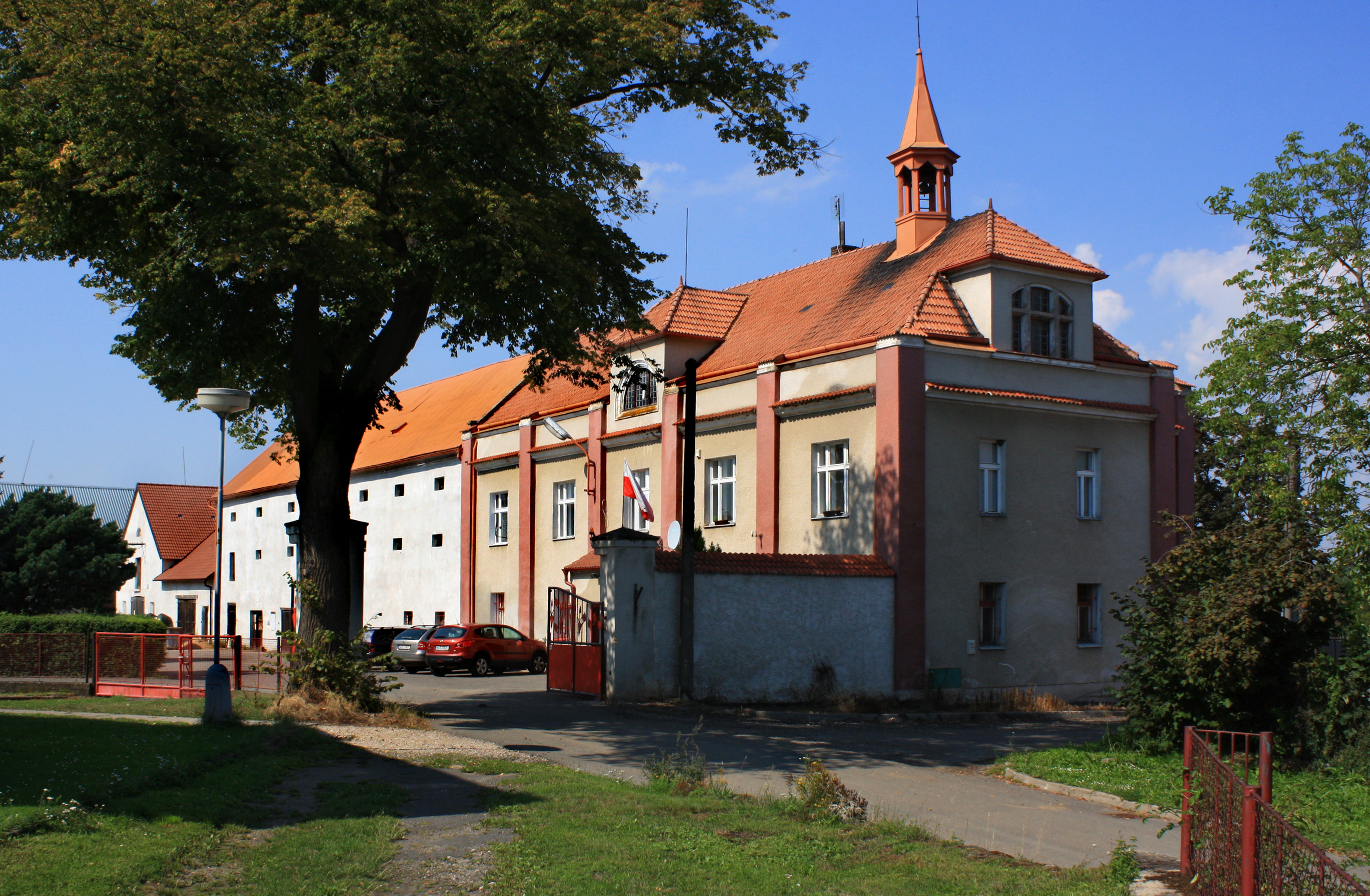
Sovínky Castle

The main landmark of Sovínky is the Sovínky Castle from 1903. Another monument is the town hall, a historic house built in 1640.
