= Chotětov =

- Market town
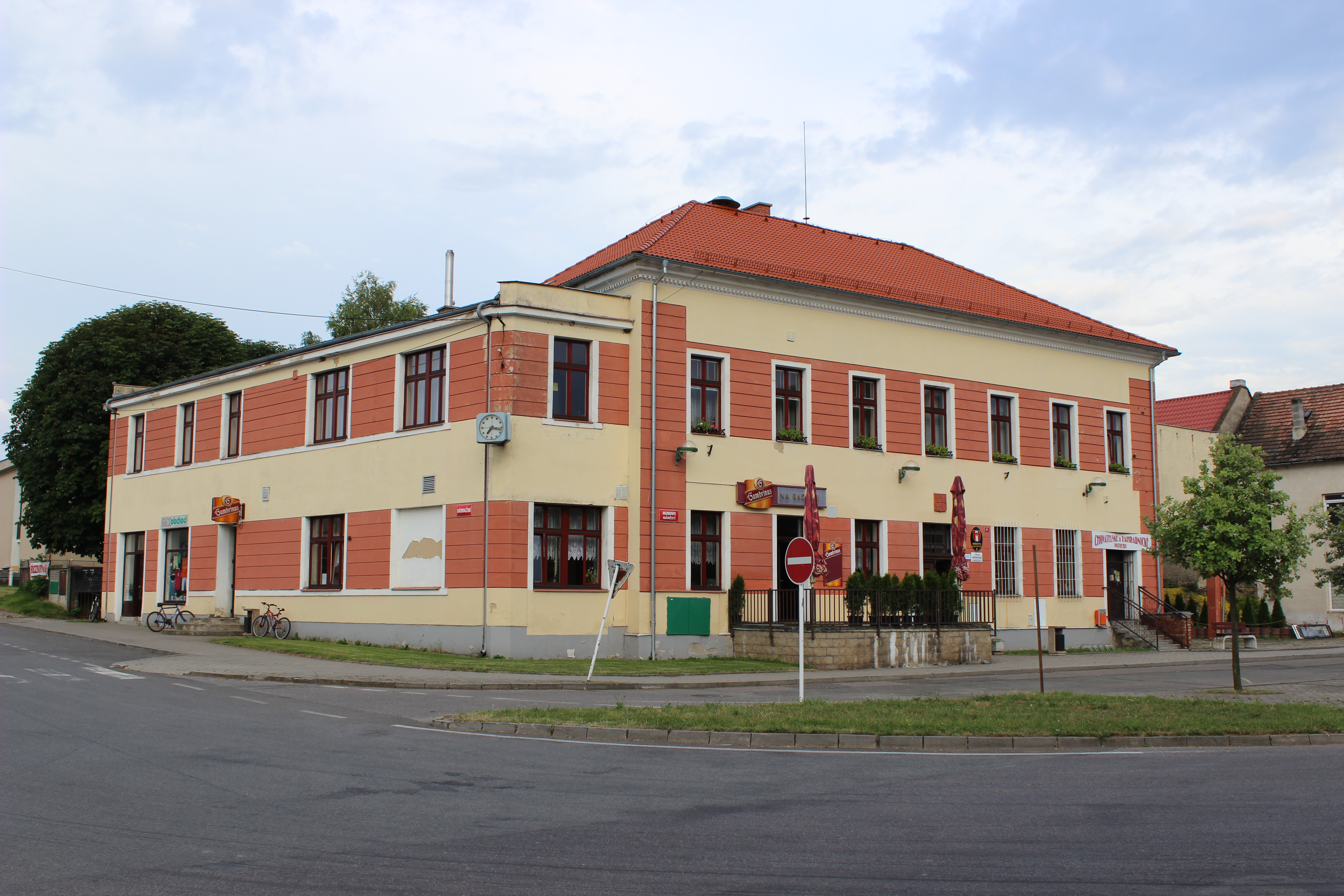
- Municipal office

- Flag Coat of arms

- Location in the Czech Republic
- Coordinates: 50°20′15″N 14°48′6″E
- Country: Czech Republic
- Region: Central Bohemian
- District: Mladá Boleslav
- First mentioned: 1057

Area
  - Total: 13.15 km^{2} (5.08 sq mi)
- Elevation: 268 m (879 ft)

Population (2026-01-01)
  - Total: 1,439
  - Density: 109.4/km^{2} (283.4/sq mi)
- Time zone: UTC+1 (CET)
  - Summer (DST): UTC+2 (CEST)
- Postal code: 294 28
- Website: www.chotetov.cz

Chotětov (Czech pronunciation: [ˈxocɛtof]) is a market town in Mladá Boleslav District in the Central Bohemian Region of the Czech Republic. It has about 1,400 inhabitants.

== Administrative division ==
Chotětov consists of two municipal parts (in brackets population according to the 2021 census):

- Chotětov (1,105)
- Hřivno (242)

== Etymology ==
The name is derived from the personal name Chotěta, meaning "Chotěta's (property)".

== Geography ==
Chotětov is located about 12 kilometres (7 mi) southwest of Mladá Boleslav and 32 km (20 mi) northeast of Prague. It lies in a flat landscape of the Jizera Table. The stream Košátecký potok briefly crosses the municipal territory in the west.

== History ==
The first written mention of Chotětov is from 1057, when Duke Spytihněv II donated the village to the newly established Litoměřice Chapter. After the town of Bělá pod Bezdězem was founded in 1337, it became property of the town. From 1587 until the establishment of independent municipal administration in 1850, Chotětov was part of the Brandýs estate. Construction of the railway was finished in 1865, which started the development of the village. In 1908, Chotětov was promoted to a market town.

== Demographics ==
Historical population

Year	Pop.	±%
1869	609	—
1880	713	+17.1%
1890	799	+12.1%
1900	1,084	+35.7%
1910	1,356	+25.1%

Year	Pop.	±%
1921	1,316	−2.9%
1930	1,275	−3.1%
1950	823	−35.5%
1961	894	+8.6%
1970	847	−5.3%

Year	Pop.	±%
1980	789	−6.8%
1991	779	−1.3%
2001	832	+6.8%
2011	848	+1.9%
2021	1,347	+58.8%

Source: Censuses

== Transport ==
Chotětov is located on the railway line Prague–Turnov.

== Sights ==
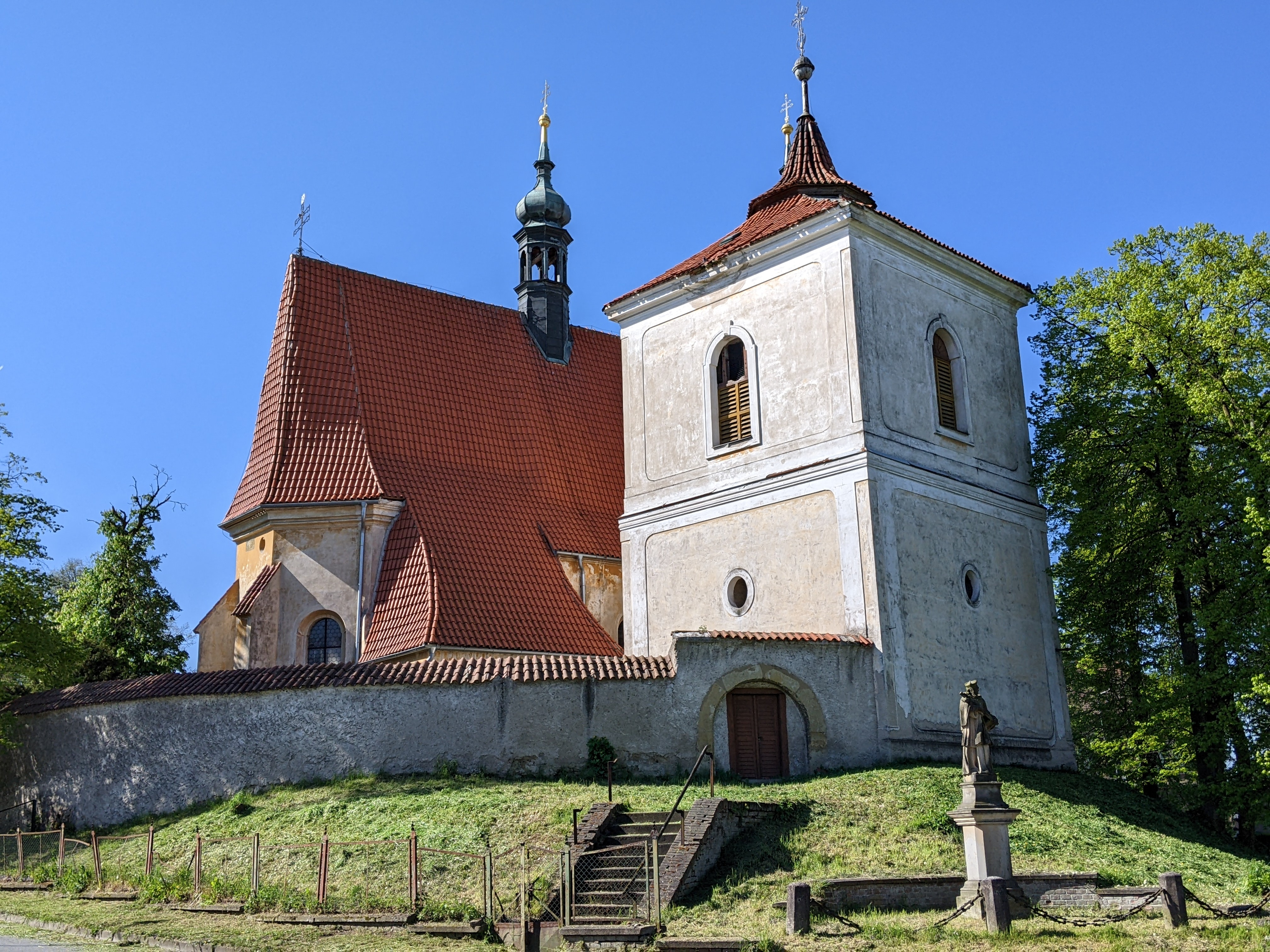
Church of Saint Procopius

The main landmark of Chotětov is the Church of Saint Procopius. It was built in the late Gothic style in 1546.
