= Košátky =

- Municipality
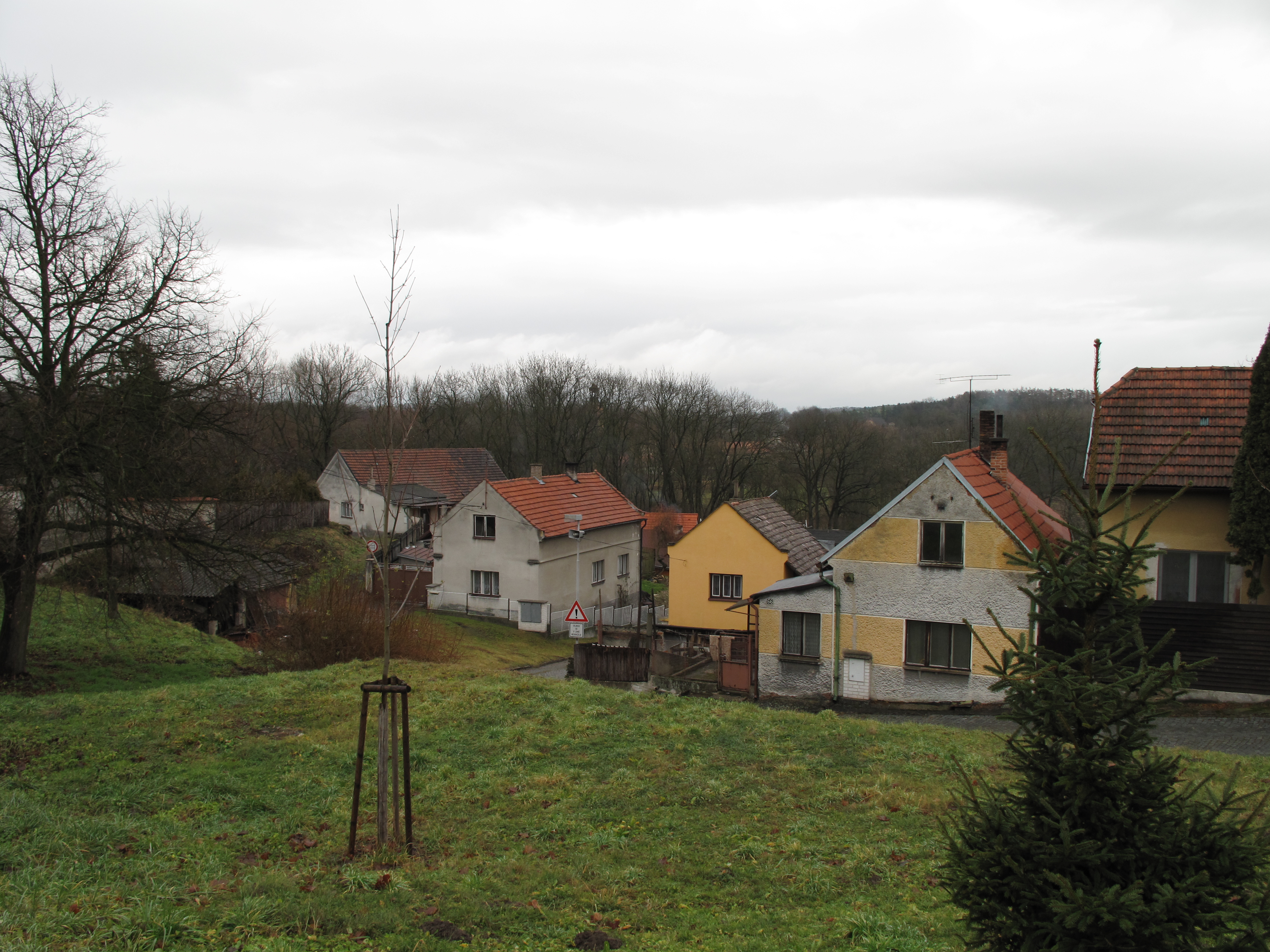
- Centre of Košátky

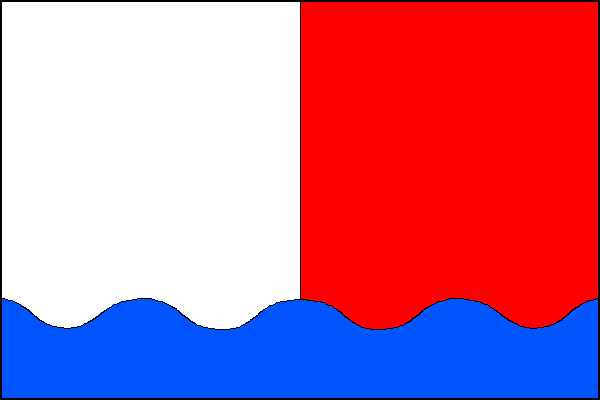
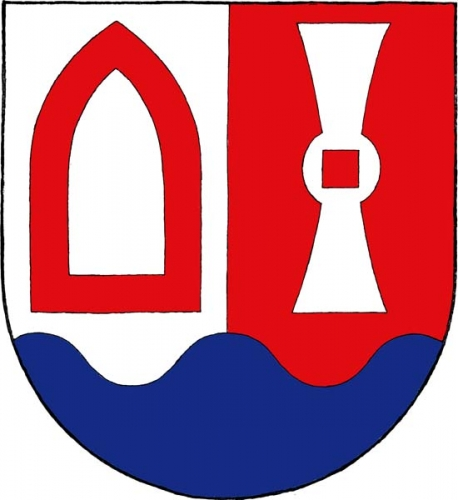
- Flag Coat of arms

- Location in the Czech Republic
- Coordinates: 50°19′4″N 14°40′7″E
- Country: Czech Republic
- Region: Central Bohemian
- District: Mladá Boleslav
- First mentioned: 1365

Area
  - Total: 5.48 km^{2} (2.12 sq mi)
- Elevation: 218 m (715 ft)

Population (2026-01-01)
  - Total: 237
  - Density: 43.2/km^{2} (112/sq mi)
- Time zone: UTC+1 (CET)
  - Summer (DST): UTC+2 (CEST)
- Postal code: 294 79
- Website: www.obec-kosatky.cz

Košátky is a municipality and village in Mladá Boleslav District in the Central Bohemian Region of the Czech Republic. It has about 200 inhabitants.

== Etymology ==
The name is a diminutive of the toponymy Košetice, derived from the personal name Košata.

== Geography ==
Košátky is located about 20 kilometres (12 mi) southwest of Mladá Boleslav and 26 km (16 mi) northeast of Prague. It lies in the Jizera Table. The highest point is at 263 m (863 ft) above sea level. The stream Košátecký potok flows through the municipality.

== History ==
The first written mention of Košátky is from 1365, when the village was bought by the Weimile family. The Weitmiles had built here a fortress after the Hussite Wars (after 1434). East of the fortress, houses for craftsmen and farm workers began to be built. At the turn of the 15th and 16th century, this new settlement was given the name Nové Košátky ('new Košátky'), while the original village began to be called Staré Košátky ('old Košátky'). In the 16th century, the Košátky area was acquired by the Novohradský branch of the Kolowrat family.

The railway was built in 1865. From the establishment of independent municipalities in 1850 until the year 1920, Staré Košátky and Nové Košátky were municipal parts of Kojovice. In 1921, Staré Košátky and Nové Košátky created a separate municipality called just Košátky, and Staré Košátky and Nové Košátky were its municipal parts. From 1973 to 1989, Staré Košátky and Nové Košátky were municipal parts of Kropáčova Vrutice. Since 1990, Košátky has been a separate municipality, which is not further subdivided.

== Demographics ==
Historical population

Year	Pop.	±%
1869	380	—
1880	365	−3.9%
1890	365	+0.0%
1900	336	−7.9%
1910	313	−6.8%

Year	Pop.	±%
1921	330	+5.4%
1930	358	+8.5%
1950	312	−12.8%
1961	384	+23.1%
1970	307	−20.1%

Year	Pop.	±%
1980	326	+6.2%
1991	238	−27.0%
2001	138	−42.0%
2011	203	+47.1%
2021	228	+12.3%

Source: Censuses

== Transport ==
Košátky is located on the railway line Prague–Mladá Boleslav.

== Sights ==
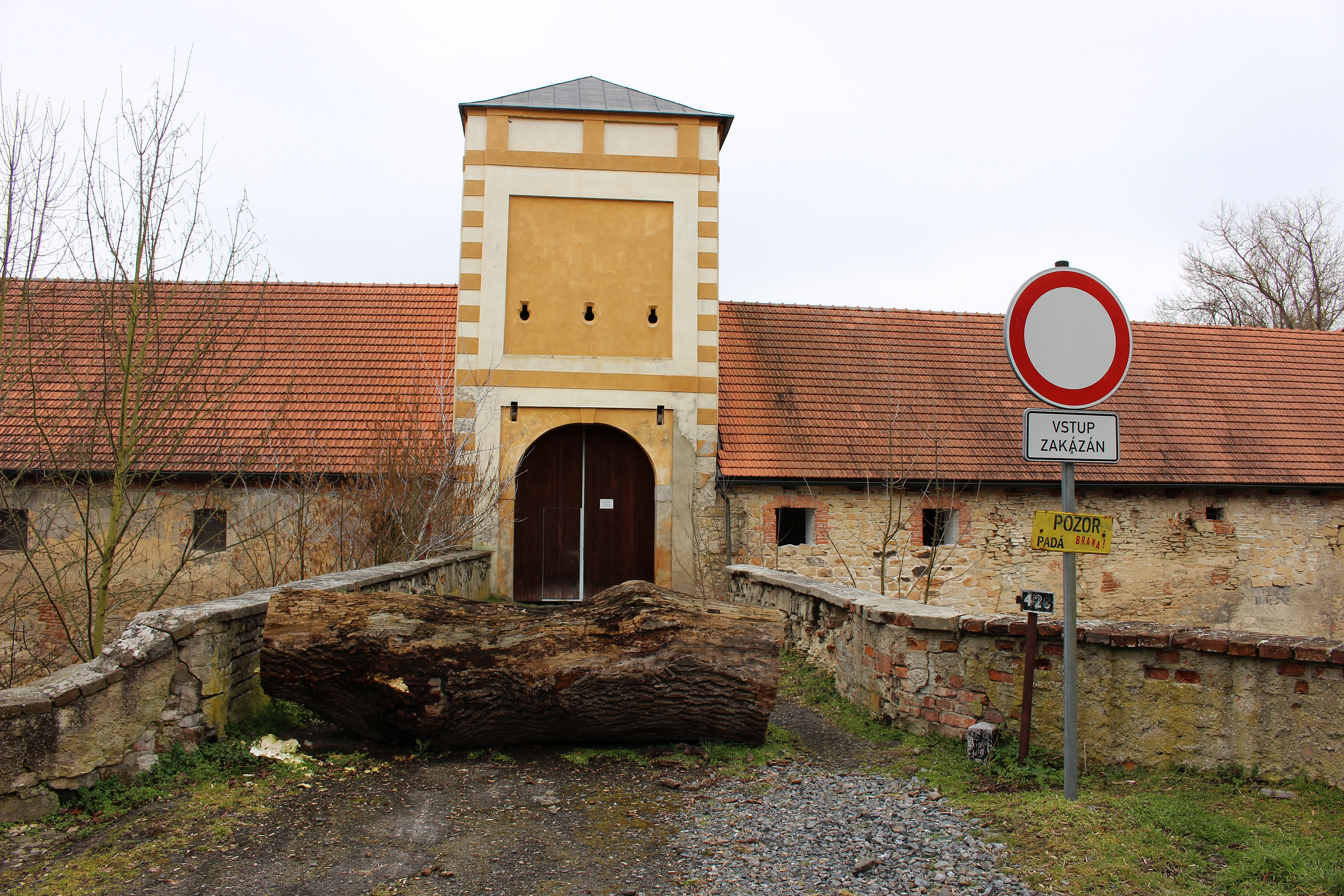
Entrance to Košátky Castle

The main landmark of Košátky is the Košátky Castle. It is a large complex of several buildings (castle, granary, farm buildings, tower gates). Originally it was a Gothic fortress from the 15th century, rebuilt in the Renaissance style in the 16th century and later modified in the Baroque and Neoclassical styles. The buildings are surrounded by meadows and a pheasantry that also belong to the castle complex. In modern times, part of the area is used for residential and recreational purposes, and part is unused, awaiting reconstruction.
