= Všetaty (Mělník District) =

- Market town
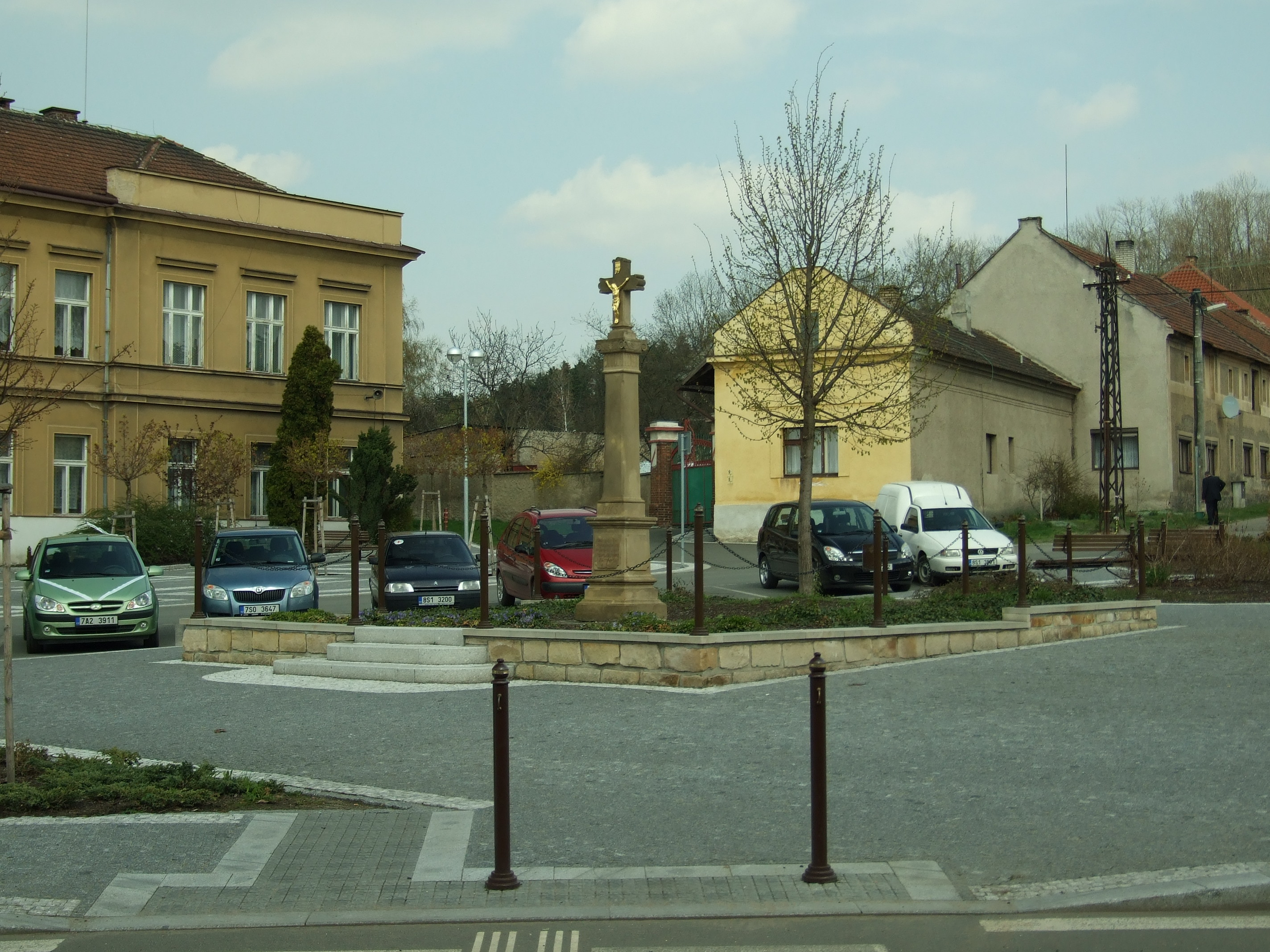
- Main square in Všetaty

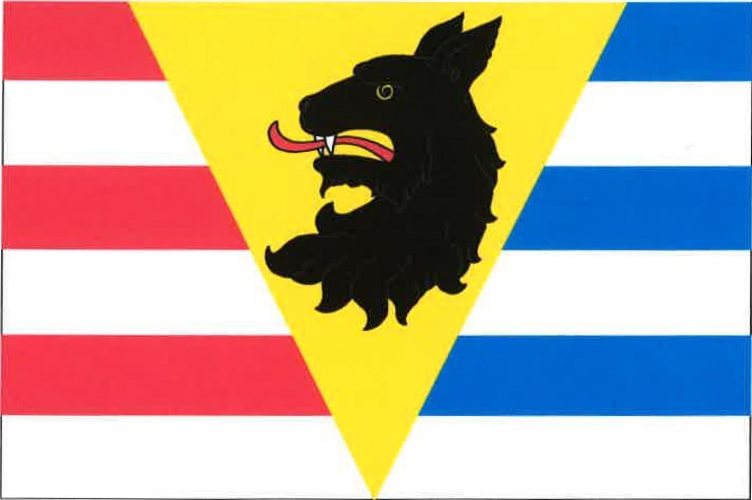
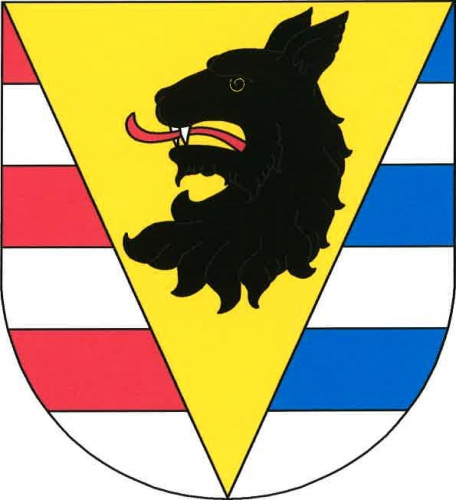
- Flag Coat of arms

- Location in the Czech Republic
- Coordinates: 50°16′55″N 14°35′35″E
- Country: Czech Republic
- Region: Central Bohemian
- District: Mělník
- First mentioned: 1255

Area
  - Total: 12.87 km^{2} (4.97 sq mi)
- Elevation: 175 m (574 ft)

Population (2026-01-01)
  - Total: 2,495
  - Density: 193.9/km^{2} (502.1/sq mi)
- Time zone: UTC+1 (CET)
  - Summer (DST): UTC+2 (CEST)
- Postal code: 277 16
- Website: www.mestys-vsetaty.cz

Všetaty (Czech pronunciation: [ˈfʃɛtatɪ]) is a market town in Mělník District in the Central Bohemian Region of the Czech Republic. It has about 2,500 inhabitants.

== Administrative division ==
Všetaty consists of two municipal parts (in brackets population according to the 2021 census):

- Všetaty (1,567)
- Přívory (775)

== Geography ==
Všetaty is located about 20 kilometres (12 mi) north of Prague. It lies in the Central Elbe Table. The highest point is the flat hill Cecemín at 239 m (784 ft) above sea level. The stream Košátecký potok flows through the market town.

== History ==
The first written mention of Všetaty is from 1255. Přívory was first mentioned in 1321. The railway was built in 1864, but the station was not opened until 1873.

== Demographics ==
Historical population

| Year | Pop. | ±% |
|---|---|---|
| 1869 | 1,413 | — |
| 1880 | 1,541 | +9.1% |
| 1890 | 1,631 | +5.8% |
| 1900 | 1,922 | +17.8% |
| 1910 | 2,138 | +11.2% |

| Year | Pop. | ±% |
|---|---|---|
| 1921 | 2,232 | +4.4% |
| 1930 | 2,885 | +29.3% |
| 1950 | 2,646 | −8.3% |
| 1961 | 2,605 | −1.5% |
| 1970 | 2,498 | −4.1% |

| Year | Pop. | ±% |
|---|---|---|
| 1980 | 2,210 | −11.5% |
| 1991 | 1,992 | −9.9% |
| 2001 | 1,941 | −2.6% |
| 2011 | 2,184 | +12.5% |
| 2021 | 2,342 | +7.2% |

Source: Censuses

== Transport ==
Všetaty is an important railway hub. Two main railway lines Prague–Turnov and Kolín–Ústí nad Labem cross here.

== Sights ==
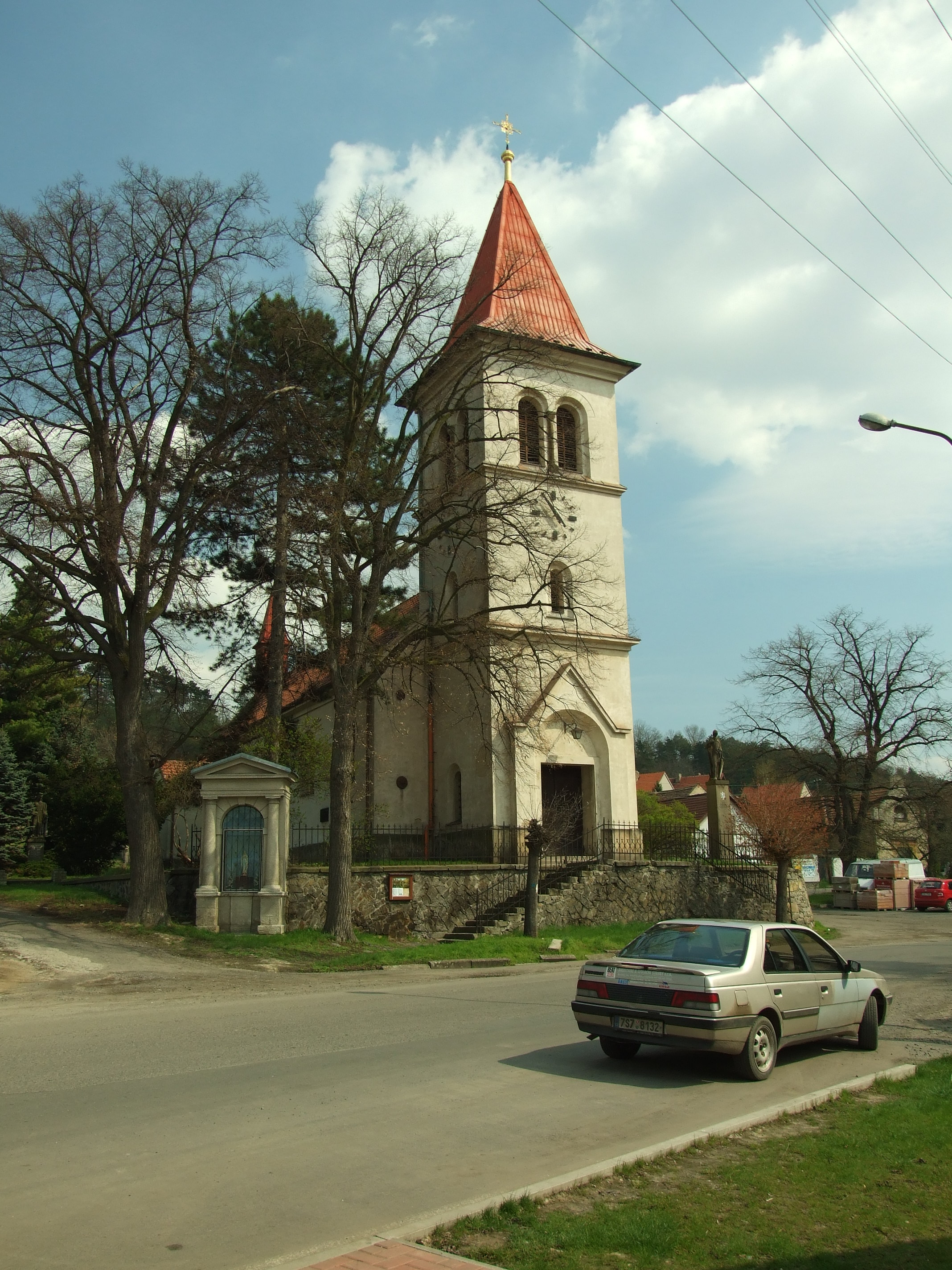
Church of Saints Peter and Paul

The main landmark of Všetaty is the Church of Saints Peter and Paul. It was built in the Baroque style in 1780 and rebuilt in the Neo-Romanesque style in 1885.

The Jan Palach Memorial was founded in the original house where the Palach family lived. It houses an exhibition focused on the actions of Jan Palach and the time in which he lived.

== Notable people ==
- Jan Palach (1948–1969), student who self-immolated himself in a protest against the Warsaw Pact invasion of Czechoslovakia
