= Josef Kořenský =

Josef Kořenský RNDr.
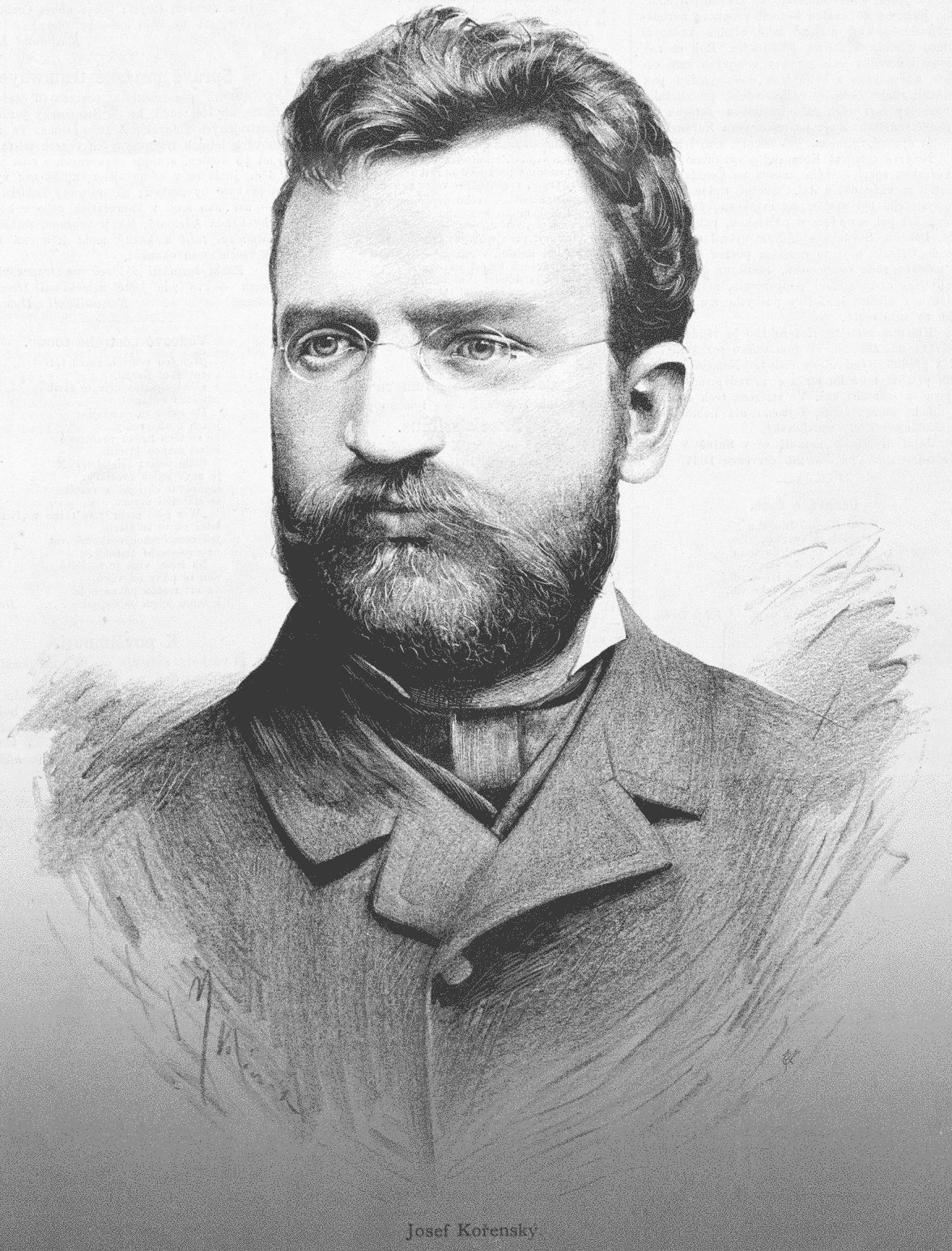
- Born: 26 July 1847; Sušno, Bohemia, Austrian Empire
- Died: 8 October 1938 (aged 91); Smíchov, Prague, Czechoslovakia
- Occupations: traveller, teacher, educator, writer

Josef Kořenský (26 July 1847 – 8 October 1938) was a Czech traveller, educator and writer. He recorded and conveyed knowledge about the places on our planet that had been explored. He significantly contributed to the spreading of knowledge about the world in the Czech society, mainly in the first half of the 20th century.

== Life ==
Kořenský was born as a second of five children in Sušno by Mladá Boleslav in a poor family of a farmer. Since his childhood, he had a passion for music and natural history, which did not change for the rest of his life. He studied in Prague to be a teacher in teacher training programs. During this period, he met a number of travellers in the house U Halánků, including Emil Holub, they were born in the same year and they remained close friends for the rest of their lives. As a keen naturalist, Kořenský also worked in the Prague Museum, where he assisted Antonin Fritsch.

His teaching career began in Radnice near Rokycany in 1867. He worked there as an assistant and he continued as a teacher in Litomyšl in 1871. In 1874, he was appointed as a teacher in Smíchov, Prague. Prague offered cultural and educational opportunities he was seeking.

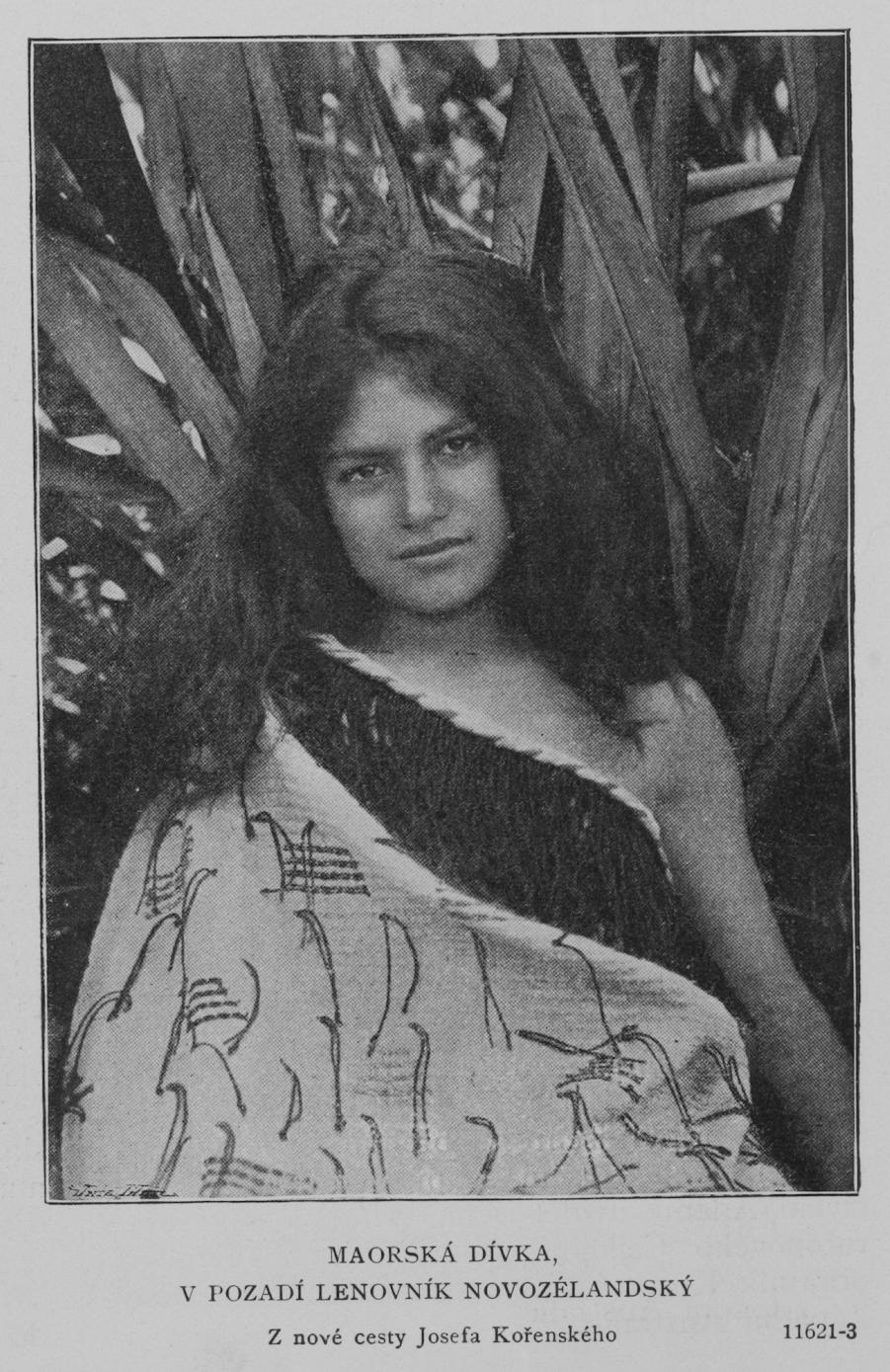
Maori girl, New Zealand

His first bigger travel took place in 1872 during his stay in Litomyšl. He visited the Alps and this trip was followed by other tours of Europe, which was repeated almost every summer. He used the opportunity of summer school holidays and the generosity of financial support of individuals such as Vojta Náprstek, František Ringhoffer, and associations such as Svatobor, along with Smíchov City Council, school authorities, Viennese Ministry of Culture and Education and other institutions. They were all convinced that Kořenský's travels will bring benefits in museum collections and in the knowledge that can be passed by Kořenský not only to children, but also to general public.

He set off on each journey perfectly prepared, studying available literature and languages. He knew German, French and English, but had no difficulties with other languages, which can be proved by his translations from Norwegian. His itinerary was always clear and precise and his travels were a verification of the facts he had already known from his research. He believed that a teacher should travel as much as possible to be perfectly informed about the situation abroad. Children can be taught only through a genuine personal experience. While on the road, he carefully noted all aspects of the natural world, as well as all features of economic, cultural and religious life of the society. As a teacher, he naturally paid attention to the education of various nations, which then enriched his own teaching practice.

He completed two biggest and longest journeys during his lifetime. He travelled around the world and he also visited Australia and New Zealand. His round the world travel started in 1893, he was accompanied by his friend Karel Řezníček (1845–1914), a beer brewer from Hrubá Skála. They sailed out the German harbour Bremen, crossing the Atlantic to visit the World's Fair in Chicago. Naturally, other American cities and sights were visited on the way, for example Niagara Falls and Yellowstone National Park. They continued towards the Pacific and then to Japan on a steamship, with a short stopover in Hawaii. China and Hong Kong came next, with further sea voyage to Malay Peninsula and Java before crossing the Indian Ocean to Ceylon. They then continued overland to Darjeeling and under the Himalayas to Mumbai and then again on a steamer to the Red Sea and Egypt to study the ancient Egyptian history. They returned to Prague via Trieste in 1894.

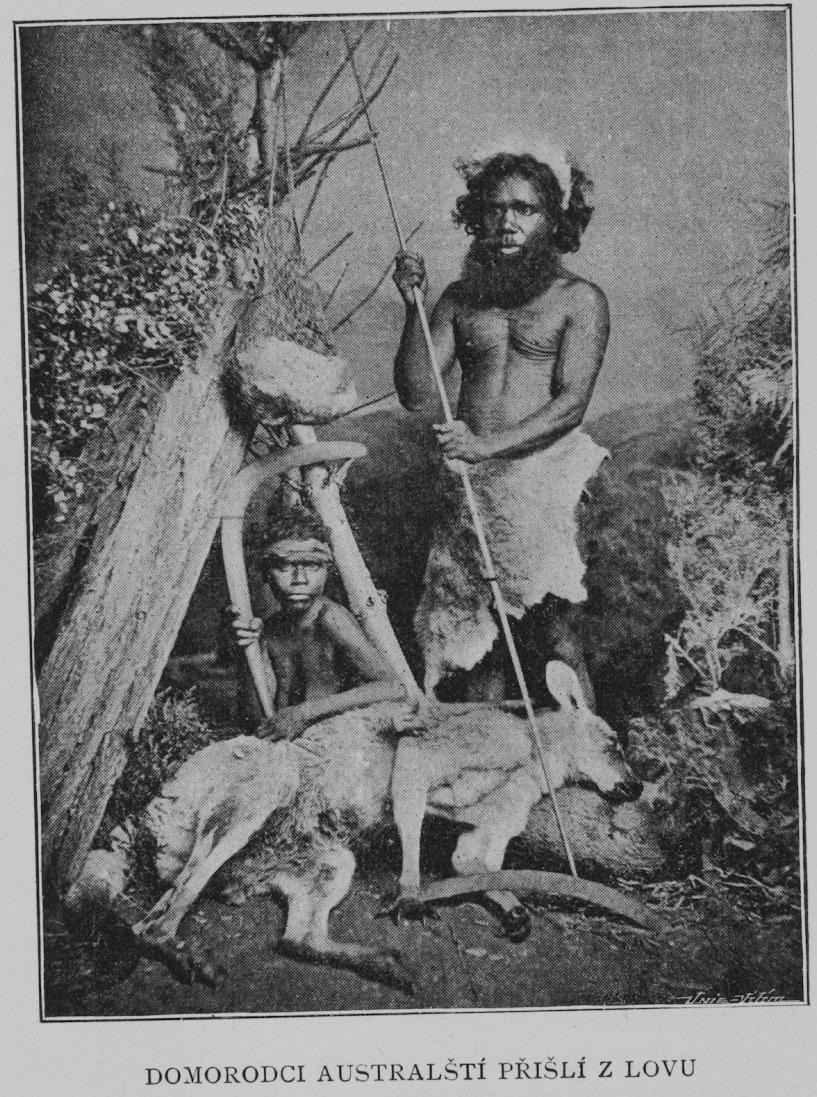
Indigenous Australian hunters

His second great expedition took place in 1900–1901. He sailed out of Naples through the Suez Canal to Aden and Colombo and then to West Australian Perth, Adelaide and through Ballarat to Melbourne. His next destination was Tasmania and New Zealand, with Dunedin, Christchurch and Wellington, where he met a famous Czech painter Gottfried Lindauer (1839–1926), who painted portraits of Maori population. From Auckland, he sailed to explore the archipelagos of Oceania – Tonga, Samoa and Fiji. He returned to Australia to Sydney and then went by train to Brisbane. His next destination was the island of Celebes, followed by Java, where he visited the temple complex of Borobudur and the city of Bandung and Batavia. Singapore, Bangkok and Hong Kong came next. He then visited his favourite Japan again, Kobe, Tokyo and Massif Haruna west of Tokyo. From the port Shimonoseki he went to Korea (he stopped in Pusan and Wonsan), then to Vladivostok and along the Amur river, Khabarovsk and along the Trans-Siberian Railway through Irkutsk to Novosibirsk. Finally, across Ural to Moscow and Prague.

Kořenský never explored any unknown parts of the world, in fact, he more thoroughly explored the known world, he recorded it and mediated the knowledge to his pupils and general public. He was an expert naturalist and a keen collector. He frequently published books on his travels, they were written especially for young people, which had an obvious positive impact on the entire population. He was a member of the younger generation of travellers around Vojta Náprstek and he was one of the three most popular travellers of young Czechoslovakia, along with Vráz and Holub. He greatly contributed to the expanding of the horizons of the Czech nation, who were at that time being gradually integrated into the world. He also maintained contact with Czech ex-pats, who lived in the world.

He was a member of the Administrative Committee of the National Museum and a number of prestigious institutions, such as the Oriental Institute of the Czechoslovakia. The greatest tribute to his efforts in the field of science was awarded in 1927: an honorary doctorate of Natural Sciences of Charles University. In 1920s', he was the first traveller to be invited as a host to the Czech Radio broadcasts on a regular basis. He died in Smíchov in 1938, at the age of 91.

His memorial plaque can be found in the native Sušno. In Prague Smíchov, there is a street and an elementary school bearing his name. For a full list of his travels and published books, see the Czech Wikipedia.
