= Nemyslovice =

- Municipality
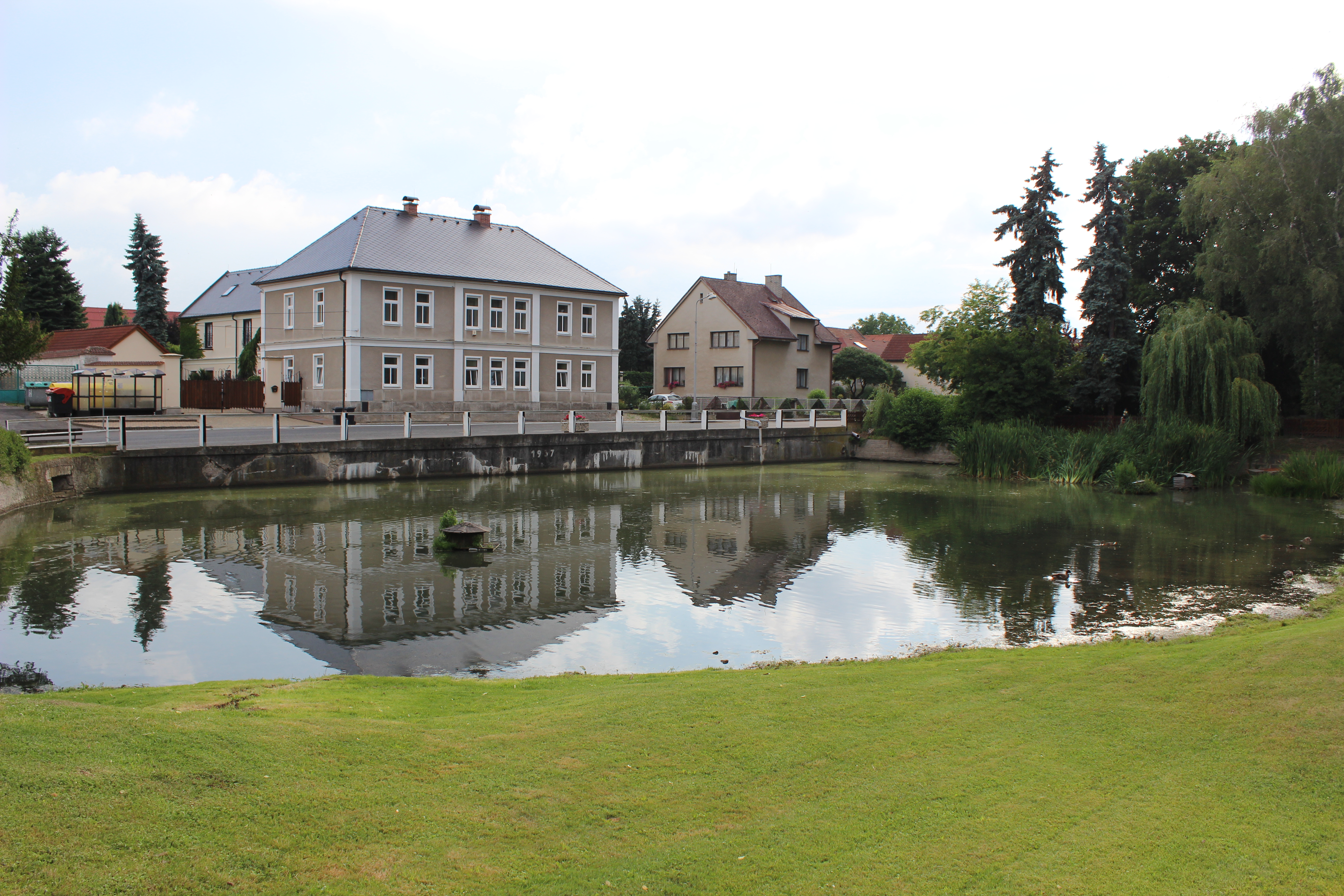
- Pond in Nemyslovice

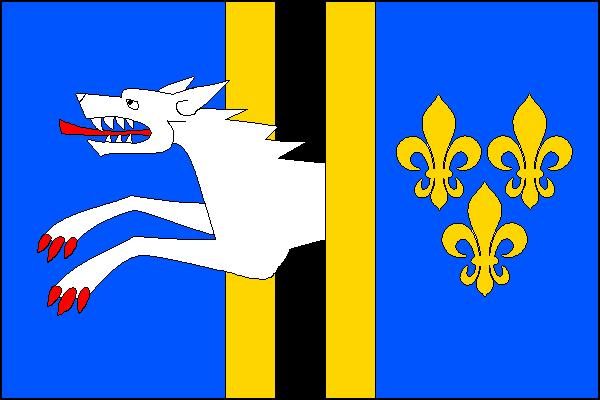
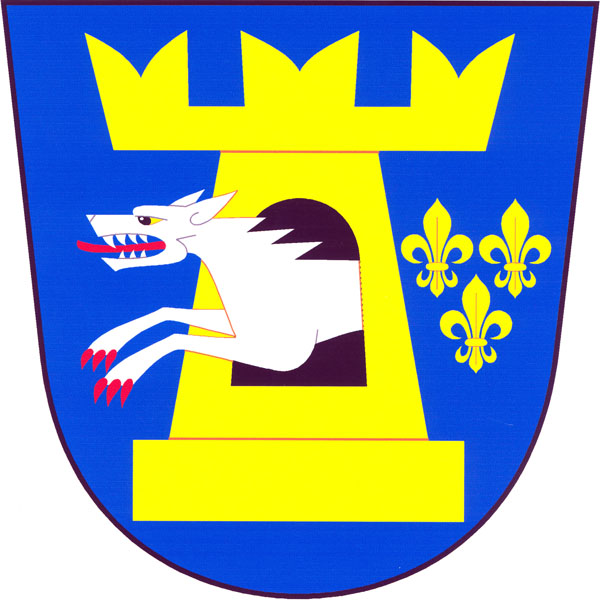
- Flag Coat of arms

- Location in the Czech Republic
- Coordinates: 50°21′31″N 14°45′50″E
- Country: Czech Republic
- Region: Central Bohemian
- District: Mladá Boleslav
- First mentioned: 1292

Area
  - Total: 5.03 km^{2} (1.94 sq mi)
- Elevation: 265 m (869 ft)

Population (2026-01-01)
  - Total: 167
  - Density: 33.2/km^{2} (86.0/sq mi)
- Time zone: UTC+1 (CET)
  - Summer (DST): UTC+2 (CEST)
- Postal code: 294 29
- Website: www.nemyslovice.cz

Nemyslovice is a municipality and village in Mladá Boleslav District in the Central Bohemian Region of the Czech Republic. It has about 200 inhabitants.

== Demographics ==
Historical population
Year	Pop.	±%
1869	284	—
1880	317	+11.6%
1890	352	+11.0%
1900	371	+5.4%
1910	328	−11.6%
1921	362	+10.4%
1930	339	−6.4%
1950	200	−41.0%
1961	215	+7.5%
1970	181	−15.8%
1980	136	−24.9%
1991	127	−6.6%
2001	139	+9.4%
2011	145	+4.3%
2021	145	+0.0%
Source: Censuses
