= Vrátno =

- Municipality
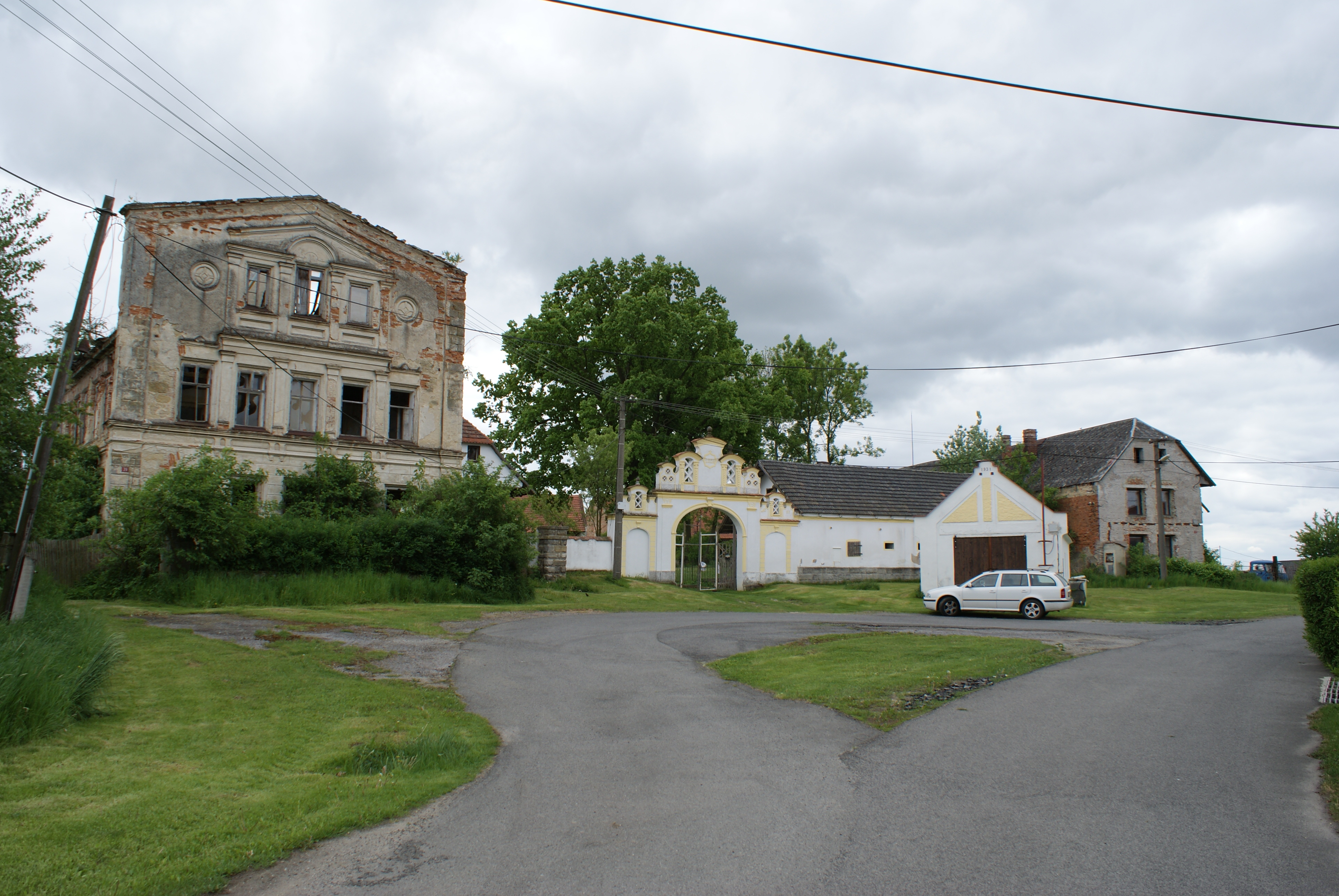
- Homestead in Vrátno

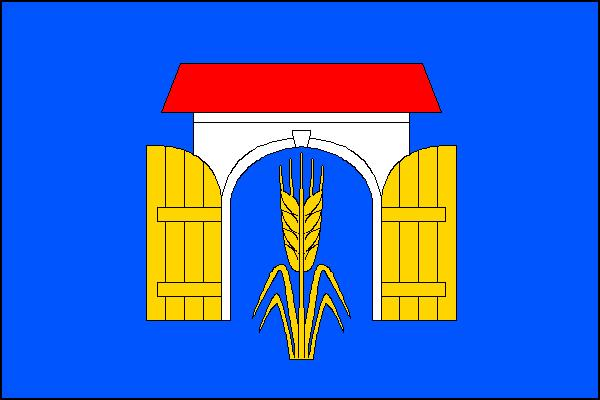
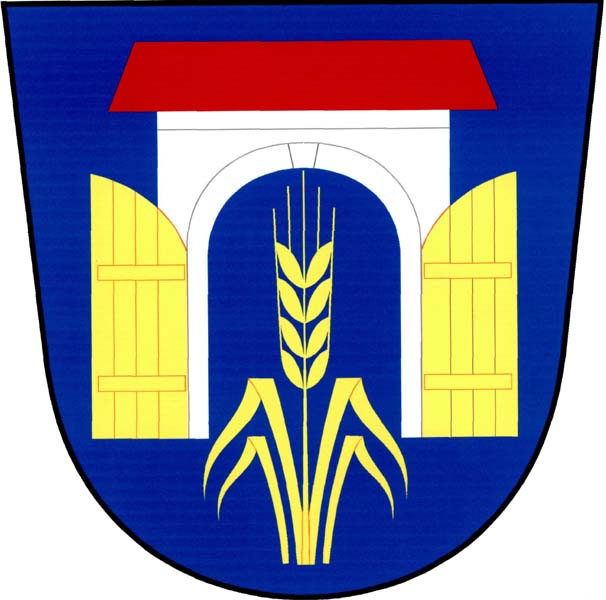
- Flag Coat of arms

- Location in the Czech Republic
- Coordinates: 50°25′58″N 14°41′37″E
- Country: Czech Republic
- Region: Central Bohemian
- District: Mladá Boleslav
- First mentioned: 1348

Area
  - Total: 5.93 km^{2} (2.29 sq mi)
- Elevation: 307 m (1,007 ft)

Population (2026-01-01)
  - Total: 160
  - Density: 27/km^{2} (70/sq mi)
- Time zone: UTC+1 (CET)
  - Summer (DST): UTC+2 (CEST)
- Postal code: 294 26
- Website: www.vratno.cz

Vrátno is a municipality and village in Mladá Boleslav District in the Central Bohemian Region of the Czech Republic. It has about 200 inhabitants.

== Demographics ==
Historical population
Year	Pop.	±%
1869	310	—
1880	316	+1.9%
1890	331	+4.7%
1900	348	+5.1%
1910	427	+22.7%
1921	396	−7.3%
1930	293	−26.0%
1950	235	−19.8%
1961	253	+7.7%
1970	222	−12.3%
1980	145	−34.7%
1991	112	−22.8%
2001	114	+1.8%
2011	103	−9.6%
2021	151	+46.6%
Source: Censuses
