= Kropáčova Vrutice =

- Municipality
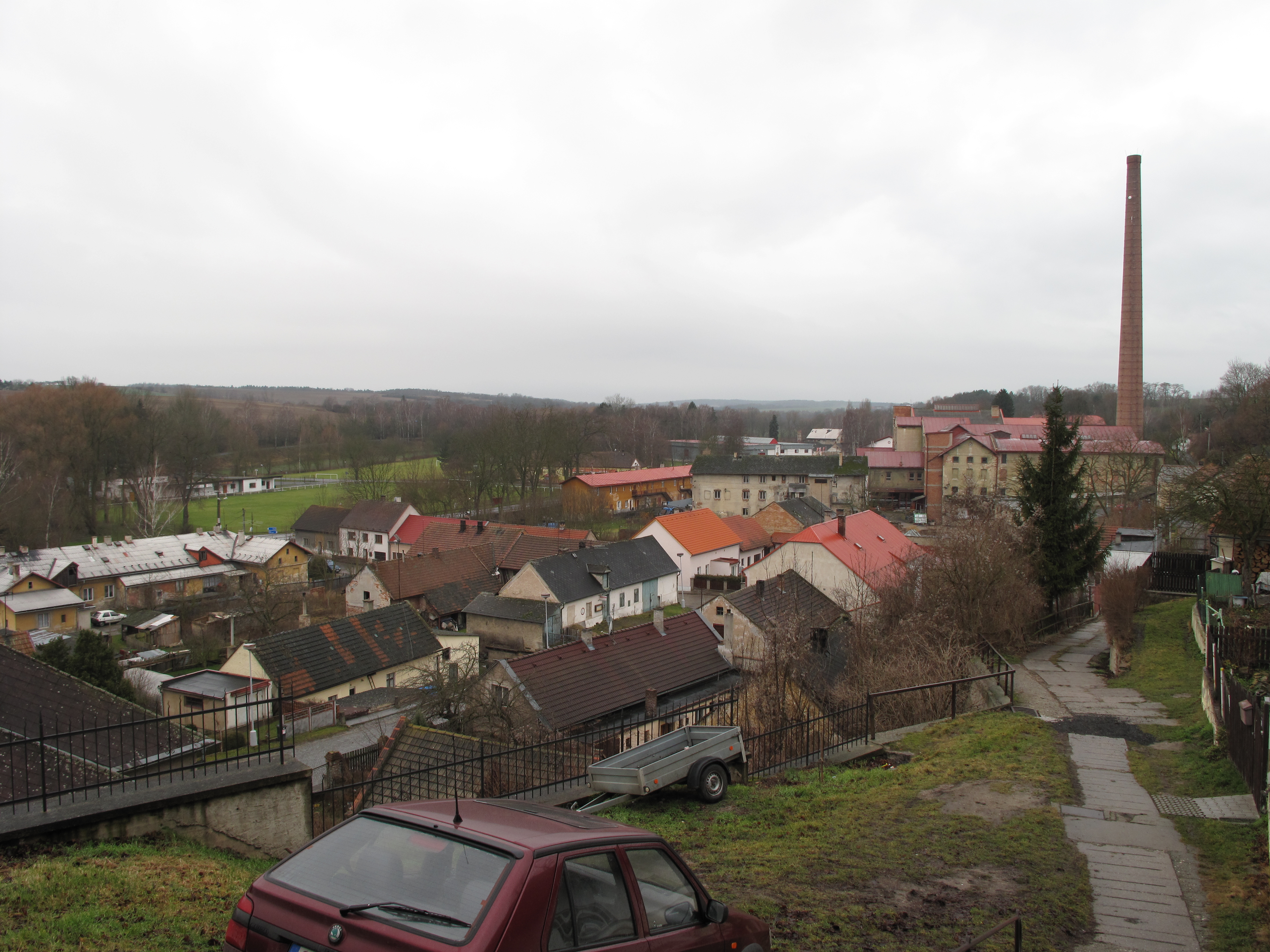
- Western part of Kropáčova Vrutice

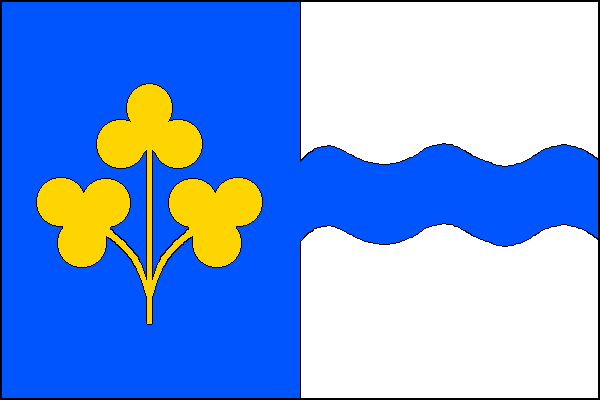
- Flag Coat of arms

- Location in the Czech Republic
- Coordinates: 50°19′50″N 14°43′3″E
- Country: Czech Republic
- Region: Central Bohemian
- District: Mladá Boleslav
- First mentioned: 1385

Area
  - Total: 24.09 km^{2} (9.30 sq mi)
- Elevation: 225 m (738 ft)

Population (2026-01-01)
  - Total: 940
  - Density: 39/km^{2} (100/sq mi)
- Time zone: UTC+1 (CET)
  - Summer (DST): UTC+2 (CEST)
- Postal code: 294 79
- Website: www.kropacovavrutice.cz

Kropáčova Vrutice is a municipality and village in Mladá Boleslav District in the Central Bohemian Region of the Czech Republic. It has about 900 inhabitants.

== Administrative division ==
Kropáčova Vrutice consists of five municipal parts (in brackets population according to the 2021 census):

- Kropáčova Vrutice (314)
- Kojovice (75)
- Krpy (240)
- Střížovice (213)
- Sušno (101)

Kojovice forms an exclave of the municipal territory.

== Etymology ==
Vrutice was a Czech dialectical word for 'water', 'stream'. The village was renamed from Vrutice to Kropáčova Vrutice in the 17th century, after the then-owners of the village.

== Geography ==
Kropáčova Vrutice is located about 16 kilometres (10 mi) southwest of Mladá Boleslav and 28 km (17 mi) northeast of Prague. It lies in the Jizera Table. The highest point, located in the Kojovice exclave, is at 277 m (909 ft) above sea level. The stream Košátecký potok flows through the municipality.

== History ==
The first written mention of Vrutice is from 1385. The Kropáč family owned the village from c. 1620 to 1710.

== Demographics ==
Historical population

Year	Pop.	±%
1869	1,676	—
1880	2,004	+19.6%
1890	1,896	−5.4%
1900	1,993	+5.1%
1910	2,083	+4.5%

Year	Pop.	±%
1921	2,011	−3.5%
1930	1,924	−4.3%
1950	1,382	−28.2%
1961	1,285	−7.0%
1970	1,072	−16.6%

Year	Pop.	±%
1980	863	−19.5%
1991	724	−16.1%
2001	739	+2.1%
2011	843	+14.1%
2021	943	+11.9%

Source: Censuses

== Transport ==
The I/16 road, which connects the D10 motorway with Mělník, runs through the municipality.

Kropáčova Vrutice is located on the railway line Prague–Turnov.

== Sights ==
The main landmark of the municipality is the Church of the Beheading of Saint John the Baptist in Krpy. It is a Gothic church from the 14th century, which was modified in the Baroque style and then in 1900 in the Purist style.

== Notable people ==
- Miroslav Tyrš (1832–1884), sports organiser, co-founder of Sokol; grew up here
- Josef Kořenský (1847–1938), traveller, educator and writer
