= Velké Všelisy =

- Municipality
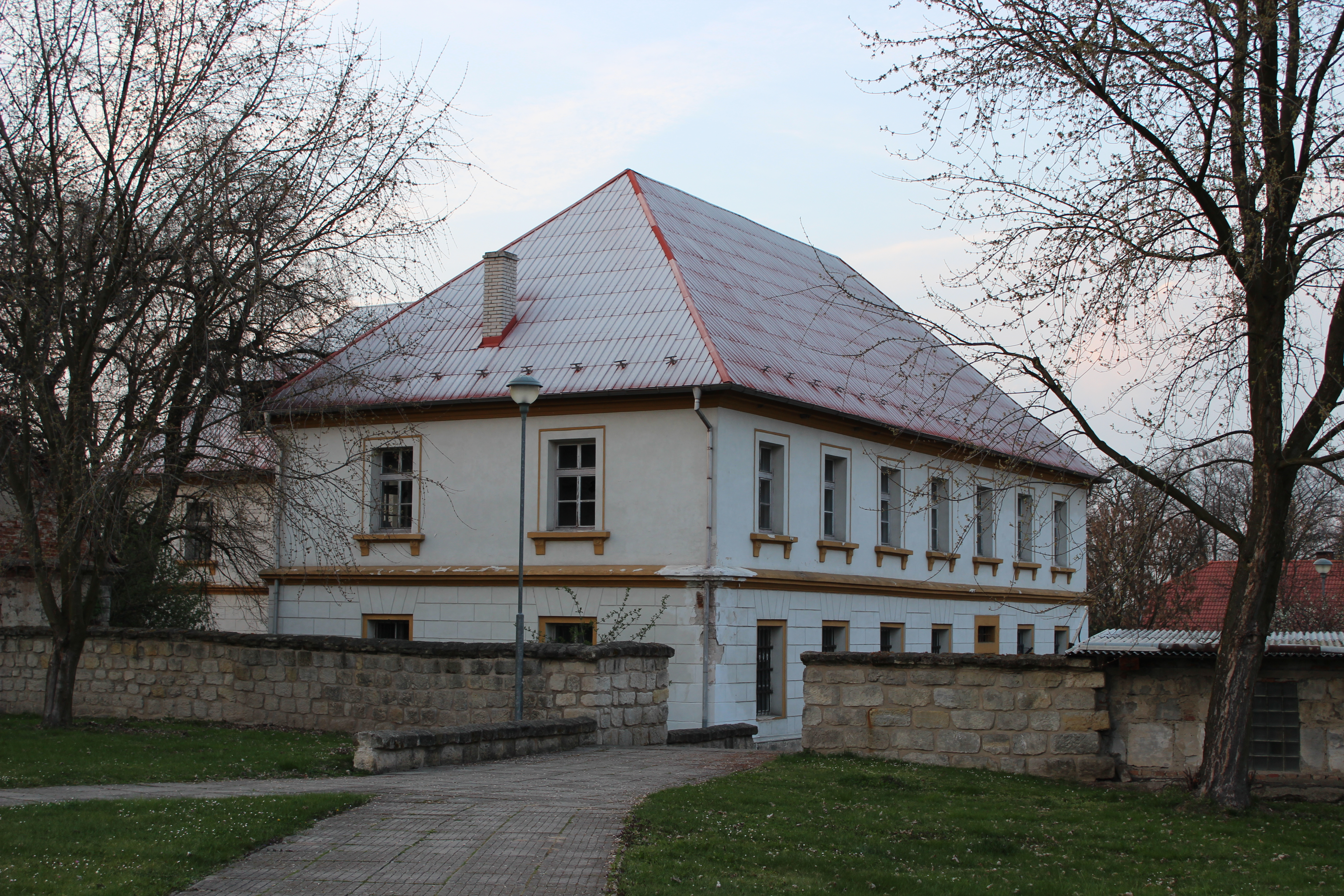
- Velké Všelisy Castle

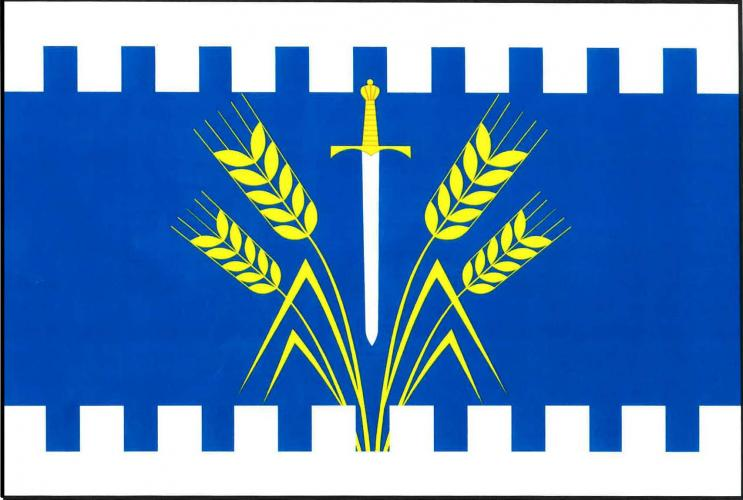
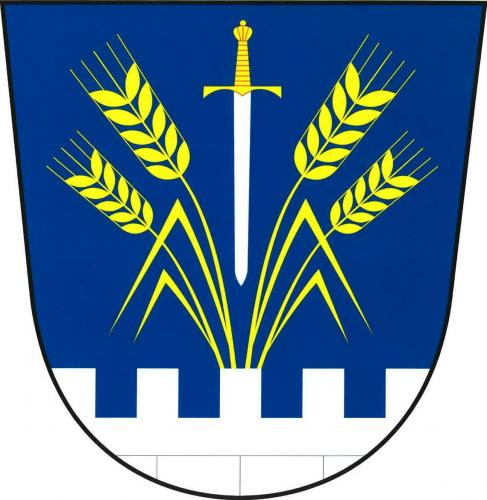
- Flag Coat of arms

- Location in the Czech Republic
- Coordinates: 50°22′45″N 14°44′43″E
- Country: Czech Republic
- Region: Central Bohemian
- District: Mladá Boleslav
- First mentioned: 1180

Area
  - Total: 14.47 km^{2} (5.59 sq mi)
- Elevation: 282 m (925 ft)

Population (2026-01-01)
  - Total: 409
  - Density: 28.3/km^{2} (73.2/sq mi)
- Time zone: UTC+1 (CET)
  - Summer (DST): UTC+2 (CEST)
- Postal codes: 294 26, 294 27
- Website: www.velkevselisy.cz

Velké Všelisy is a municipality and village in Mladá Boleslav District in the Central Bohemian Region of the Czech Republic. It has about 400 inhabitants.

== Administrative division ==
Velké Všelisy consists of four municipal parts (in brackets population according to the 2021 census):

- Velké Všelisy (198)
- Krušiny (8)
- Malé Všelisy (74)
- Zamachy (110)

== Demographics ==
Historical population
Year	Pop.	±%
1869	846	—
1880	961	+13.6%
1890	986	+2.6%
1900	1,075	+9.0%
1910	1,063	−1.1%
1921	1,032	−2.9%
1930	1,007	−2.4%
1950	621	−38.3%
1961	697	+12.2%
1970	625	−10.3%
1980	462	−26.1%
1991	382	−17.3%
2001	349	−8.6%
2011	346	−0.9%
2021	390	+12.7%
Source: Censuses
