= Kozmice =

Kozmice may refer to places in the Czech Republic:

- Kozmice (Benešov District), a municipality and village in the Central Bohemian Region
- Kozmice (Opava District), a municipality and village in the Moravian-Silesian Region
- Kozmice, a village and part of Radenín in the South Bohemian Region
- Kozmice, a village and part of Strážiště in the Central Bohemian Region
