= Chudíř =

- Municipality
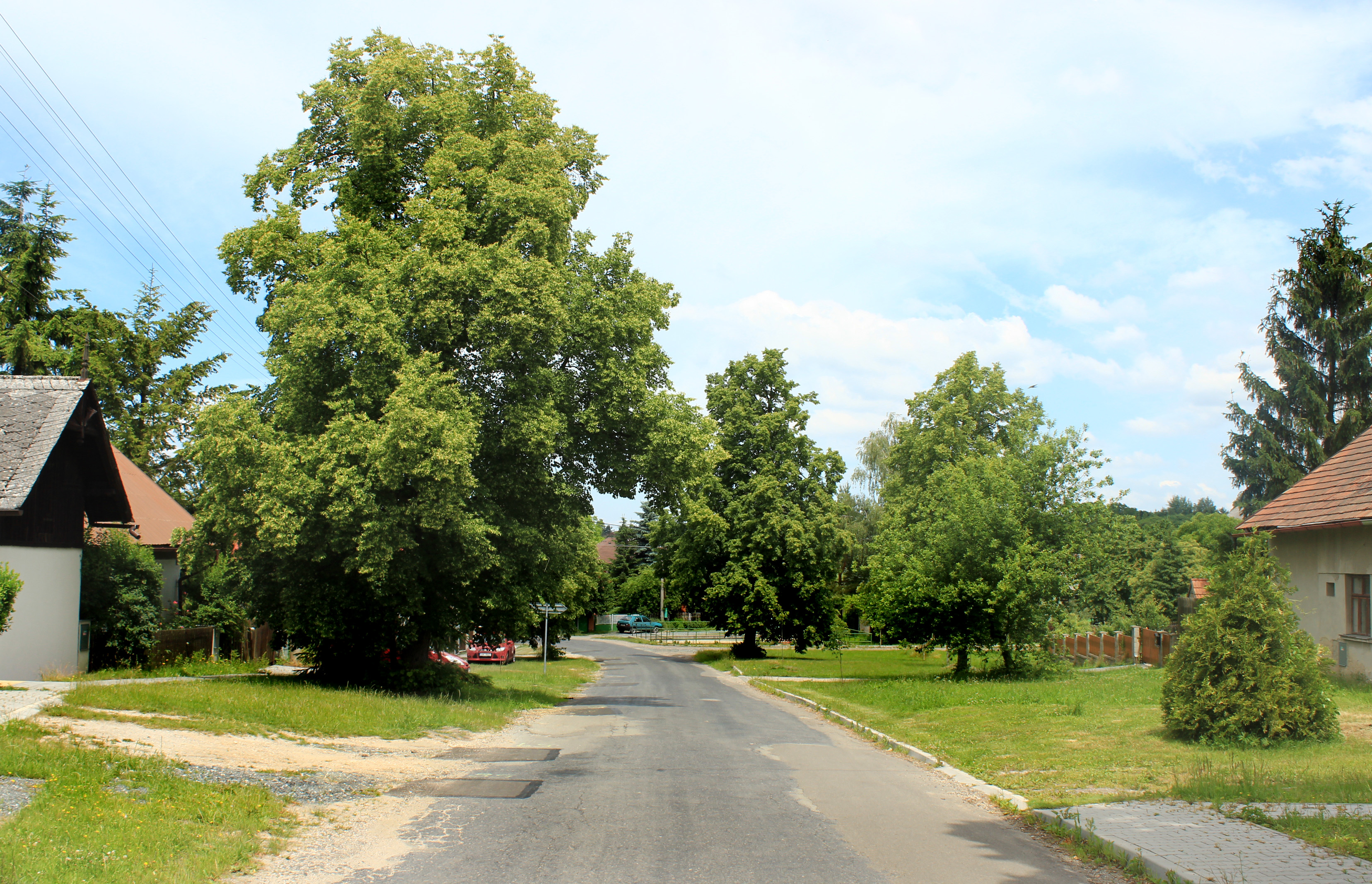
- Main street

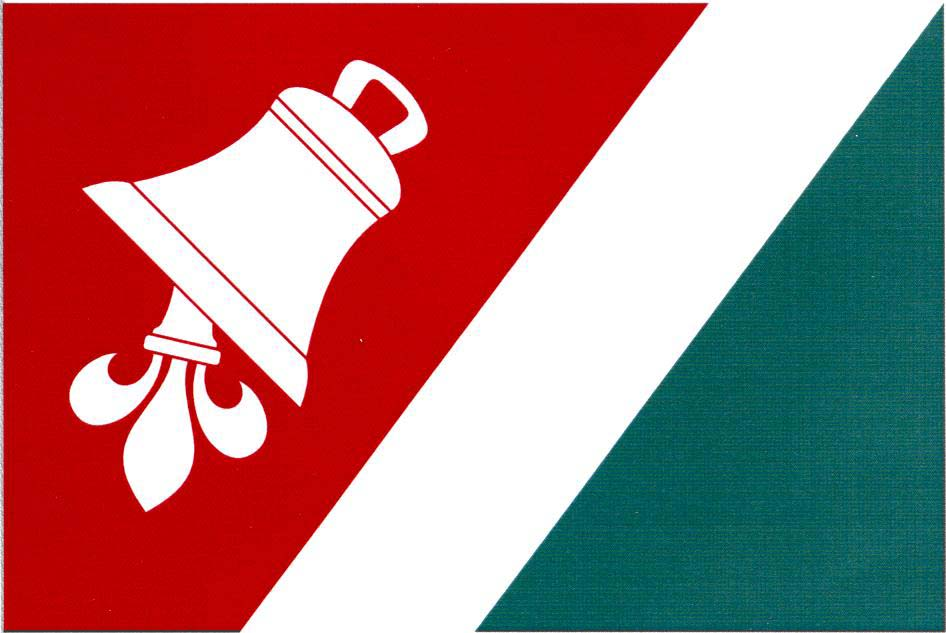
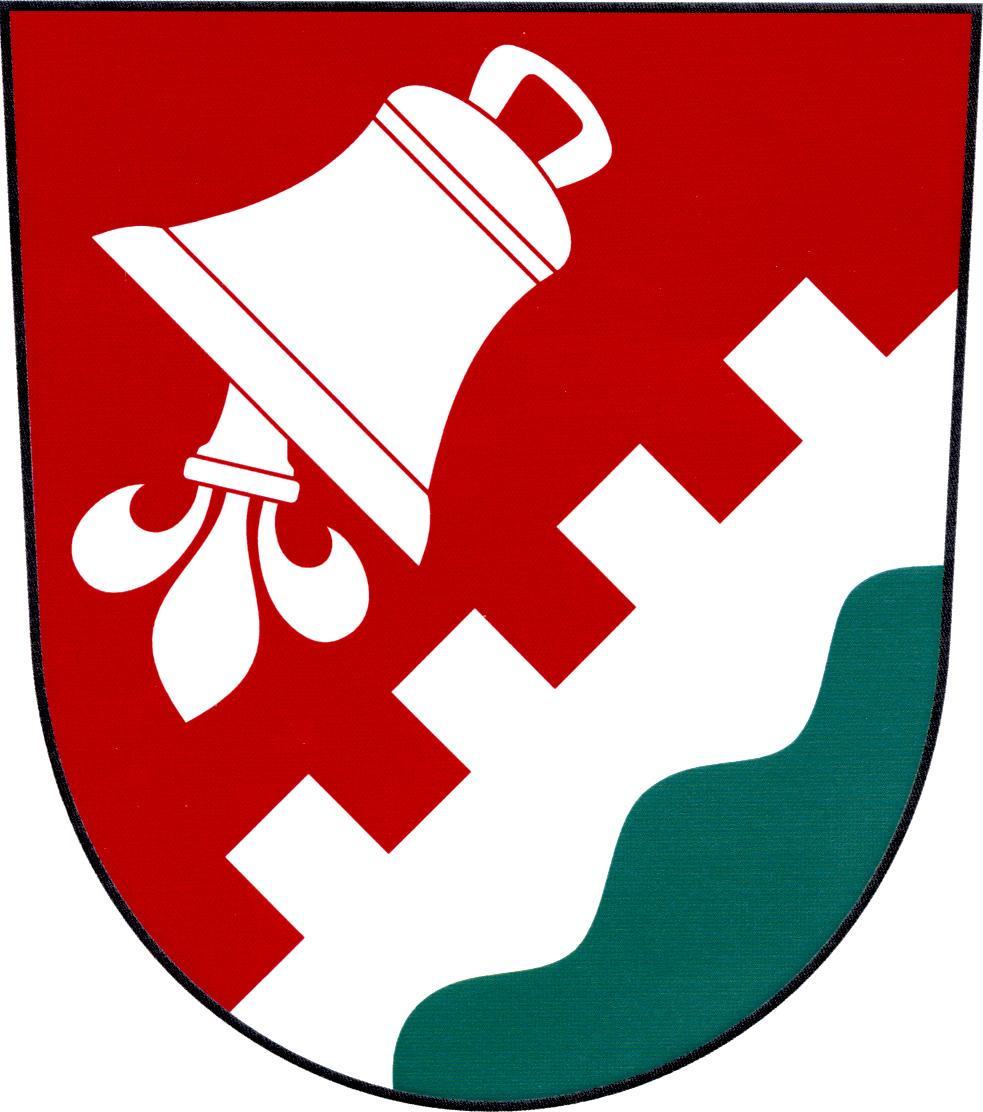
- Flag Coat of arms

- Location in the Czech Republic
- Coordinates: 50°18′32″N 15°0′50″E
- Country: Czech Republic
- Region: Central Bohemian
- District: Mladá Boleslav
- First mentioned: 1318

Area
  - Total: 3.12 km^{2} (1.20 sq mi)
- Elevation: 240 m (790 ft)

Population (2026-01-01)
  - Total: 244
  - Density: 78.2/km^{2} (203/sq mi)
- Time zone: UTC+1 (CET)
  - Summer (DST): UTC+2 (CEST)
- Postal code: 294 45
- Website: www.chudir.e-obec.cz

Chudíř is a municipality and village in Mladá Boleslav District in the Central Bohemian Region of the Czech Republic. It has about 200 inhabitants.

== Demographics ==
Historical population
Year	Pop.	±%
1869	252	—
1880	266	+5.6%
1890	273	+2.6%
1900	255	−6.6%
1910	255	+0.0%
1921	274	+7.5%
1930	283	+3.3%
1950	232	−18.0%
1961	256	+10.3%
1970	213	−16.8%
1980	160	−24.9%
1991	144	−10.0%
2001	147	+2.1%
2011	178	+21.1%
2021	218	+22.5%
Source: Censuses
