= Rohatsko =

- Municipality
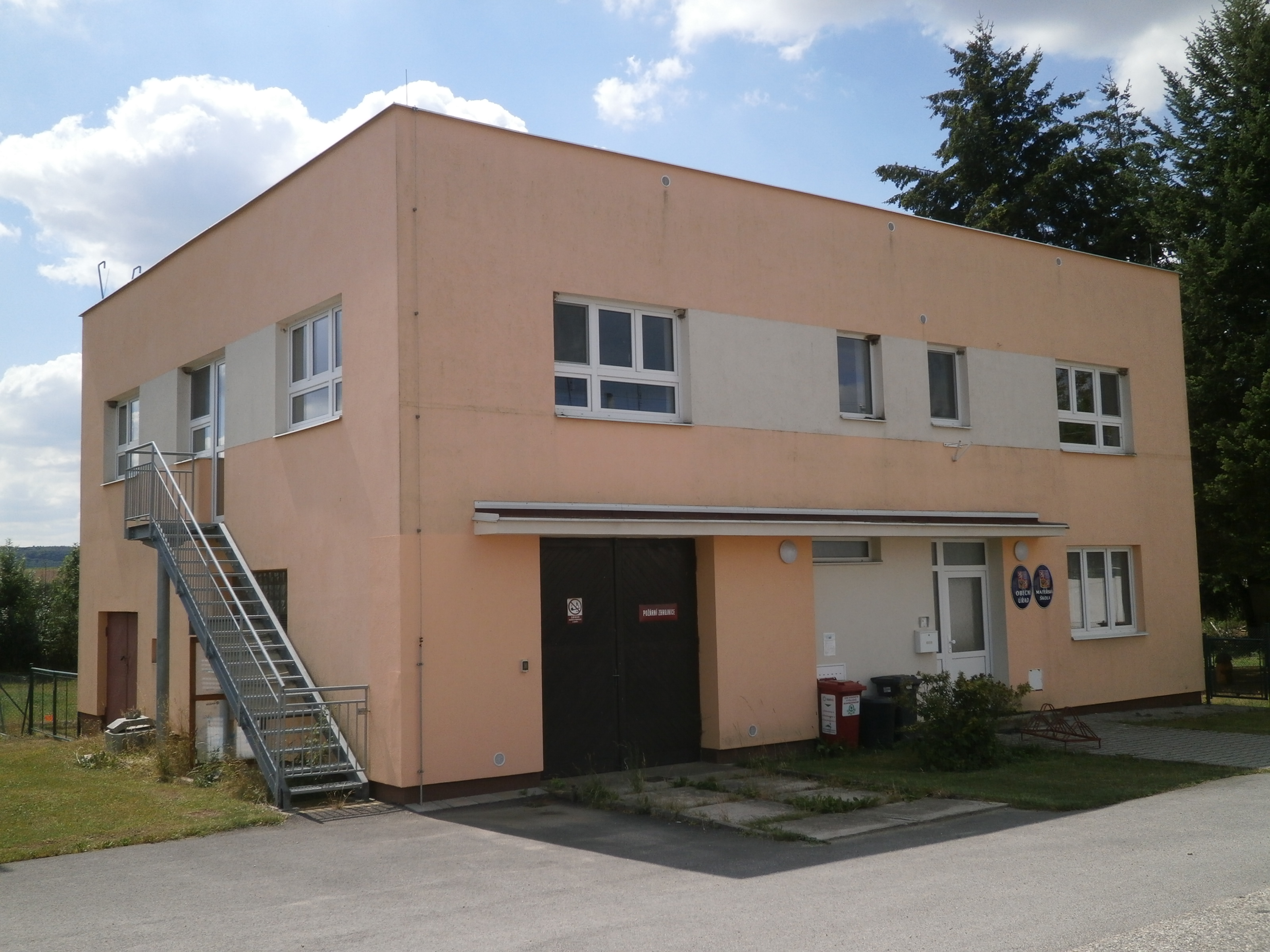
- Municipal office

- Location in the Czech Republic
- Coordinates: 50°26′25″N 15°6′17″E
- Country: Czech Republic
- Region: Central Bohemian
- District: Mladá Boleslav
- First mentioned: 1542

Area
  - Total: 1.92 km^{2} (0.74 sq mi)
- Elevation: 231 m (758 ft)

Population (2026-01-01)
  - Total: 273
  - Density: 142/km^{2} (368/sq mi)
- Time zone: UTC+1 (CET)
  - Summer (DST): UTC+2 (CEST)
- Postal code: 294 04
- Website: www.rohatsko.cz

Rohatsko is a municipality and village in Mladá Boleslav District in the Central Bohemian Region of the Czech Republic. It has about 300 inhabitants.

== Demographics ==
Historical population
Year	Pop.	±%
1869	251	—
1880	249	−0.8%
1890	250	+0.4%
1900	235	−6.0%
1910	262	+11.5%
1921	262	+0.0%
1930	247	−5.7%
1950	206	−16.6%
1961	206	+0.0%
1970	190	−7.8%
1980	170	−10.5%
1991	143	−15.9%
2001	139	−2.8%
2011	215	+54.7%
2021	259	+20.5%
Source: Censuses
