= Bílá Hlína =

- Municipality
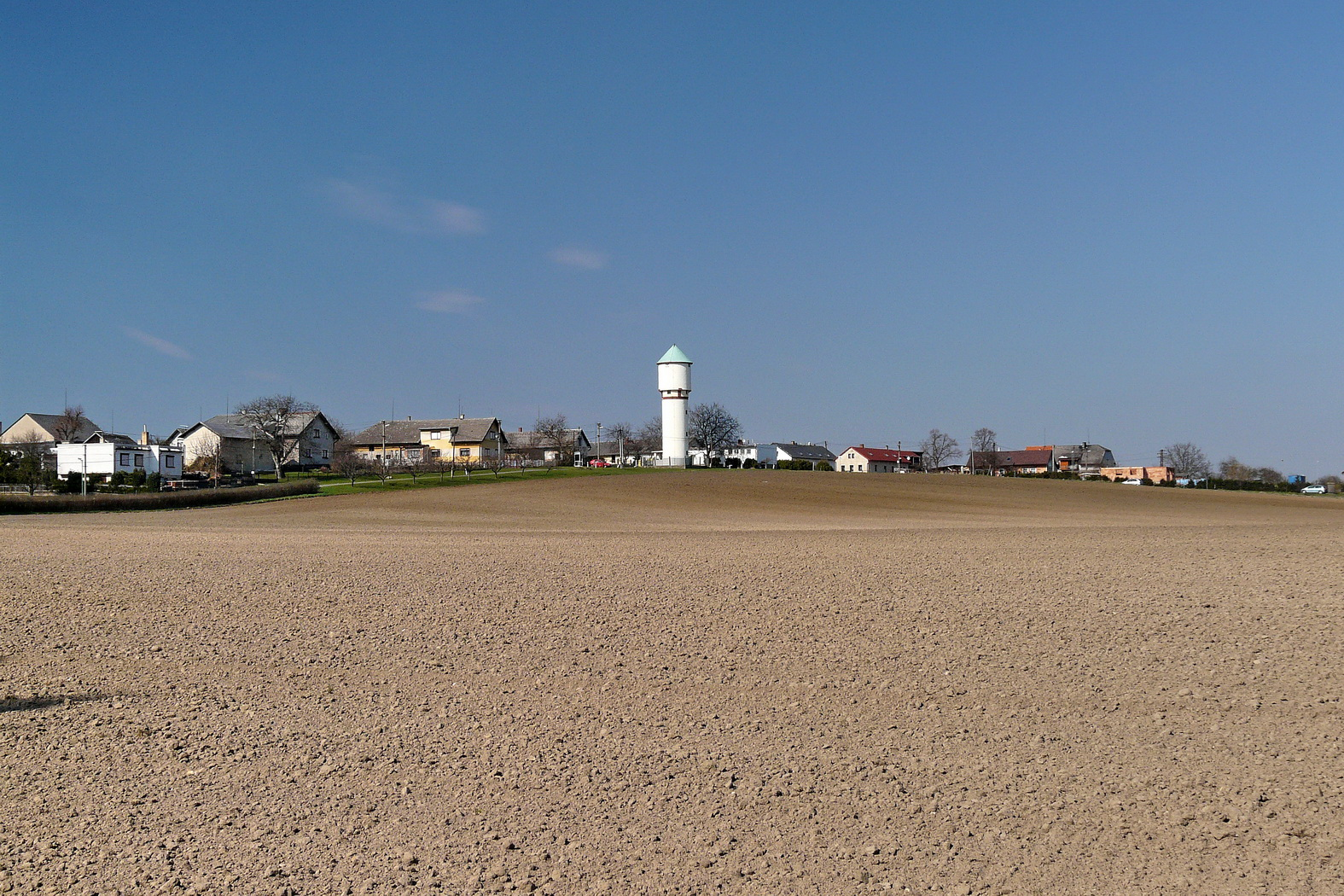
- Fields in front of Bílá Hlína

- Location in the Czech Republic
- Coordinates: 50°31′57″N 14°55′31″E
- Country: Czech Republic
- Region: Central Bohemian
- District: Mladá Boleslav
- Founded: 1712

Area
  - Total: 8.57 km^{2} (3.31 sq mi)
- Elevation: 278 m (912 ft)

Population (2026-01-01)
  - Total: 127
  - Density: 14.8/km^{2} (38.4/sq mi)
- Time zone: UTC+1 (CET)
  - Summer (DST): UTC+2 (CEST)
- Postal code: 295 01
- Website: www.bilahlina.cz

Bílá Hlína is a municipality and village in Mladá Boleslav District in the Central Bohemian Region of the Czech Republic. It has about 100 inhabitants.

== Etymology ==
The name means 'white clay' in Czech and is derived from the white clay soil where the village was founded.

== Geography ==
Bílá Hlína is located about 12 kilometres (7 mi) west of Mladá Boleslav and 55 km (34 mi) northeast of Prague. It lies in the Jizera Table. Most of the municipal territory is formed by the Klokočka deer park.

== History ==
Bílá Hlína was founded in 1712 and belongs to the youngest villages in the region.

== Demographics ==
Historical population

Year	Pop.	±%
1869	250	—
1880	249	−0.4%
1890	258	+3.6%
1900	244	−5.4%
1910	204	−16.4%

Year	Pop.	±%
1921	218	+6.9%
1930	221	+1.4%
1950	150	−32.1%
1961	144	−4.0%
1970	149	+3.5%

Year	Pop.	±%
1980	137	−8.1%
1991	100	−27.0%
2001	99	−1.0%
2011	103	+4.0%
2021	120	+16.5%

Source: Censuses

== Transport ==
There are no railways or major roads passing through the municipality.

== Sights ==
There are no protected cultural monuments in the municipality.
