= Neveklovice =

- Municipality
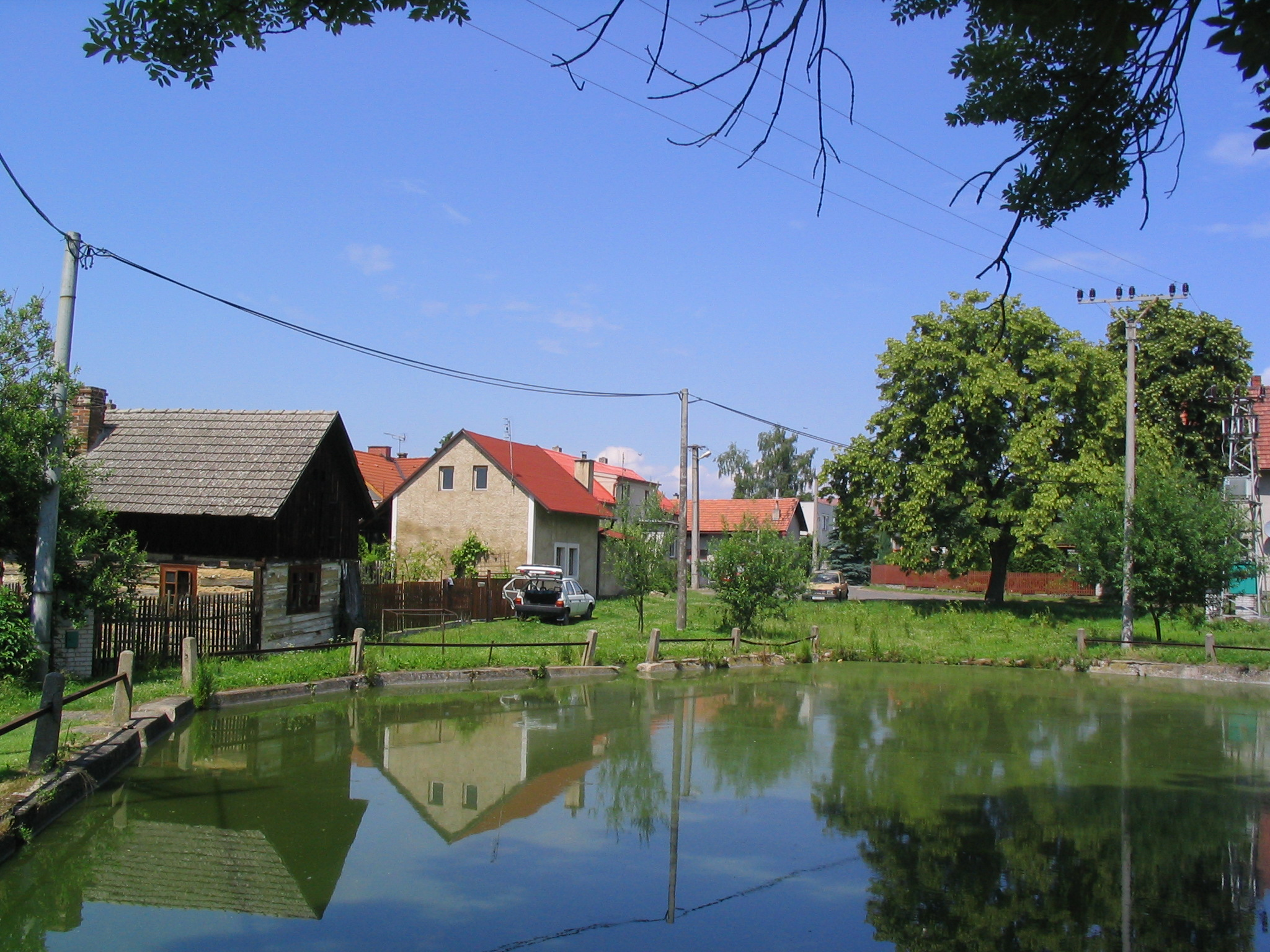
- A pond in Neveklovice

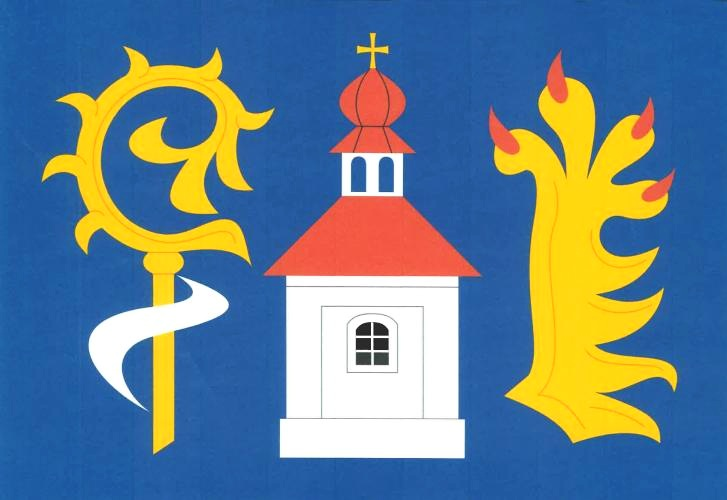
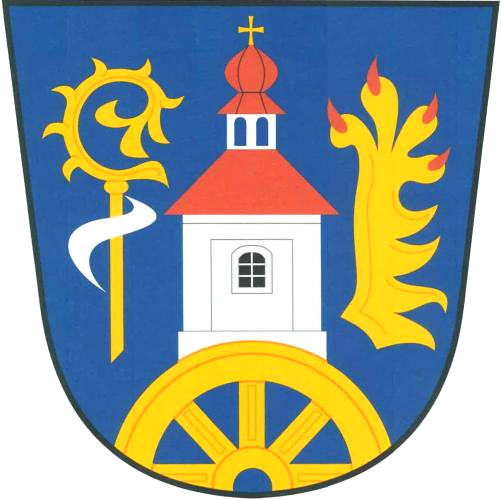
- Flag Coat of arms

- Location in the Czech Republic
- Coordinates: 50°34′13″N 14°56′54″E
- Country: Czech Republic
- Region: Central Bohemian
- District: Mladá Boleslav
- First mentioned: 1400

Area
  - Total: 3.51 km^{2} (1.36 sq mi)
- Elevation: 308 m (1,010 ft)

Population (2026-01-01)
  - Total: 78
  - Density: 22/km^{2} (58/sq mi)
- Time zone: UTC+1 (CET)
  - Summer (DST): UTC+2 (CEST)
- Postal code: 294 13
- Website: www.obec-neveklovice.cz

Neveklovice is a municipality and village in Mladá Boleslav District in the Central Bohemian Region of the Czech Republic. It has about 80 inhabitants.

== Demographics ==
Historical population
Year	Pop.	±%
1869	255	—
1880	228	−10.6%
1890	231	+1.3%
1900	188	−18.6%
1910	201	+6.9%
1921	177	−11.9%
1930	172	−2.8%
1950	126	−26.7%
1961	95	−24.6%
1970	66	−30.5%
1980	40	−39.4%
1991	27	−32.5%
2001	33	+22.2%
2011	62	+87.9%
2021	70	+12.9%
Source: Censuses
