= Horní Slivno =

- Municipality
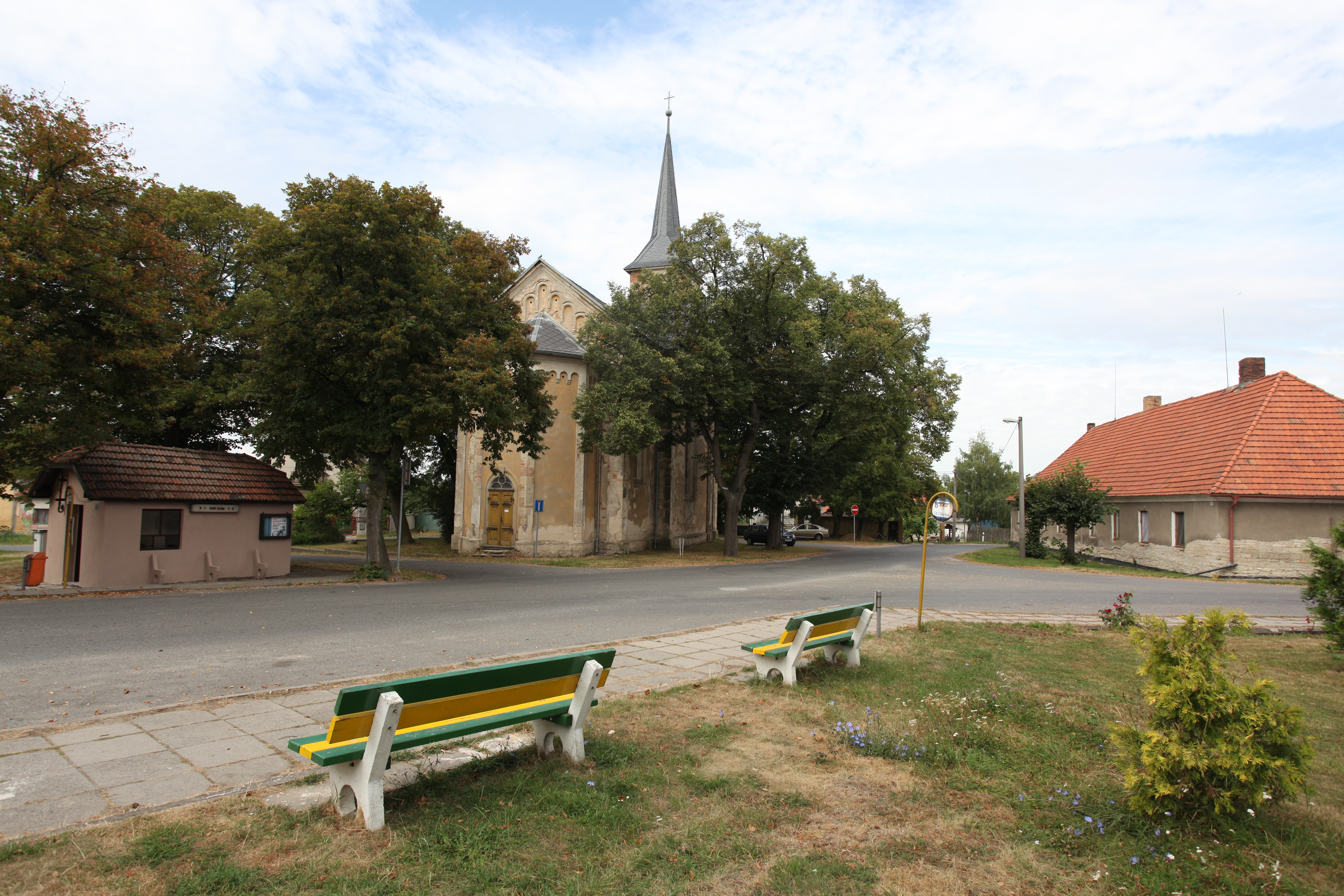
- Centre of Horní Slivno

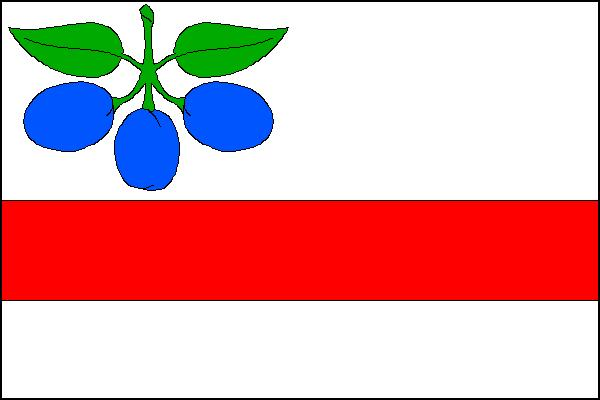
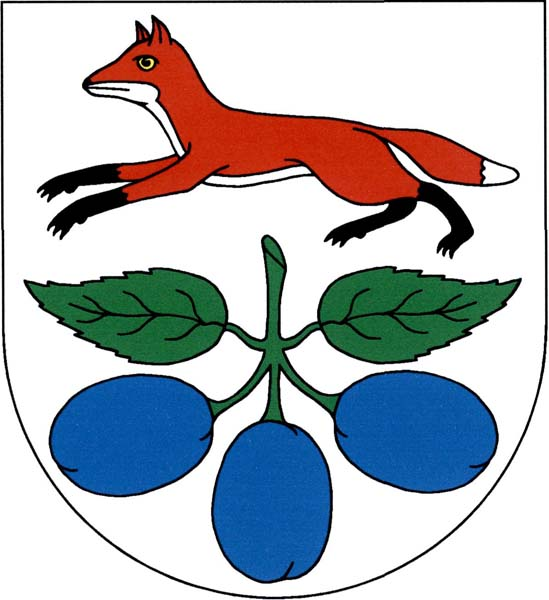
- Flag Coat of arms

- Location in the Czech Republic
- Coordinates: 50°18′15″N 14°42′18″E
- Country: Czech Republic
- Region: Central Bohemian
- District: Mladá Boleslav
- First mentioned: 1223

Area
  - Total: 6.67 km^{2} (2.58 sq mi)
- Elevation: 197 m (646 ft)

Population (2026-01-01)
  - Total: 395
  - Density: 59.2/km^{2} (153/sq mi)
- Time zone: UTC+1 (CET)
  - Summer (DST): UTC+2 (CEST)
- Postal code: 294 79
- Website: www.hornislivno.cz

Horní Slivno is a municipality and village in Mladá Boleslav District in the Central Bohemian Region of the Czech Republic. It has about 400 inhabitants.

== Demographics ==
Historical population
Year	Pop.	±%
1869	489	—
1880	523	+7.0%
1890	468	−10.5%
1900	462	−1.3%
1910	490	+6.1%
1921	512	+4.5%
1930	472	−7.8%
1950	286	−39.4%
1961	301	+5.2%
1970	291	−3.3%
1980	251	−13.7%
1991	221	−12.0%
2001	218	−1.4%
2011	220	+0.9%
2021	329	+49.5%
Source: Censuses
