= Rokytovec =

- Municipality
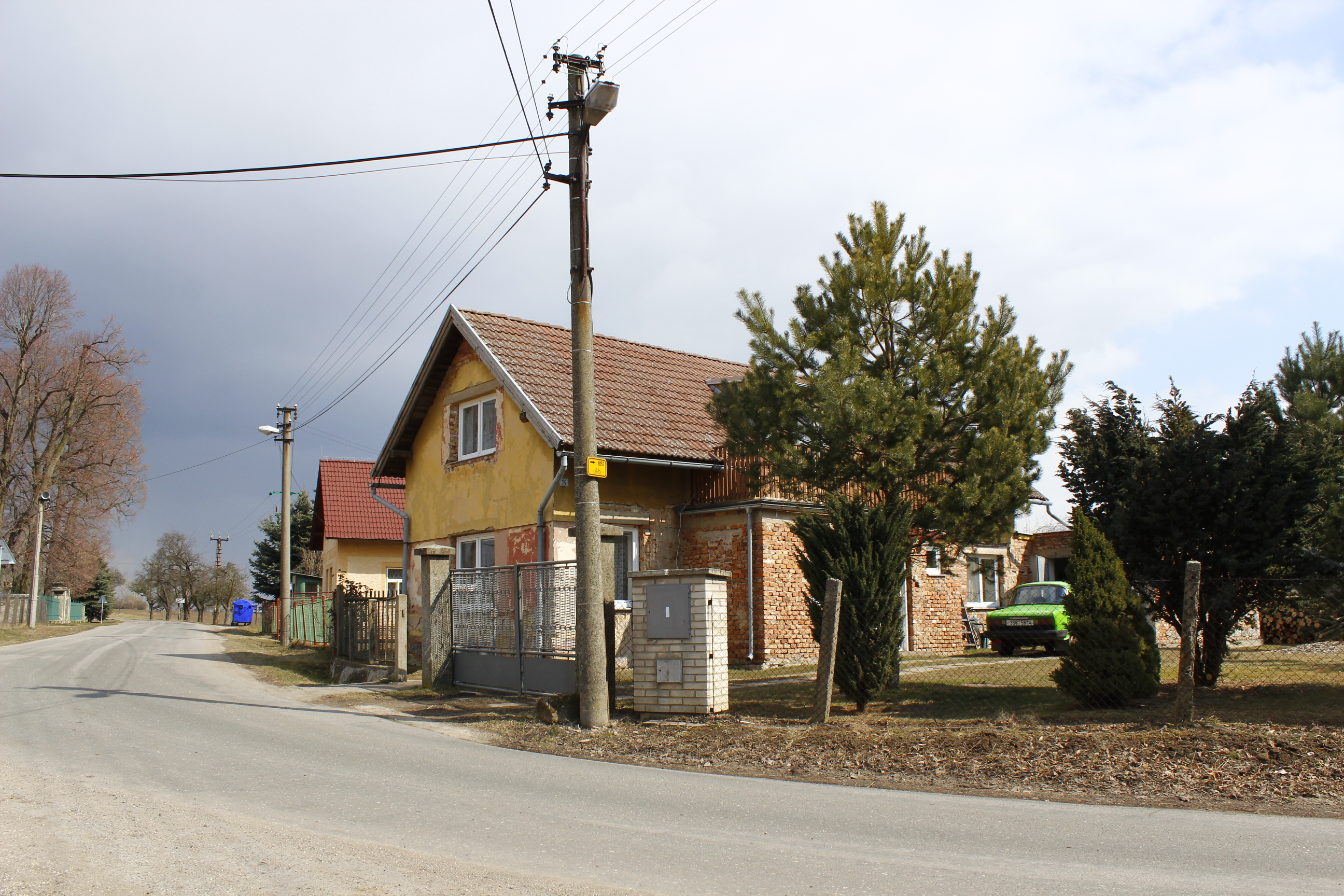
- Malé Horky, a part of Rokytovec

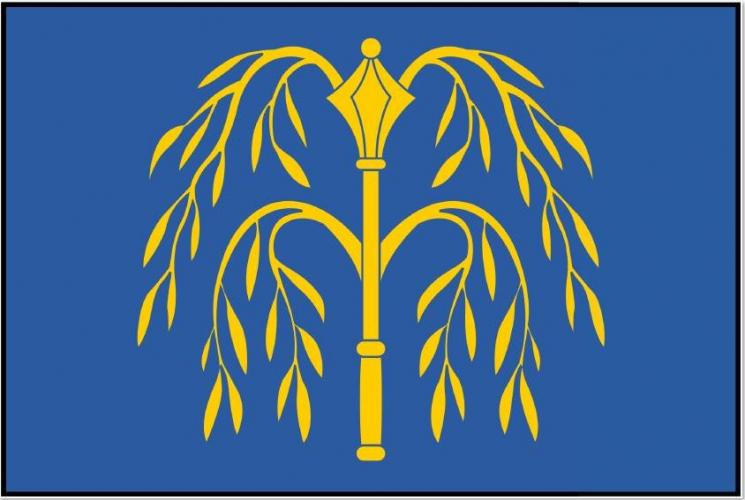
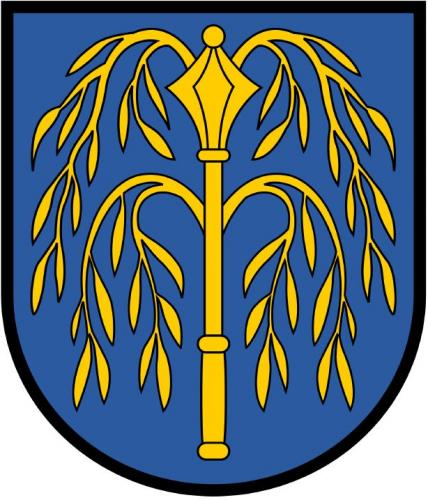
- Flag Coat of arms

- Location in the Czech Republic
- Coordinates: 50°24′24″N 14°49′51″E
- Country: Czech Republic
- Region: Central Bohemian
- District: Mladá Boleslav
- First mentioned: 1322

Area
  - Total: 5.35 km^{2} (2.07 sq mi)
- Elevation: 290 m (950 ft)

Population (2026-01-01)
  - Total: 181
  - Density: 33.8/km^{2} (87.6/sq mi)
- Time zone: UTC+1 (CET)
  - Summer (DST): UTC+2 (CEST)
- Postal code: 294 30
- Website: www.rokytovec.cz

Rokytovec is a municipality and village in Mladá Boleslav District in the Central Bohemian Region of the Czech Republic. It has about 200 inhabitants.

== Administrative division ==
Rokytovec consists of two municipal parts (in brackets population according to the 2021 census):

- Rokytovec (139)
- Malé Horky (14)

== Demographics ==
Historical population
Year	Pop.	±%
1869	310	—
1880	333	+7.4%
1890	345	+3.6%
1900	354	+2.6%
1910	326	−7.9%
1921	350	+7.4%
1930	317	−9.4%
1950	220	−30.6%
1961	180	−18.2%
1970	166	−7.8%
1980	144	−13.3%
1991	120	−16.7%
2001	124	+3.3%
2011	152	+22.6%
2021	153	+0.7%
Source: Censuses
