= Koryta (Mladá Boleslav District) =

- Municipality
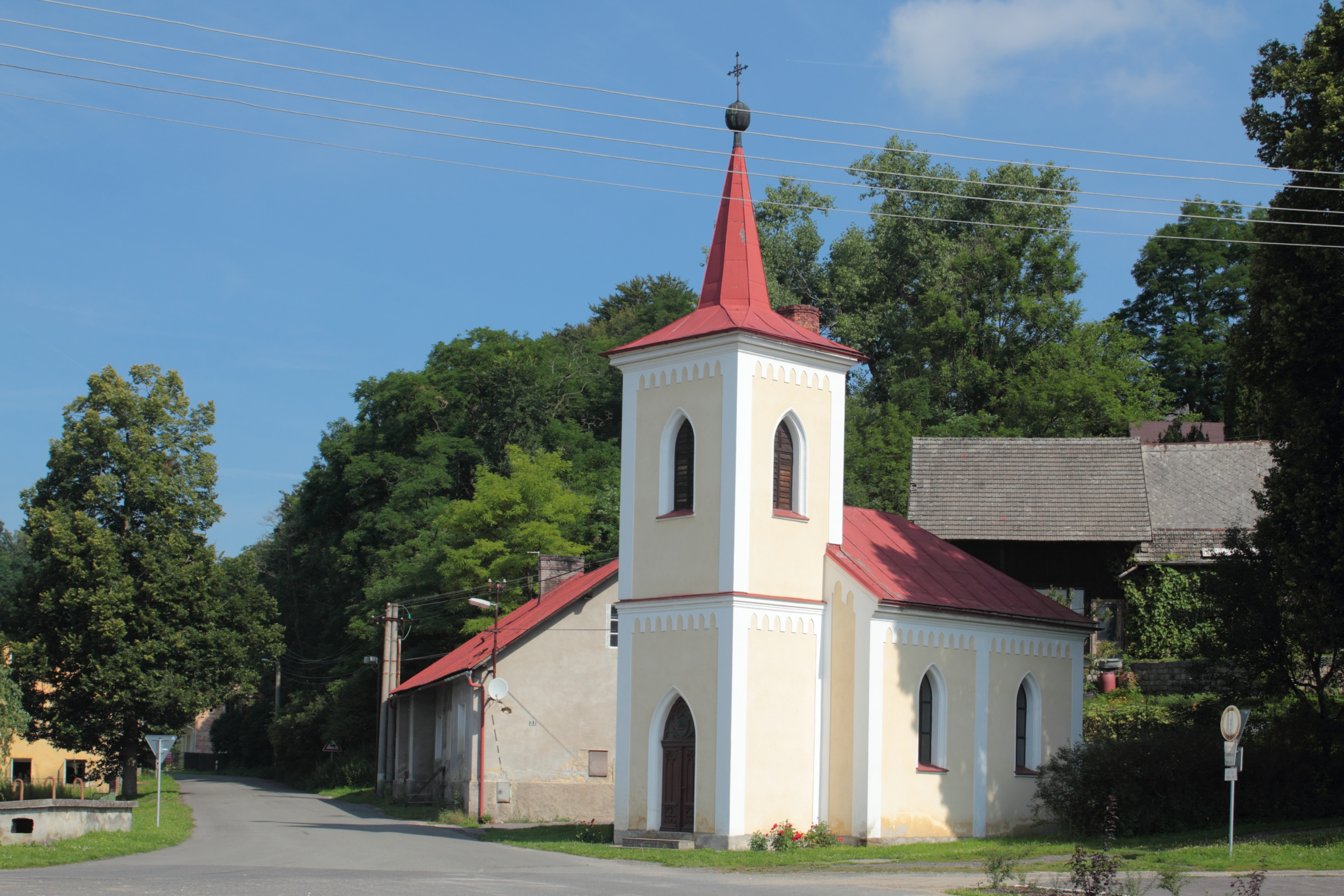
- Chapel of the Seven Maccabean Brothers

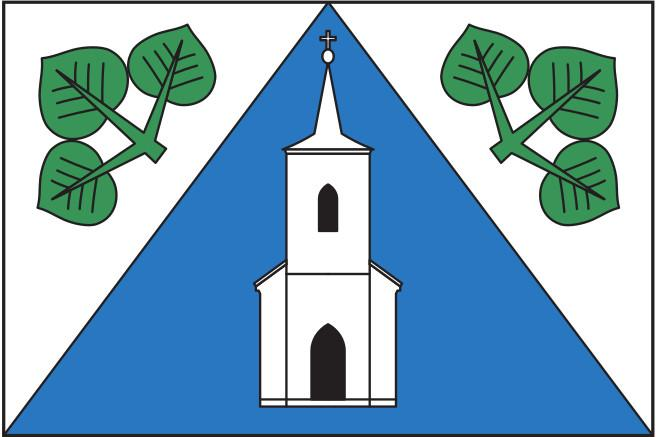
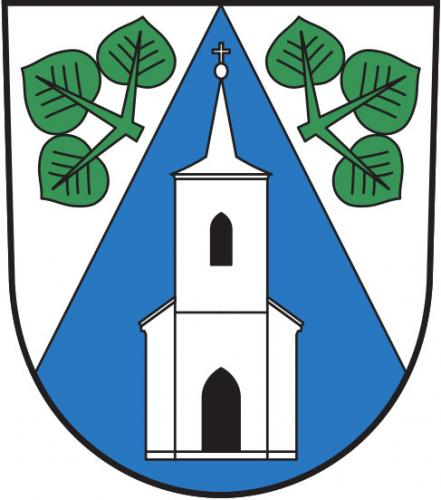
- Flag Coat of arms

- Location in the Czech Republic
- Coordinates: 50°34′19″N 15°0′43″E
- Country: Czech Republic
- Region: Central Bohemian
- District: Mladá Boleslav
- First mentioned: 1225

Area
  - Total: 1.66 km^{2} (0.64 sq mi)
- Elevation: 235 m (771 ft)

Population (2026-01-01)
  - Total: 109
  - Density: 65.7/km^{2} (170/sq mi)
- Time zone: UTC+1 (CET)
  - Summer (DST): UTC+2 (CEST)
- Postal code: 294 11
- Website: www.obeckoryta.eud.cz

Koryta is a municipality and village in Mladá Boleslav District in the Central Bohemian Region of the Czech Republic. It has about 100 inhabitants.

== Demographics ==
Historical population
Year	Pop.	±%
1869	241	—
1880	252	+4.6%
1890	246	−2.4%
1900	242	−1.6%
1910	197	−18.6%
1921	195	−1.0%
1930	186	−4.6%
1950	136	−26.9%
1961	137	+0.7%
1970	116	−15.3%
1980	90	−22.4%
1991	67	−25.6%
2001	65	−3.0%
2011	88	+35.4%
2021	77	−12.5%
Source: Censuses
