= Dolní Stakory =

- Municipality
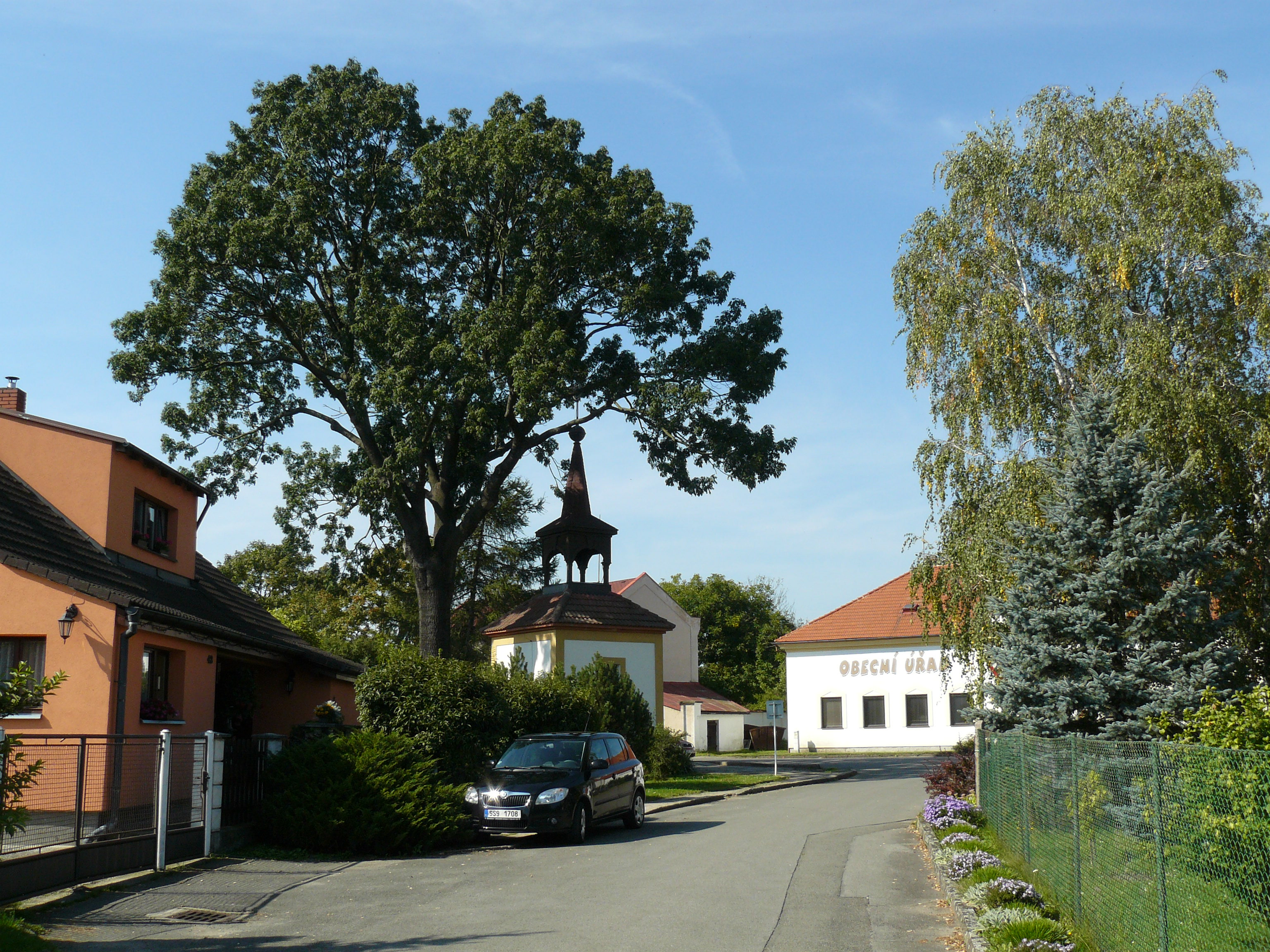
- Centre of Dolní Stakory

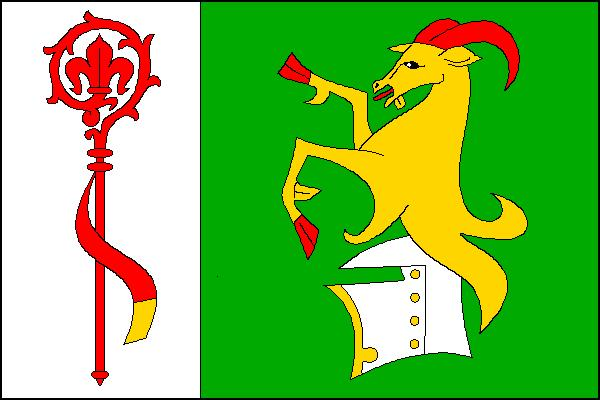
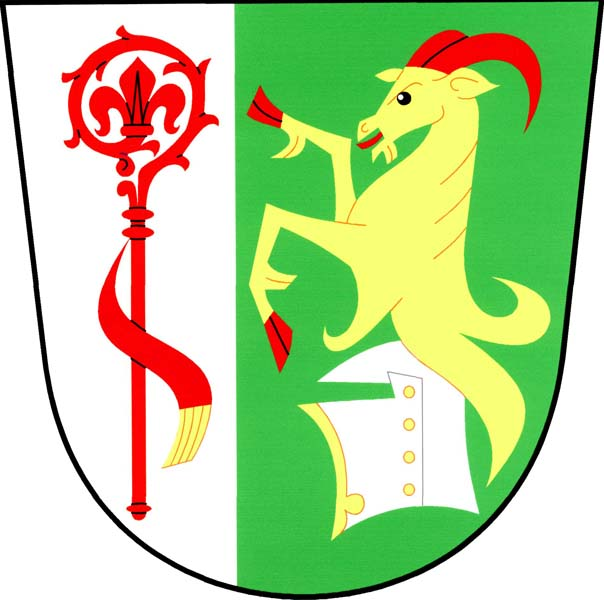
- Flag Coat of arms

- Location in the Czech Republic
- Coordinates: 50°26′14″N 14°58′21″E
- Country: Czech Republic
- Region: Central Bohemian
- District: Mladá Boleslav
- First mentioned: 1325

Area
  - Total: 3.86 km^{2} (1.49 sq mi)
- Elevation: 234 m (768 ft)

Population (2026-01-01)
  - Total: 324
  - Density: 83.9/km^{2} (217/sq mi)
- Time zone: UTC+1 (CET)
  - Summer (DST): UTC+2 (CEST)
- Postal code: 293 01
- Website: www.dolnistakory.cz

Dolní Stakory is a municipality and village in Mladá Boleslav District in the Central Bohemian Region of the Czech Republic. It has about 300 inhabitants.

== Demographics ==
Historical population
Year	Pop.	±%
1869	230	—
1880	240	+4.3%
1890	250	+4.2%
1900	252	+0.8%
1910	235	−6.7%
1921	234	−0.4%
1930	224	−4.3%
1950	169	−24.6%
1961	138	−18.3%
1970	122	−11.6%
1980	143	+17.2%
1991	147	+2.8%
2001	186	+26.5%
2011	270	+45.2%
2021	350	+29.6%
Source: Censuses
