= Ctiměřice =

- Municipality
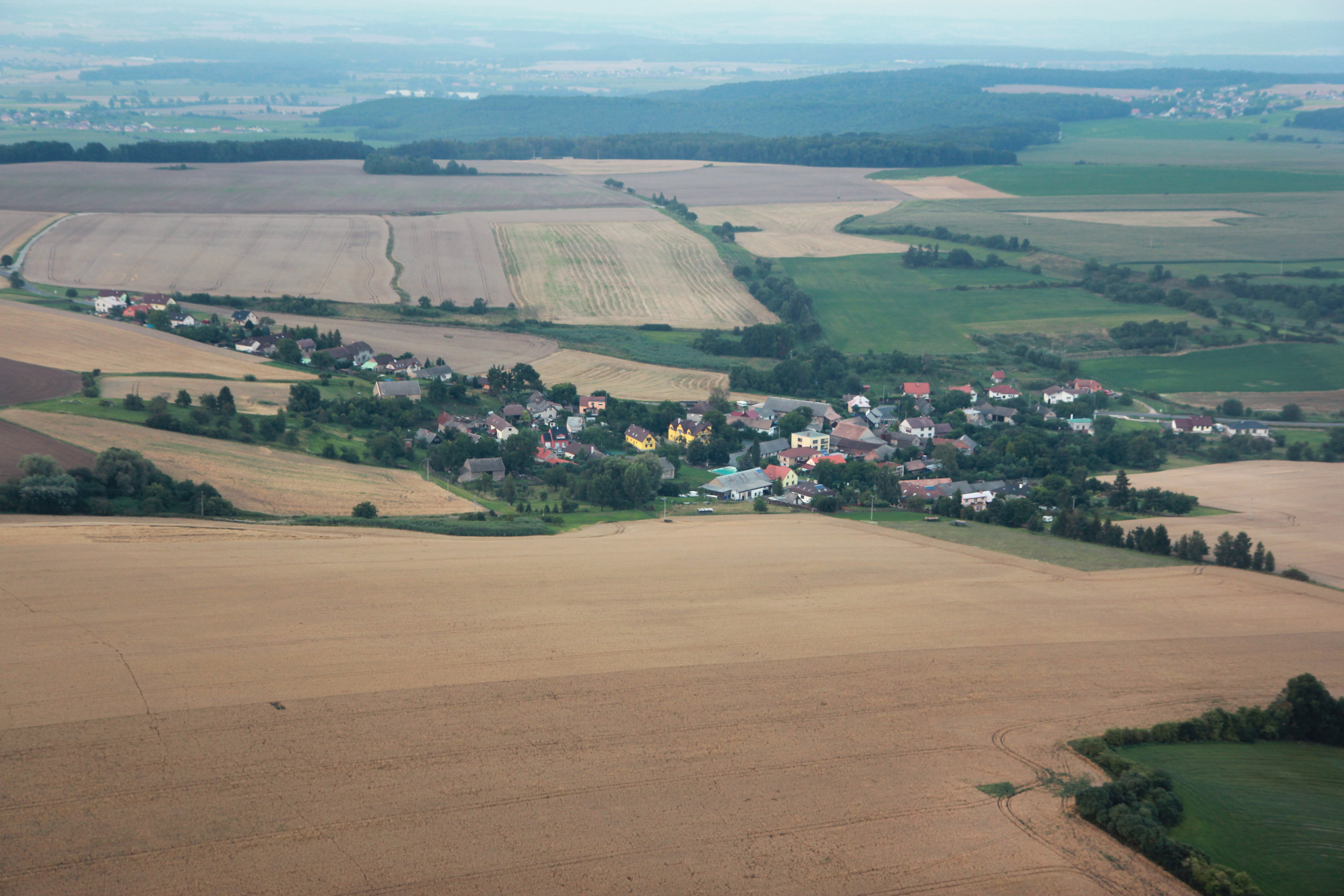
- Aerial view from the south

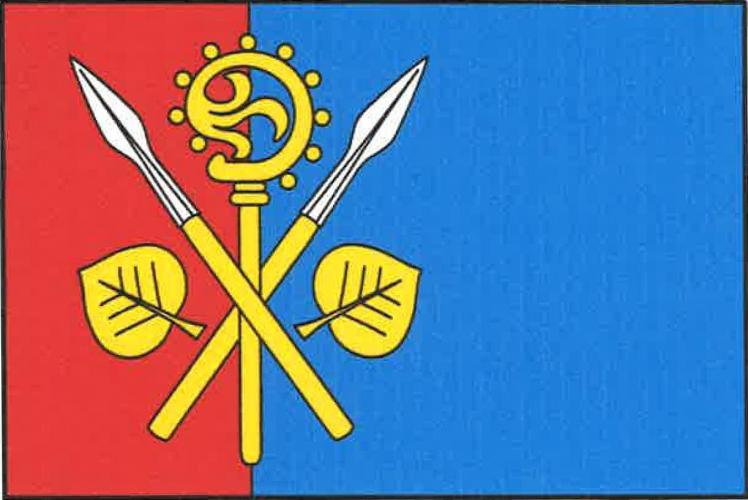
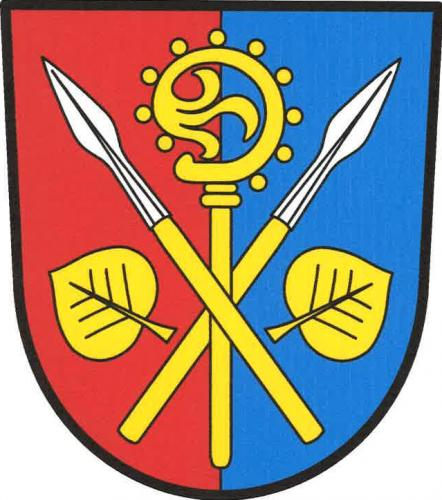
- Flag Coat of arms

- Location in the Czech Republic
- Coordinates: 50°22′40″N 14°59′36″E
- Country: Czech Republic
- Region: Central Bohemian
- District: Mladá Boleslav
- First mentioned: 1255

Area
  - Total: 1.66 km^{2} (0.64 sq mi)
- Elevation: 275 m (902 ft)

Population (2026-01-01)
  - Total: 143
  - Density: 86.1/km^{2} (223/sq mi)
- Time zone: UTC+1 (CET)
  - Summer (DST): UTC+2 (CEST)
- Postal code: 294 46
- Website: www.ctimerice.e-obec.cz

Ctiměřice is a municipality and village in Mladá Boleslav District in the Central Bohemian Region of the Czech Republic. It has about 100 inhabitants.

== Demographics ==
Historical population
Year	Pop.	±%
1869	152	—
1880	153	+0.7%
1890	153	+0.0%
1900	154	+0.7%
1910	194	+26.0%
1921	209	+7.7%
1930	179	−14.4%
1950	142	−20.7%
1961	131	−7.7%
1970	115	−12.2%
1980	92	−20.0%
1991	84	−8.7%
2001	93	+10.7%
2011	118	+26.9%
2021	147	+24.6%
Source: Censuses
