= Pětikozly =

- Municipality
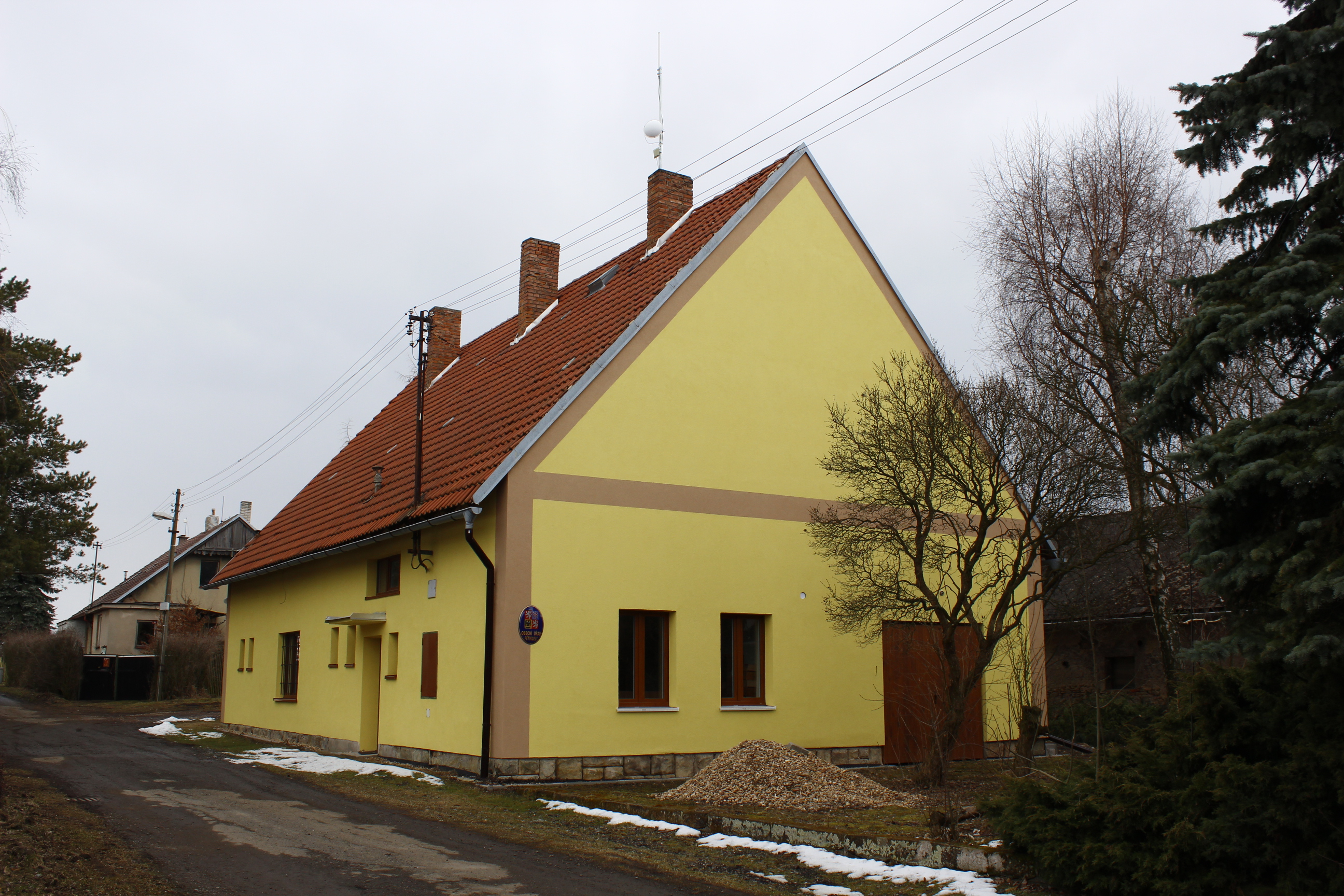
- Municipal office

- Location in the Czech Republic
- Coordinates: 50°24′41″N 14°48′43″E
- Country: Czech Republic
- Region: Central Bohemian
- District: Mladá Boleslav
- First mentioned: 1360

Area
  - Total: 3.04 km^{2} (1.17 sq mi)
- Elevation: 306 m (1,004 ft)

Population (2026-01-01)
  - Total: 92
  - Density: 30/km^{2} (78/sq mi)
- Time zone: UTC+1 (CET)
  - Summer (DST): UTC+2 (CEST)
- Postal code: 294 30
- Website: www.petikozly.cz

Pětikozly is a municipality and village in Mladá Boleslav District in the Central Bohemian Region of the Czech Republic. It has about 90 inhabitants.

== Demographics ==
Historical population
| Year | Pop. | ±% |
|---|---|---|
| 1869 | 166 | — |
| 1880 | 201 | +21.1% |
| 1890 | 255 | +26.9% |
| 1900 | 246 | −3.5% |
| 1910 | 247 | +0.4% |
| 1921 | 245 | −0.8% |
| 1930 | 216 | −11.8% |
| 1950 | 165 | −23.6% |
| 1961 | 179 | +8.5% |
| 1970 | 144 | −19.6% |
| 1980 | 94 | −34.7% |
| 1991 | 74 | −21.3% |
| 2001 | 75 | +1.4% |
| 2011 | 57 | −24.0% |
| 2021 | 87 | +52.6% |
Source: Censuses
