= Řitonice =

- Municipality
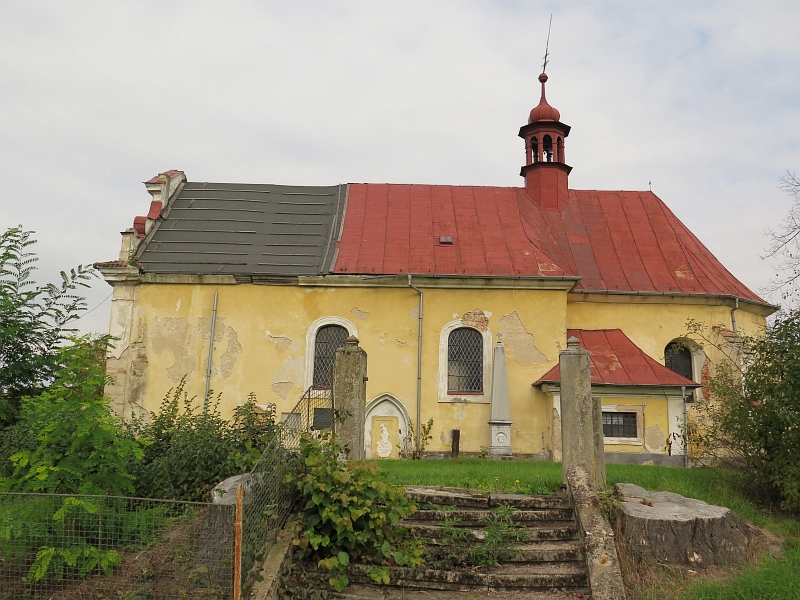
- Church of Saint Stephan

- Flag Coat of arms

- Location in the Czech Republic
- Coordinates: 50°24′30″N 15°6′29″E
- Country: Czech Republic
- Region: Central Bohemian
- District: Mladá Boleslav
- First mentioned: 1352

Area
  - Total: 1.66 km^{2} (0.64 sq mi)
- Elevation: 255 m (837 ft)

Population (2026-01-01)
  - Total: 83
  - Density: 50/km^{2} (130/sq mi)
- Time zone: UTC+1 (CET)
  - Summer (DST): UTC+2 (CEST)
- Postal code: 294 04
- Website: www.ritonice.cz

Řitonice is a municipality and village in Mladá Boleslav District in the Central Bohemian Region of the Czech Republic. It has about 80 inhabitants.

== Demographics ==
Historical population
Year	Pop.	±%
1869	205	—
1880	201	−2.0%
1890	195	−3.0%
1900	153	−21.5%
1910	165	+7.8%
1921	159	−3.6%
1930	151	−5.0%
1950	110	−27.2%
1961	115	+4.5%
1970	92	−20.0%
1980	87	−5.4%
1991	76	−12.6%
2001	69	−9.2%
2011	91	+31.9%
2021	79	−13.2%
Source: Censuses
