= Mladá Boleslav District =

Mladá Boleslav District Okres Mladá Boleslav
- District
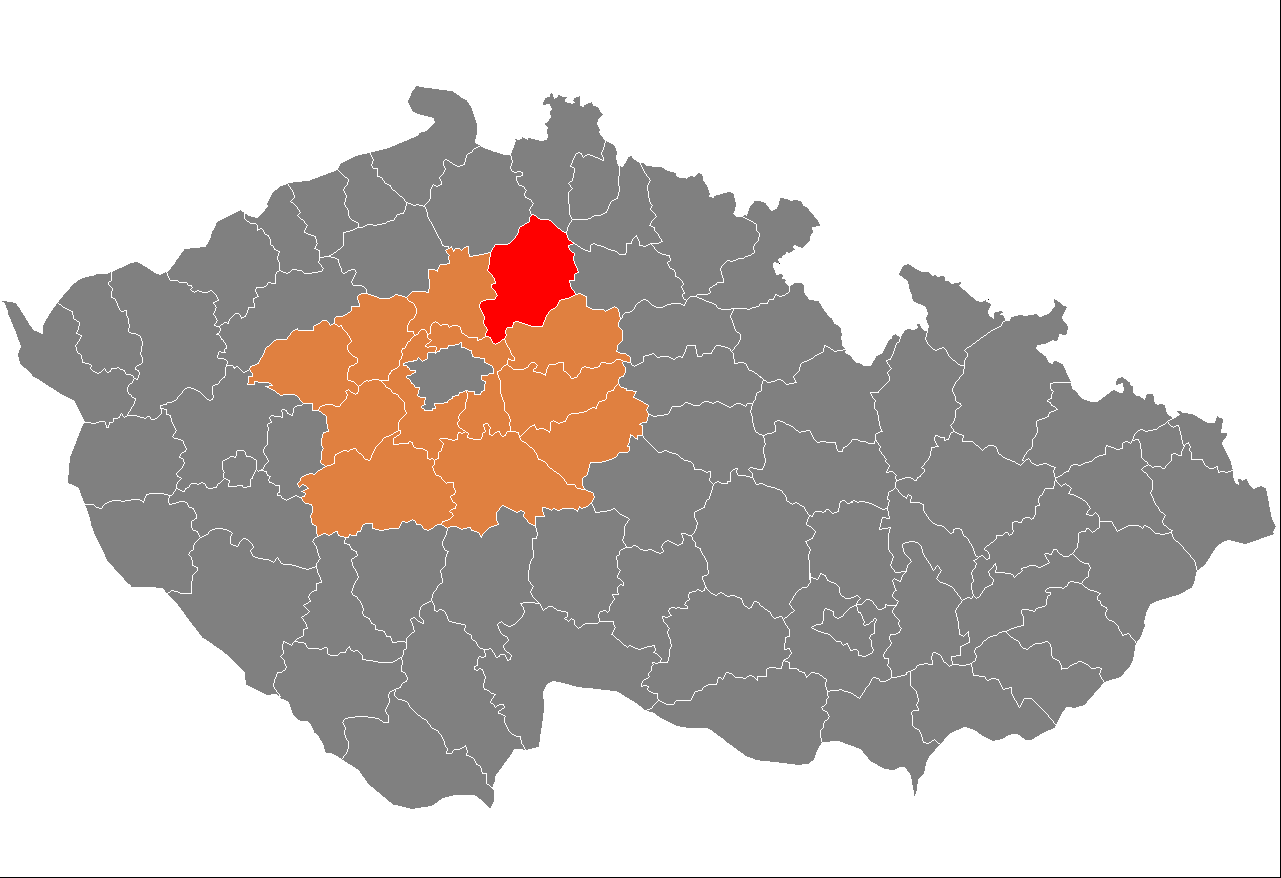
- Location in the Central Bohemian Region within the Czech Republic
- Coordinates: 50°25′N 14°54′E
- Country: Czech Republic
- Region: Central Bohemian
- Capital: Mladá Boleslav

Area
  - Total: 1,022.88 km^{2} (394.94 sq mi)

Population (2026)
  - Total: 138,955
  - Density: 135.847/km^{2} (351.842/sq mi)
- Time zone: UTC+1 (CET)
  - Summer (DST): UTC+2 (CEST)
- Municipalities: 120
- * Cities and towns: 8
- * Market towns: 5

Mladá Boleslav District (Czech: okres Mladá Boleslav) is a district in the Central Bohemian Region of the Czech Republic. Its capital is the city of Mladá Boleslav.

== Administrative division ==
Mladá Boleslav District is divided into two administrative districts of municipalities with extended competence: Mladá Boleslav and Mnichovo Hradiště.

=== List of municipalities ===
Cities and towns are marked in bold and market towns in italics:

Bakov nad Jizerou - Bělá pod Bezdězem - Benátky nad Jizerou - Bezno - Bílá Hlína - Bítouchov - Boreč - Boseň - Bradlec - Branžež - Březina - Březno - Březovice - Brodce - Bukovno - Čachovice - Charvatce - Chocnějovice - Chotětov - Chudíř - Čistá - Ctiměřice - Dalovice - Dlouhá Lhota - Dobrovice - Dobšín - Dolní Bousov - Dolní Krupá - Dolní Slivno - Dolní Stakory - Domousnice - Doubravička - Horky nad Jizerou - Horní Bukovina - Horní Slivno - Hrdlořezy - Hrušov - Husí Lhota - Jabkenice - Jivina - Jizerní Vtelno - Josefův Důl - Katusice - Klášter Hradiště nad Jizerou - Kluky - Kněžmost - Kobylnice - Kochánky - Kolomuty - Koryta - Košátky - Kosmonosy - Kosořice - Kováň - Kovanec - Krásná Ves - Krnsko - Kropáčova Vrutice - Ledce - Lhotky - Lipník - Loukov - Loukovec - Luštěnice - Mečeříž - Mladá Boleslav - Mnichovo Hradiště - Mohelnice nad Jizerou - Mukařov - Němčice - Nemyslovice - Nepřevázka - Neveklovice - Niměřice - Nová Telib - Nová Ves u Bakova - Obrubce - Obruby - Pěčice - Pětikozly - Petkovy - Písková Lhota - Plazy - Plužná - Předměřice nad Jizerou - Přepeře - Prodašice - Ptýrov - Rabakov - Rohatsko - Rokytá - Rokytovec - Řepov - Řitonice - Sedlec - Semčice - Sezemice - Skalsko - Skorkov - Smilovice - Sojovice - Sovínky - Strašnov - Strážiště - Strenice - Sudoměř - Sukorady - Tuřice - Ujkovice - Velké Všelisy - Veselice - Vinařice - Vinec - Vlkava - Vrátno - Všejany - Žďár - Zdětín - Žerčice - Židněves

== Geography ==
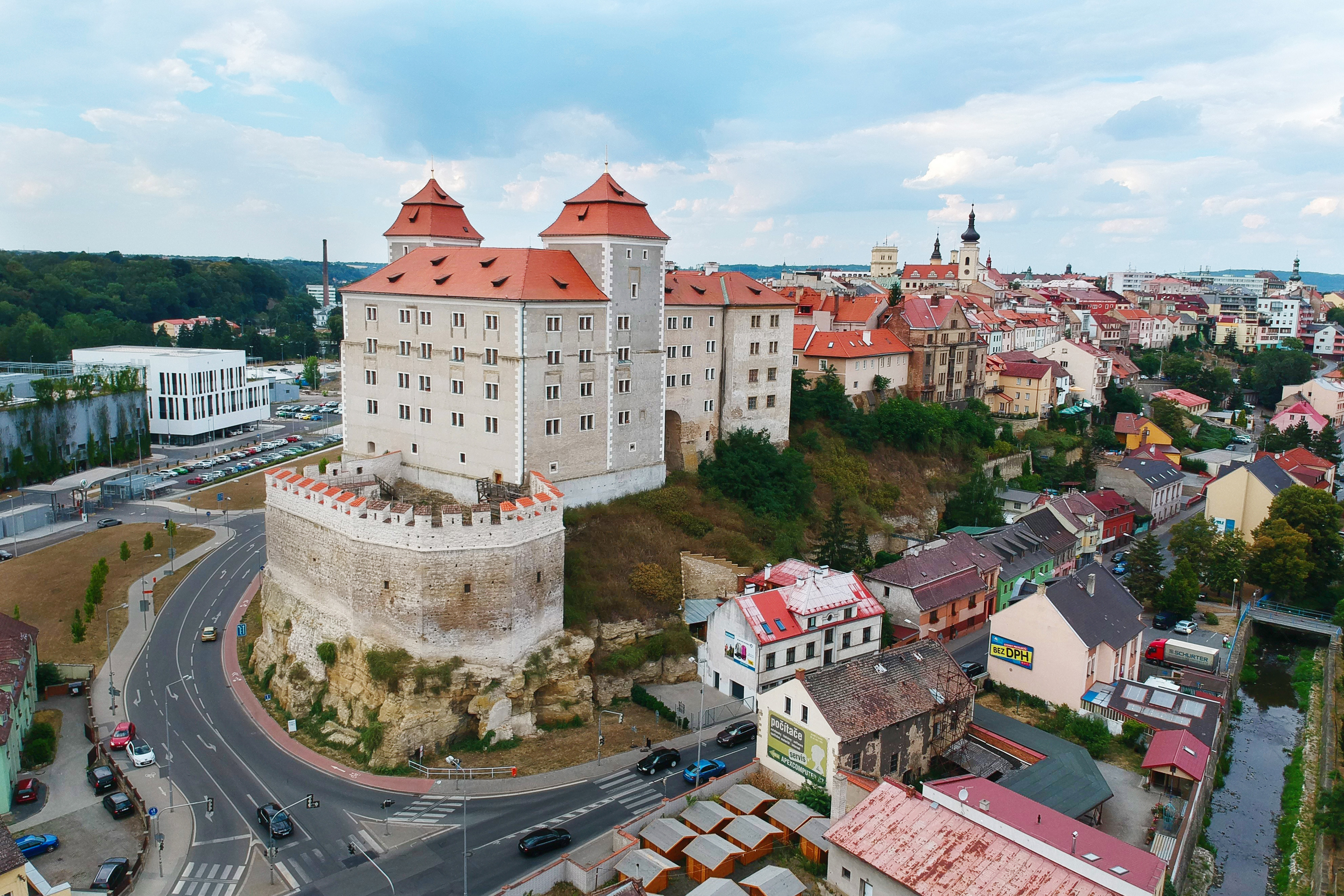
Promontory above the confluence of the Jizera and Klenice rivers in Mladá Boleslav

The northern part of the district is relatively hilly, the southern part is flat. The territory extends into three geomorphological mesoregions: Jizera Table (most of the territory), Jičín Uplands (northeastern part) and Central Elbe Table (small southern part). The highest point of the district is the hill Mužský in Boseň with an elevation of 463 m (1,519 ft), the lowest point is the river bed of the Jizera in Skorkov at 170 m (560 ft).

From the total district area of 1,022.9 km^{2} (394.9 sq mi), agricultural land occupies 637.9 km^{2} (246.3 sq mi), forests occupy 266.9 km^{2} (103.1 sq mi), and water area occupies 14.7 km^{2} (5.7 sq mi). Forests cover 38.1% of the district's area.

The most important river is the Jizera, which flows across the entire territory. Its longest tributary within the district is the Klenice. The western part of the district is poor in streams and bodies of water, which are mostly concentrated in the eastern part of the district. The largest bodies of water are the fishponds Komárovský (54 ha), Červenský (45 ha) and Žabakor (45 ha).

Bohemian Paradise is the only protected landscape area that extends into the district, in its northeastern part.

== Demographics ==
Historical population

Year	Pop.	±%
1869	90,208	—
1880	98,333	+9.0%
1890	101,990	+3.7%
1900	107,171	+5.1%
1910	115,983	+8.2%

Year	Pop.	±%
1921	115,767	−0.2%
1930	120,755	+4.3%
1950	99,791	−17.4%
1961	105,893	+6.1%
1970	105,299	−0.6%

Year	Pop.	±%
1980	112,978	+7.3%
1991	110,664	−2.0%
2001	113,241	+2.3%
2011	123,659	+9.2%
2021	128,901	+4.2%

Source: Censuses

=== Most populous municipalities ===
Name	Population	Area (km^{2})
Mladá Boleslav	47,874	29
Mnichovo Hradiště	9,123	34
Benátky nad Jizerou	7,963	36
Kosmonosy	5,437	11
Bakov nad Jizerou	5,355	27
Bělá pod Bezdězem	4,815	63
Dobrovice	3,643	25
Dolní Bousov	3,059	24
Luštěnice	2,369	15
Kněžmost	2,346	40

== Economy ==
The largest employers with headquarters in Mladá Boleslav District and at least 500 employeers are:

Economic entity	Location	Number of employees	Main activity
Škoda Auto	Mladá Boleslav	10,000+	Automobile manufacture
Regional Hospital Mladá Boleslav	Mladá Boleslav	2,000–2,499	Health care
Emerge	Bakov nad Jizerou	500–999	Automotive industry
TTD Tereos	Dobrovice	500–999	Sugar and alcohol manufacture
Psychiatric Hospital Kosmonosy	Kosmonosy	500–999	Health care
Faurecia Emissions Control Technologies	Mladá Boleslav	500–999	Automotive industry
Mahle Behr	Mnichovo Hradiště	500–999	Automotive industry
Würth	Nepřevázka	500–999	Wholesale trade

== Transport ==
The D10 motorway from Prague to Turnov passes through the district.

== Sights ==
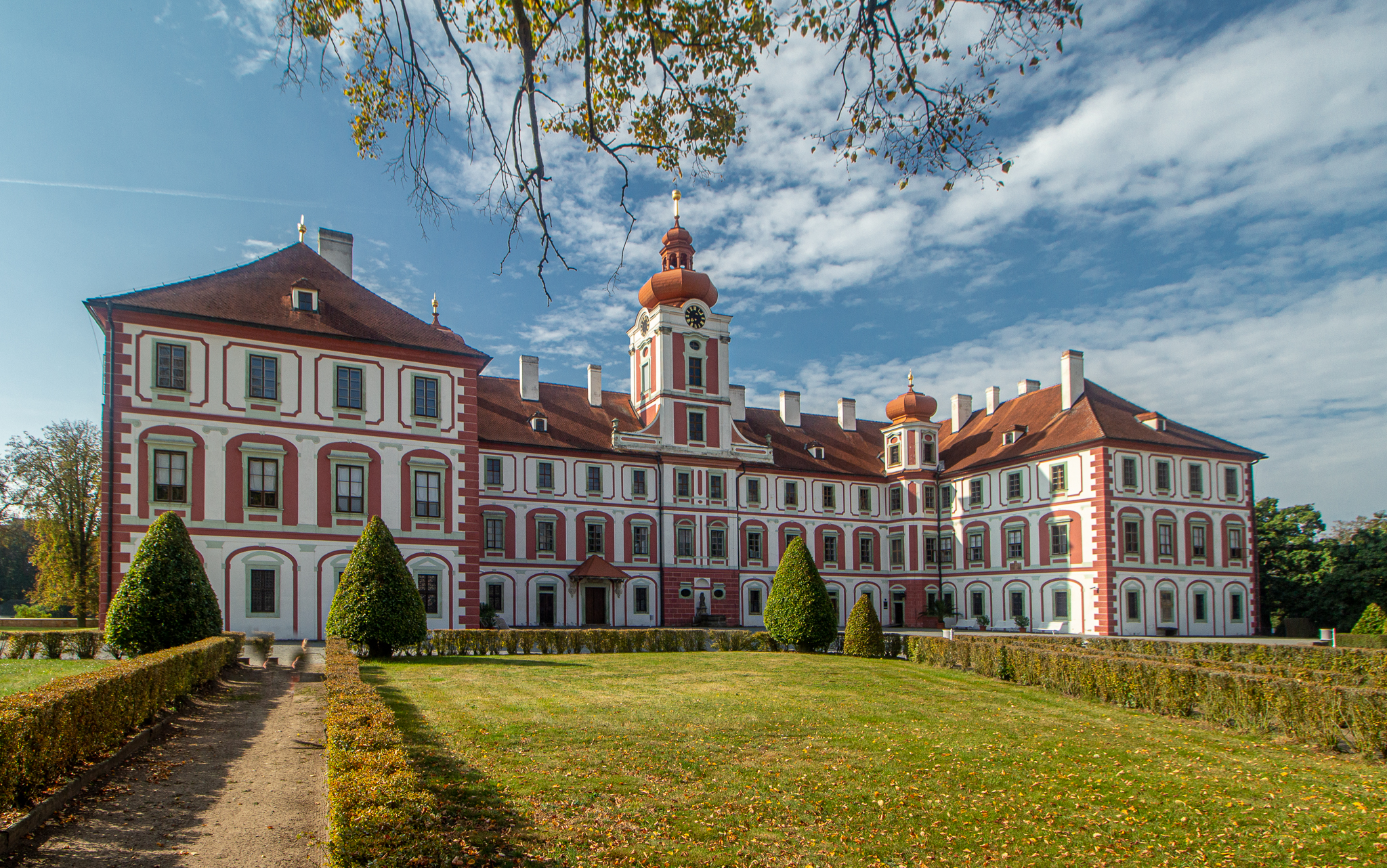
Mnichovo Hradiště Castle

The most important monuments in the district, protected as national cultural monuments, are:

- Mnichovo Hradiště Castle
- Church of Saint Nicholas in Vinec
- Secondary Industrial School in Mladá Boleslav

The best-preserved settlements, protected as monument reservations and monument zones, are:

- Mužský (monument reservation)
- Víska (monument reservation)
- Bělá pod Bezdězem
- Benátky nad Jizerou
- Mladá Boleslav
- Mnichovo Hradiště
- Březinka
- Kluky
- Loukov
- Skalsko
- Střehom

The most visited tourist destination is the Škoda Auto Museum in Mladá Boleslav.
