= Veselice =

- Municipality
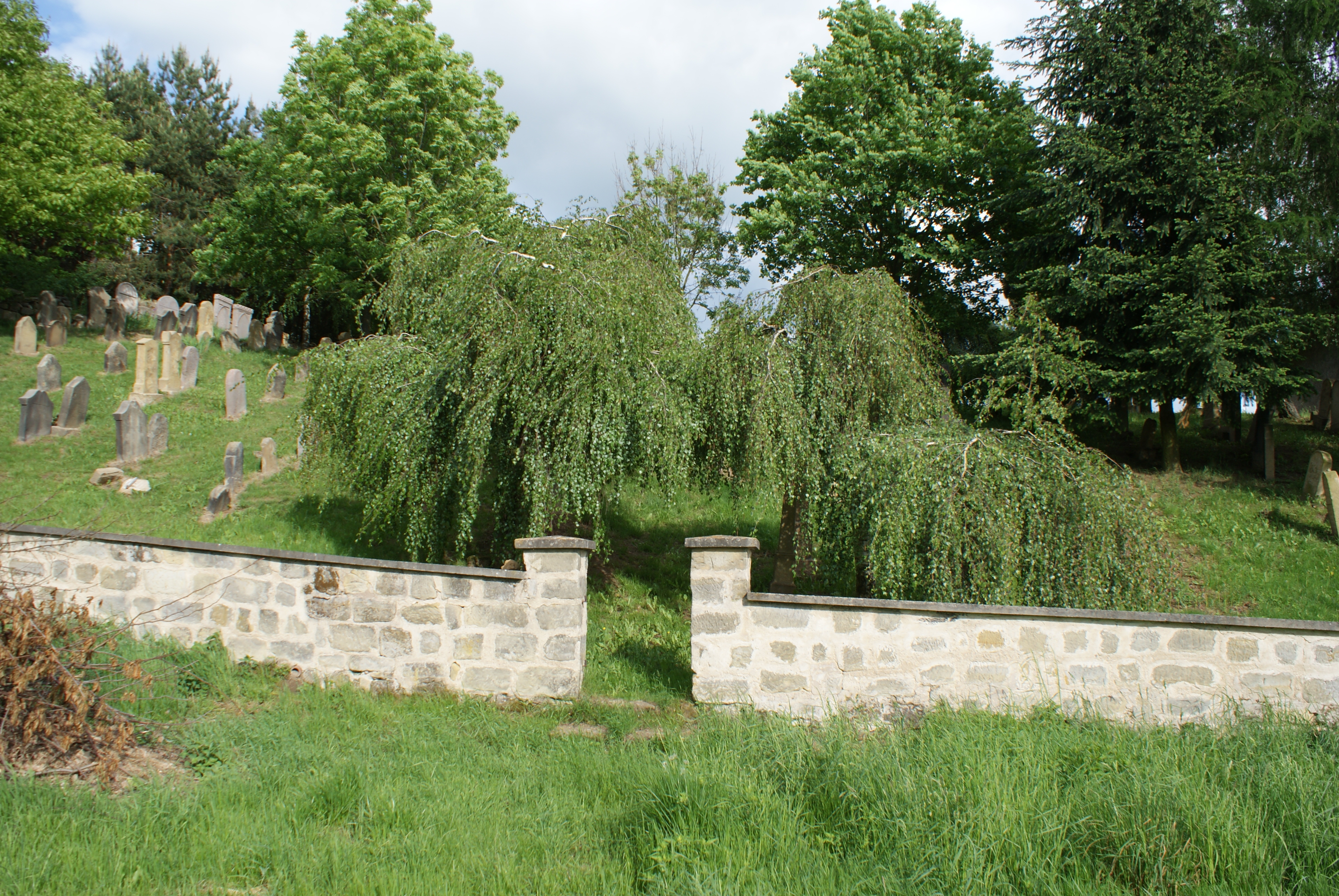
- Jewish cemetery

- Location in the Czech Republic
- Coordinates: 50°23′46″N 15°7′38″E
- Country: Czech Republic
- Region: Central Bohemian
- District: Mladá Boleslav
- First mentioned: 1397

Area
  - Total: 2.90 km^{2} (1.12 sq mi)
- Elevation: 365 m (1,198 ft)

Population (2026-01-01)
  - Total: 122
  - Density: 42.1/km^{2} (109/sq mi)
- Time zone: UTC+1 (CET)
  - Summer (DST): UTC+2 (CEST)
- Postal code: 294 04
- Website: www.veselice.e-obec.cz

Veselice is a municipality and village in Mladá Boleslav District in the Central Bohemian Region of the Czech Republic. It has about 100 inhabitants.

== Demographics ==
Historical population
Year	Pop.	±%
1869	363	—
1880	327	−9.9%
1890	333	+1.8%
1900	284	−14.7%
1910	266	−6.3%
1921	275	+3.4%
1930	275	+0.0%
1950	174	−36.7%
1961	167	−4.0%
1970	163	−2.4%
1980	146	−10.4%
1991	119	−18.5%
2001	103	−13.4%
2011	132	+28.2%
2021	130	−1.5%
Source: Censuses
