= Rabakov =

- Municipality
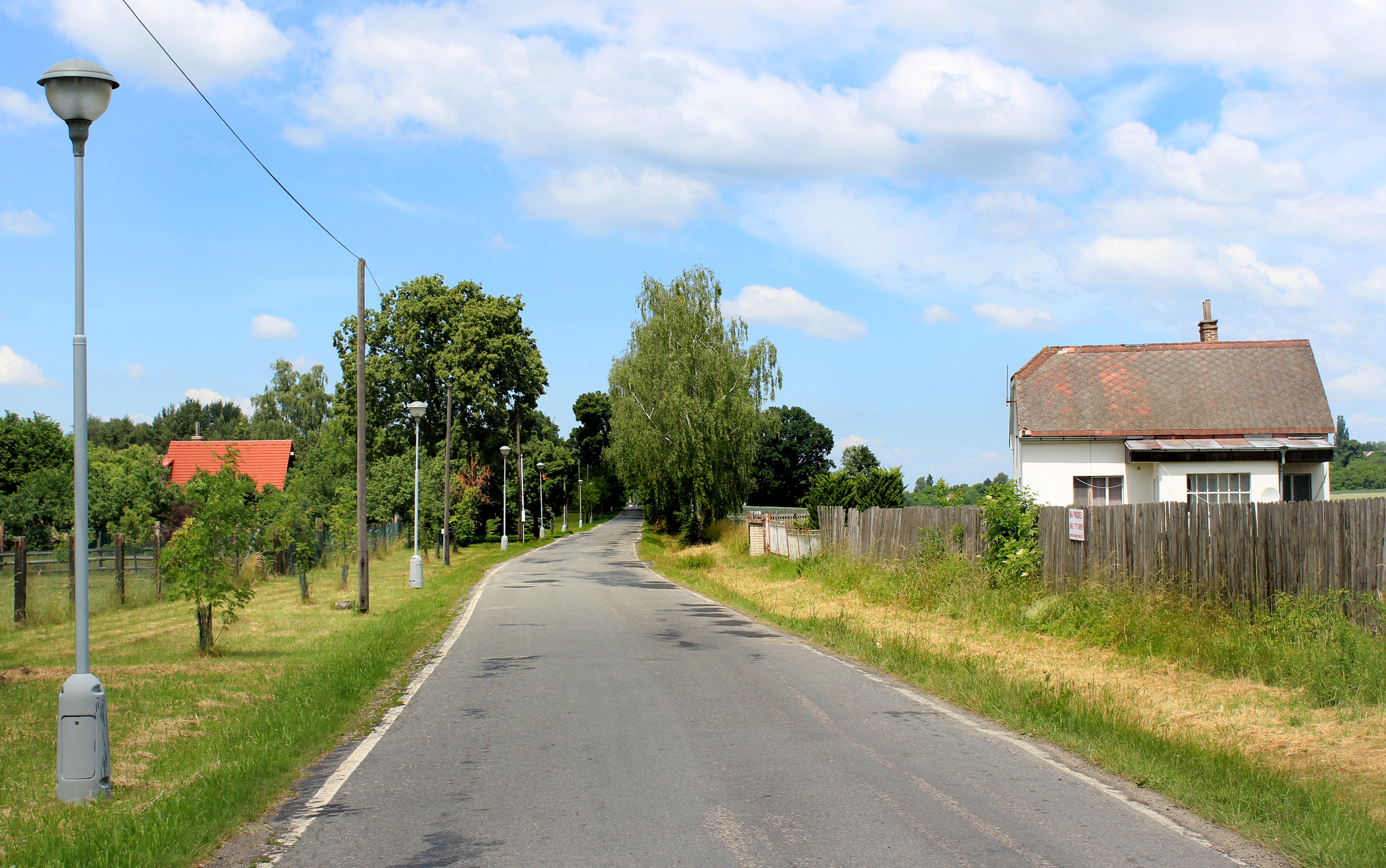
- Main road

- Location in the Czech Republic
- Coordinates: 50°23′9″N 15°6′6″E
- Country: Czech Republic
- Region: Central Bohemian
- District: Mladá Boleslav
- First mentioned: 1445

Area
  - Total: 2.08 km^{2} (0.80 sq mi)
- Elevation: 215 m (705 ft)

Population (2026-01-01)
  - Total: 64
  - Density: 31/km^{2} (80/sq mi)
- Time zone: UTC+1 (CET)
  - Summer (DST): UTC+2 (CEST)
- Postal code: 294 04
- Website: www.rabakov.cz

Rabakov is a municipality and village in Mladá Boleslav District in the Central Bohemian Region of the Czech Republic. It has about 60 inhabitants.

== Demographics ==
Historical population
Year	Pop.	±%
1869	95	—
1880	99	+4.2%
1890	100	+1.0%
1900	90	−10.0%
1910	111	+23.3%
1921	111	+0.0%
1930	96	−13.5%
1950	99	+3.1%
1961	85	−14.1%
1970	68	−20.0%
1980	51	−25.0%
1991	31	−39.2%
2001	29	−6.5%
2011	56	+93.1%
2021	55	−1.8%
Source: Censuses
