= Strenice =

- Municipality
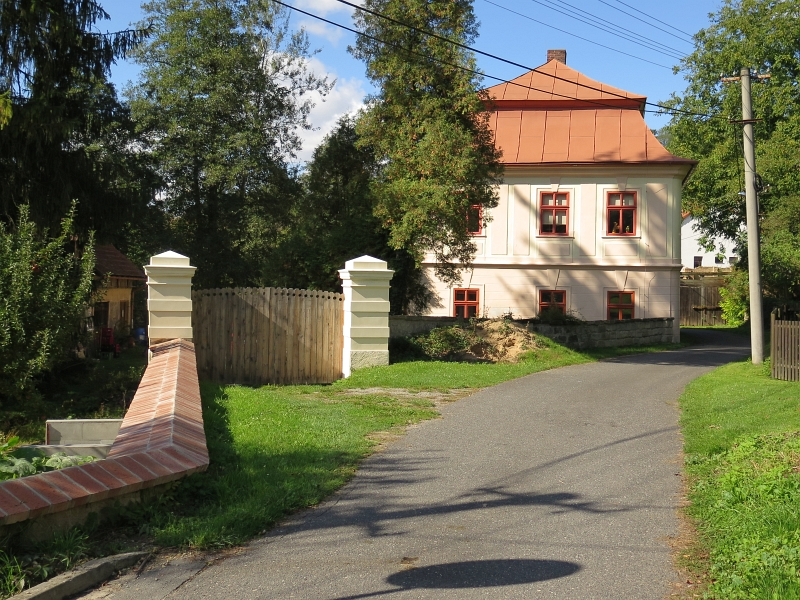
- Rectory

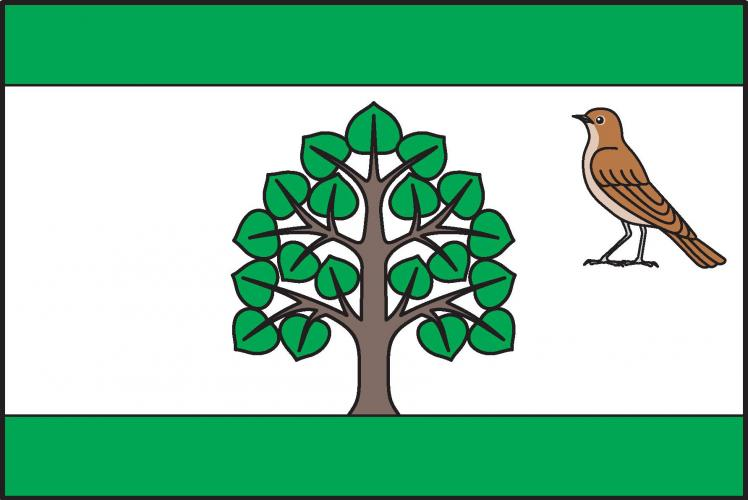
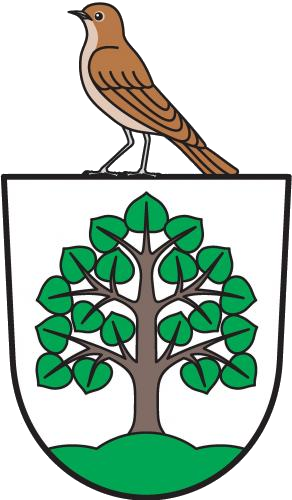
- Flag Coat of arms

- Location in the Czech Republic
- Coordinates: 50°23′33″N 14°49′23″E
- Country: Czech Republic
- Region: Central Bohemian
- District: Mladá Boleslav
- First mentioned: 1352

Area
  - Total: 4.24 km^{2} (1.64 sq mi)
- Elevation: 219 m (719 ft)

Population (2026-01-01)
  - Total: 203
  - Density: 47.9/km^{2} (124/sq mi)
- Time zone: UTC+1 (CET)
  - Summer (DST): UTC+2 (CEST)
- Postal code: 294 30
- Website: www.strenice.cz

Strenice is a municipality and village in Mladá Boleslav District in the Central Bohemian Region of the Czech Republic. It has about 200 inhabitants.

== Demographics ==
Historical population
Year	Pop.	±%
1869	400	—
1880	511	+27.8%
1890	511	+0.0%
1900	525	+2.7%
1910	532	+1.3%
1921	482	−9.4%
1930	451	−6.4%
1950	331	−26.6%
1961	316	−4.5%
1970	292	−7.6%
1980	200	−31.5%
1991	164	−18.0%
2001	162	−1.2%
2011	185	+14.2%
2021	200	+8.1%
Source: Censuses
