= Ptýrov =

- Municipality
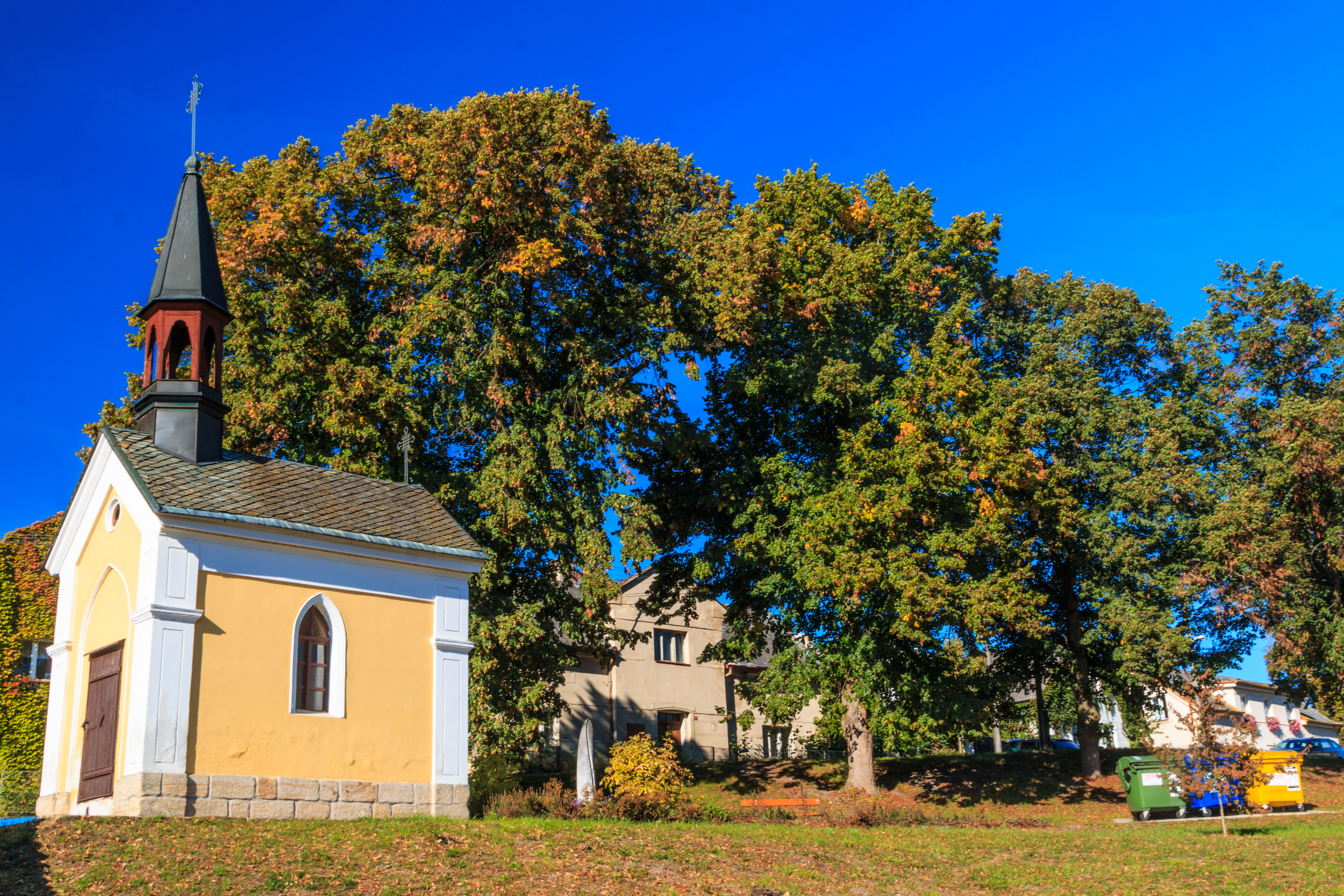
- Centre of Ptýrov

- Flag Coat of arms

- Location in the Czech Republic
- Coordinates: 50°30′18″N 14°56′50″E
- Country: Czech Republic
- Region: Central Bohemian
- District: Mladá Boleslav
- First mentioned: 1345

Area
  - Total: 4.91 km^{2} (1.90 sq mi)
- Elevation: 221 m (725 ft)

Population (2026-01-01)
  - Total: 385
  - Density: 78.4/km^{2} (203/sq mi)
- Time zone: UTC+1 (CET)
  - Summer (DST): UTC+2 (CEST)
- Postal code: 295 01
- Website: www.obec-ptyrov.cz

Ptýrov is a municipality and village in Mladá Boleslav District in the Central Bohemian Region of the Czech Republic. It has about 400 inhabitants.

== Administrative division ==
Ptýrov consists of four municipal parts (in brackets population according to the 2021 census):

- Ptýrov (135)
- Čihátka (13)
- Maníkovice (71)
- Ptýrovec (66)

== Demographics ==
Historical population
Year	Pop.	±%
1869	405	—
1880	382	−5.7%
1890	341	−10.7%
1900	351	+2.9%
1910	354	+0.9%
1921	368	+4.0%
1930	349	−5.2%
1950	255	−26.9%
1961	259	+1.6%
1970	220	−15.1%
1980	200	−9.1%
1991	161	−19.5%
2001	152	−5.6%
2011	221	+45.4%
2021	285	+29.0%
Source: Censuses
