= Nová Telib =

- Municipality
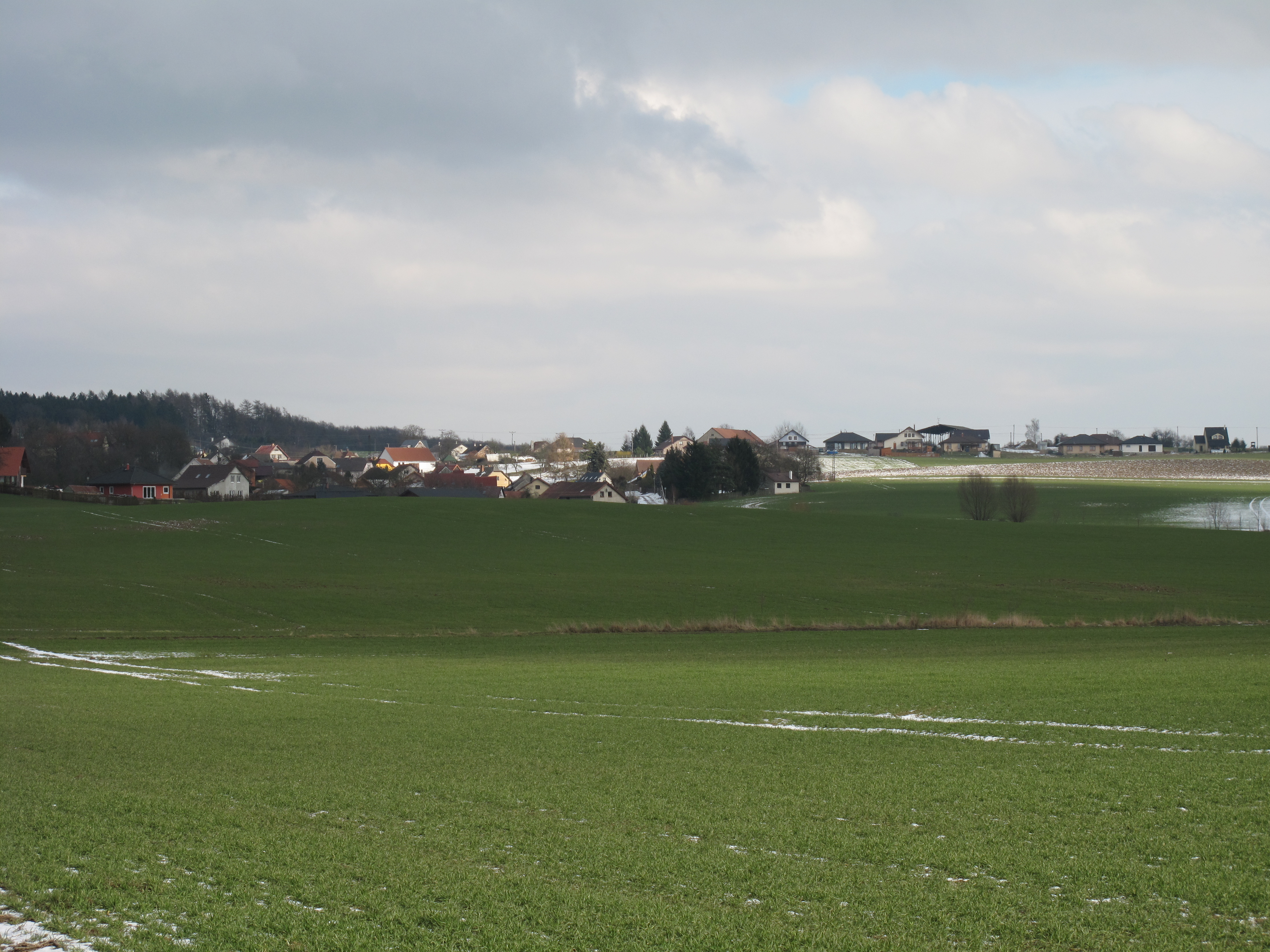
- General view

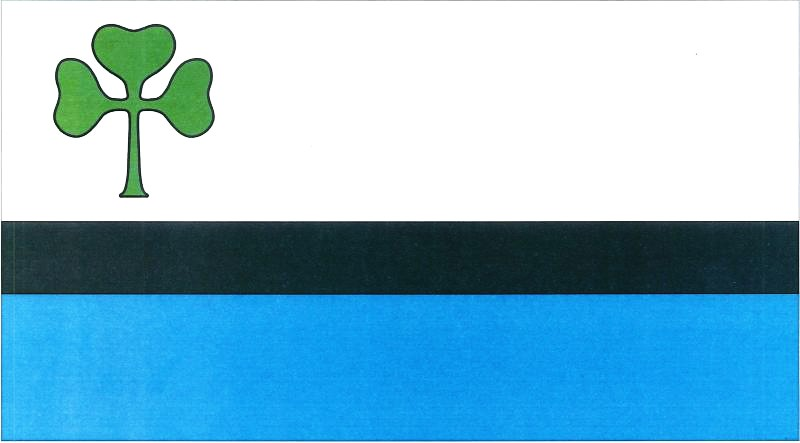
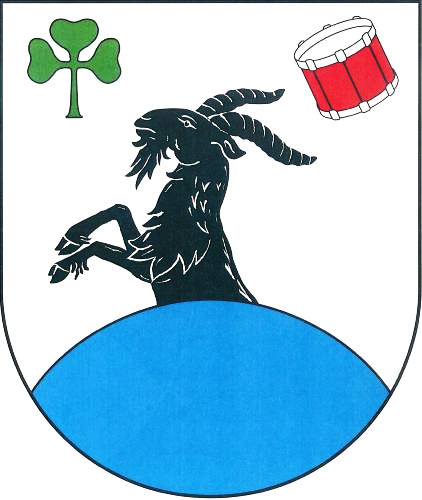
- Flag Coat of arms

- Location in the Czech Republic
- Coordinates: 50°23′28″N 15°1′59″E
- Country: Czech Republic
- Region: Central Bohemian
- District: Mladá Boleslav
- First mentioned: 1378

Area
  - Total: 3.37 km^{2} (1.30 sq mi)
- Elevation: 230 m (750 ft)

Population (2026-01-01)
  - Total: 301
  - Density: 89.3/km^{2} (231/sq mi)
- Time zone: UTC+1 (CET)
  - Summer (DST): UTC+2 (CEST)
- Postal code: 294 06
- Website: www.nova-telib.cz

Nová Telib is a municipality and village in Mladá Boleslav District in the Central Bohemian Region of the Czech Republic. It has about 300 inhabitants.

== Administrative division ==
Nová Telib consists of two municipal parts (in brackets population according to the 2021 census):

- Nová Telib (262)
- Kladěruby (30)

== Demographics ==
Historical population
Year	Pop.	±%
1869	298	—
1880	316	+6.0%
1890	300	−5.1%
1900	292	−2.7%
1910	282	−3.4%
1921	273	−3.2%
1930	263	−3.7%
1950	187	−28.9%
1961	190	+1.6%
1970	168	−11.6%
1980	170	+1.2%
1991	149	−12.4%
2001	153	+2.7%
2011	231	+51.0%
2021	292	+26.4%
Source: Censuses
