= Kolomuty =

- Municipality
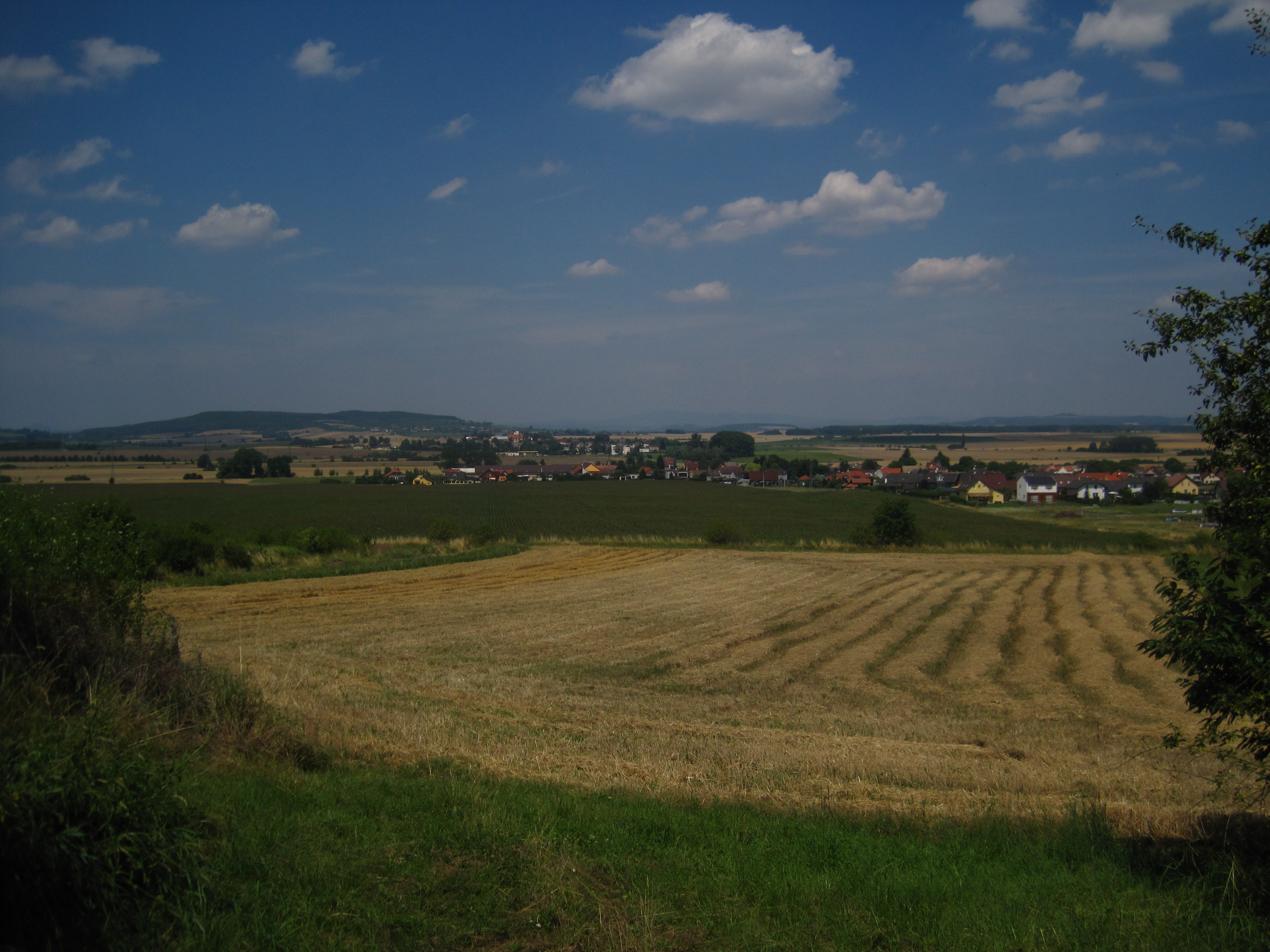
- View from the south

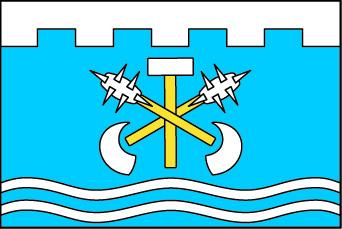
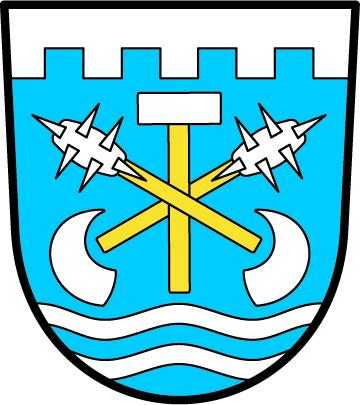
- Flag Coat of arms

- Location in the Czech Republic
- Coordinates: 50°24′8″N 14°58′45″E
- Country: Czech Republic
- Region: Central Bohemian
- District: Mladá Boleslav
- First mentioned: 1297

Area
  - Total: 2.27 km^{2} (0.88 sq mi)
- Elevation: 212 m (696 ft)

Population (2026-01-01)
  - Total: 460
  - Density: 200/km^{2} (520/sq mi)
- Time zone: UTC+1 (CET)
  - Summer (DST): UTC+2 (CEST)
- Postal code: 293 01
- Website: www.kolomuty.cz

Kolomuty is a municipality and village in Mladá Boleslav District in the Central Bohemian Region of the Czech Republic. It has about 500 inhabitants.

== Demographics ==
Historical population
Year	Pop.	±%
1869	161	—
1880	155	−3.7%
1890	169	+9.0%
1900	156	−7.7%
1910	154	−1.3%
1921	164	+6.5%
1930	177	+7.9%
1950	147	−16.9%
1961	150	+2.0%
1970	154	+2.7%
1980	167	+8.4%
1991	163	−2.4%
2001	175	+7.4%
2011	301	+72.0%
2021	446	+48.2%
Source: Censuses
