= Řepov =

- Municipality
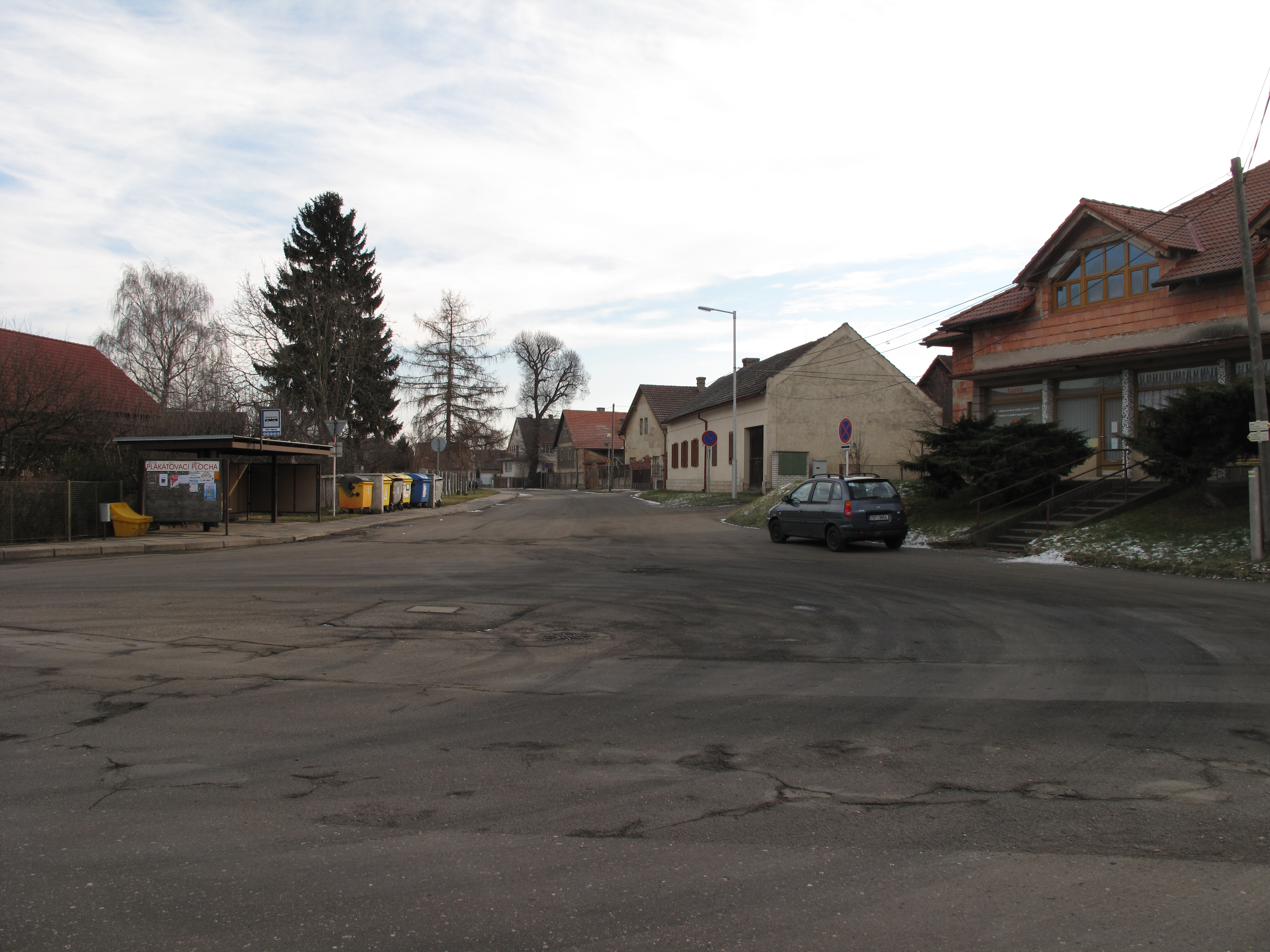
- Common in Řepov

- Flag Coat of arms

- Location in the Czech Republic
- Coordinates: 50°24′9″N 14°57′26″E
- Country: Czech Republic
- Region: Central Bohemian
- District: Mladá Boleslav
- Founded: 1787

Area
  - Total: 2.38 km^{2} (0.92 sq mi)
- Elevation: 210 m (690 ft)

Population (2026-01-01)
  - Total: 786
  - Density: 330/km^{2} (855/sq mi)
- Time zone: UTC+1 (CET)
  - Summer (DST): UTC+2 (CEST)
- Postal code: 293 01
- Website: www.repov.cz

Řepov is a municipality and village in Mladá Boleslav District in the Central Bohemian Region of the Czech Republic. It has about 800 inhabitants.

== History ==
Řepov was founded in 1787.

== Demographics ==
Historical population
Year	Pop.	±%
1869	192	—
1880	204	+6.2%
1890	227	+11.3%
1900	437	+92.5%
1910	489	+11.9%
1921	534	+9.2%
1930	615	+15.2%
1950	497	−19.2%
1961	528	+6.2%
1970	503	−4.7%
1980	528	+5.0%
1991	545	+3.2%
2001	552	+1.3%
2011	704	+27.5%
2021	768	+9.1%
Source: Censuses
