= Ujkovice =

- Municipality
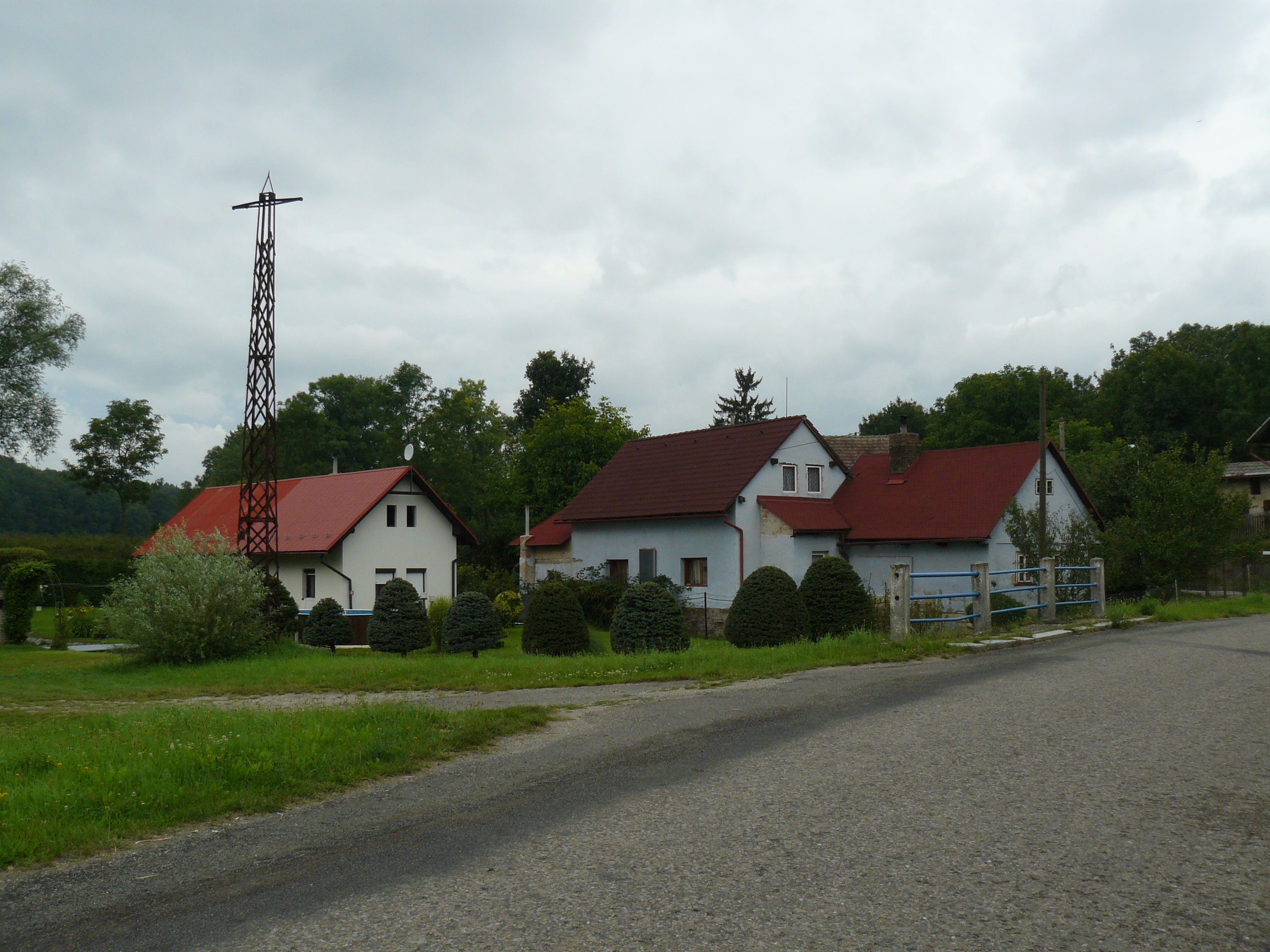
- Houses in Ujkovice

- Location in the Czech Republic
- Coordinates: 50°22′0″N 15°5′59″E
- Country: Czech Republic
- Region: Central Bohemian
- District: Mladá Boleslav
- First mentioned: 1088

Area
  - Total: 6.54 km^{2} (2.53 sq mi)
- Elevation: 250 m (820 ft)

Population (2026-01-01)
  - Total: 114
  - Density: 17.4/km^{2} (45.1/sq mi)
- Time zone: UTC+1 (CET)
  - Summer (DST): UTC+2 (CEST)
- Postal code: 294 04
- Website: www.obecujkovice.cz

Ujkovice is a municipality and village in Mladá Boleslav District in the Central Bohemian Region of the Czech Republic. It has about 100 inhabitants.

== Demographics ==
Historical population
Year	Pop.	±%
1869	332	—
1880	383	+15.4%
1890	397	+3.7%
1900	353	−11.1%
1910	334	−5.4%
1921	328	−1.8%
1930	265	−19.2%
1950	217	−18.1%
1961	191	−12.0%
1970	142	−25.7%
1980	139	−2.1%
1991	108	−22.3%
2001	101	−6.5%
2011	88	−12.9%
2021	118	+34.1%
Source: Censuses
