= Doubravička =

- Municipality
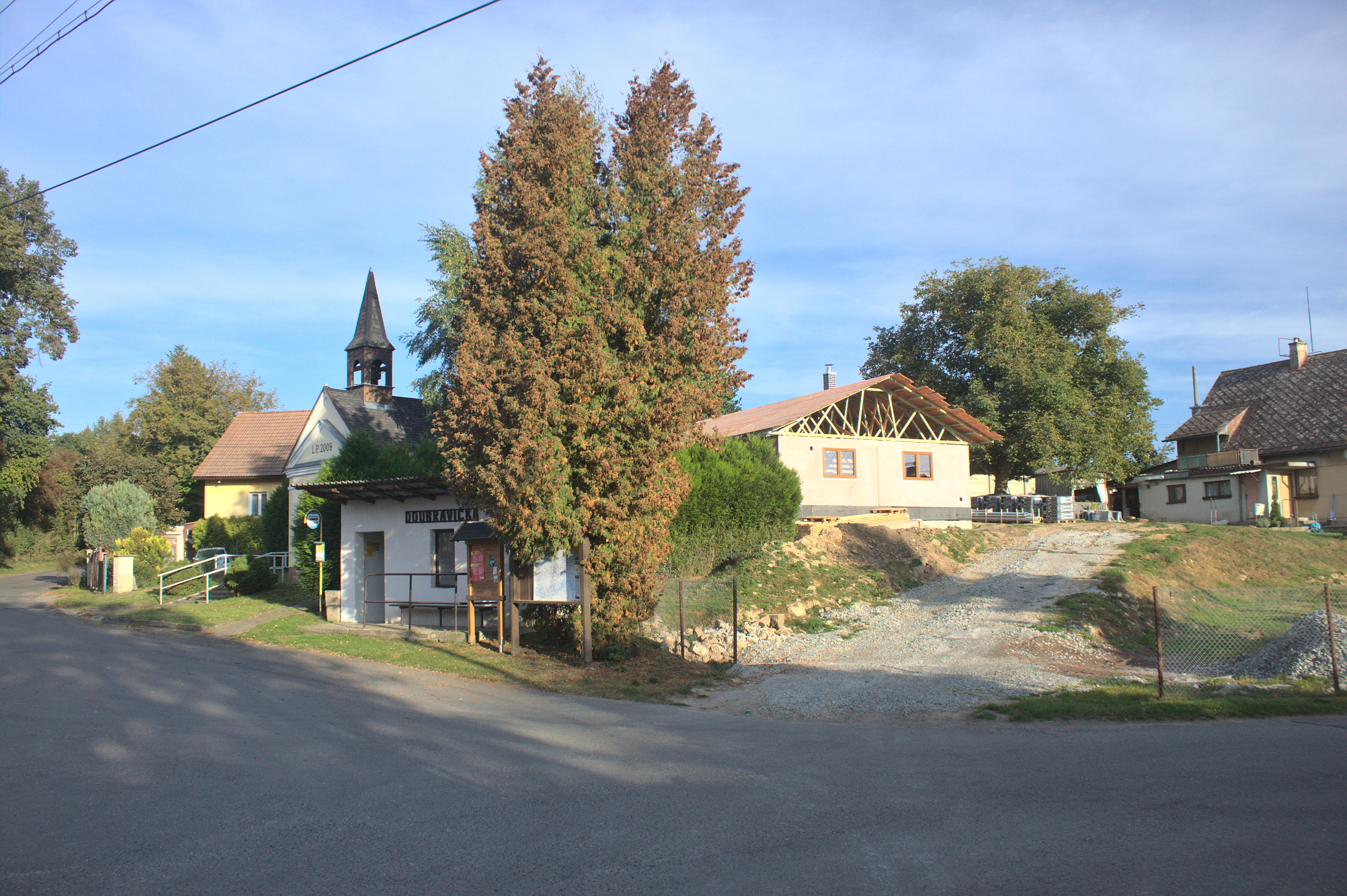
- Centre of Doubravička

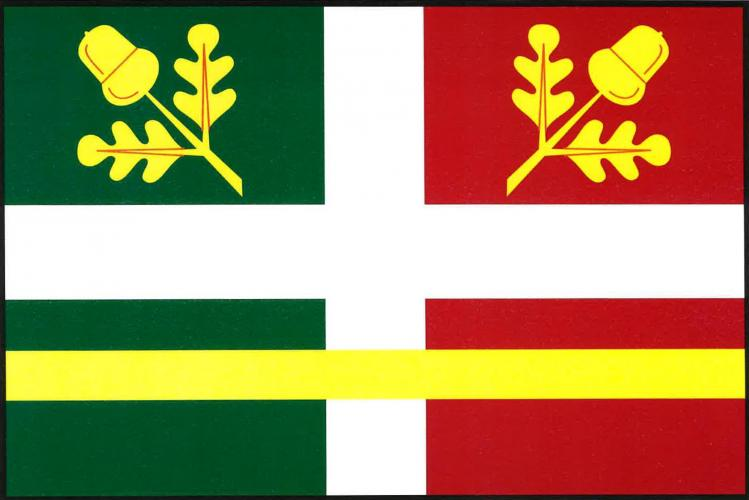
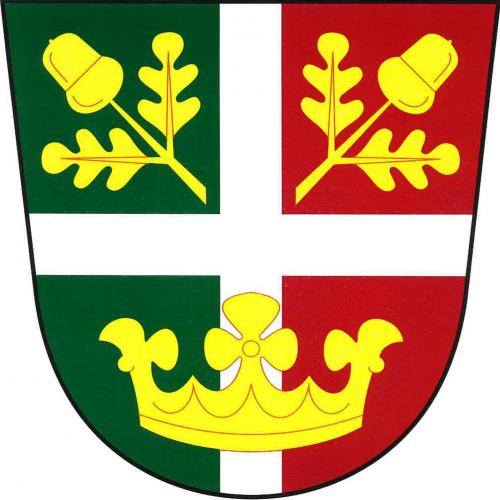
- Flag Coat of arms

- Location in the Czech Republic
- Coordinates: 50°23′43″N 14°46′34″E
- Country: Czech Republic
- Region: Central Bohemian
- District: Mladá Boleslav
- First mentioned: 1324

Area
  - Total: 2.53 km^{2} (0.98 sq mi)
- Elevation: 276 m (906 ft)

Population (2026-01-01)
  - Total: 163
  - Density: 64.4/km^{2} (167/sq mi)
- Time zone: UTC+1 (CET)
  - Summer (DST): UTC+2 (CEST)
- Postal code: 294 30
- Website: doubravickaobec.cz

Doubravička is a municipality and village in Mladá Boleslav District in the Central Bohemian Region of the Czech Republic. It has about 200 inhabitants.

== Demographics ==
Historical population
Year	Pop.	±%
1869	209	—
1880	199	−4.8%
1890	214	+7.5%
1900	246	+15.0%
1910	270	+9.8%
1921	259	−4.1%
1930	231	−10.8%
1950	134	−42.0%
1961	129	−3.7%
1970	102	−20.9%
1980	78	−23.5%
1991	73	−6.4%
2001	84	+15.1%
2011	120	+42.9%
2021	154	+28.3%
Source: Censuses
