= Prodašice =

- Municipality
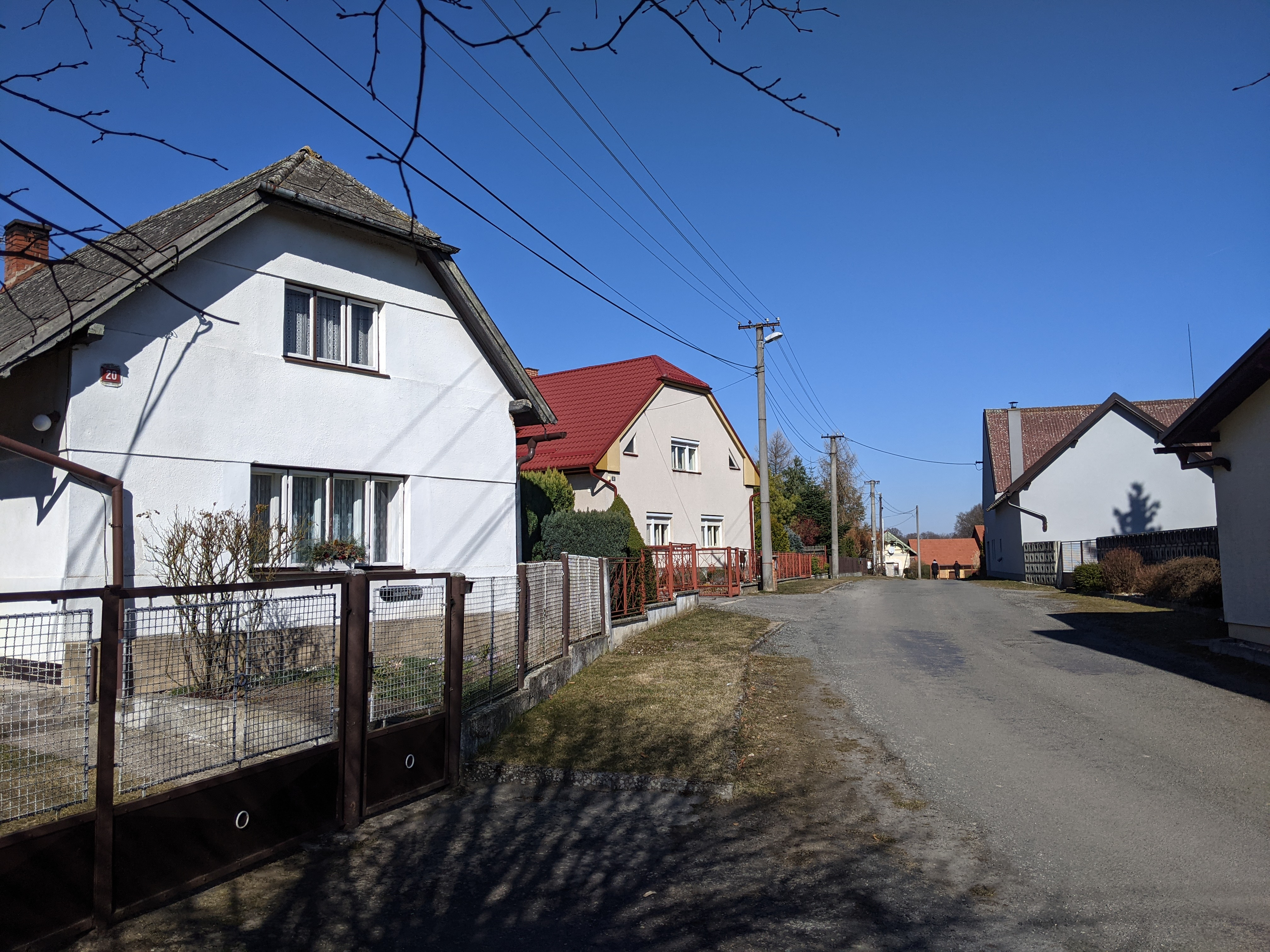
- Centre of Prodašice

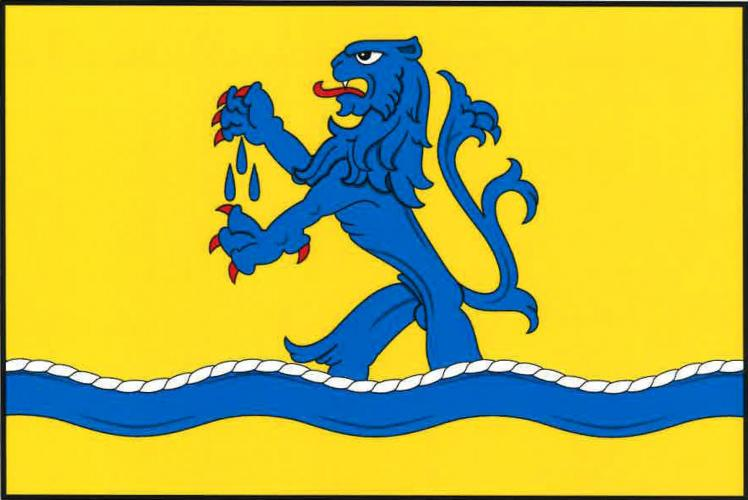
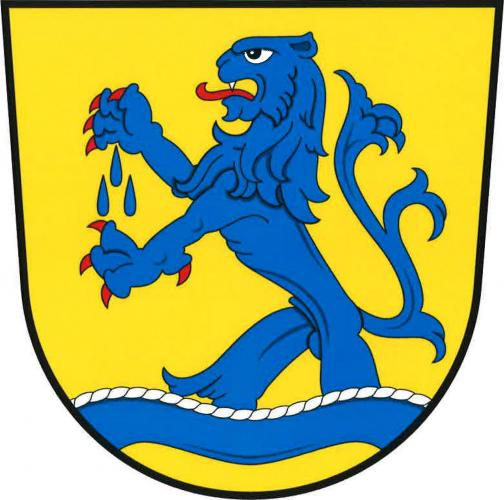
- Flag Coat of arms

- Location in the Czech Republic
- Coordinates: 50°21′0″N 15°7′0″E
- Country: Czech Republic
- Region: Central Bohemian
- District: Mladá Boleslav
- First mentioned: 1390

Area
  - Total: 2.27 km^{2} (0.88 sq mi)
- Elevation: 271 m (889 ft)

Population (2026-01-01)
  - Total: 87
  - Density: 38/km^{2} (99/sq mi)
- Time zone: UTC+1 (CET)
  - Summer (DST): UTC+2 (CEST)
- Postal code: 294 04
- Website: prodasice.estranky.cz

Prodašice is a municipality and village in Mladá Boleslav District in the Central Bohemian Region of the Czech Republic. It has about 90 inhabitants.

== Demographics ==
Historical population
| Year | Pop. | ±% |
|---|---|---|
| 1869 | 130 | — |
| 1880 | 114 | −12.3% |
| 1890 | 139 | +21.9% |
| 1900 | 154 | +10.8% |
| 1910 | 117 | −24.0% |
| 1921 | 132 | +12.8% |
| 1930 | 130 | −1.5% |
| 1950 | 106 | −18.5% |
| 1961 | 95 | −10.4% |
| 1970 | 73 | −23.2% |
| 1980 | 96 | +31.5% |
| 1991 | 100 | +4.2% |
| 2001 | 84 | −16.0% |
| 2011 | 89 | +6.0% |
| 2021 | 94 | +5.6% |
Source: Censuses
