= Strážiště =

- Municipality
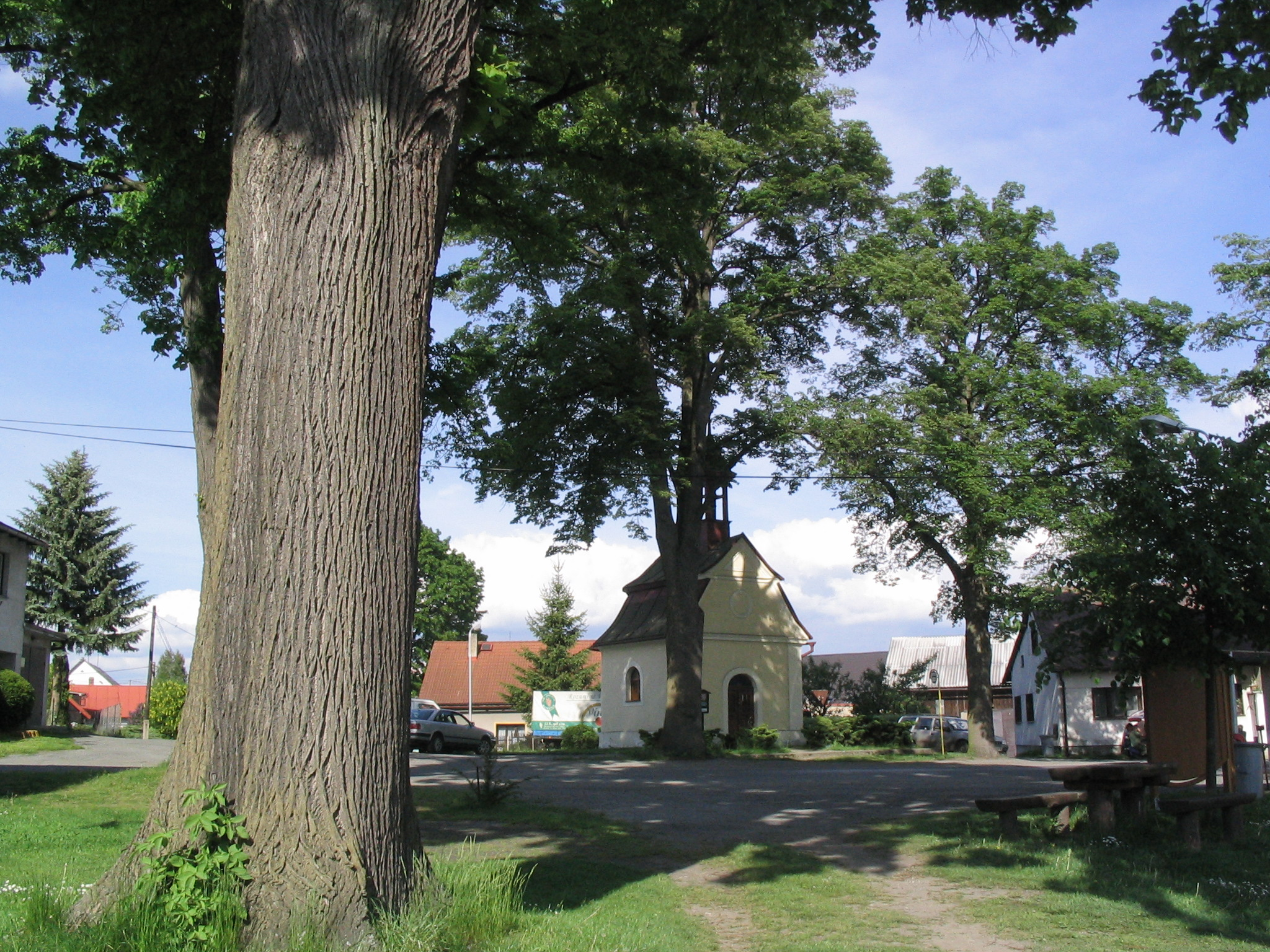
- Centre of Strážiště

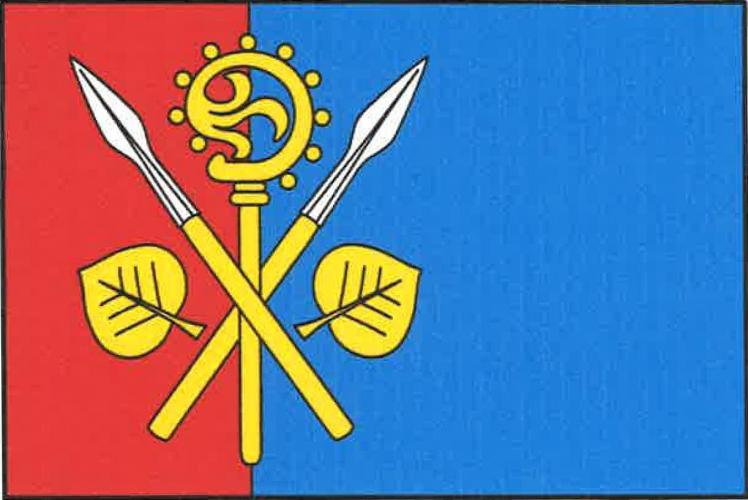
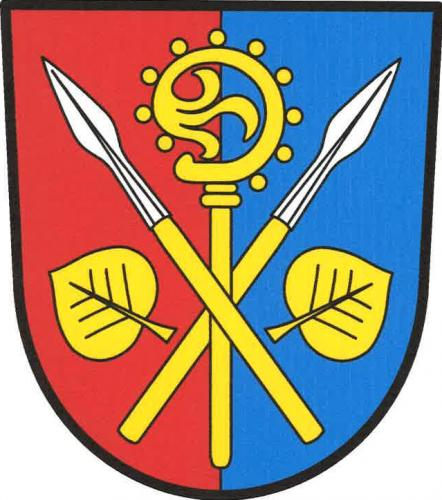
- Flag Coat of arms

- Location in the Czech Republic
- Coordinates: 50°35′33″N 14°55′45″E
- Country: Czech Republic
- Region: Central Bohemian
- District: Mladá Boleslav
- First mentioned: 1400

Area
  - Total: 4.80 km^{2} (1.85 sq mi)
- Elevation: 368 m (1,207 ft)

Population (2026-01-01)
  - Total: 133
  - Density: 27.7/km^{2} (71.8/sq mi)
- Time zone: UTC+1 (CET)
  - Summer (DST): UTC+2 (CEST)
- Postal code: 294 13
- Website: obecstraziste.cz

Strážiště is a municipality and village in Mladá Boleslav District in the Central Bohemian Region of the Czech Republic. It has about 100 inhabitants.

== Administrative division ==
Strážiště consists of two municipal parts (in brackets population according to the 2021 census):

- Strážiště (72)
- Kozmice (62)

== History ==
The first written mention of Strážiště is from 1400.

== Demographics ==
Historical population
Year	Pop.	±%
1869	427	—
1880	410	−4.0%
1890	379	−7.6%
1900	338	−10.8%
1910	351	+3.8%
1921	320	−8.8%
1930	320	+0.0%
1950	328	+2.5%
1961	199	−39.3%
1970	174	−12.6%
1980	128	−26.4%
1991	94	−26.6%
2001	95	+1.1%
2011	97	+2.1%
2021	134	+38.1%
Source: Censuses
