= Radimovice =

Radimovice may refer to places in the Czech Republic:

- Radimovice (Liberec District), a municipality and village in the Liberec Region
- Radimovice, a village and part of Petříkov (Prague-East District) in the Central Bohemian Region
- Radimovice, a village and part of Všeruby (Plzeň-North District) in the Plzeň Region
- Radimovice u Tábora, a municipality and village in the South Bohemian Region
- Radimovice u Želče, a municipality and village in the South Bohemian Region
