= Hodkovice nad Mohelkou =

Town in the Czech Republic

- Town
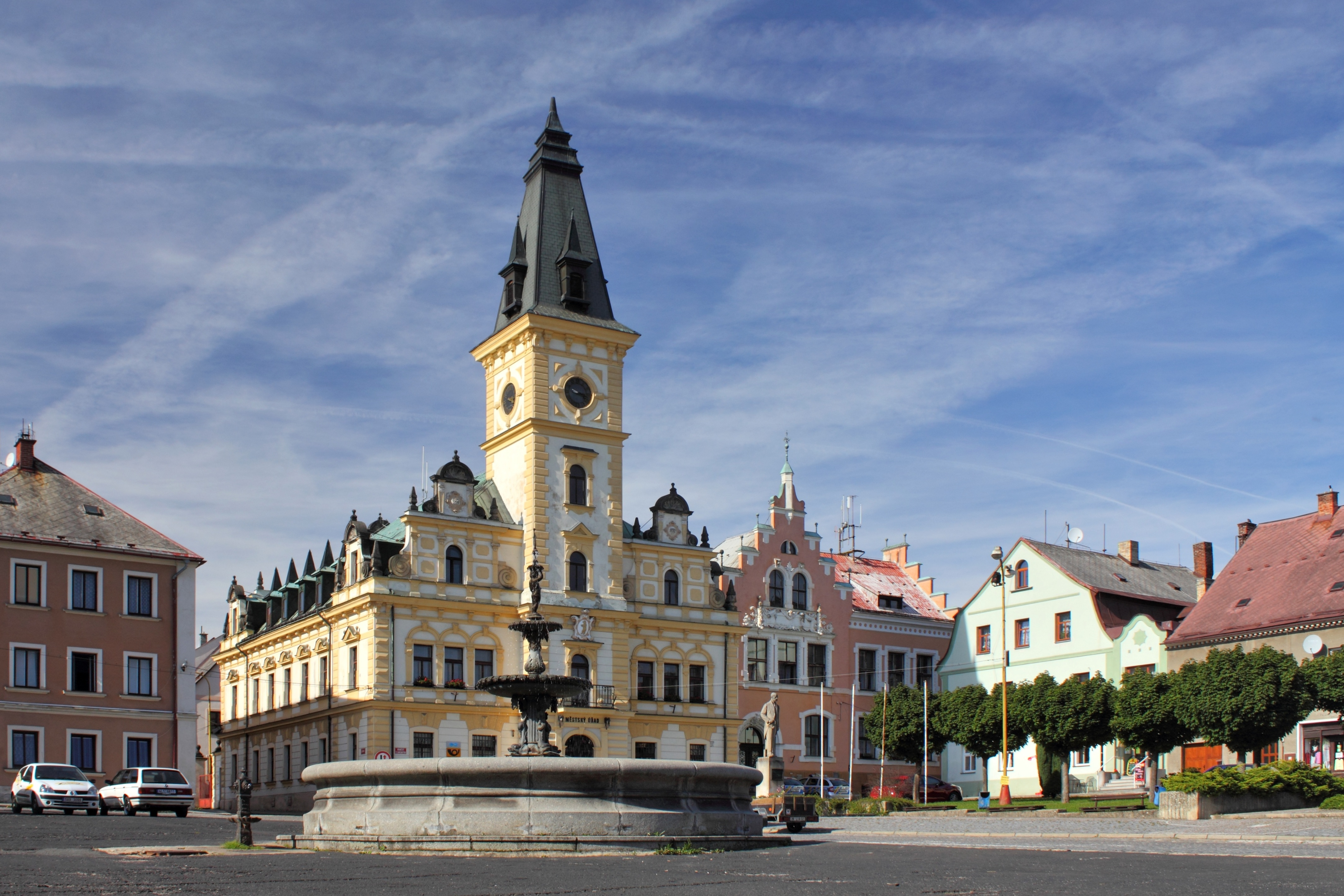
- Town square with the town hall

- Flag Coat of arms

- Location in the Czech Republic
- Coordinates: 50°39′57″N 15°5′23″E
- Country: Czech Republic
- Region: Liberec
- District: Liberec
- First mentioned: 1352

Government
  - Mayor: Markéta Khauerová

Area
  - Total: 13.49 km^{2} (5.21 sq mi)
- Elevation: 367 m (1,204 ft)

Population (2026-01-01)
  - Total: 3,024
  - Density: 224.2/km^{2} (580.6/sq mi)
- Time zone: UTC+1 (CET)
  - Summer (DST): UTC+2 (CEST)
- Postal code: 463 42
- Website: www.hodkovicenm.cz

Hodkovice nad Mohelkou (Czech pronunciation: [ˈɦodkovɪtsɛ ˈnad moɦɛlkou]; until 1949 Hodkovice; German: Liebenau) is a town in Liberec District in the Liberec Region of the Czech Republic. It has about 3,000 inhabitants. The town proper is located on the Mohelka River in the Jičín Uplands. The historic town centre is well preserved and is protected as an urban monument zone.

== Administrative division ==
Hodkovice nad Mohelkou consists of five municipal parts (in brackets population according to the 2021 census):

- Hodkovice nad Mohelkou (2,585)
- Jílové (153)
- Radoňovice (29)
- Záskalí (156)
- Žďárek (21)

== Etymology ==
The name Hodkovice is derived from the personal name Hodek, meaning "the village of Hodek's people". The German name Liebenau originated only after the Czech name and was derived from the phrase in der lieben Au (i.e. "in the lovely meadow/flooplain"). In 1949, the name of the town was changed to Hodkovice nad Mohelkou.

== Geography ==
Hodkovice nad Mohelkou is located about 9 kilometres (6 mi) south of Liberec. The southern part of the municipal territory with the built-up area lies in the Jičín Uplands. The northern part lies in the Ještěd–Kozákov Ridge and includes the highest point of Hodkovice nad Mohelkou, the hill Javorník at 684 m (2,244 ft) above sea level. The Mohelka River flows through the town.

== History ==
The first settlement in the area of today's town was probably founded in the 11th century. The first written mention of Hodkovice is from 1352. In 1806, a great fire destroyed most of the town. The archive also burned down, so it is not known when Hodkovice was promoted to a town.

== Demographics ==
Historical population

Year	Pop.	±%
1869	4,392	—
1880	4,489	+2.2%
1890	4,341	−3.3%
1900	4,308	−0.8%
1910	4,039	−6.2%

Year	Pop.	±%
1921	3,443	−14.8%
1930	3,302	−4.1%
1950	2,166	−34.4%
1961	2,268	+4.7%
1970	2,280	+0.5%

Year	Pop.	±%
1980	2,729	+19.7%
1991	2,594	−4.9%
2001	2,599	+0.2%
2011	2,827	+8.8%
2021	2,944	+4.1%

Source: Censuses

== Transport ==
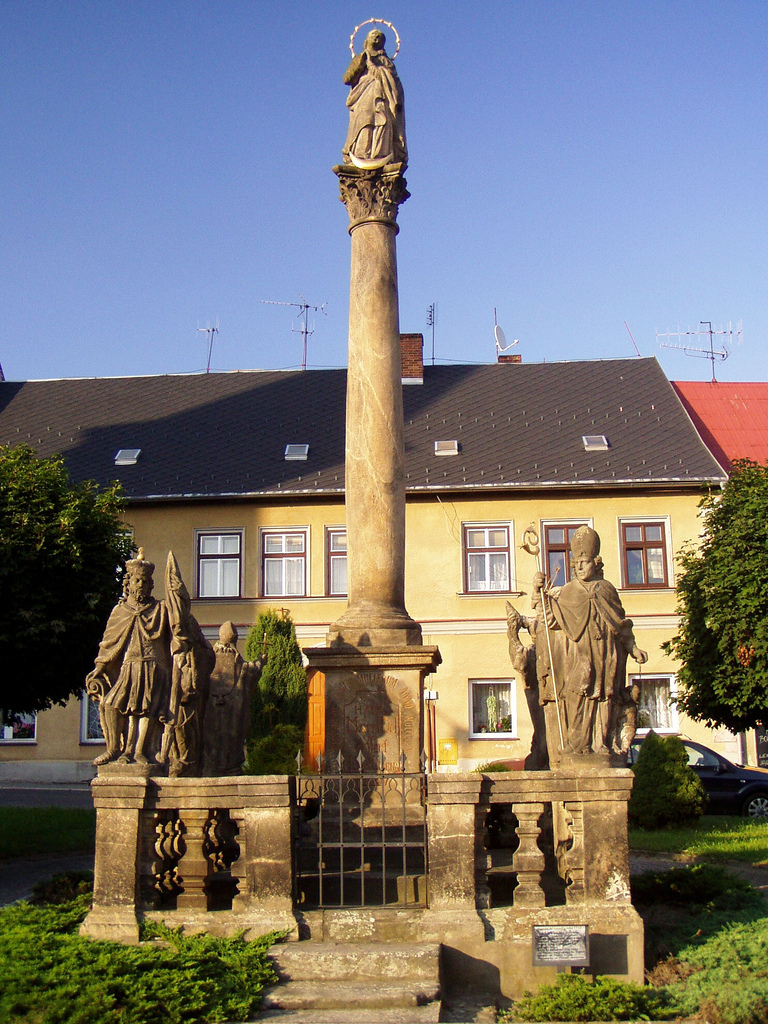
Marian column

The I/35 expressway (part of the European route E442) runs through the town.

Hodkovice nad Mohelkou is located on the railway line Liberec–Jaroměř.

Hodkovice nad Mohelkou Airport (ICAO code: LKHD) is a public domestic airport, one of three airports serving the Liberec Region.

== Education ==
There are two schools in Hodkovice nad Mohelkou, a kindergarten and a primary school. The town founds both organisations.

== Sights ==
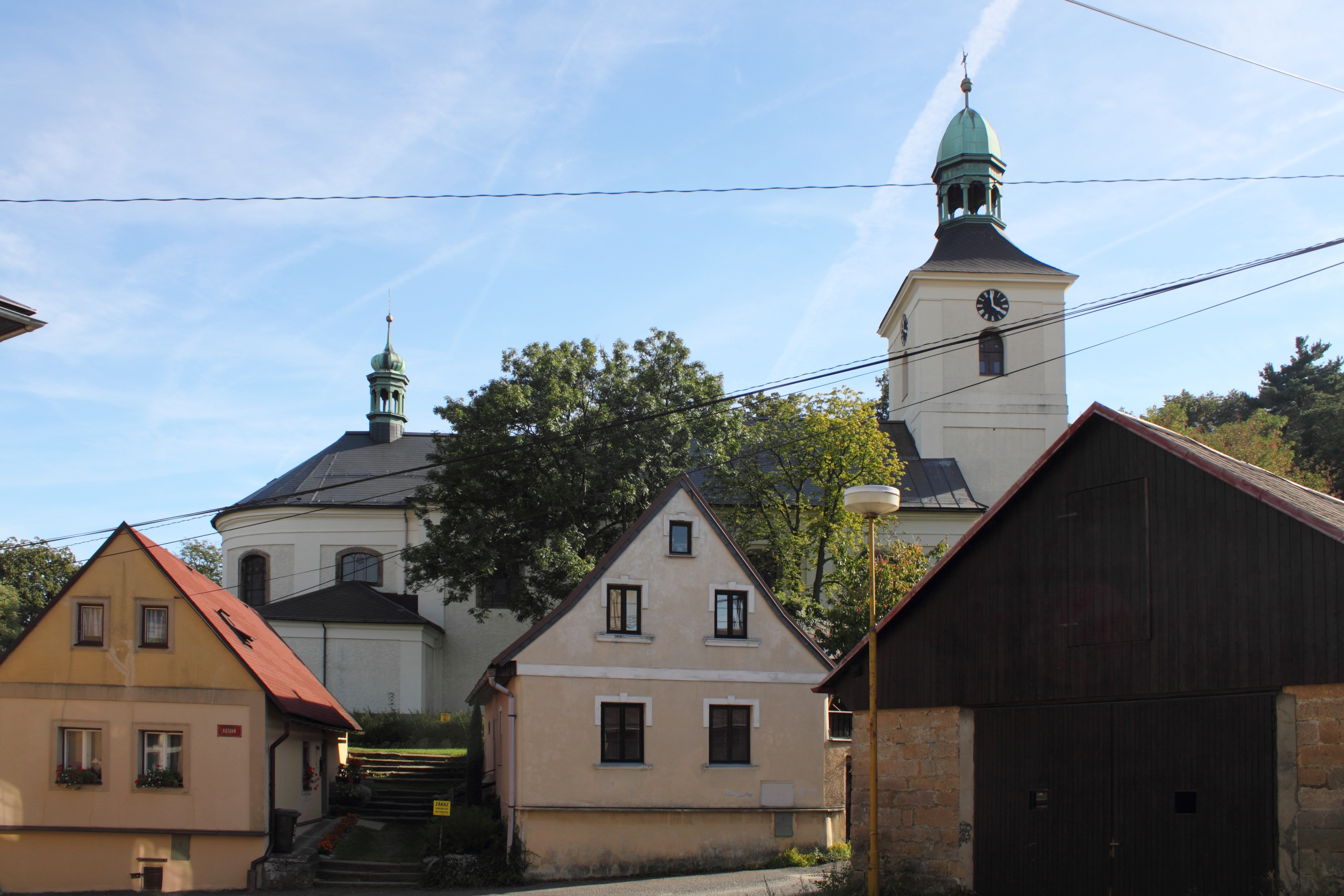
Church of Saint Procopius

The historic town centre consists of many Neoclassical houses, built after the fire in 1806, and is protected as an urban monument zone. The main landmark of the town square is the town hall. It was built in 1811, after the previous building burned down. In 1889, it was rebuilt to its current appearance. Other valuable buildings on the square are a Marian column from the early 18th century, and a fountain from 1886, which was removed from the square in 1946 and returned in the 1990s.

The Church of Saint Procopius was built in 1717 on the site of a wooden church, which was destroyed by a fire in 1692.

== Twin towns – sister cities ==
Hodkovice nad Mohelkou is twinned with:

- Węgliniec, Poland
