= Domousnice =

- Municipality
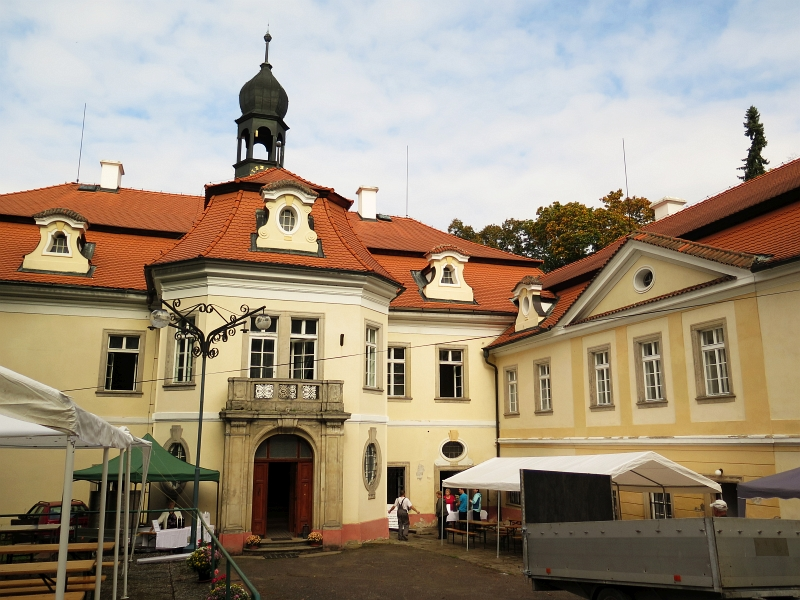
- Domousnice Castle

- Location in the Czech Republic
- Coordinates: 50°23′39″N 15°6′6″E
- Country: Czech Republic
- Region: Central Bohemian
- District: Mladá Boleslav
- First mentioned: 1290

Area
  - Total: 9.31 km^{2} (3.59 sq mi)
- Elevation: 270 m (890 ft)

Population (2026-01-01)
  - Total: 307
  - Density: 33.0/km^{2} (85.4/sq mi)
- Time zone: UTC+1 (CET)
  - Summer (DST): UTC+2 (CEST)
- Postal codes: 294 04, 294 48
- Website: domousnice.cz

Domousnice is a municipality and village in Mladá Boleslav District in the Central Bohemian Region of the Czech Republic. It has about 300 inhabitants.

== Administrative division ==
Domousnice consists of two municipal parts (in brackets population according to the 2021 census):

- Domousnice (234)
- Skyšice (54)

Skyšice forms an exclave of the municipal territory.

== Etymology ==
The initial name of the village was Domahostice and was derived from the personal name Domahost, meaning "the village of Domahost's people". Gradually, the name was distorted into its current form.

== Geography ==
Domousnice is located about 13 kilometres (8 mi) east of Mladá Boleslav and 52 km (32 mi) northeast of Prague. It lies in the Jičín Uplands. The highest point is at 375 m (1,230 ft) above sea level. The stream Hasinský potok flows through the municipality and supplies a fishpond in the centre of Domousnice.

== History ==
The first written mention of Domousnice is from 1290. It was a small estate owned by various less important noble families.

== Demographics ==
Historical population

Year	Pop.	±%
1869	794	—
1880	692	−12.8%
1890	674	−2.6%
1900	633	−6.1%
1910	612	−3.3%

Year	Pop.	±%
1921	640	+4.6%
1930	602	−5.9%
1950	454	−24.6%
1961	429	−5.5%
1970	393	−8.4%

Year	Pop.	±%
1980	309	−21.4%
1991	231	−25.2%
2001	234	+1.3%
2011	258	+10.3%
2021	288	+11.6%

Source: Censuses

== Transport ==
There are no major roads passing through the municipality. The railway that runs through the municipality is unused.

== Sights ==
The main landmark of Domousnice is the Domousnice Castle. It was built in the Baroque style in the mid-18th century and modified in the 20th century. It is surrounded by a park.
