= Kobyly (Liberec District) =

- Municipality
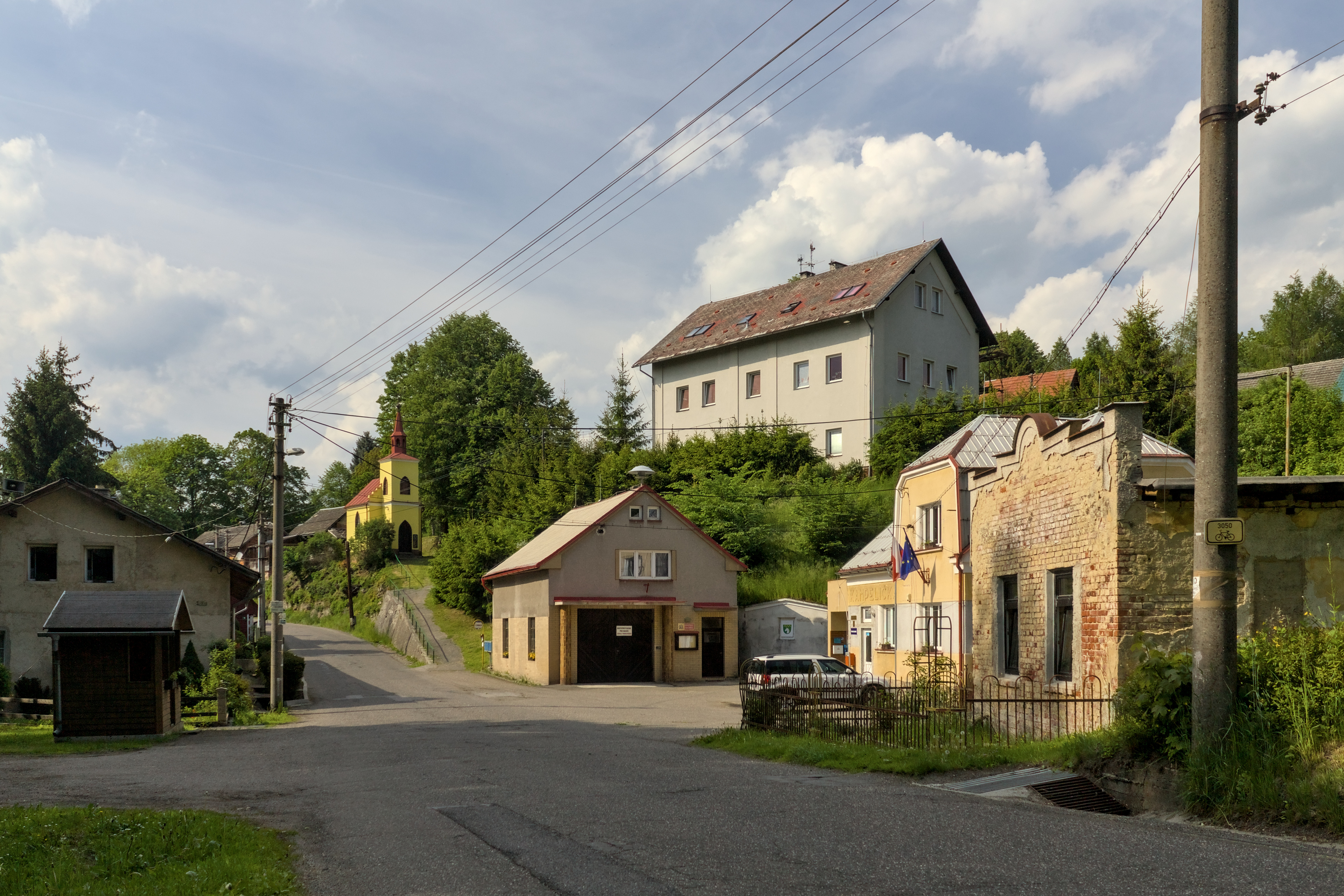
- Centre of Kobyly

- Flag Coat of arms

- Location in the Czech Republic
- Coordinates: 50°50′59″N 15°5′2″E
- Country: Czech Republic
- Region: Liberec
- District: Liberec
- First mentioned: 1239

Area
  - Total: 8.27 km^{2} (3.19 sq mi)
- Elevation: 325 m (1,066 ft)

Population (2026-01-01)
  - Total: 381
  - Density: 46.1/km^{2} (119/sq mi)
- Time zone: UTC+1 (CET)
  - Summer (DST): UTC+2 (CEST)
- Postal codes: 463 43, 463 45
- Website: www.kobyly-obec.cz

Kobyly (German: Kobil) is a municipality and village in Liberec District in the Liberec Region of the Czech Republic. It has about 400 inhabitants.

== Administrative division ==
Kobyly consists of seven municipal parts (in brackets population according to the 2021 census):

- Kobyly (111)
- Havlovice (146)
- Janovice (6)
- Podhora (23)
- Radvanice (19)
- Sedlisko (16)
- Vorklebice (33)

== Etymology ==
The name is derived from the personal name Kobyla, meaning "the village of Kobylas (Kobyla's family)".

== Geography ==
Kobyly is located about 16 kilometres (10 mi) south of Liberec. It lies in the Jičín Uplands. The highest point is at 399 m (1,309 ft) above sea level. The Mohelka River flows through the western part of the municipality.

== History ==
The first written mention of Kobyly is from 1239.

== Demographics ==
Historical population

Year	Pop.	±%
1869	778	—
1880	770	−1.0%
1890	774	+0.5%
1900	731	−5.6%
1910	757	+3.6%

Year	Pop.	±%
1921	727	−4.0%
1930	634	−12.8%
1950	410	−35.3%
1961	413	+0.7%
1970	371	−10.2%

Year	Pop.	±%
1980	354	−4.6%
1991	293	−17.2%
2001	280	−4.4%
2011	324	+15.7%
2021	354	+9.3%

Source: Censuses

== Transport ==
There are no railways or major roads passing through the municipality.

== Sights ==
Among the architecturally valuable buildings are the Chapel of Saint Wenceslaus in Kobyly from 1900 and the Chapel of Saint Gall in Havlovice from 1888.
