= Sychrov =

Sychrov may refer to places in the Czech Republic:

- Sychrov (Liberec District), a municipality and village in the Liberec Region
  - Sychrov Castle, a castle in the municipality
- Sychrov, a village and part of Borotín (Tábor District) in the South Bohemian Region
- Sychrov, a village and part of Hostouň (Domažlice District) in the Plzeň Region
- Sychrov, a village and part of Kozlov (Havlíčkův Brod District) in the Vysočina Region
- Sychrov, a village and part of Mnichovo Hradiště in the Central Bohemian Region
- Sychrov, a village and part of Rosovice in the Central Bohemian Region
