= Mohelka =

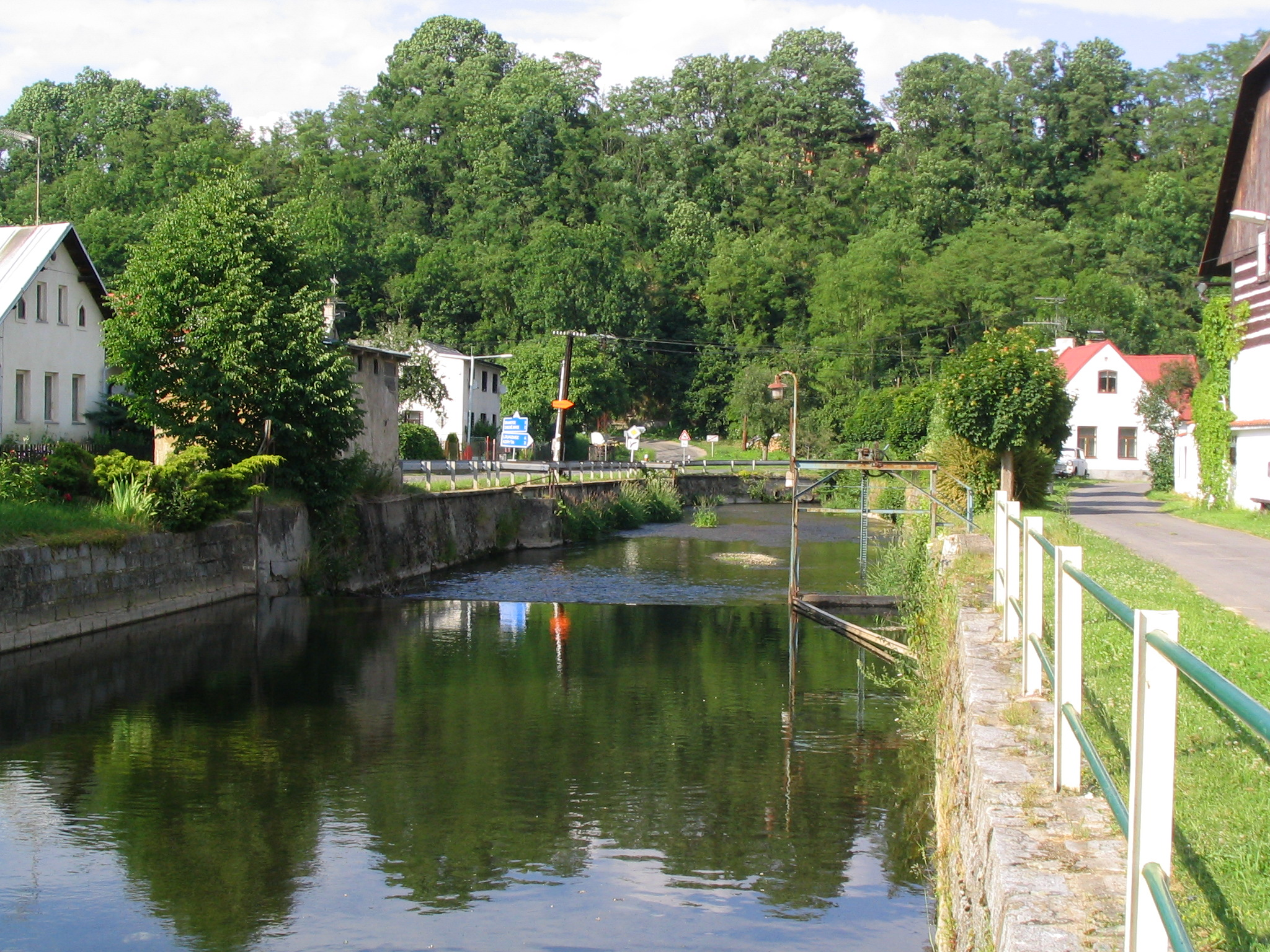
- The Mohelka in Mohelnice nad Jizerou

Location
- Country: Czech Republic
- Regions: Liberec; Central Bohemian

Physical characteristics
- Source
  - location: Jablonec nad Nisou, Jizera Mountains
  - coordinates: 50°42′30″N 15°11′18″E
  - elevation: 608 m (1,995 ft)
- Mouth
  - location: Jizera
  - coordinates: 50°33′27″N 14°58′49″E
  - elevation: 220 m (720 ft)
- Length: 41.6 km (25.8 mi)
- Basin size: 176.5 km^{2} (68.1 sq mi)
- Discharge
  - average: 1.82 m^{3}/s (64 cu ft/s) near estuary

Basin features
- Progression: Jizera→ Elbe→ North Sea

The Mohelka is a river in the Czech Republic, a right tributary of the Jizera River. It flows through the Liberec and Central Bohemian regions. It is 41.6 km (25.8 mi) long.

== Etymology ==
The river was initially called Mohelnice. The name of the river was derived from the Czech word mohyla (i.e. 'mound', but formerly also 'hill'; so the word mohelnice meant "water flowing between hills"). Mohelka is a diminutive form of Mohelnice.

== Characteristic ==
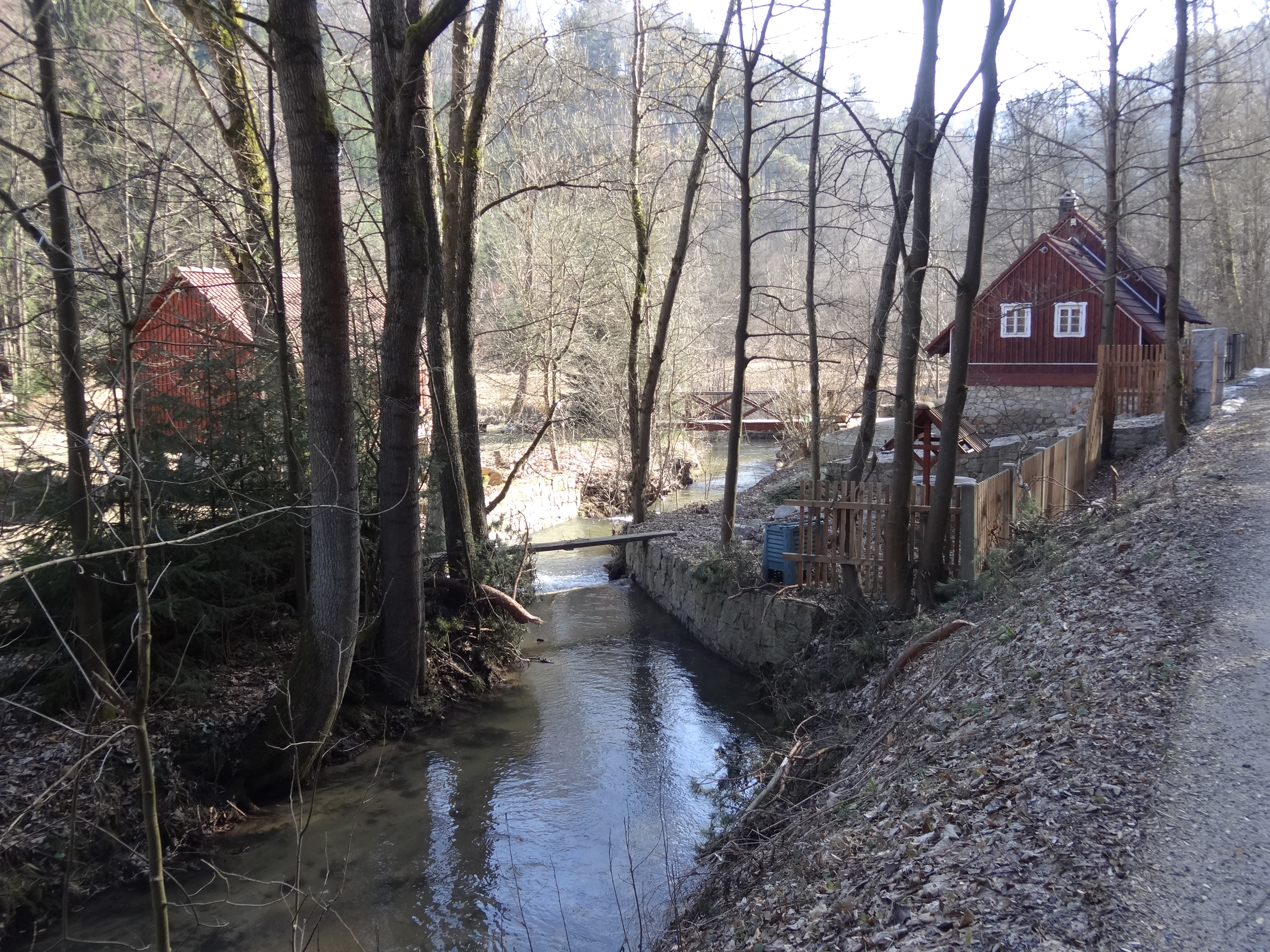
The Kamenice near Bílá-Dehtáry

The Mohelka originates in the territory of Jablonec nad Nisou in the Jizera Mountains at an elevation of 608 m (1,995 ft) and flows to Mohelnice nad Jizerou, where it enters the Jizera River at an elevation of 220 m (720 ft). It is 41.6 km (25.8 mi) long. Its drainage basin has an area of 176.5 km^{2} (68.1 sq mi). The average discharge at its mouth is 1.82 m^{3}/s (64 cu ft/s).

The longest tributaries of the Mohelka are:

Tributary	Length (km)	Side
Ještědka	13.3	right
Malá Mohelka	12.8	right
Oharka	9.0	right

== Course ==
The river flows through the municipal territories of Jablonec nad Nisou, Pulečný, Rychnov u Jablonce nad Nisou, Rádlo, Hodkovice nad Mohelkou, Žďárek, Paceřice, Sychrov, Radimovice, Vlastibořice, Bílá, Český Dub, Všelibice, Kobyly, Chocnějovice and Mohelnice nad Jizerou.

== Bodies of water ==
There are 102 bodies of water in the basin area, but none of them is notable and their total area is only 7.3 ha (18 acres).

== Tourism ==
The Mohelka is suitable for river tourism. About 15 km (9 mi) on the lower course of the river is navigable for paddlers all year round.

== See also ==
- List of rivers of the Czech Republic
