= Sychrov (Liberec District) =

- Municipality
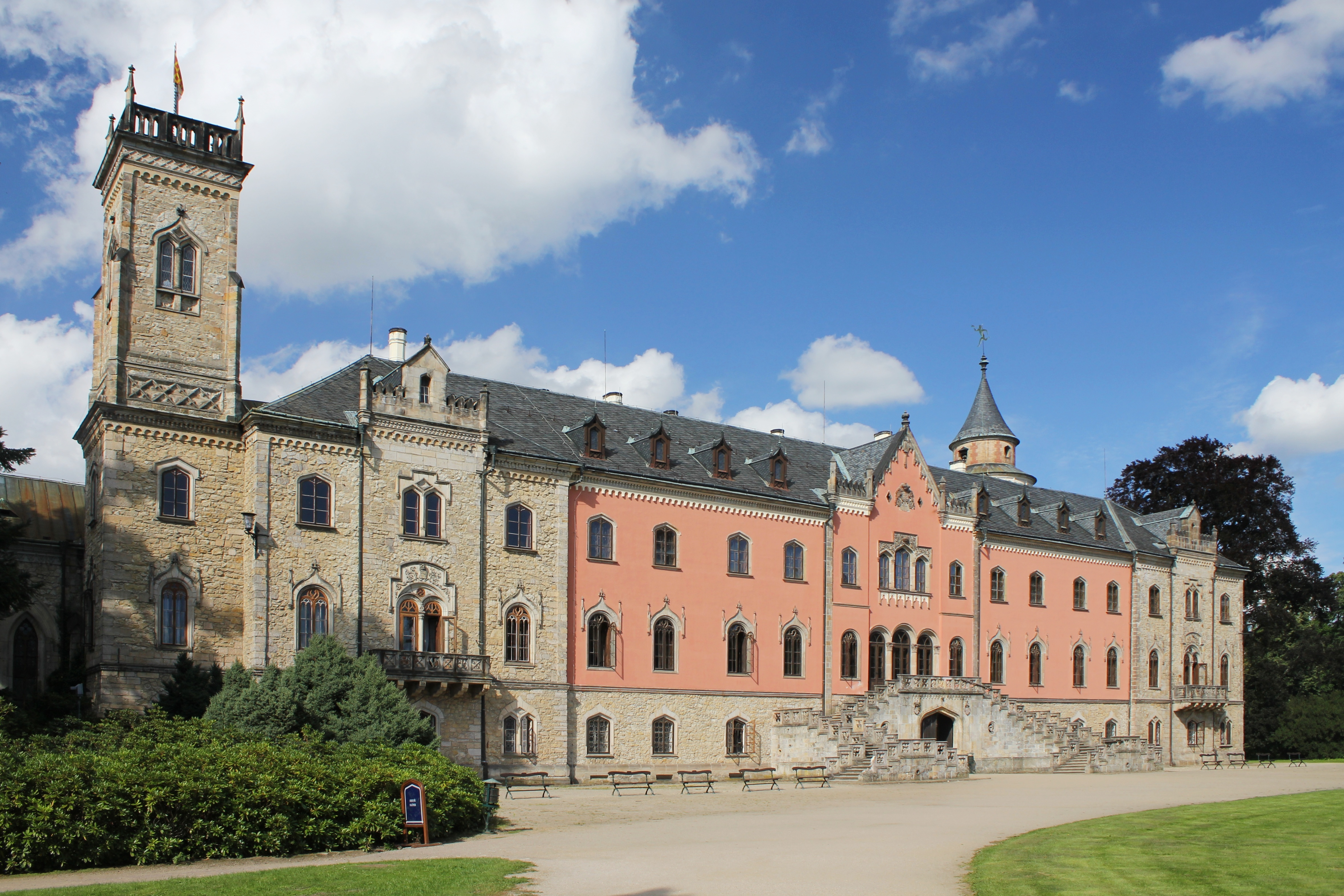
- Sychrov Castle

- Flag Coat of arms

- Location in the Czech Republic
- Coordinates: 50°37′33″N 15°5′22″E
- Country: Czech Republic
- Region: Liberec
- District: Liberec
- First mentioned: 1367

Area
  - Total: 6.51 km^{2} (2.51 sq mi)
- Elevation: 384 m (1,260 ft)

Population (2026-01-01)
  - Total: 223
  - Density: 34.3/km^{2} (88.7/sq mi)
- Time zone: UTC+1 (CET)
  - Summer (DST): UTC+2 (CEST)
- Postal code: 463 44
- Website: www.obecsychrov.cz

Sychrov (German: Sichrow) is a municipality and village in Liberec District in the Liberec Region of the Czech Republic. It has about 200 inhabitants. It is known for the Sychrov Castle.

== Administrative division ==
Sychrov consists of five municipal parts (in brackets population according to the 2021 census):

- Sychrov (27)
- Radostín (55)
- Sedlejovice (72)
- Třtí (33)
- Vrchovina (48)

== Etymology ==
The name Sychrov is derived from the surname Sychra, meaning "Sychra's (court)".

== Geography ==
Sychrov is located about 14 kilometres (9 mi) south of Liberec. It lies in the Jičín Uplands. The highest point is at 442 m (1,450 ft) above sea level. The Mohelka River flows through the municipality. The village of Sychrov is urbanistically fused with neighbouring Radimovice.

== History ==
The first written mention of Sychrov (under the name Svojkov) is from 1367. A fort was first documented in the 15th century. In the 17th century, the village disappeared and the fort was replaced by a small Baroque castle named Sychrov, which was built in 1690–1693. The newly established village got its name after the castle. The Sychrov Castle was reconstructed in the Empire style and expanded in 1834.

== Demographics ==
Historical population

Year	Pop.	±%
1869	722	—
1880	687	−4.8%
1890	689	+0.3%
1900	729	+5.8%
1910	671	−8.0%

Year	Pop.	±%
1921	600	−10.6%
1930	676	+12.7%
1950	491	−27.4%
1961	392	−20.2%
1970	305	−22.2%

Year	Pop.	±%
1980	261	−14.4%
1991	170	−34.9%
2001	174	+2.4%
2011	197	+13.2%
2021	235	+19.3%

Source: Censuses

== Transport ==
The railway line Liberec–Jaroměř passes through the municipality. However, the train station called Sychrov is located in the territory of neighbouring Radimovice.

== Sights ==
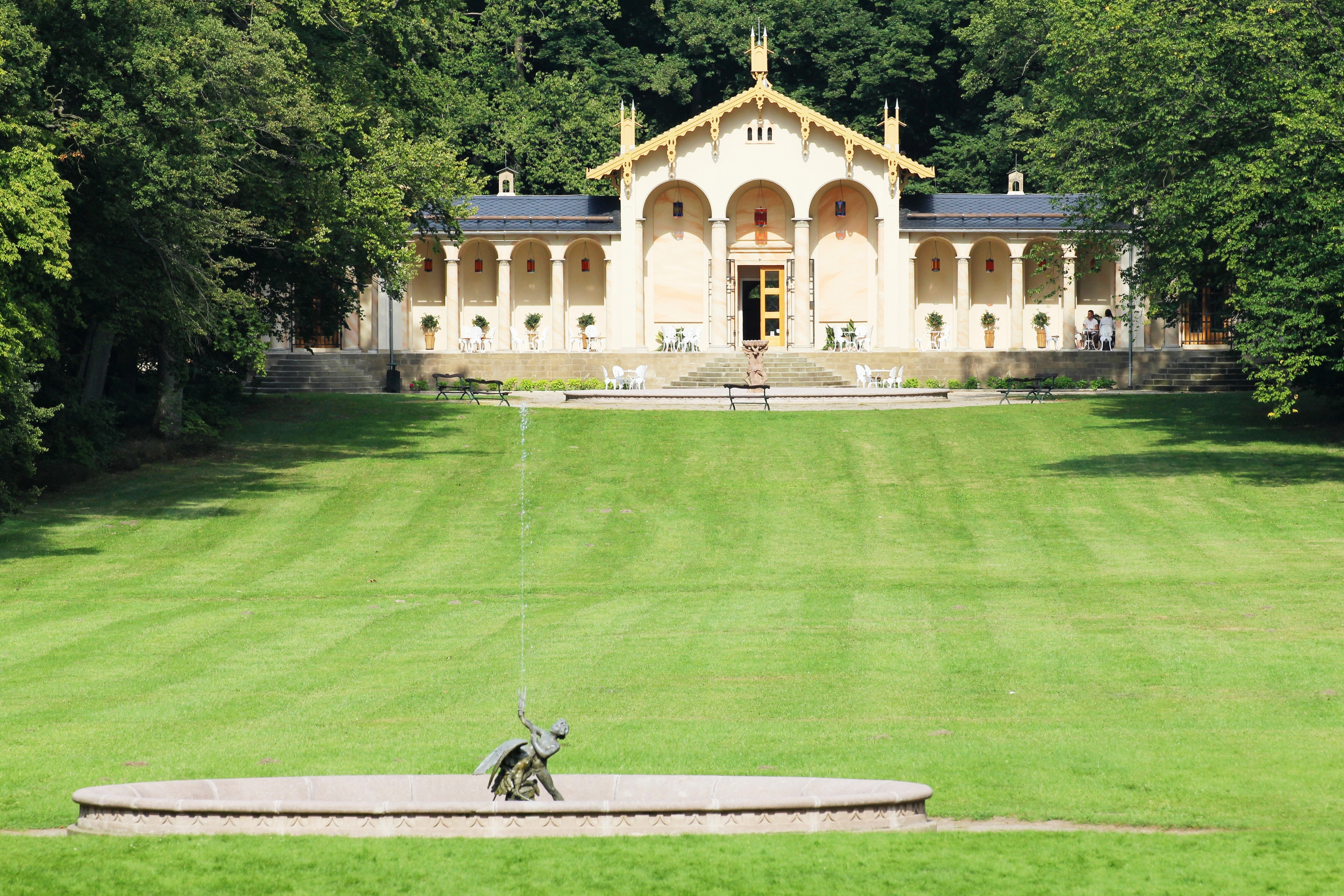
Orangery in the castle park

Sychrov is known for the Sychrov Castle. It gained its present appearance between 1847 and 1862, when it was rebuilt in the romantic neo-Gothic style. Today, the castle is open to the public and offers guided tours.

The castle complex includes a 26 ha (64 acres) large English-style park with an orangery. The park was gradually established between 1820 and 1855.
