= Mohelnice nad Jizerou =

- Municipality
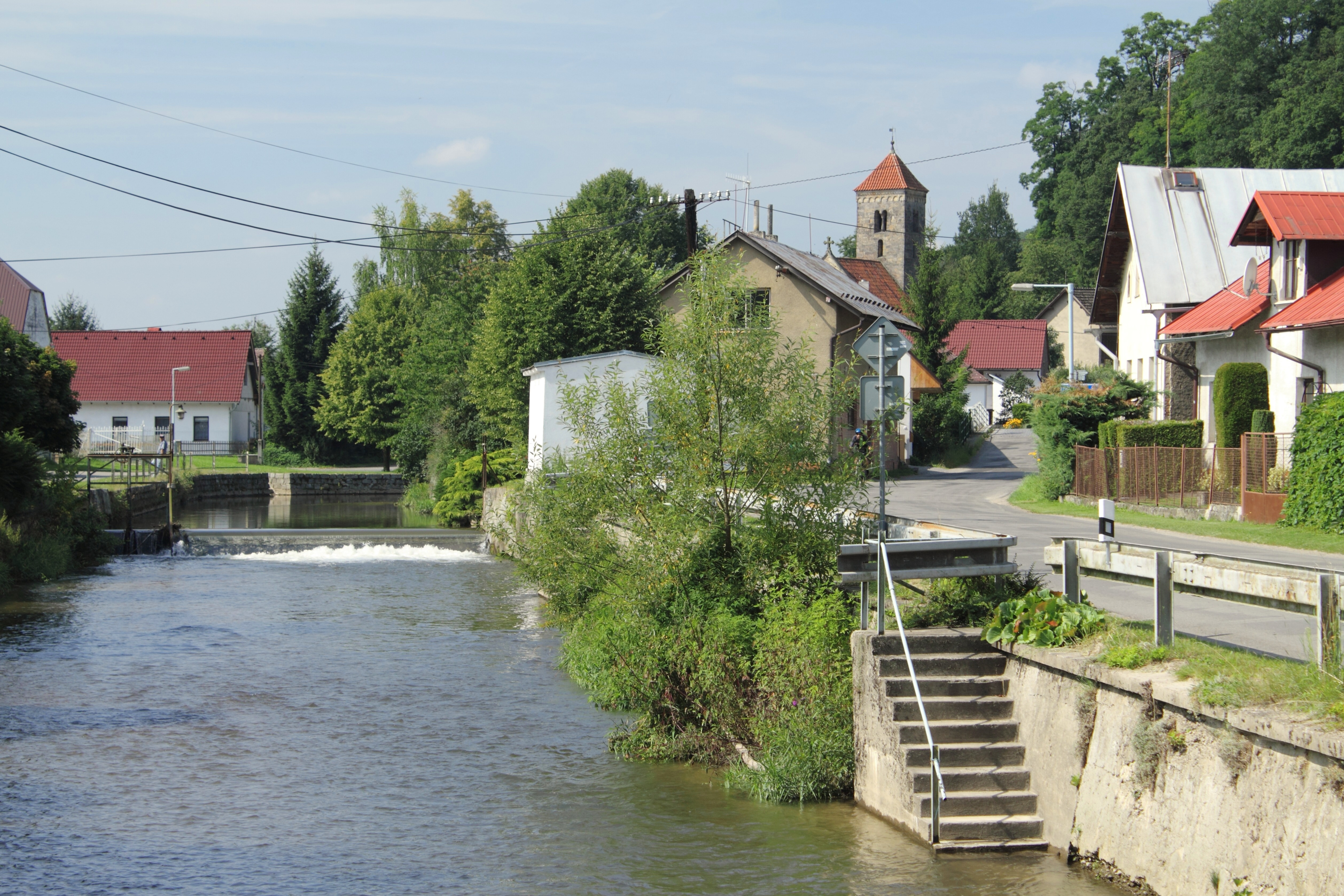
- Centre of Mohelnice nad Jizerou

- Location in the Czech Republic
- Coordinates: 50°33′35″N 14°58′39″E
- Country: Czech Republic
- Region: Central Bohemian
- District: Mladá Boleslav
- First mentioned: 1352

Area
  - Total: 2.68 km^{2} (1.03 sq mi)
- Elevation: 232 m (761 ft)

Population (2026-01-01)
  - Total: 93
  - Density: 35/km^{2} (90/sq mi)
- Time zone: UTC+1 (CET)
  - Summer (DST): UTC+2 (CEST)
- Postal code: 294 13
- Website: www.mohelnice-nad-jizerou.cz

Mohelnice nad Jizerou is a municipality and village in Mladá Boleslav District in the Central Bohemian Region of the Czech Republic. It has about 90 inhabitants.

== Administrative division ==
Mohelnice nad Jizerou consists of two municipal parts (in brackets population according to the 2021 census):

- Mohelnice nad Jizerou (76)
- Podhora (19)

== Etymology ==
The name was derived from the name of the Mohelka river, which was initially called Mohelnice. The name of the river was derived from the word mohyla (i.e. 'mound', but formerly also 'hill'; so the word mohelnice meant "water flowing between hills").

== Geography ==
Mohelnice nad Jizerou is located about 15 kilometres (9 mi) north of Mladá Boleslav and 60 km (37 mi) northeast of Prague. It lies on the border between the Jičín Uplands and Jizera Table. The highest point is at 328 m (1,076 ft) above sea level. The municipality is situated at the confluence of the Jizera and Mohelka rivers.

== History ==
The first written mention of Mohelnice nad Jizerou is from 1352.

== Demographics ==
Historical population

Year	Pop.	±%
1869	388	—
1880	261	−32.7%
1890	270	+3.4%
1900	233	−13.7%
1910	279	+19.7%

Year	Pop.	±%
1921	288	+3.2%
1930	247	−14.2%
1950	153	−38.1%
1961	175	+14.4%
1970	144	−17.7%

Year	Pop.	±%
1980	109	−24.3%
1991	81	−25.7%
2001	77	−4.9%
2011	89	+15.6%
2021	95	+6.7%

Source: Censuses

== Transport ==
There are no railways or major roads passing through the municipality.

== Sights ==
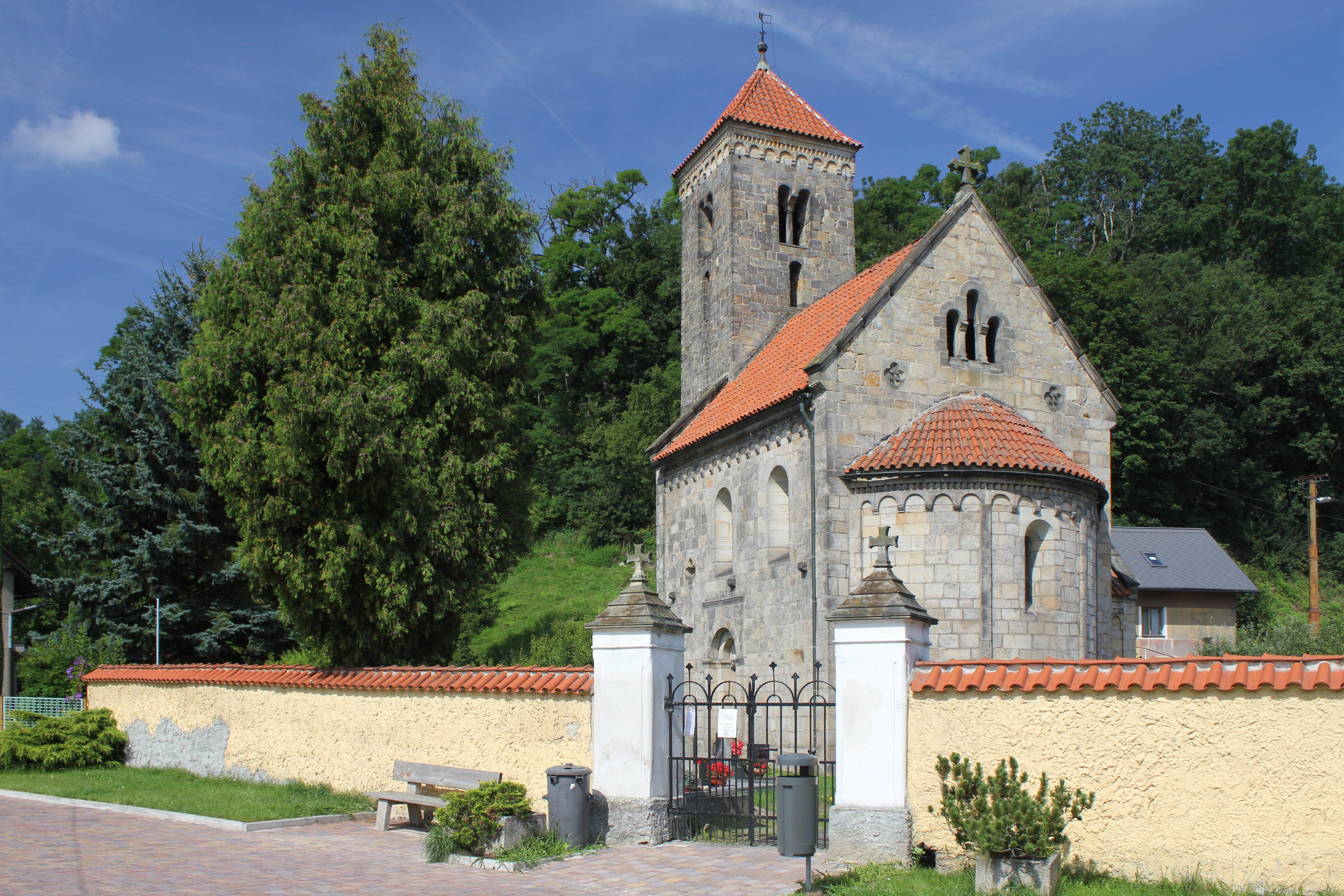
Church of the Assumption of the Virgin Mary

The main landmark of Mohelnice nad Jizerou is the Church of the Assumption of the Virgin Mary. It is a tribune church, built in the Romanesque style in the mid-12th century.
