= Český Dub =

- Town
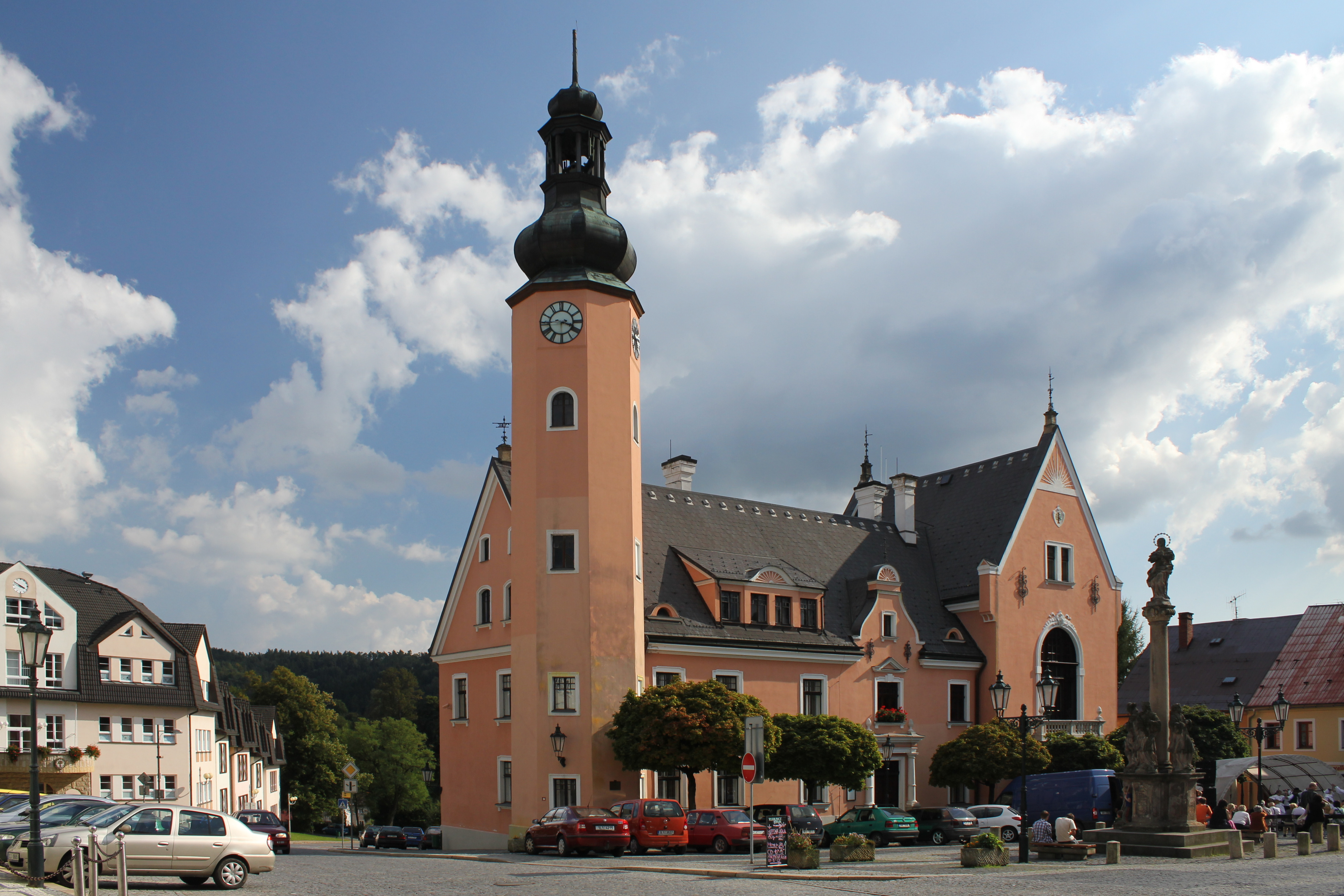
- Town hall

- Flag Coat of arms

- Location in the Czech Republic
- Coordinates: 50°39′38″N 14°59′47″E
- Country: Czech Republic
- Region: Liberec
- District: Liberec
- First mentioned: 1115

Government
  - Mayor: Jiří Miler

Area
  - Total: 22.57 km^{2} (8.71 sq mi)
- Elevation: 325 m (1,066 ft)

Population (2026-01-01)
  - Total: 2,901
  - Density: 128.5/km^{2} (332.9/sq mi)
- Time zone: UTC+1 (CET)
  - Summer (DST): UTC+2 (CEST)
- Postal code: 463 43
- Website: www.cdub.cz

Český Dub (Czech pronunciation: [ˈtʃɛskiː ˈdup]; German: Böhmisch Aicha) is a town in Liberec District in the Liberec Region of the Czech Republic. It has about 2,900 inhabitants. The historic town centre is well preserved and is protected as an urban monument zone.

== Administrative division ==
Český Dub consists of 15 municipal parts (in brackets population according to the 2021 census):

- Český Dub I (215)
- Český Dub II (360)
- Český Dub III (290)
- Český Dub IV (1,057)
- Bohumileč (22)
- Hoření Starý Dub (61)
- Kněžičky (168)
- Libíč (34)
- Loukovičky (53)
- Malý Dub (33)
- Modlibohov (60)
- Smržov (103)
- Sobákov (30)
- Sobotice (125)
- Starý Dub (141)

== Etymology ==
The name literally means 'Bohemian oak' in Czech.

== Geography ==
Český Dub is located about 11 kilometres (7 mi) south of Liberec. The southeastern part of the municipal territory with the town proper lies in the Jičín Uplands and the northwestern part lies in the Ralsko Uplands. The highest point is a nameless hill at 494 m (1,621 ft) above sea level. The town is situated at the confluence of the Ještědka and Rašovka streams. The Ještědka then heads to the Mohelka River, which flows through the southern part of the municipal territory.

== History ==
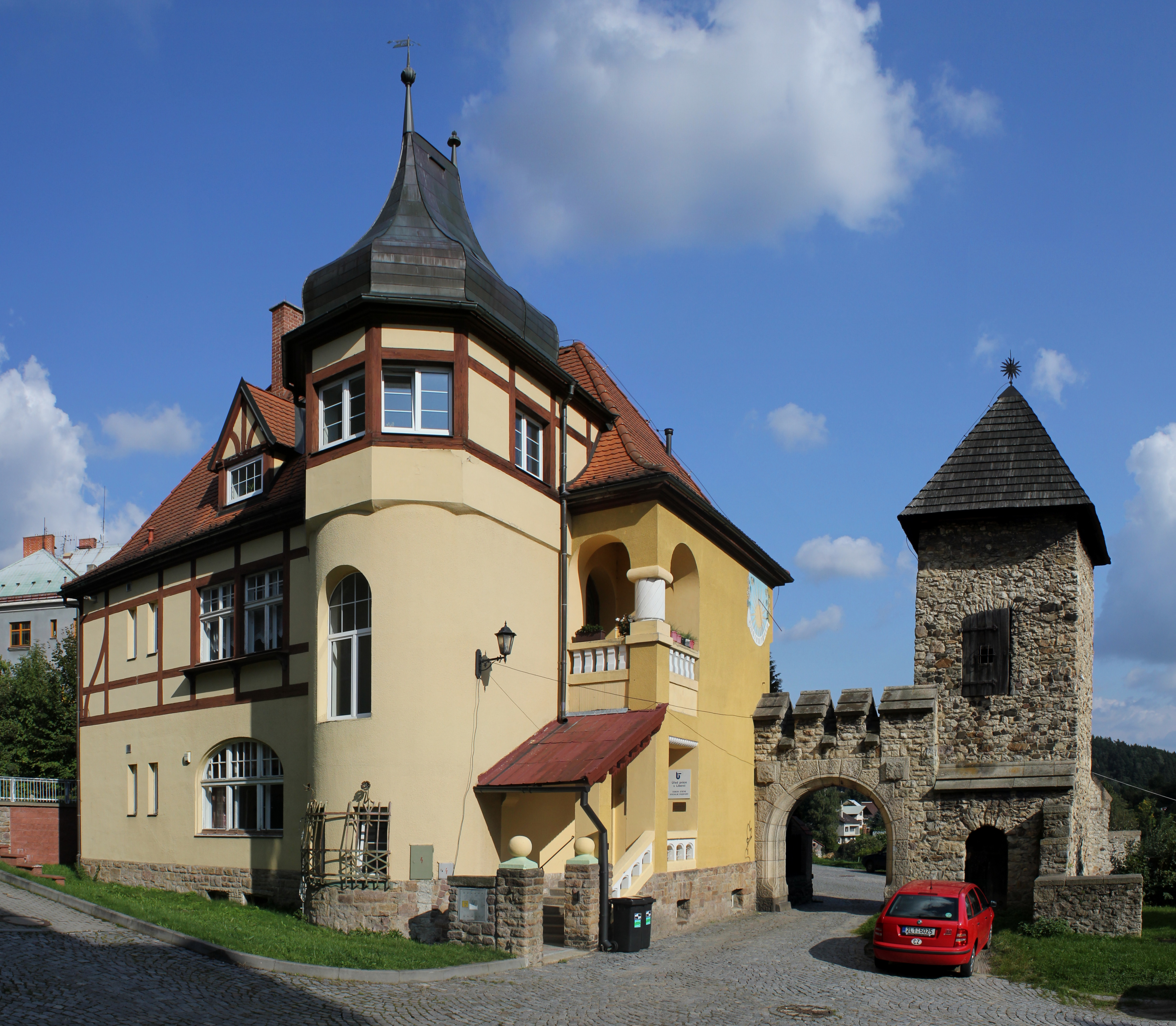
Remains of the town fortifications

Český Dub belongs to the oldest settlements in North Bohemia. The first written mention of Český Dub is from 1115. It was founded as a market settlement on a trade route, on an elevated spot between small rivers of Ještědka and Rašovka. In 1237, Český Dub became a property of Havel of Markvartice. He had built here a fortified monastery for the Order of Knights Hospitaller with the Chapel of Saint John the Baptist. In the mid-15th century, the town was destroyed by fires and by the Lusatian army. Jan of Vartenberg had rebuilt the town in 1490.

In 1552, the monastery and the late Gothic castle were rebuilt to a representative Renaissance castle. The castle burned down in 1858. In the middle of the 19th century, the town became a centre of the textile industry thanks to the entrepreneur Franz von Schmitt. He also had built a Neo-Renaissance castle in the town.

== Demographics ==
Historical population

Year	Pop.	±%
1869	5,004	—
1880	5,081	+1.5%
1890	5,138	+1.1%
1900	5,188	+1.0%
1910	5,155	−0.6%

Year	Pop.	±%
1921	4,263	−17.3%
1930	3,984	−6.5%
1950	2,565	−35.6%
1961	2,851	+11.2%
1970	2,987	+4.8%

Year	Pop.	±%
1980	2,952	−1.2%
1991	2,904	−1.6%
2001	2,847	−2.0%
2011	2,806	−1.4%
2021	2,752	−1.9%

Source: Censuses

== Transport ==
Český Dub is located at the intersection of two second-class roads. There are no railways or major roads passing through the town.

== Sights ==
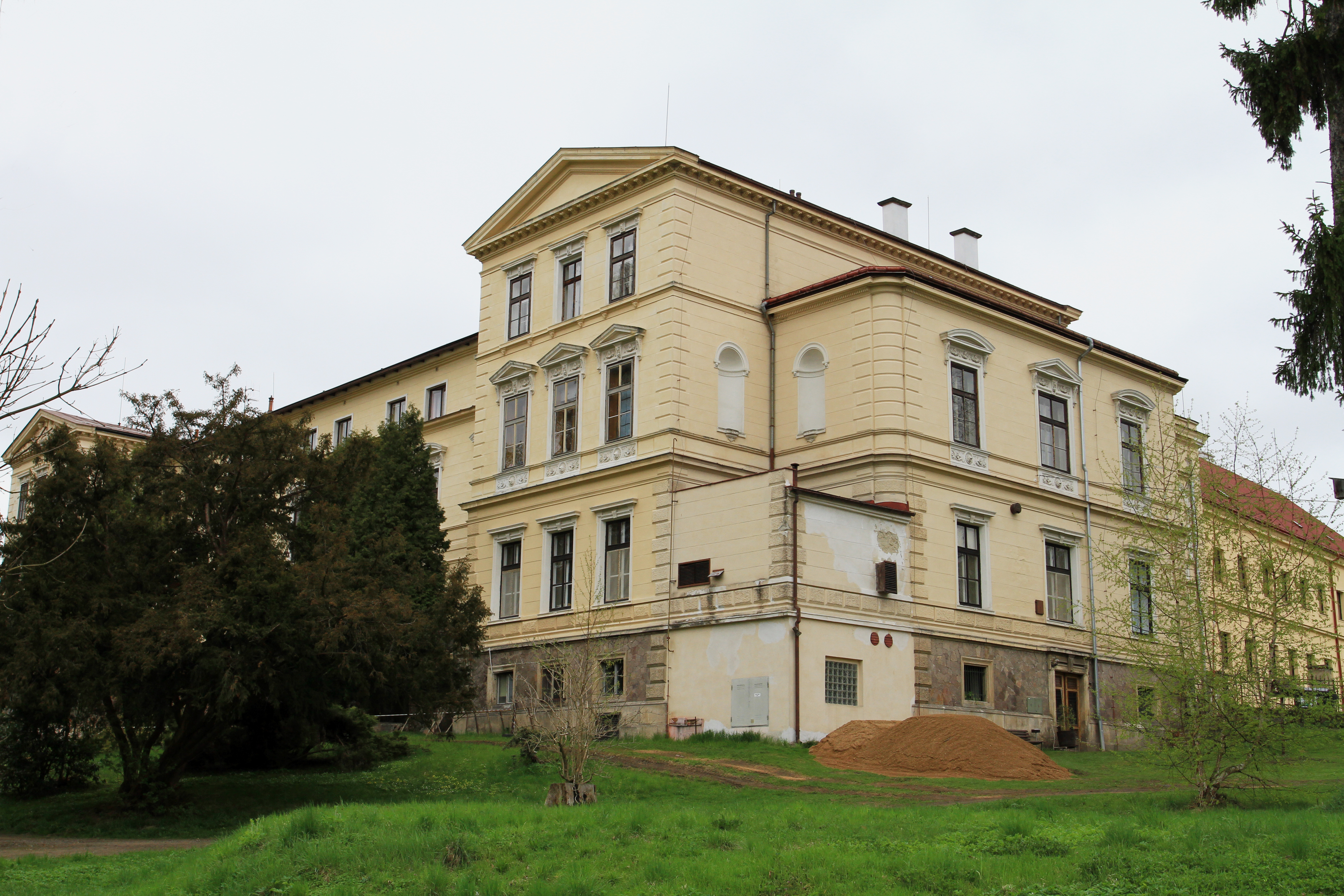
Schmitt's Villa

The Church of the Sending of the Holy Spirit was originally a Gothic church, built after 1237 and first documented in 1291. It was rebuilt into its current Baroque form in 1694–1695.

The Church of the Holy Trinity is an early Baroque cemetery church. It dates from the late 17th century.

Schmitt's Villa is a notable Neo-Renaissance house. It was built for in 1873–1874 and looks like a castle, for that reason it is sometimes called a Schmitt's Castle. Today the buildings serves as an institute of social services. Its English landscape garden is open to the public.

The regional Podještědské Museum was founded in 1919 and since 1945 has been located in Blaschko's Villa. It is a valuable Neorenaissance house, built in 1880–1881, decorated in the style of historicist Art Nouveau. It was built by Franz von Schmitt for his daughter and her husband. The museum also includes exposed underground remains of the Knights Hospitaller monastery.

There are several fragments of the town fortifications in Český Dub. The town walls were built probably in the 13th century, but the oldest surviving document mentioning their existence dates is from 1512.
