= Radimovice (Liberec District) =

- Municipality
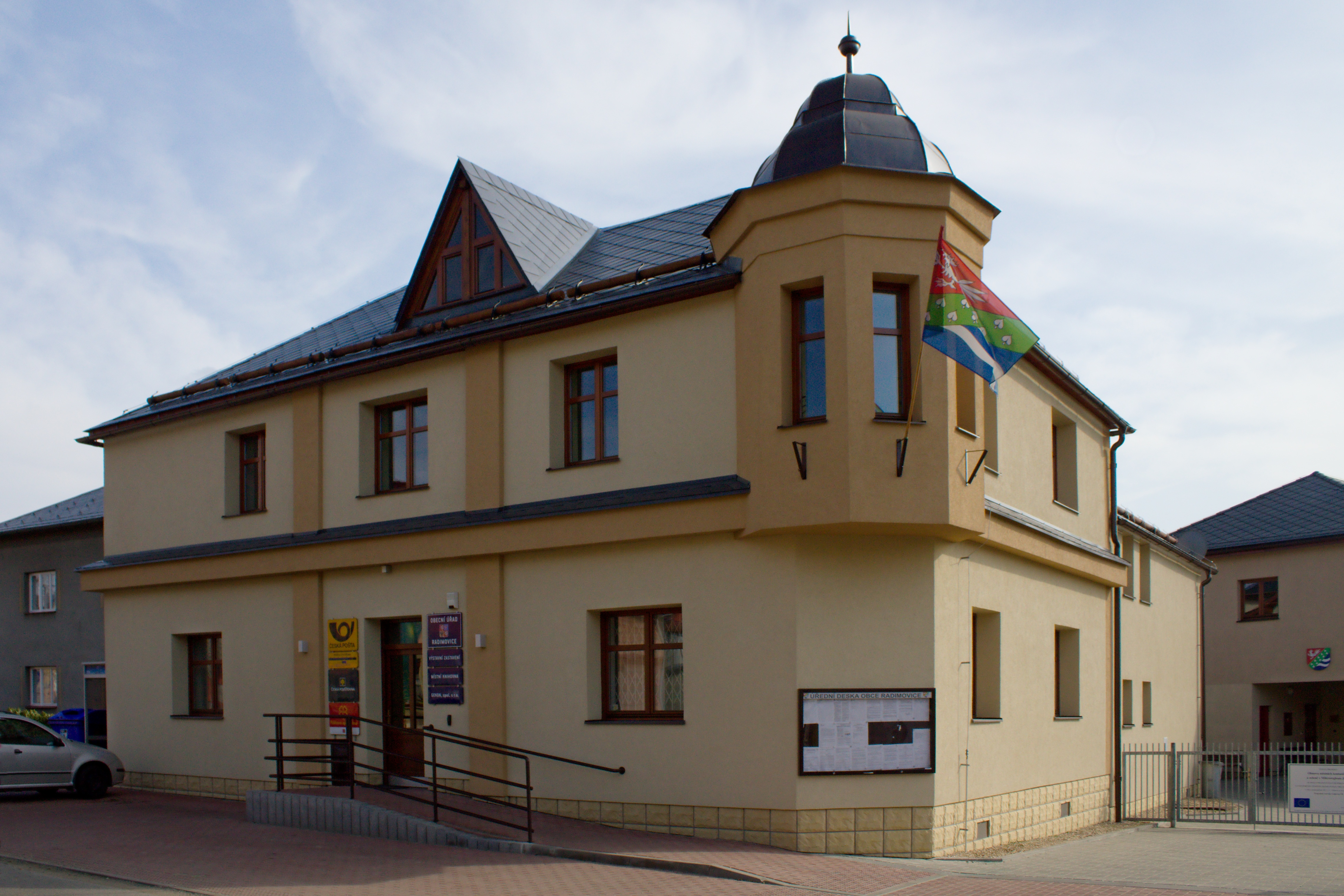
- Municipal office

- Flag Coat of arms

- Location in the Czech Republic
- Coordinates: 50°37′35″N 15°4′56″E
- Country: Czech Republic
- Region: Liberec
- District: Liberec
- First mentioned: 1543

Area
  - Total: 1.33 km^{2} (0.51 sq mi)
- Elevation: 377 m (1,237 ft)

Population (2026-01-01)
  - Total: 360
  - Density: 270/km^{2} (700/sq mi)
- Time zone: UTC+1 (CET)
  - Summer (DST): UTC+2 (CEST)
- Postal code: 463 44
- Website: radimovice.cz

Radimovice (German: Radimowitz) is a municipality and village in Liberec District in the Liberec Region of the Czech Republic. It has about 400 inhabitants.

== Geography ==
Radimovice is located about 14 kilometres (9 mi) south of Liberec. It lies in the Jičín Uplands. The Mohelka River flows along the northern municipal border. The village is urbanistically fused with neighbouring Sychrov.

== Demographics ==
Historical population
Year	Pop.	±%
1869	190	—
1880	160	−15.8%
1890	187	+16.9%
1900	208	+11.2%
1910	227	+9.1%
1921	231	+1.8%
1930	374	+61.9%
1950	307	−17.9%
1961	287	−6.5%
1970	251	−12.5%
1980	211	−15.9%
1991	216	+2.4%
2001	226	+4.6%
2011	286	+26.5%
2021	395	+38.1%
Source: Censuses
