= Sychra =

Sychra (feminine: Sychrová) is a Czech surname, derived from the adjective sychravý ('bleak'). Notable people with the surname include:

- Jan Sychra (born 1969), Czech sport shooter
- Andrei Sychra (c. 1773 – 1850), Russian guitarist and composer

== See also ==
- Sychrov (disambiguation)
