= Sychrov Castle =

1690s castle in the Czech Republic

- Zámek Sychrov
- Sychrov, Liberec Region, Czech Republic
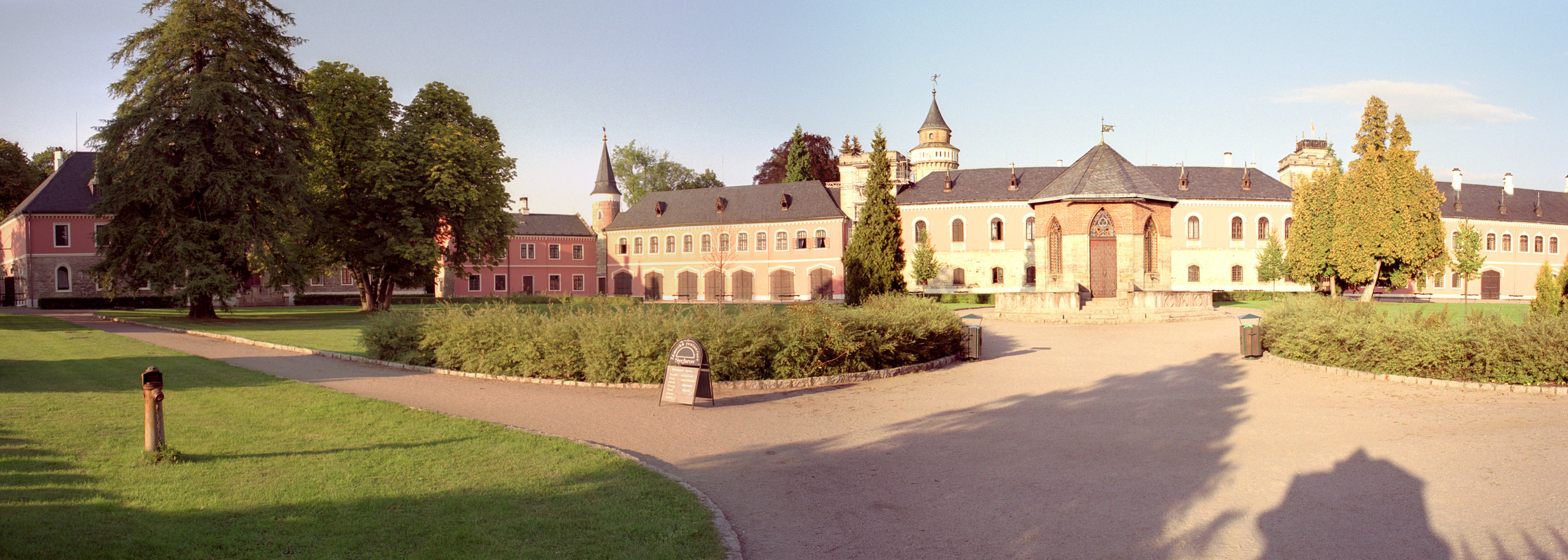
- Sychrov Castle viewed from the park

Site information
- Type: Castle
- Condition: Preserved
- Website: www.zamek-sychrov.cz/en

Location
- Coordinates: 50°37′35″N 15°05′20″E

Site history
- Built: 1690–1693
- Architect: Bernard Grueber
- Materials: Stone

Sychrov Castle (Czech: zámek Sychrov) is a castle in Sychrov in the Liberec Region of the Czech Republic. It is a unique example of Neo-Gothic castle architecture from the second half of the 19th century. A large park surrounds the castle.

== History ==
Since the 15th century, a fort existed in the place now occupied by Sychrov. During the years between 1690 and 1693, a small baroque castle was constructed here.

The castle was used for administrative purposes by the Waldstein estate in 1740, who later sold the property to the Rohan family in 1820. The 125-year-long ownership by the Rohans proved to be the most important in the castle's history.

In 1945 the castle was nationalized because of the Beneš decrees. Since 1950, it has been open to the public to a small extent. Since the 1970s, however, large parts of the castle were open to the public. Since the beginning of the 1990s, an extensive reconstruction and restoration of the castle exteriors, interiors, and the park have been underway, the object of which is to make Sychrov look as close to its original form at the time of its biggest boom, i.e., its condition in the second half of the 19th century, as possible. In 1995 it came under the protection of the state as a national cultural heritage site.

== Architecture ==
Room with Neo-Gothic furniture, before 1905, photo by Jindřich Eckert

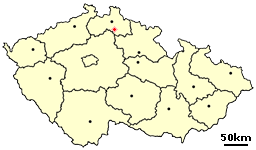
Location of Sychrov Castle in the Czech Republic

A small dilapidated Baroque castle was rebuilt by the Rohans and finished in 1834. The second reconstruction (1847–1862) put romantic neogothic style into the castle, and this style remains today. The reconstruction was carried out according to the plans of Bernard Grueber, and all works were facilitated by domestic artists and craftsmen.

The owner paid specific attention to the Castle Park, designed in the English style. The park became a model for the establishment of many now-important arboreta such as in Průhonice and Konopiště. During this period, a rare harmonising of the castle exterior, interior, and the park was accomplished. During the late 1920s/early 1930s, the castle interior was renovated. Especially valuable are the interior carvings by Petr Bušek, who worked in the castle for 38 years.

== Collections ==
The castle boasts a collection of around 250 portraits of the Rohans, related families, and French kings. It is the largest collection of French portrait paintings in Central Europe. Sychrov hosts unique glass paintings by Jan Zachariáš Quast.

== Park ==
The English park has an area of 23 hectares (57 acres). The older, classical park was remodeled into the romantic style. Since botany was a hobby of the castle owner, the park received a lot of attention: There are rich dendrological and botanical collections. Unique beech (Fagus silvatica Rohani) was cultivated in the park.

Since 2001, Scottish Highland Games (Skotské hry) take place in the park every summer.

== Legacy ==
Today Sychrov is a tourist attraction.

The composer Antonín Dvořák visited the castle, and several of his works were inspired by it. In honor of Dvořák, a classical music festival takes place there every year in June.

The castle has been used as a film location for Czech films and foreign films.

The 1997 comedy film The Beautician and the Beast, starring Fran Drescher and Timothy Dalton, and the 2022 war film All Quiet on the Western Front, were shot at the castle.

The castle also hosts wedding ceremonies.
