= Bílá (Liberec District) =

- Municipality
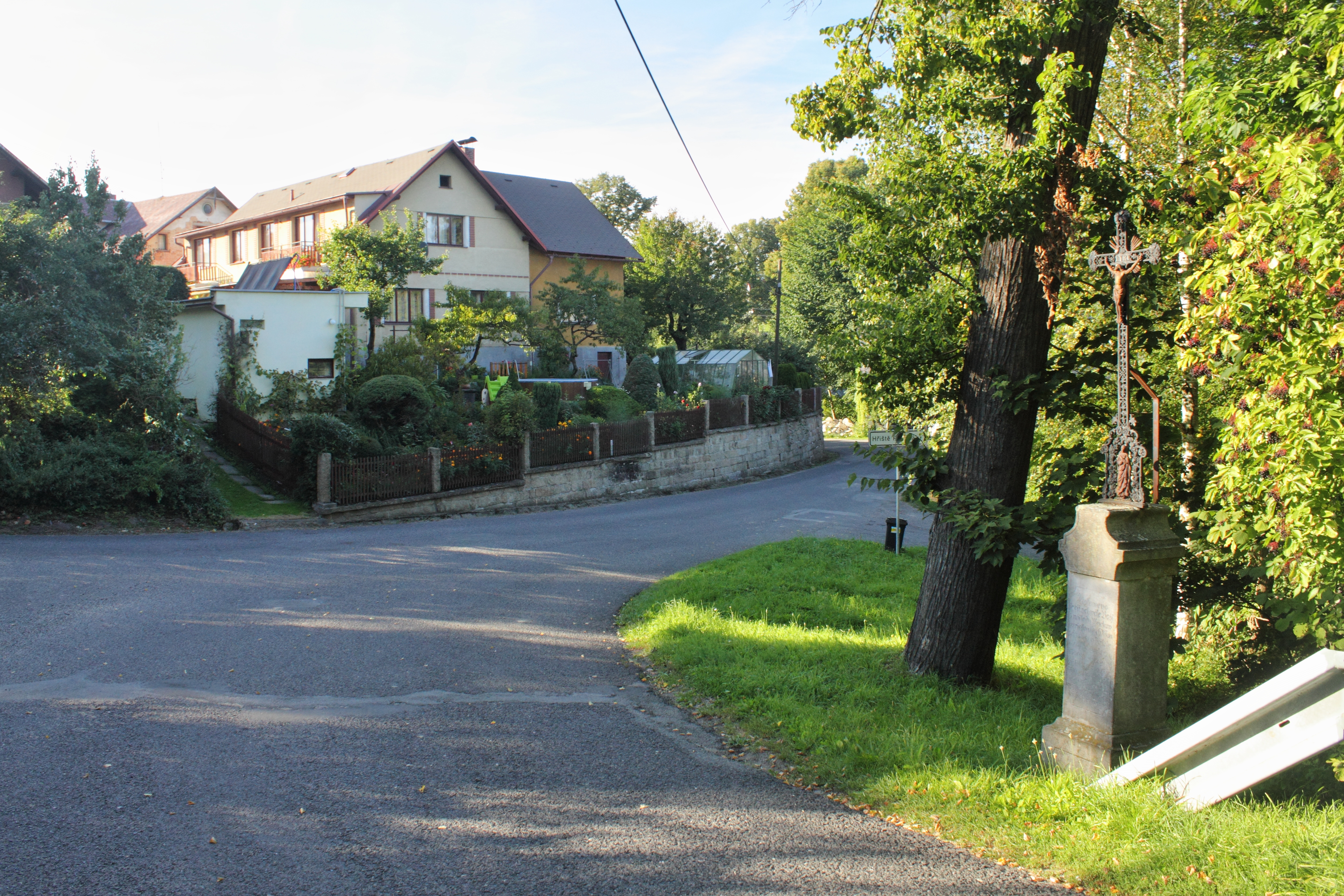
- Centre of Bílá

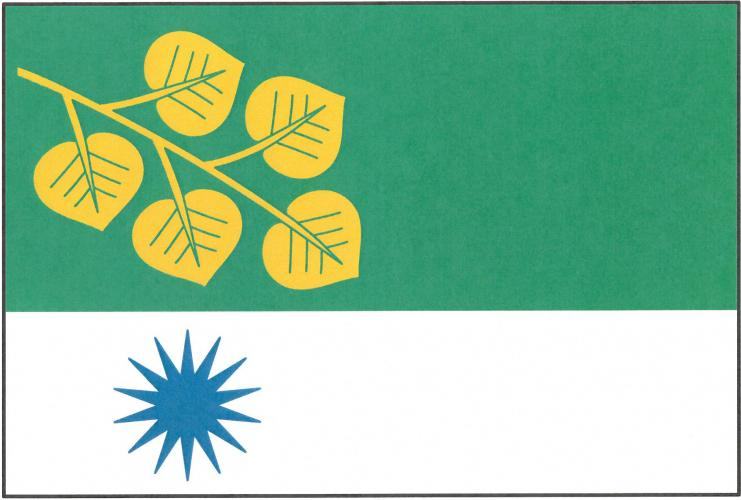
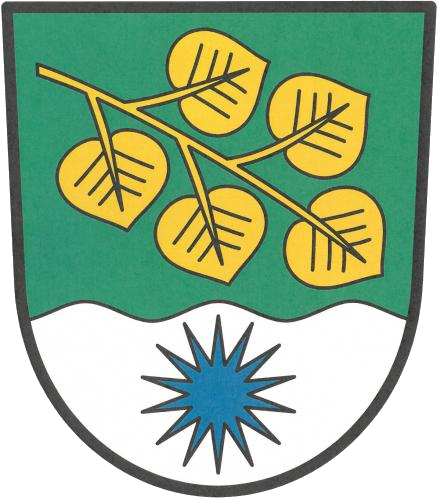
- Flag Coat of arms

- Location in the Czech Republic
- Coordinates: 50°39′54″N 15°2′8″E
- Country: Czech Republic
- Region: Liberec
- District: Liberec
- First mentioned: 1537

Area
  - Total: 26.30 km^{2} (10.15 sq mi)
- Elevation: 383 m (1,257 ft)

Population (2026-01-01)
  - Total: 951
  - Density: 36.2/km^{2} (93.7/sq mi)
- Time zone: UTC+1 (CET)
  - Summer (DST): UTC+2 (CEST)
- Postal code: 463 43
- Website: www.ou-bila.cz

Bílá is a municipality and village in Liberec District in the Liberec Region of the Czech Republic. It has about 1,000 inhabitants.

== Administrative division ==
Bílá consists of 14 municipal parts (in brackets population according to the 2021 census):

- Bílá (315)
- Bohdánkov (58)
- Chvalčovice (29)
- Dehtáry (11)
- Domaslavice (17)
- Hradčany (67)
- Klamorna (4)
- Kocourov (5)
- Kohoutovice (45)
- Letařovice (25)
- Petrašovice (136)
- Trávníček (24)
- Vesec (23)
- Vlčetín (195)

== Demographics ==
Historical population
| Year | Pop. | ±% |
|---|---|---|
| 1869 | 1,956 | — |
| 1880 | 1,913 | −2.2% |
| 1890 | 1,892 | −1.1% |
| 1900 | 1,731 | −8.5% |
| 1910 | 1,732 | +0.1% |
| 1921 | 1,672 | −3.5% |
| 1930 | 1,626 | −2.8% |
| 1950 | 1,093 | −32.8% |
| 1961 | 954 | −12.7% |
| 1970 | 771 | −19.2% |
| 1980 | 769 | −0.3% |
| 1991 | 797 | +3.6% |
| 2001 | 803 | +0.8% |
| 2011 | 843 | +5.0% |
| 2021 | 954 | +13.2% |
Source: Censuses
