= Radimovice u Tábora =

- Municipality
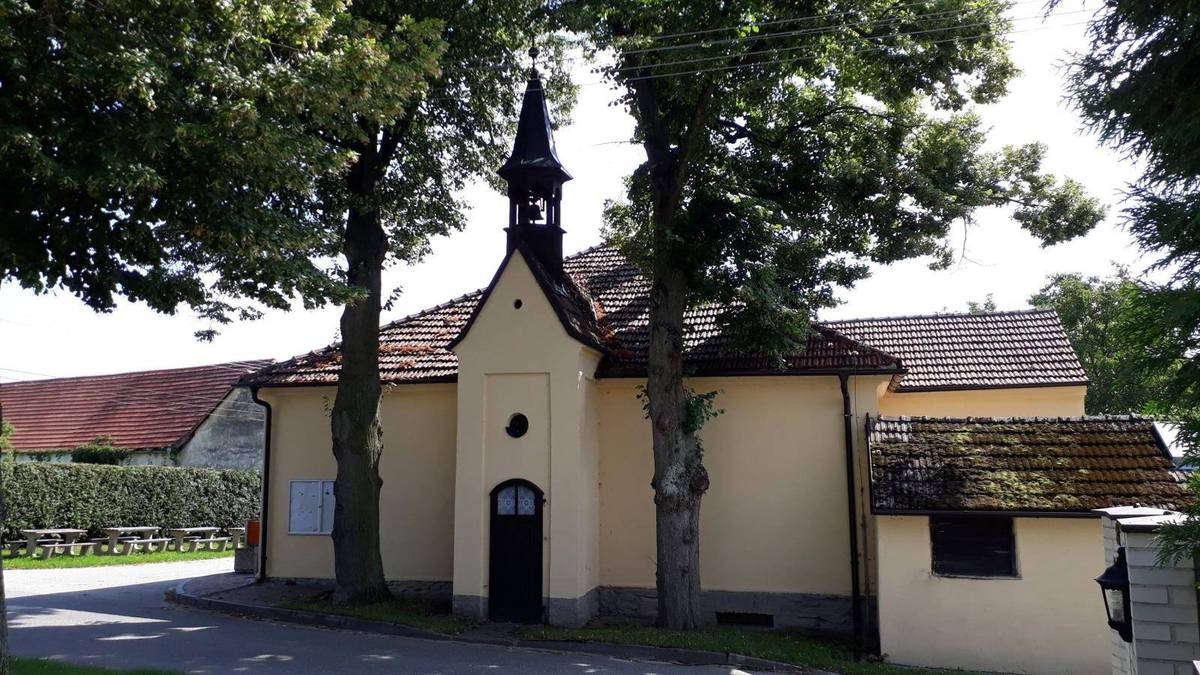
- Belfry

- Location in the Czech Republic
- Coordinates: 49°27′27″N 14°38′21″E
- Country: Czech Republic
- Region: South Bohemian
- District: Tábor
- First mentioned: 1219

Area
  - Total: 2.67 km^{2} (1.03 sq mi)
- Elevation: 487 m (1,598 ft)

Population (2026-01-01)
  - Total: 62
  - Density: 23/km^{2} (60/sq mi)
- Time zone: UTC+1 (CET)
  - Summer (DST): UTC+2 (CEST)
- Postal code: 391 31
- Website: www.radimoviceutabora.cz

Radimovice u Tábora is a municipality and village in Tábor District in the South Bohemian Region of the Czech Republic. It has about 60 inhabitants.

Radimovice u Tábora lies approximately 6 kilometres (4 mi) north of Tábor, 56 km (35 mi) north of České Budějovice, and 72 km (45 mi) south of Prague.

== Demographics ==
Historical population
Year	Pop.	±%
1869	99	—
1880	107	+8.1%
1890	130	+21.5%
1900	132	+1.5%
1910	131	−0.8%
1921	110	−16.0%
1930	96	−12.7%
1950	92	−4.2%
1961	91	−1.1%
1970	82	−9.9%
1980	65	−20.7%
1991	64	−1.5%
2001	63	−1.6%
2011	69	+9.5%
2021	62	−10.1%
Source: Censuses
