= Radimovice u Želče =

- Municipality
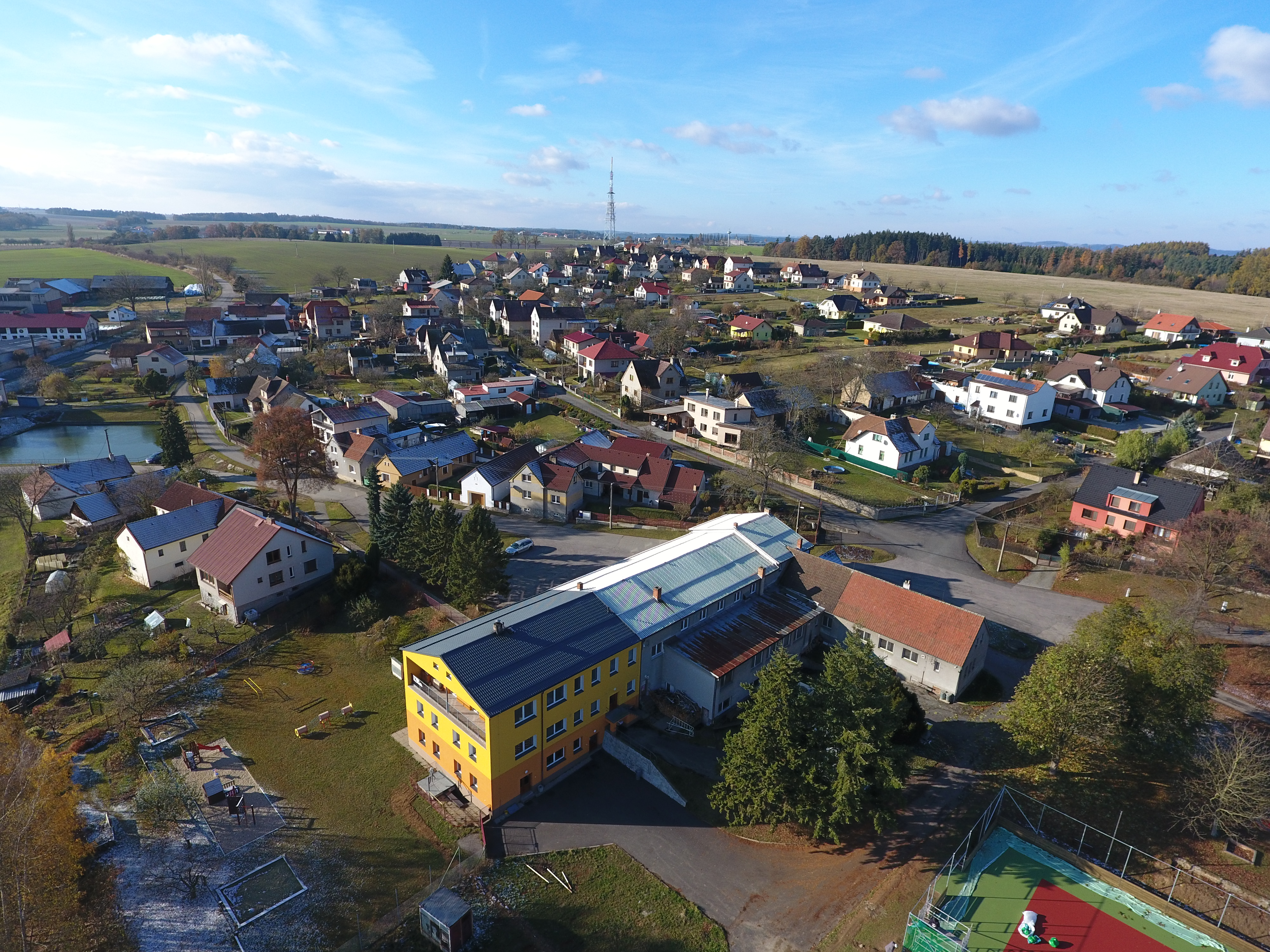
- View from the southeast

- Flag Coat of arms

- Location in the Czech Republic
- Coordinates: 49°22′38″N 14°38′51″E
- Country: Czech Republic
- Region: South Bohemian
- District: Tábor
- First mentioned: 1307

Area
  - Total: 4.49 km^{2} (1.73 sq mi)
- Elevation: 482 m (1,581 ft)

Population (2026-01-01)
  - Total: 443
  - Density: 98.7/km^{2} (256/sq mi)
- Time zone: UTC+1 (CET)
  - Summer (DST): UTC+2 (CEST)
- Postal code: 390 02
- Website: www.radimoviceuzelce.cz

Radimovice u Želče is a municipality and village in Tábor District in the South Bohemian Region of the Czech Republic. It has about 400 inhabitants.

Radimovice u Želče lies approximately 5 kilometres (3 mi) south of Tábor, 47 km (29 mi) north of České Budějovice, and 81 km (50 mi) south of Prague.

== Demographics ==
Historical population
Year	Pop.	±%
1869	348	—
1880	368	+5.7%
1890	373	+1.4%
1900	369	−1.1%
1910	340	−7.9%
1921	311	−8.5%
1930	300	−3.5%
1950	257	−14.3%
1961	291	+13.2%
1970	256	−12.0%
1980	293	+14.5%
1991	313	+6.8%
2001	325	+3.8%
2011	389	+19.7%
2021	369	−5.1%
Source: Censuses
