= Jičín Uplands =

Mountain range in the Czech Republic

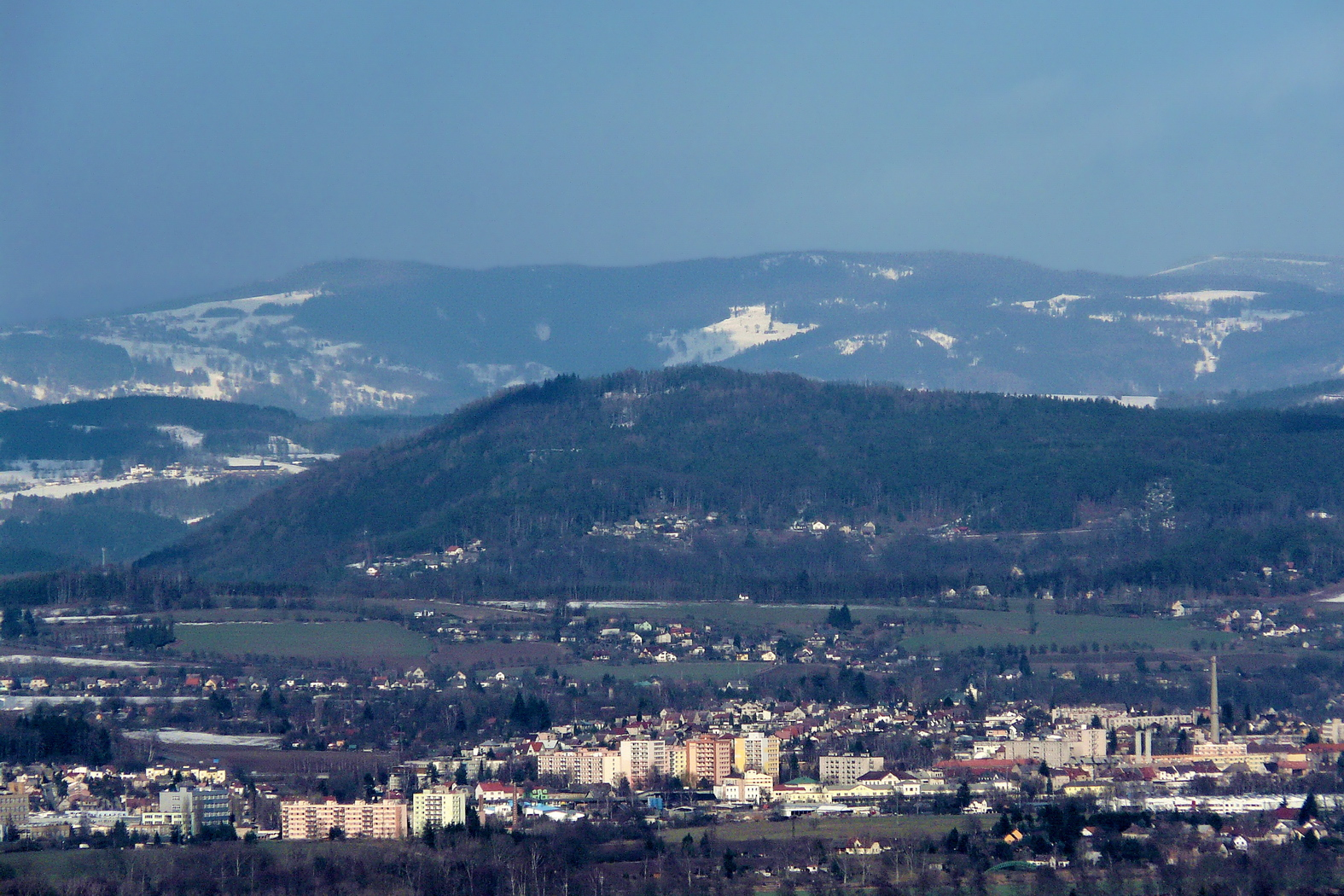
- Sokol, the highest peak

Highest point
- Peak: Sokol
- Elevation: 562 m (1,844 ft)

Dimensions
- Length: 70 km (43 mi)
- Area: 1,244 km^{2} (480 mi^{2})

Geography
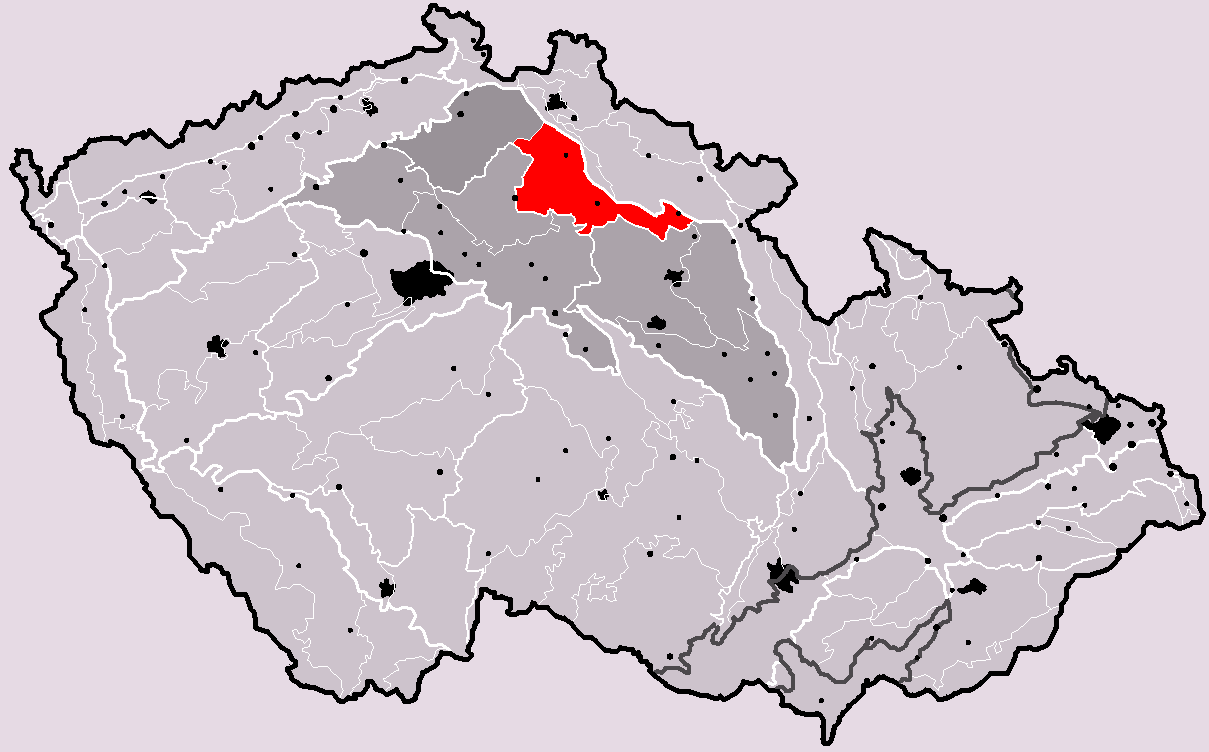
- Jičín Uplands in the geomorphological system of the Czech Republic
- Country: Czech Republic
- Regions: Hradec Králové, Liberec, Central Bohemian
- Range coordinates: 50°27′N 15°14′E
- Parent range: North Bohemian Table

Geology
- Rock type(s): Sandstone, shale, claystone, sediments

The Jičín Uplands (Czech: Jičínská pahorkatina) are uplands and a geomorphological mesoregion of the Czech Republic. It is located in the Hradec Králové, Liberec and Central Bohemian regions.

== Geomorphology ==
The Jičín Uplands are a mesoregion of the North Bohemian Table within the Bohemian Massif. The uplands are rugged and sometimes have a character of flat highlands. Typical features of the relief are cuestas, tabular plateaus, horst and anticlinal ridges, erosional denudation and tectonically conditioned basins, and furrows. The relief is complemented by several river terraces. The uplands are further subdivided into the microregions of Turnov Uplands and Bělohrad Uplands.

There are a lot of medium-high hills. The relief is very rugged, but the elevations are low. The highest peaks are located in the northern part of the territory. The highest peaks of the Jičín Uplands are:

- Sokol, 562 m (1,844 ft)
- Zabolky, 531 m (1,742 ft)
- Dehtovská horka, 525 m (1,722 ft)
- Trosky, 511 m (1,677 ft)
- Hrobka, 487 m (1,598 ft)
- Vyskeř, 466 m (1,529 ft)
- Přivýšina, 464 m (1,522 ft)
- Mužský, 463 m (1,519 ft)
- Záleský vrch, 459 m (1,506 ft)
- Střelečská hůra, 456 m (1,496 ft)

== Geography ==
The territory is L-shaped and elongated from west to east. The region has an area of 1,244 square kilometres (480 sq mi) and an average elevation of 306 m (1,004 ft).

The west of the territory is drained by the Jizera River, the east is drained by the Elbe. A notable river that crosses the centre of the territory is also the Cidlina (a tributaty of the Elbe).

Suitable natural conditions contributed to the creation of many settlements in the Jičín Uplands. The most populated settlements located in whole or in large part in the territory are Mladá Boleslav, Jičín, Dvůr Králové nad Labem, Turnov, Mnichovo Hradiště, Hořice, Bakov nad Jizerou and Kosmonosy.

== Nature ==
The territory alternates between forested and agricultural landscapes. The centre and north of the Jičín Uplands are continuously forested and are protected as the Bohemian Paradise Protected Landscape Area. Almost its entire area of 181.5 km^{2} (70 sq mi) lies in the Jičín Uplands.

== Gallery ==
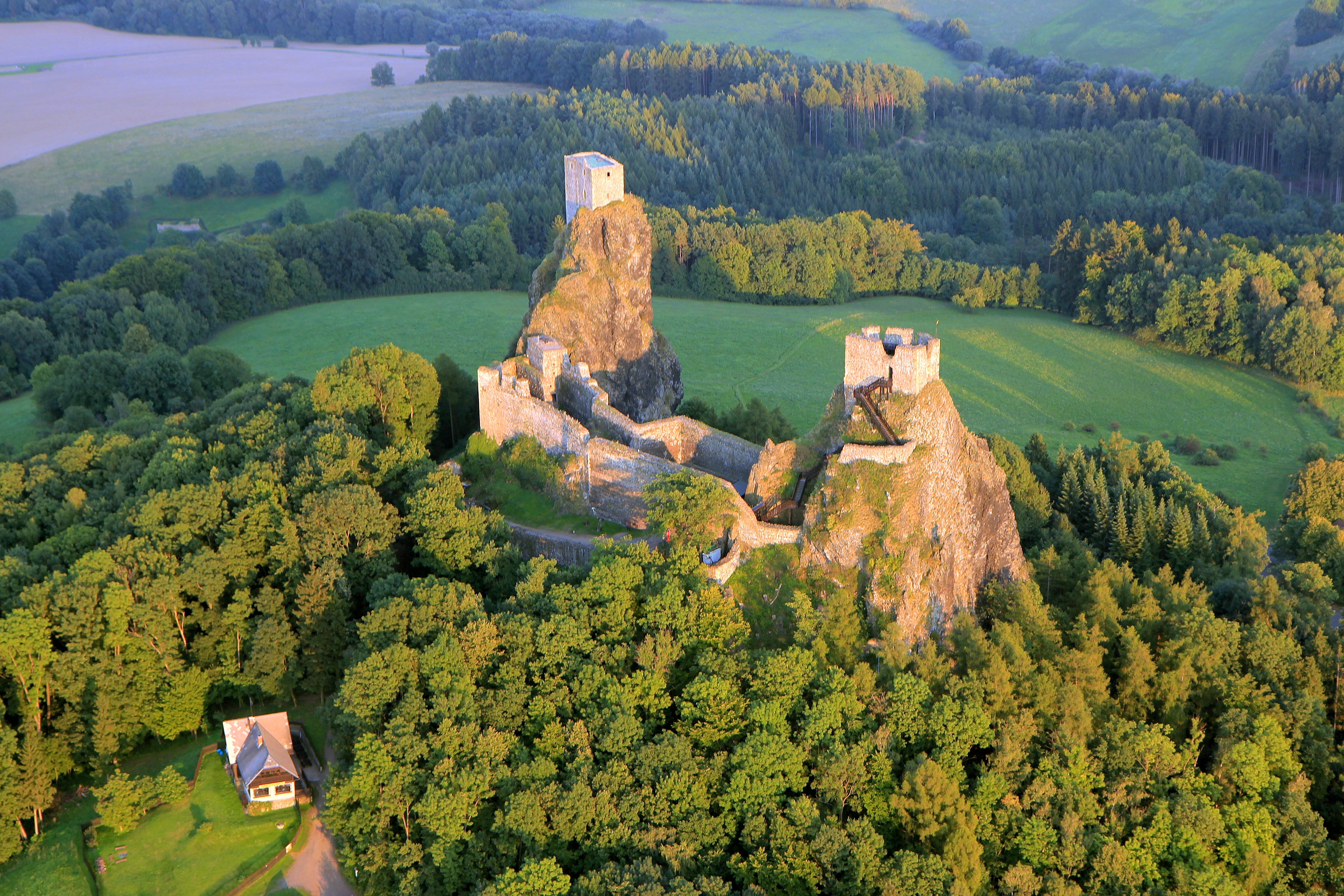
Aerial view of Trosky with Trosky Castle

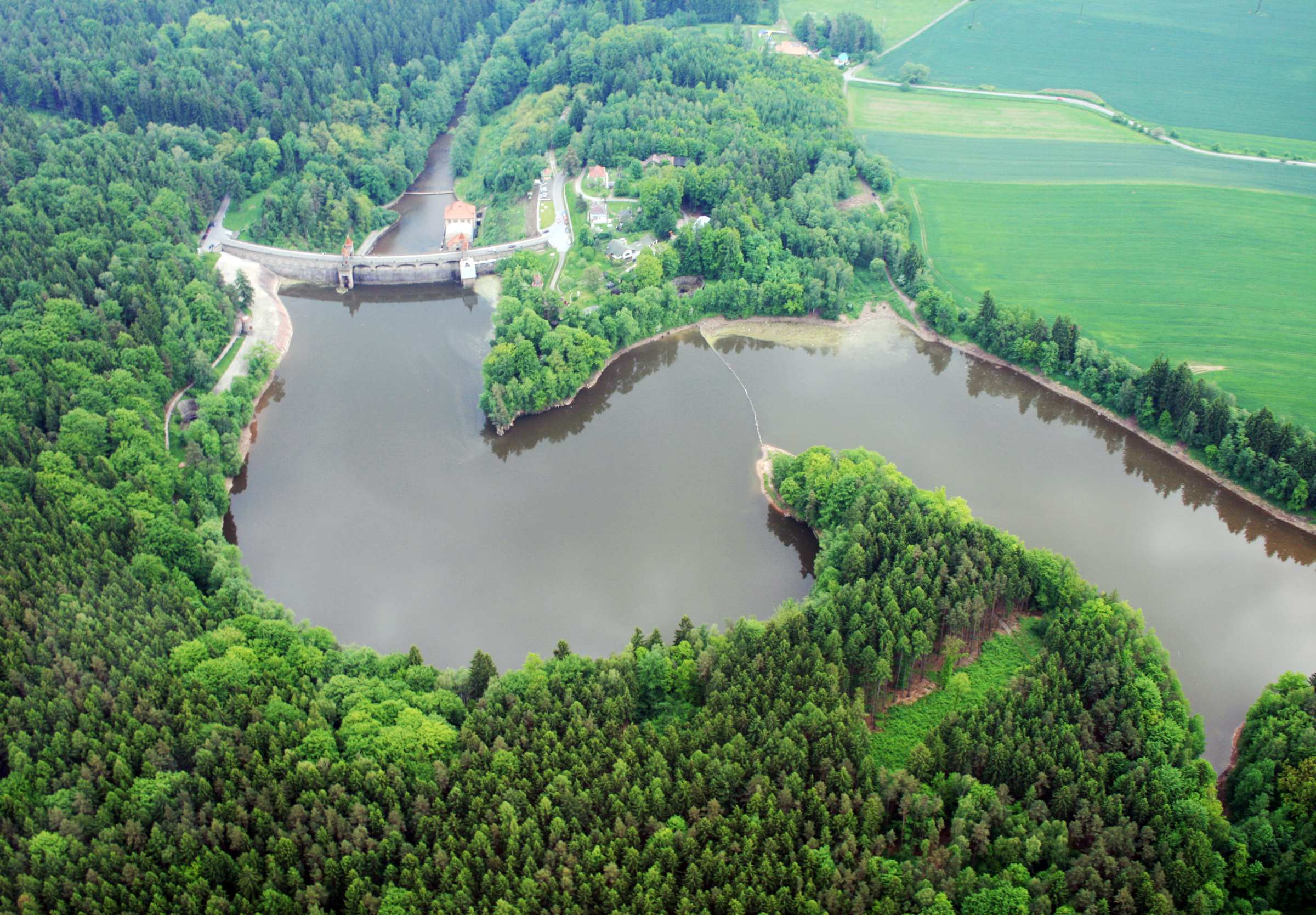
Les Království Reservoir built on the Elbe

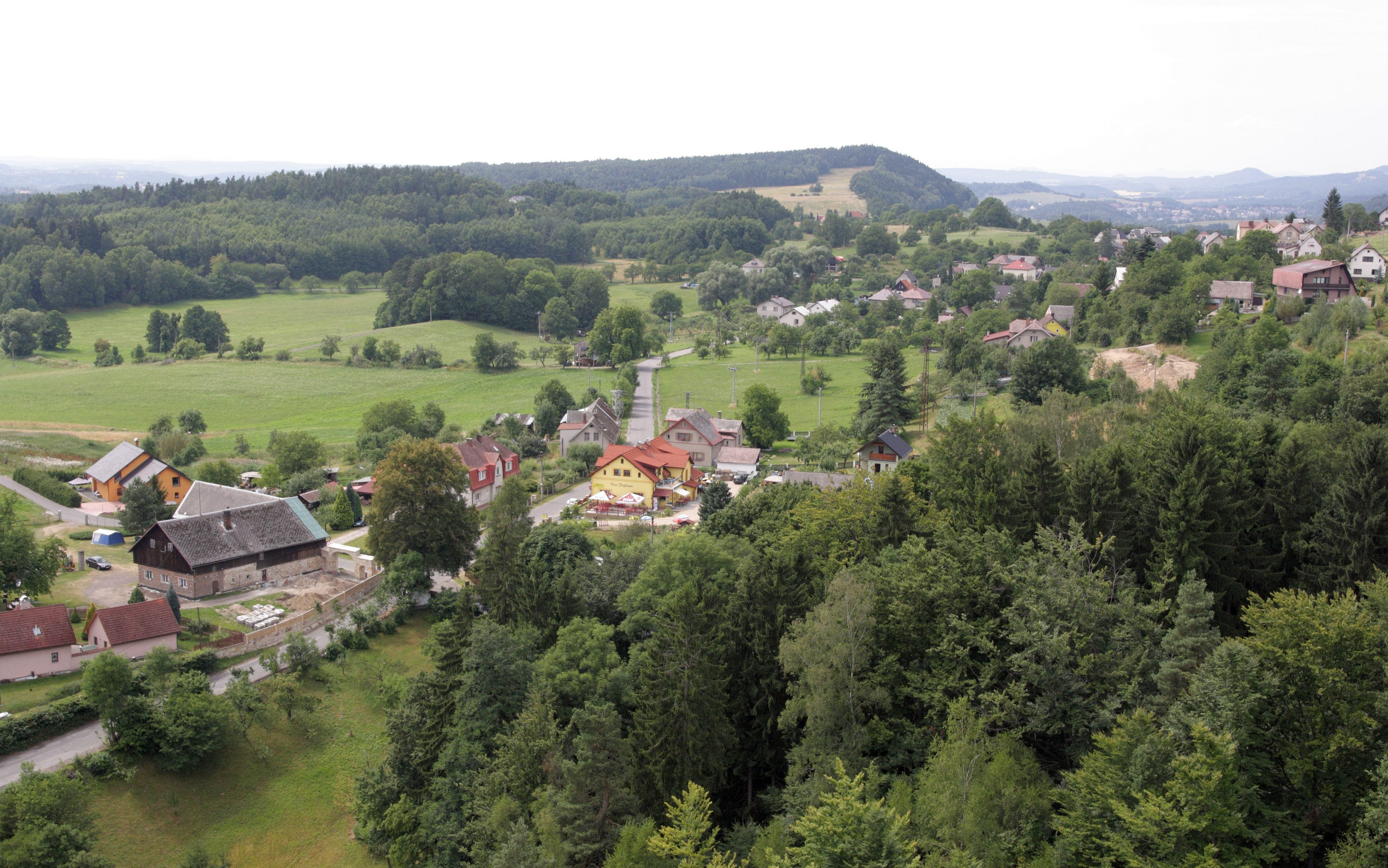
View towards Zabolky

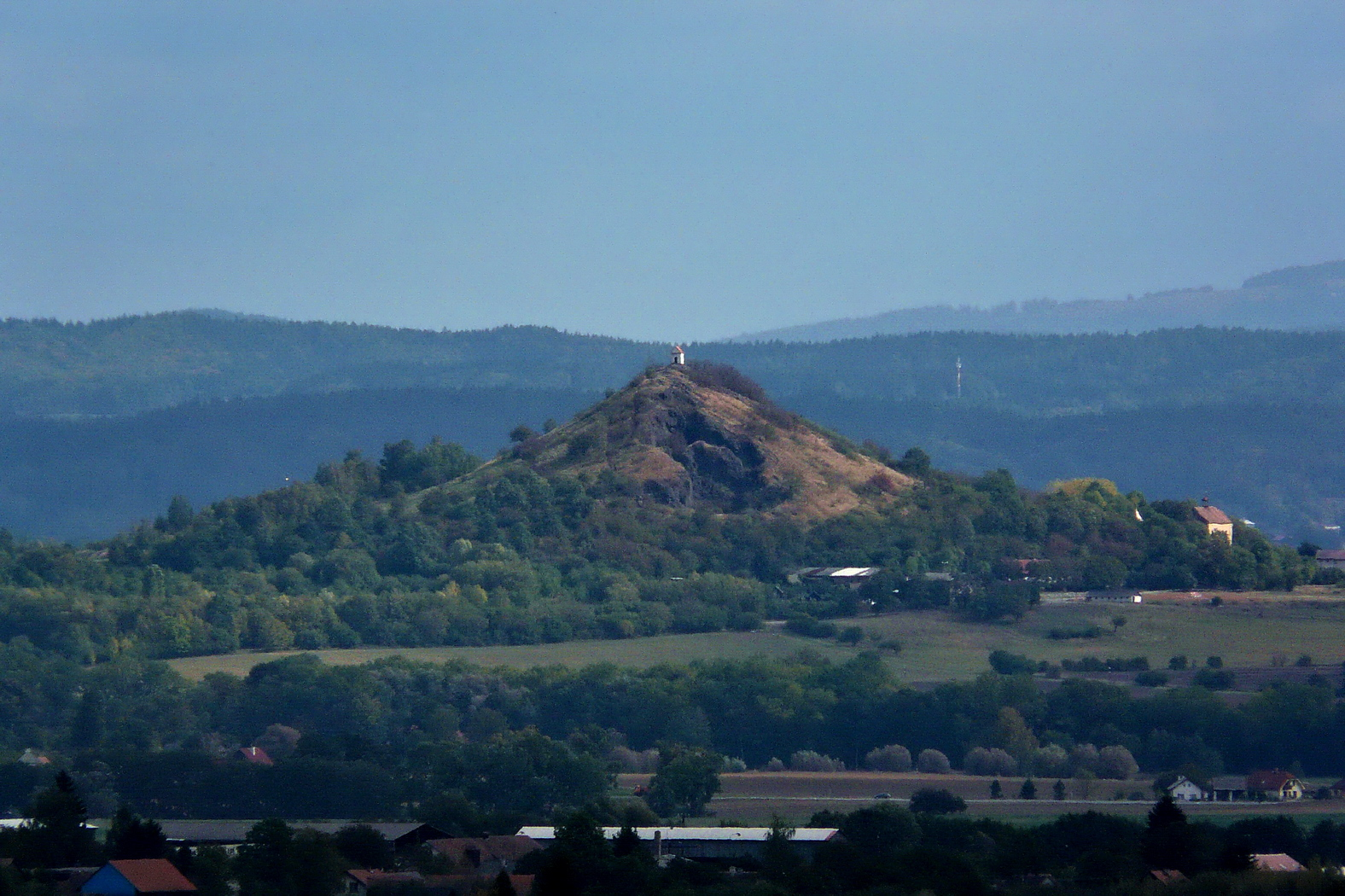
Zebín, a dominant feature near Jičín

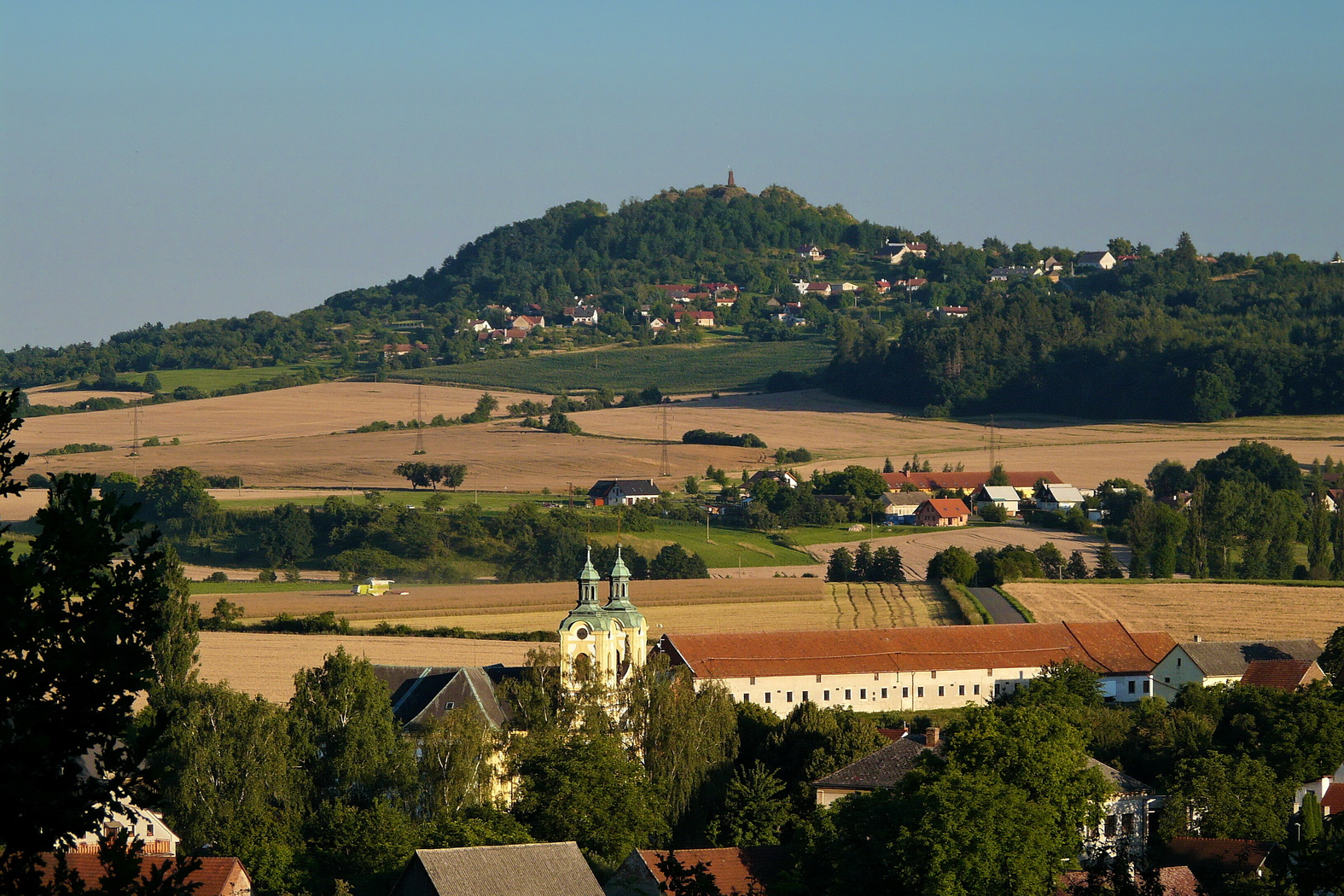
Veliš hill
