= Kovan =

Kovan may refer to:

== Places ==
- Kovan, Singapore, a suburb and part of Hougang, Singapore
  - Kovan MRT station, a station of the Mass Rapid Transit in Hougang, Singapore
- Kovan, West Virginia, US
- Kováň, a village and municipality in the Czech Republic

== Other uses ==
- Kovan (singer), Tamil folk singer and activist
- Kovan double murders, a 2013 double murder in Kovan, Singapore
