= Kovanec =

- Municipality
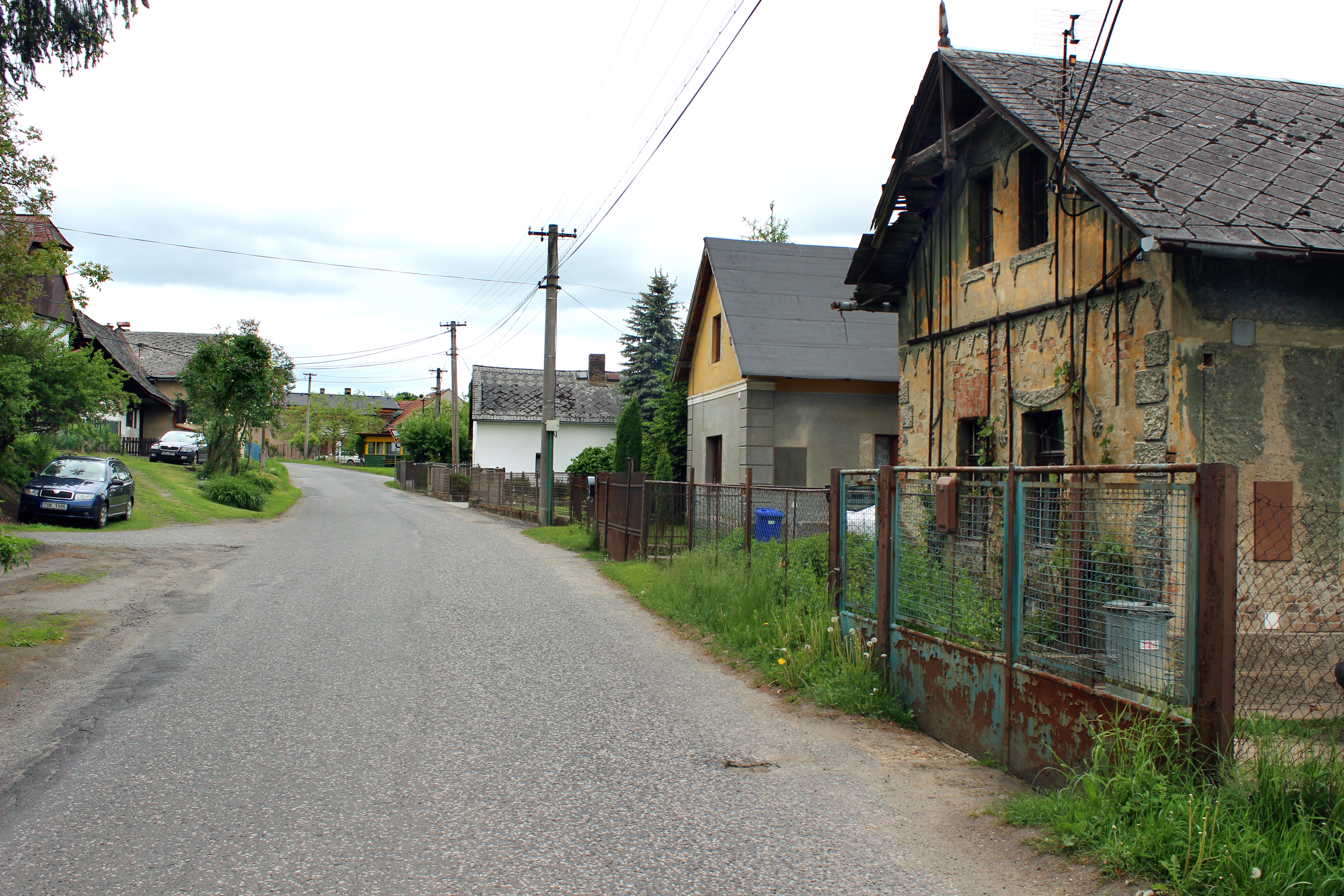
- Central part of Kovanec

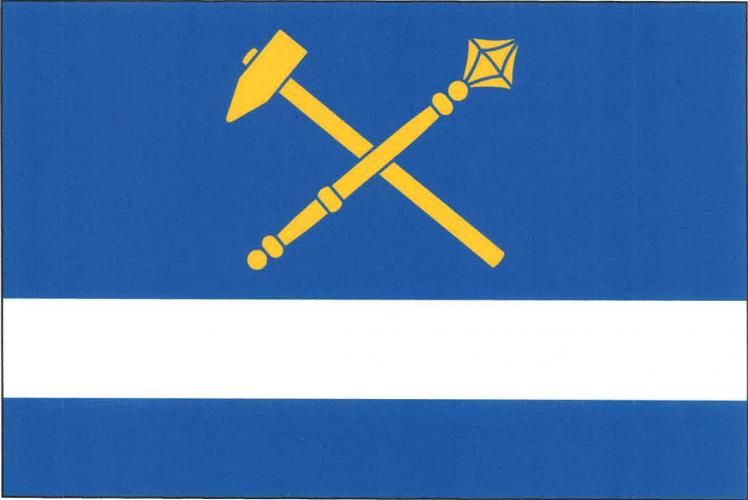
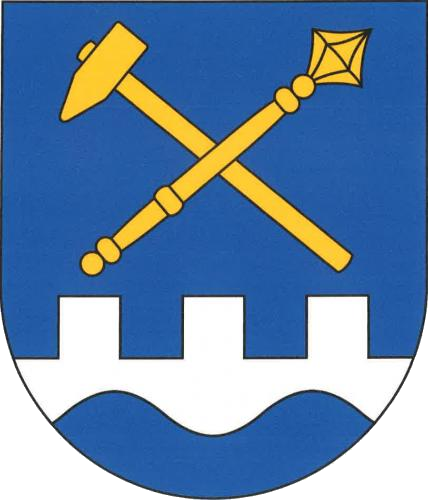
- Flag Coat of arms

- Location in the Czech Republic
- Coordinates: 50°25′4″N 14°46′36″E
- Country: Czech Republic
- Region: Central Bohemian
- District: Mladá Boleslav
- First mentioned: 1546

Area
  - Total: 3.77 km^{2} (1.46 sq mi)
- Elevation: 300 m (980 ft)

Population (2026-01-01)
  - Total: 122
  - Density: 32.4/km^{2} (83.8/sq mi)
- Time zone: UTC+1 (CET)
  - Summer (DST): UTC+2 (CEST)
- Postal code: 294 26
- Website: www.kovanec.cz

Kovanec is a municipality and village in Mladá Boleslav District in the Central Bohemian Region of the Czech Republic. It has about 100 inhabitants.

== Etymology ==
Kovanec is a diminutive form of Kováň, which is a village next to Kovanec. The name Kováň is derived from the personal name Kován, meaning "Kován's (court)".

== Geography ==
Kovanec is located about 9 kilometres (6 mi) west of Mladá Boleslav and 39 km (24 mi) northeast of Prague. It lies in the Jizera Table. The municipality is situated on the right bank of the stream Strenický potok.

== History ==
The first written mention of Kovanec is from 1546.

== Demographics ==
Historical population

Year	Pop.	±%
1869	255	—
1880	277	+8.6%
1890	295	+6.5%
1900	309	+4.7%
1910	300	−2.9%

Year	Pop.	±%
1921	294	−2.0%
1930	310	+5.4%
1950	175	−43.5%
1961	201	+14.9%
1970	170	−15.4%

Year	Pop.	±%
1980	156	−8.2%
1991	139	−10.9%
2001	130	−6.5%
2011	131	+0.8%
2021	122	−6.9%

Source: Censuses

== Transport ==
There are no railways or major roads passing through the municipality.

== Sights ==
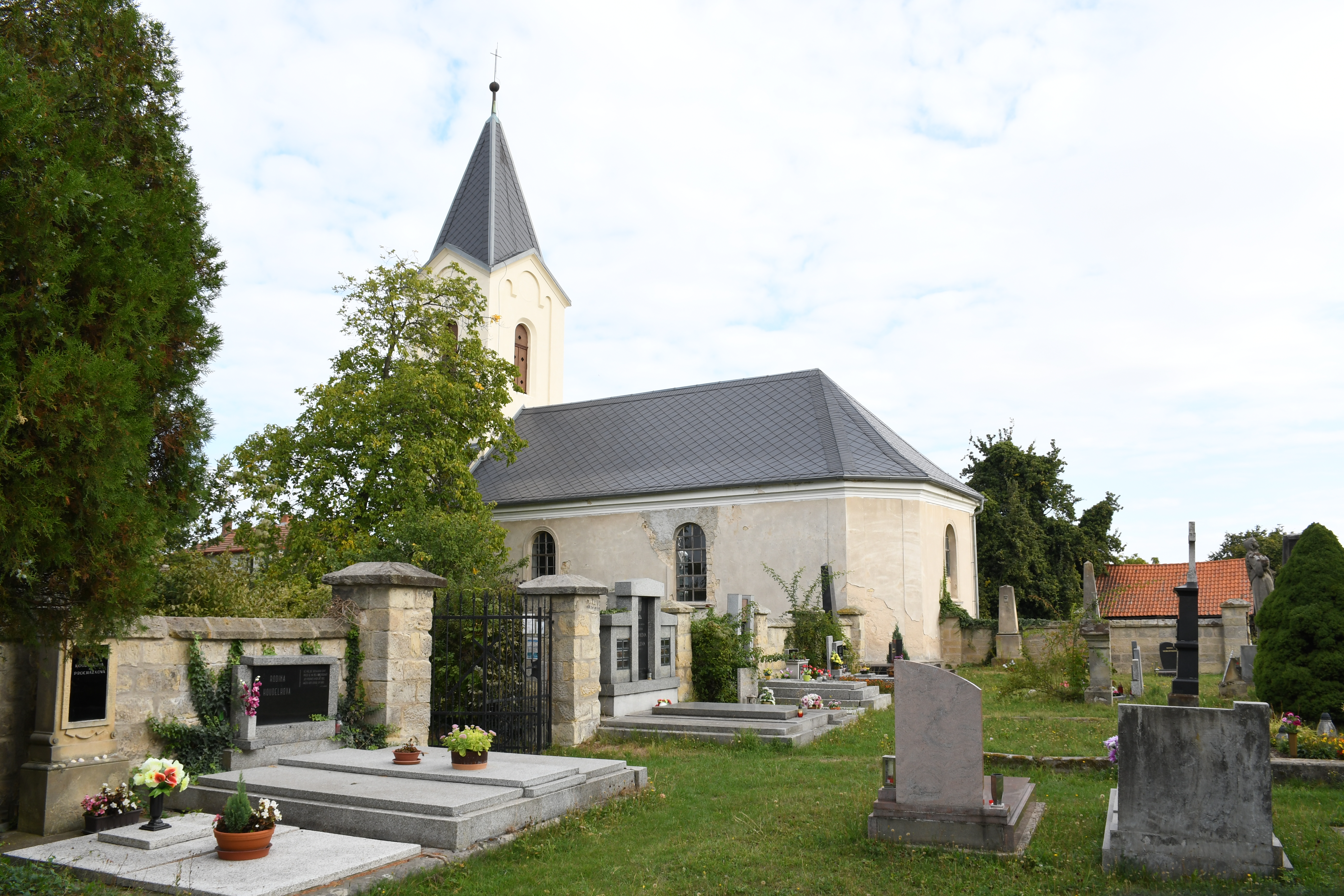
Protestant church

The main landmark of Kovanec is the Protestant church. It was built in the Baroque style in 1786 and the Neo-Romanesque tower was added in 1876. Next to the church is a Protestant cemetery.
