= Kovan (singer) =

Folk musician

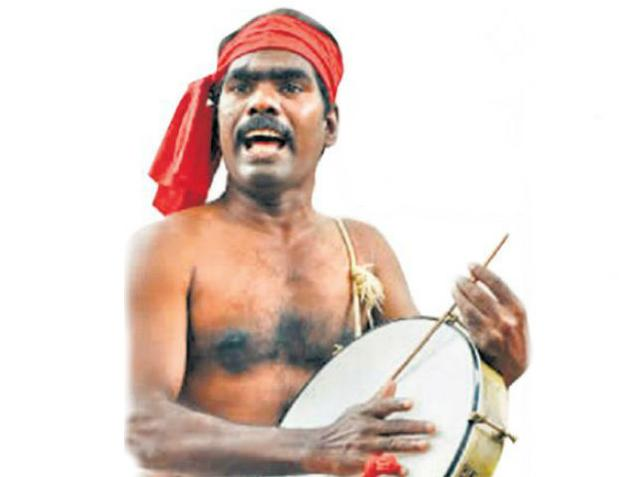
- Born: Kovil Esaney, Ariyalur DT
- Education: Industrial Training Institute, Nagapattinam
- Occupations: folk singer, activist

S.Sivadas (Kovan) is an Indian folk singer, and member of cultural and arts group Makkal Kalai Ilakkiya Kazhagam (People's Art and Literary Association). He writes songs and music about concerns and issues of marginalized people when DMK was not ruling Tamil Nadu.

== Arrests ==
Joining the widespread prohibition movement in Tamil Nadu, Kovan wrote, composed and performed songs criticising government-run alcohol shops and the government when AIADMK came to power. Those songs came to the attention of officials sympathetic to the AIADMK-led state government. In late October 2015, Kovan was arrested by TN Cyber Crime Police under "Sections 124-A (Sedition), 153 (Provoking riots), 505 (1) (b and c) (intent to cause fear and alarm to public against state and incitement). His crime – to have written, performed and released on the internet, songs criticising the state government of Tamil Nadu and its Chief Minister J Jayalalithaa on the burning issue of Prohibition".

His arrest prompted condemnation from activist groups, political parties and student bodies, joined by human rights organizations including Human Rights Watch and Amnesty International. Notably AIADMK and TN Bharatiya Janata Party did not join. The songs went viral through social media.

The state government considered these songs derogatory, seditious, and attempted to remove these songs from YouTube. It also tried to shut down vinavu.com, a website supportive of the artist. Amnesty International India repeated its call to repeal the sedition law. Sedition law was created and used by the colonial British government against the Indian independence movement. Kovan was released on bail on 16 November 2015. He was again arrested for a song against the Ram Rath Yatra and Narendra Modi.
