= Kováň =

- Municipality
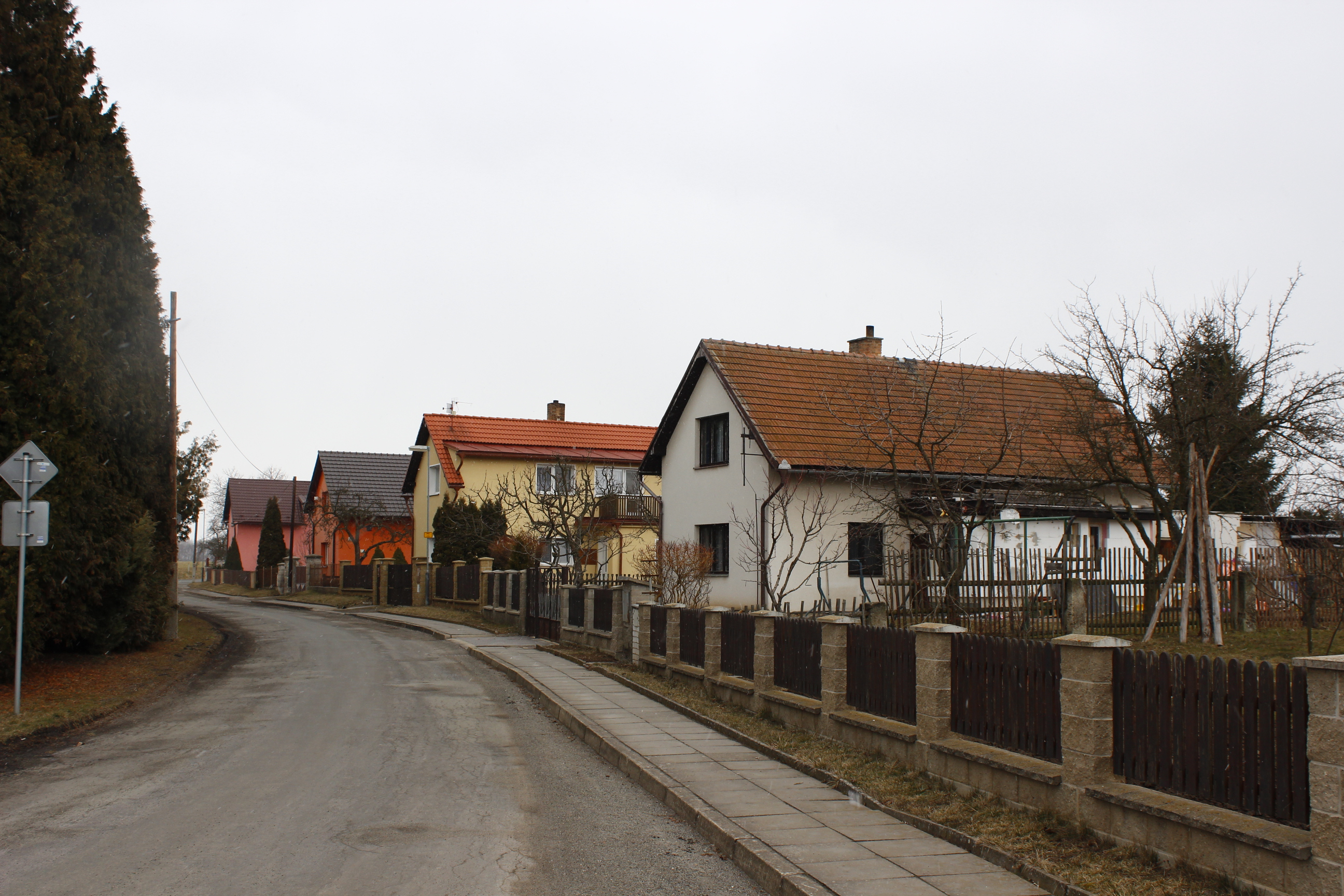
- A street in Kováň

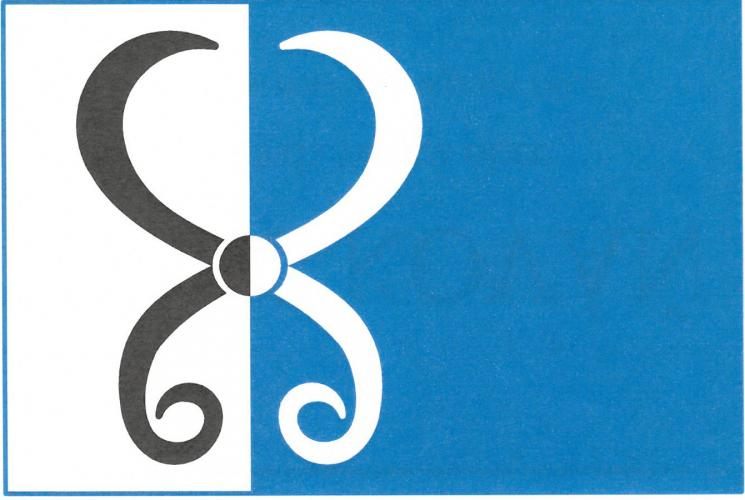
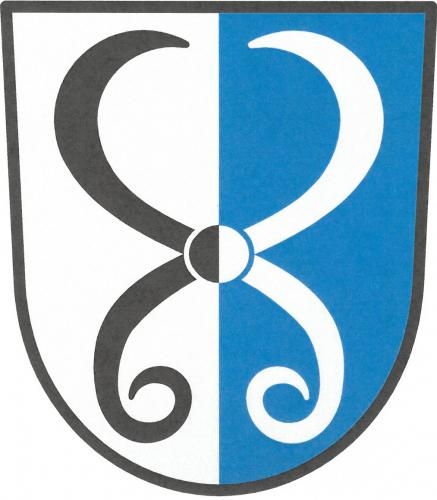
- Flag Coat of arms

- Location in the Czech Republic
- Coordinates: 50°25′24″N 14°46′40″E
- Country: Czech Republic
- Region: Central Bohemian
- District: Mladá Boleslav
- First mentioned: 1219

Area
  - Total: 1.63 km^{2} (0.63 sq mi)
- Elevation: 301 m (988 ft)

Population (2026-01-01)
  - Total: 156
  - Density: 95.7/km^{2} (248/sq mi)
- Time zone: UTC+1 (CET)
  - Summer (DST): UTC+2 (CEST)
- Postal code: 294 25
- Website: www.obeckovan.cz

Kováň is a municipality and village in Mladá Boleslav District in the Central Bohemian Region of the Czech Republic. It has about 200 inhabitants.

== Etymology ==
The name is derived from the personal name Kován, meaning "Kován's (court)".

== Geography ==
Kováň is located about 9 kilometres (6 mi) west of Mladá Boleslav and 39 km (24 mi) northeast of Prague. It lies in the Jizera Table. The municipality is situated on the left bank of the stream Strenický potok.

== History ==
The first written mention of Kováň is from 1219.

== Demographics ==
Historical population

Year	Pop.	±%
1869	206	—
1880	253	+22.8%
1890	257	+1.6%
1900	293	+14.0%
1910	283	−3.4%

Year	Pop.	±%
1921	260	−8.1%
1930	285	+9.6%
1950	217	−23.9%
1961	220	+1.4%
1970	177	−19.5%

Year	Pop.	±%
1980	149	−15.8%
1991	122	−18.1%
2001	143	+17.2%
2011	154	+7.7%
2021	123	−20.1%

Source: Censuses

== Economy ==
Kováň is known for the Podkováň brewery. The brewery was founded in 1434.

== Transport ==
There are no railways or major roads passing through the municipality.

== Sights ==
The main landmark of Kováň is the Church of Saint Francis of Assisi. It was built in the Baroque style around 1750.
