= Chotovice =

Chotovice or Choťovice may refer to places in the Czech Republic:

- Chotovice (Česká Lípa District), a municipality and village in the Liberec Region
- Chotovice (Svitavy District), a municipality and village in the Pardubice Region
- Choťovice, a municipality and village in the Central Bohemian Region
