= Pertoltice =

Pertoltice may refer to places in the Czech Republic:

- Pertoltice (Kutná Hora District), a municipality and village in the Central Bohemian Region
- Pertoltice (Liberec District), a municipality and village in the Liberec Region
- Pertoltice pod Ralskem, a municipality and village in the Liberec Region
