= Tuhaň =

Tuhaň may refer to places in the Czech Republic:

- Tuhaň (Česká Lípa District), a municipality and village in the Liberec Region
- Tuhaň (Mělník District), a municipality and village in the Central Bohemian Region
- Tuhaň, a village and part of Stružinec in the Liberec Region
