= Nový Oldřichov =

- Municipality
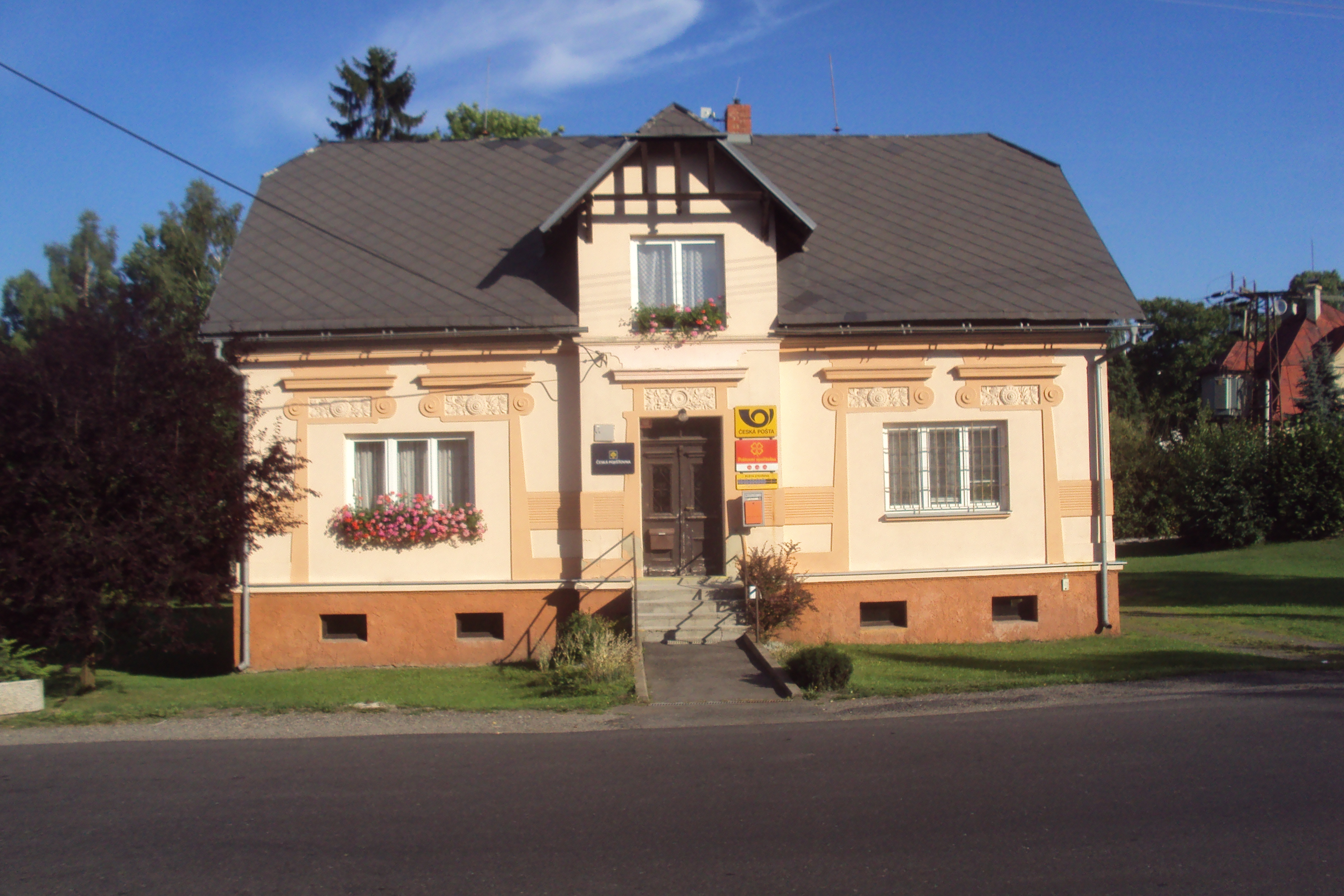
- Post office

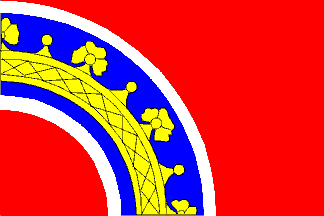
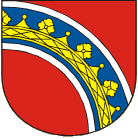
- Flag Coat of arms

- Location in the Czech Republic
- Coordinates: 50°45′56″N 14°26′32″E
- Country: Czech Republic
- Region: Liberec
- District: Česká Lípa
- First mentioned: 1412

Area
  - Total: 3.77 km^{2} (1.46 sq mi)
- Elevation: 468 m (1,535 ft)

Population (2026-01-01)
  - Total: 818
  - Density: 217/km^{2} (562/sq mi)
- Time zone: UTC+1 (CET)
  - Summer (DST): UTC+2 (CEST)
- Postal code: 471 13
- Website: www.obecnovyoldrichov.cz

Nový Oldřichov (until 1950 Oldřichov u České Lípy; German: Ullrichsthal) is a municipality and village in Česká Lípa District in the Liberec Region of the Czech Republic. It has about 800 inhabitants.

== Administrative division ==
Nový Oldřichov consists of two municipal parts (in brackets population according to the 2021 census):

- Nový Oldřichov (397)
- Mistrovice (370)

== Demographics ==
Historical population
Year	Pop.	±%
1869	2,012	—
1880	2,001	−0.5%
1890	2,212	+10.5%
1900	2,179	−1.5%
1910	2,178	−0.0%
1921	1,911	−12.3%
1930	1,998	+4.6%
1950	899	−55.0%
1961	906	+0.8%
1970	933	+3.0%
1980	744	−20.3%
1991	623	−16.3%
2001	638	+2.4%
2011	719	+12.7%
2021	767	+6.7%
Source: Censuses
