= Blatce =

- Municipality
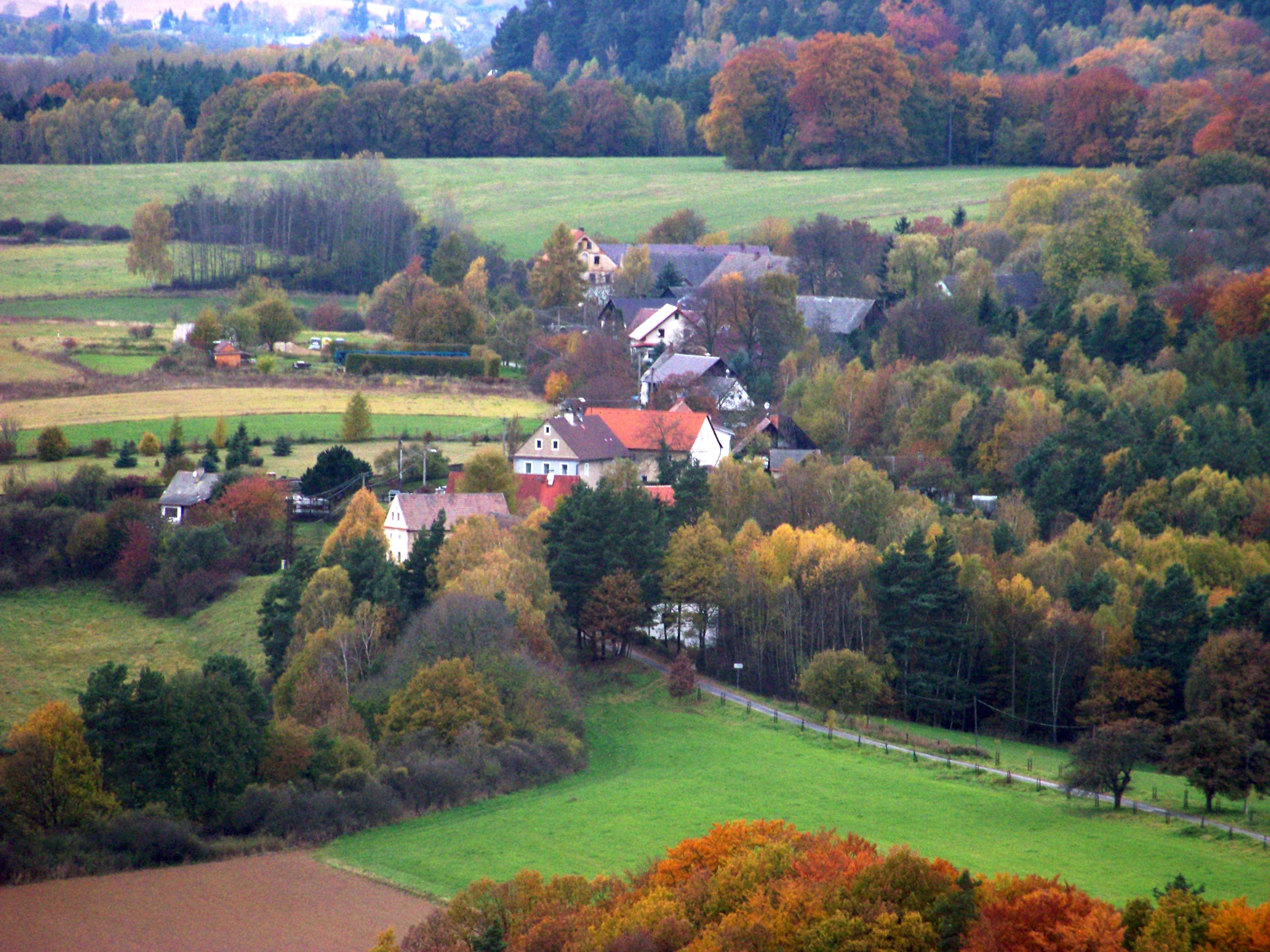
- View from the southeast

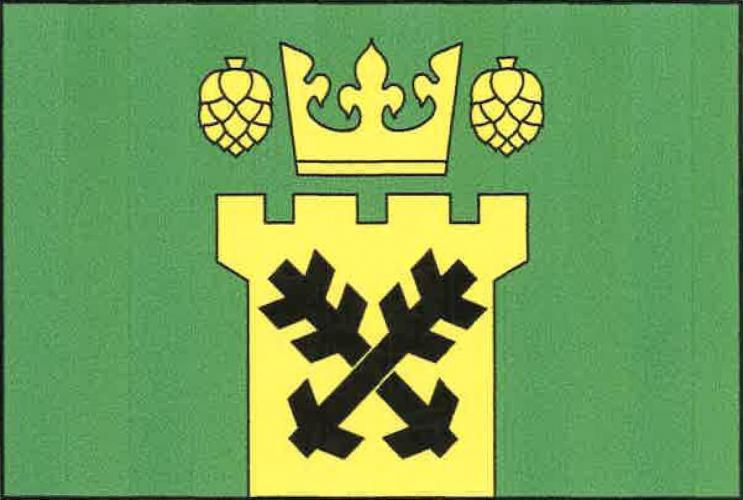
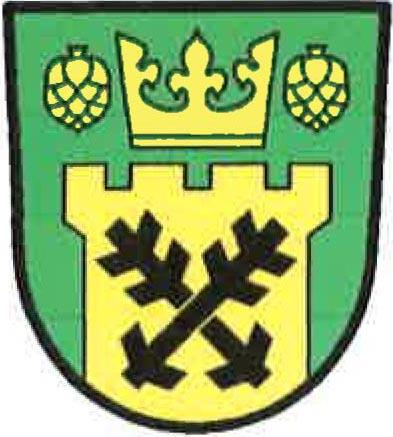
- Flag Coat of arms

- Location in the Czech Republic
- Coordinates: 50°30′11″N 14°36′12″E
- Country: Czech Republic
- Region: Liberec
- District: Česká Lípa
- First mentioned: 1414

Area
  - Total: 16.97 km^{2} (6.55 sq mi)
- Elevation: 360 m (1,180 ft)

Population (2026-01-01)
  - Total: 120
  - Density: 7.1/km^{2} (18/sq mi)
- Time zone: UTC+1 (CET)
  - Summer (DST): UTC+2 (CEST)
- Postal code: 472 01
- Website: blatce.cz

Blatce (German: Großblatzen) is a municipality and village in Česká Lípa District in the Liberec Region of the Czech Republic. It has about 100 inhabitants.

== Administrative division ==
Blatce consists of six municipal parts (in brackets population according to the 2021 census):

- Blatce (52)
- Beškov (8)
- Blatečky (6)
- Houska (50)
- Konrádov (10)
- Tubož (12)

== Demographics ==
Historical population
Year	Pop.	±%
1869	1,090	—
1880	1,037	−4.9%
1890	912	−12.1%
1900	804	−11.8%
1910	771	−4.1%
1921	741	−3.9%
1930	689	−7.0%
1950	286	−58.5%
1961	250	−12.6%
1970	144	−42.4%
1980	94	−34.7%
1991	55	−41.5%
2001	57	+3.6%
2011	98	+71.9%
2021	138	+40.8%
Source: Censuses

== Sights ==
Blatce is known for the Houska Castle. It is open to the public.
