= Dubnice =

- Municipality
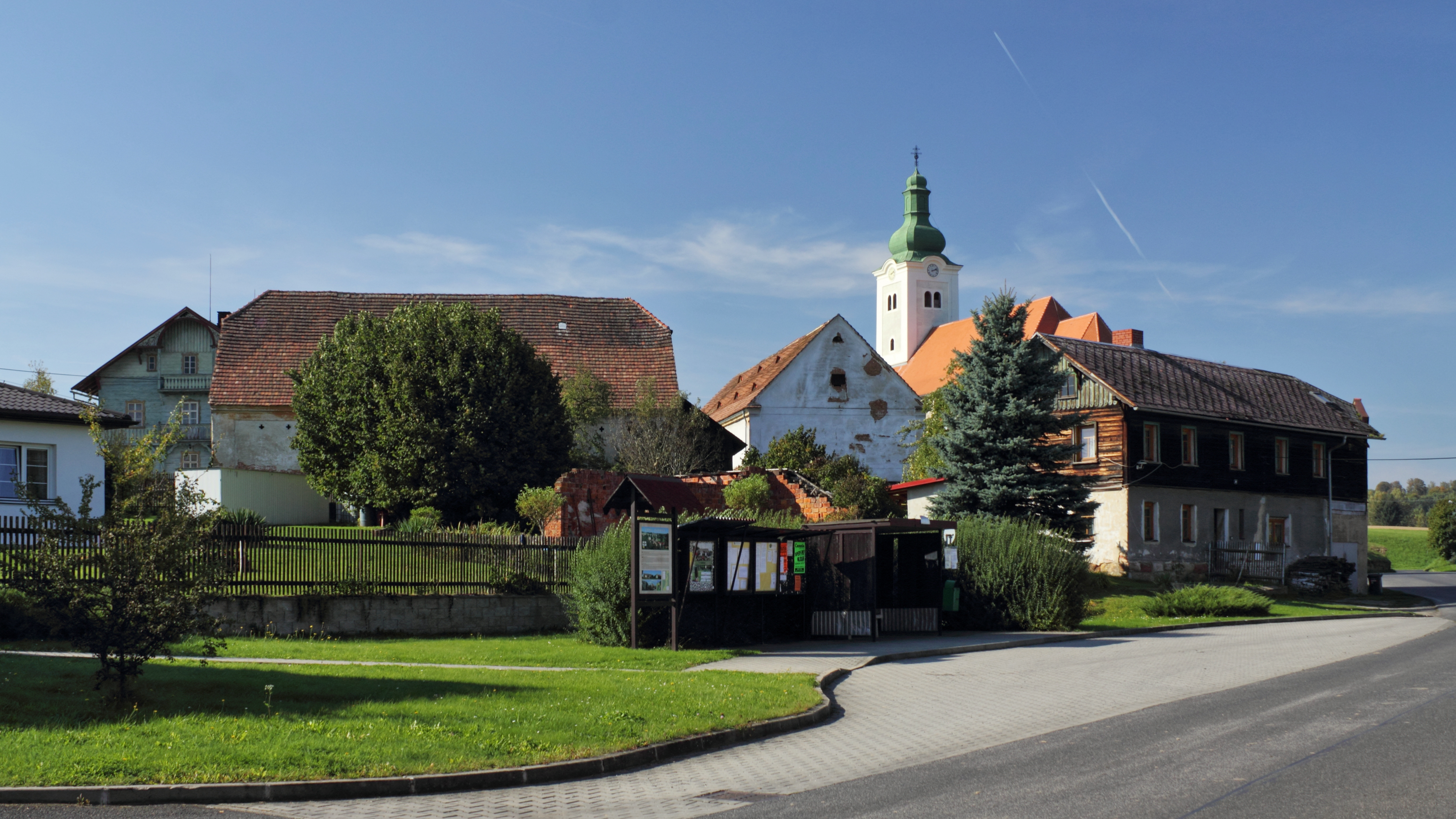
- Church of the Nativity of Mary

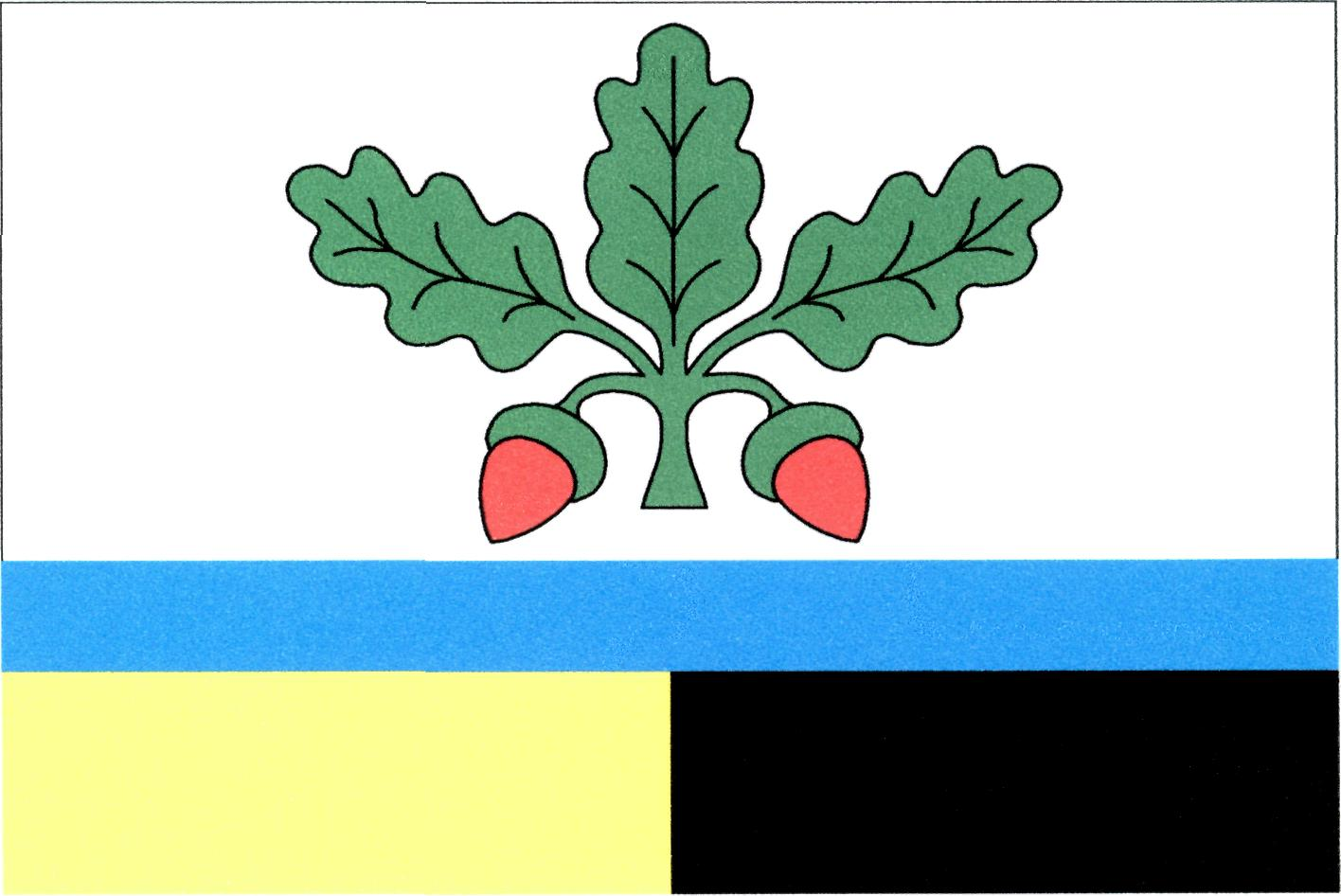
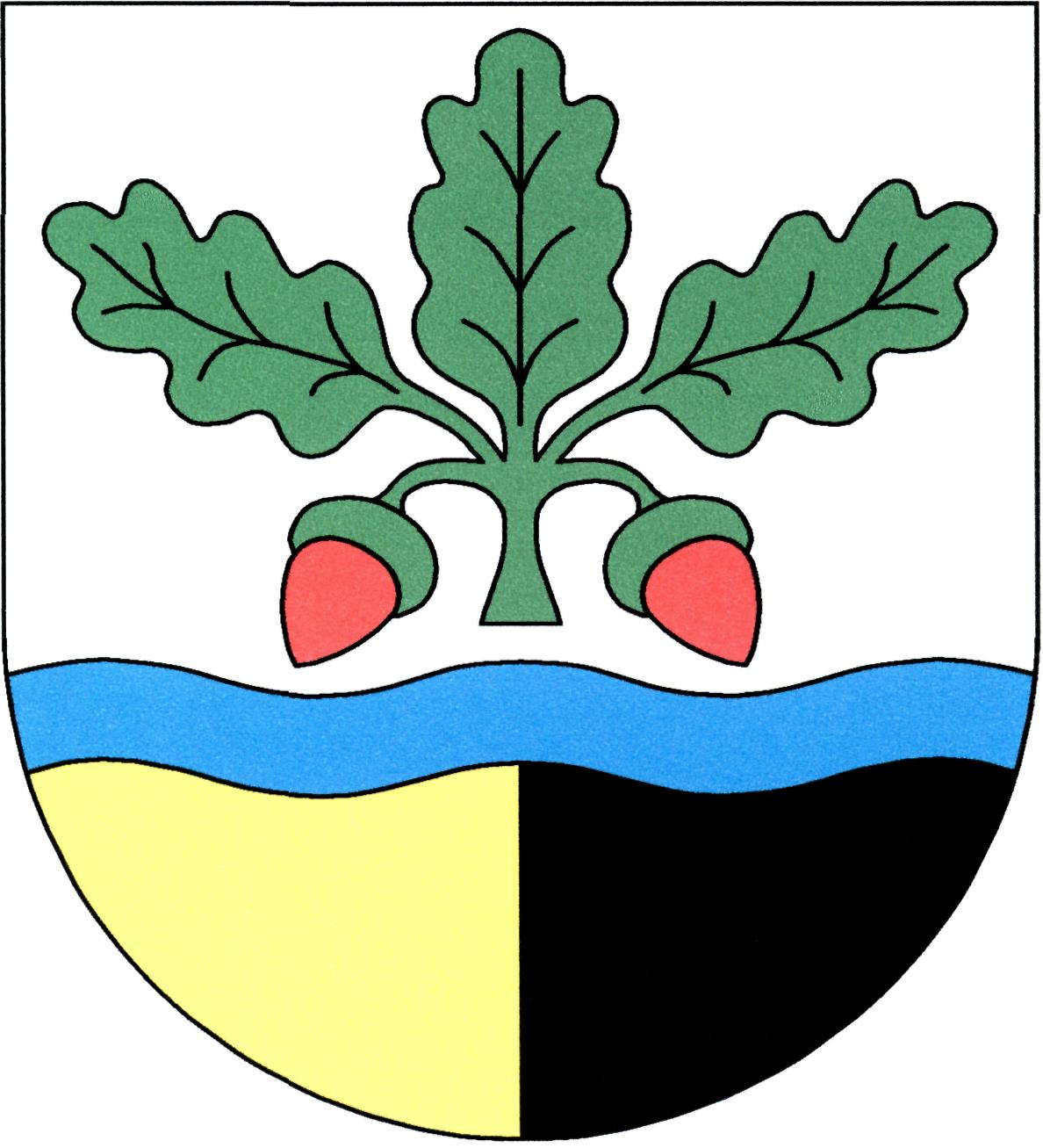
- Flag Coat of arms

- Location in the Czech Republic
- Coordinates: 50°43′34″N 14°48′32″E
- Country: Czech Republic
- Region: Liberec
- District: Česká Lípa
- First mentioned: 1352

Area
  - Total: 15.83 km^{2} (6.11 sq mi)
- Elevation: 313 m (1,027 ft)

Population (2026-01-01)
  - Total: 659
  - Density: 41.6/km^{2} (108/sq mi)
- Time zone: UTC+1 (CET)
  - Summer (DST): UTC+2 (CEST)
- Postal code: 471 26
- Website: www.obecdubnice.cz

Dubnice (German: Hennersdorf) is a municipality and village in Česká Lípa District in the Liberec Region of the Czech Republic. It has about 700 inhabitants.

== Demographics ==
Historical population
Year	Pop.	±%
1869	1,268	—
1880	1,163	−8.3%
1890	1,072	−7.8%
1900	1,078	+0.6%
1910	1,057	−1.9%
1921	1,007	−4.7%
1930	947	−6.0%
1950	588	−37.9%
1961	499	−15.1%
1970	479	−4.0%
1980	460	−4.0%
1991	508	+10.4%
2001	523	+3.0%
2011	620	+18.5%
2021	627	+1.1%
Source: Censuses
