= Tachov (Česká Lípa District) =

- Municipality
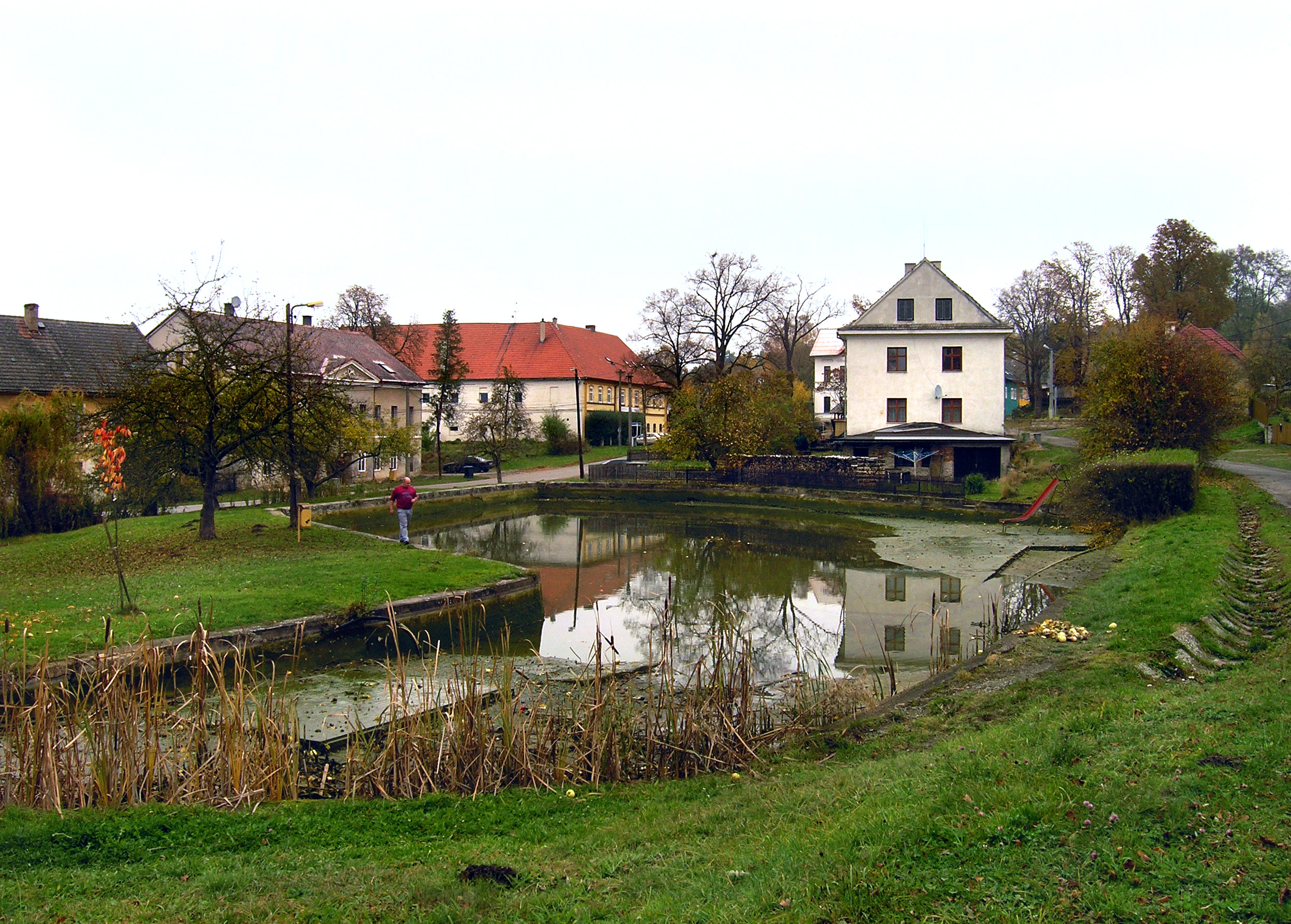
- Centre of Tachov

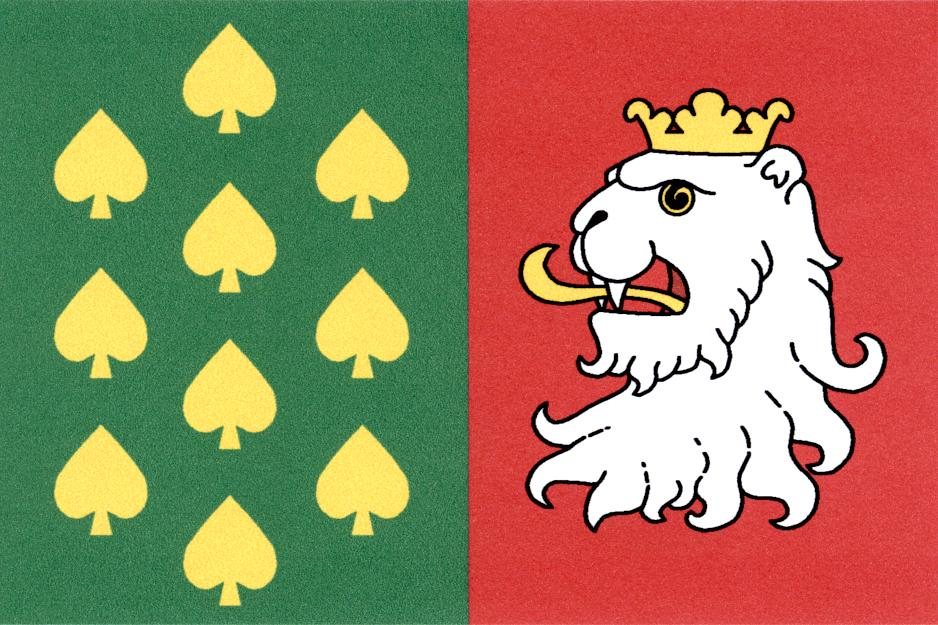
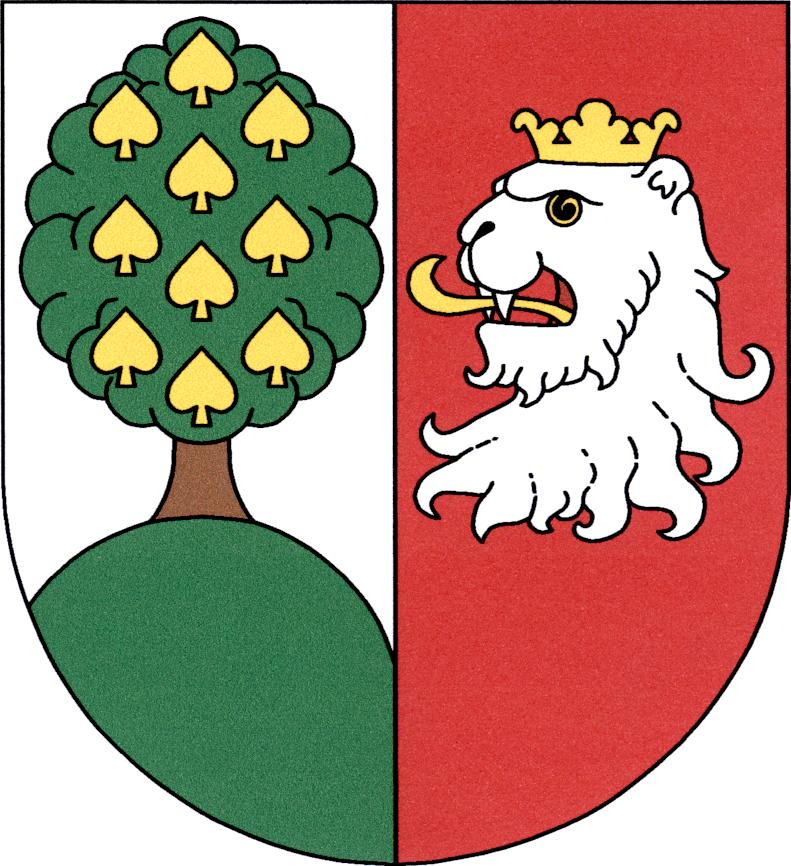
- Flag Coat of arms

- Location in the Czech Republic
- Coordinates: 50°32′36″N 14°38′19″E
- Country: Czech Republic
- Region: Liberec
- District: Česká Lípa
- First mentioned: 1460

Area
  - Total: 4.58 km^{2} (1.77 sq mi)
- Elevation: 333 m (1,093 ft)

Population (2026-01-01)
  - Total: 222
  - Density: 48.5/km^{2} (126/sq mi)
- Time zone: UTC+1 (CET)
  - Summer (DST): UTC+2 (CEST)
- Postal code: 472 01
- Website: www.obectachov.cz

Tachov is a municipality and village in Česká Lípa District in the Liberec Region of the Czech Republic. It has about 200 inhabitants.

== Demographics ==
Historical population
Year	Pop.	±%
1869	251	—
1880	212	−15.5%
1890	250	+17.9%
1900	224	−10.4%
1910	218	−2.7%
1921	209	−4.1%
1930	222	+6.2%
1950	156	−29.7%
1961	165	+5.8%
1970	102	−38.2%
1980	85	−16.7%
1991	77	−9.4%
2001	103	+33.8%
2011	191	+85.4%
2021	198	+3.7%
Source: Censuses
