= Slunečná =

- Municipality
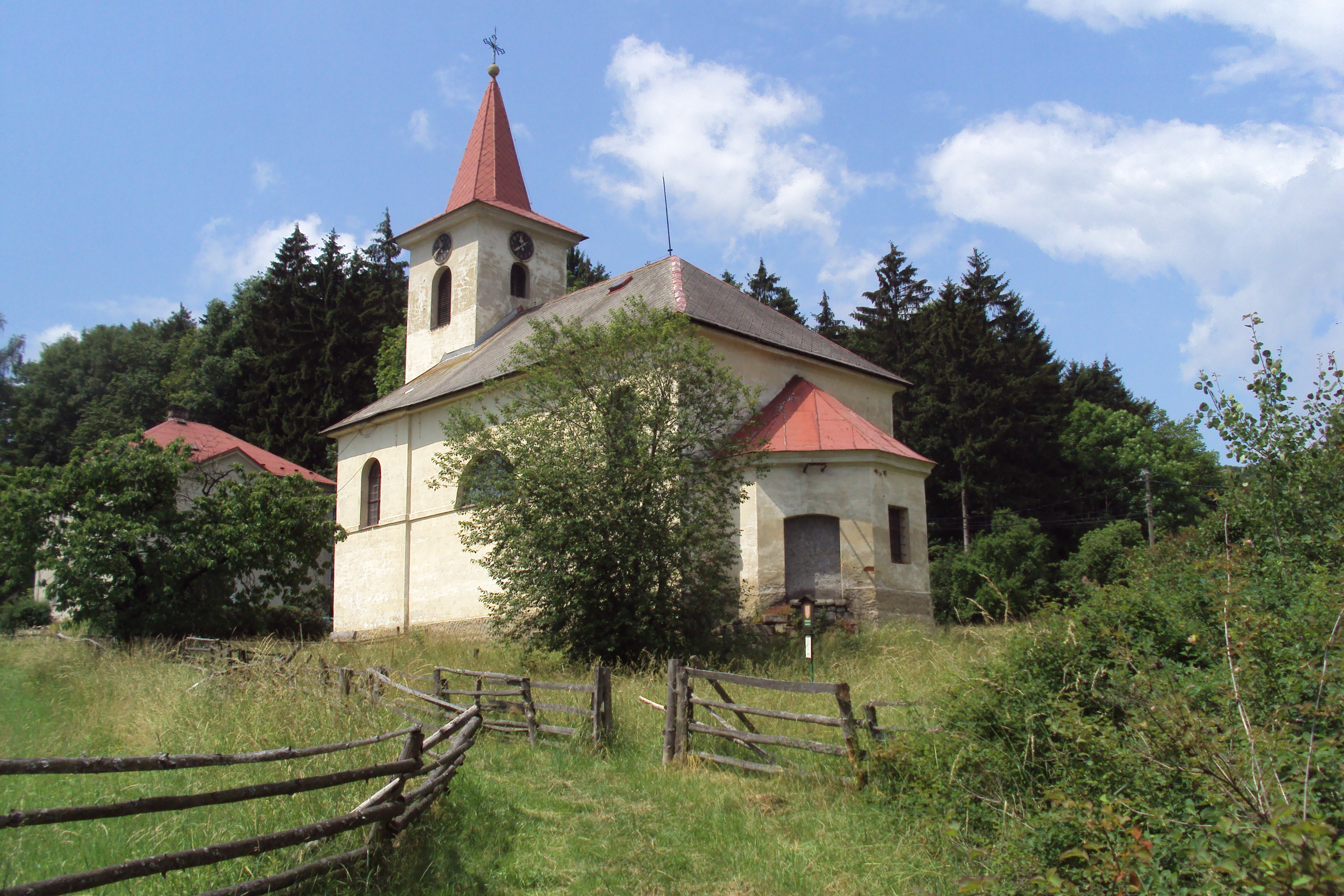
- Church of the Assumption of the Virgin Mary

- Flag Coat of arms

- Location in the Czech Republic
- Coordinates: 50°44′9″N 14°28′57″E
- Country: Czech Republic
- Region: Liberec
- District: Česká Lípa
- First mentioned: 1597

Area
  - Total: 6.13 km^{2} (2.37 sq mi)
- Elevation: 385 m (1,263 ft)

Population (2026-01-01)
  - Total: 153
  - Density: 25.0/km^{2} (64.6/sq mi)
- Time zone: UTC+1 (CET)
  - Summer (DST): UTC+2 (CEST)
- Postal code: 471 02
- Website: www.obecslunecna.cz

Slunečná (until 1949 Sonneberk; German: Sonneberg) is a municipality and village in Česká Lípa District in the Liberec Region of the Czech Republic. It has about 200 inhabitants.

== History ==
The first written mention of Slunečná is from 1597.

== Demographics ==
Historical population
Year	Pop.	±%
1869	594	—
1880	584	−1.7%
1890	509	−12.8%
1900	494	−2.9%
1910	442	−10.5%
1921	369	−16.5%
1930	395	+7.0%
1950	226	−42.8%
1961	146	−35.4%
1970	119	−18.5%
1980	91	−23.5%
1991	48	−47.3%
2001	60	+25.0%
2011	121	+101.7%
2021	144	+19.0%
Source: Censuses
