= Radvanec =

- Municipality
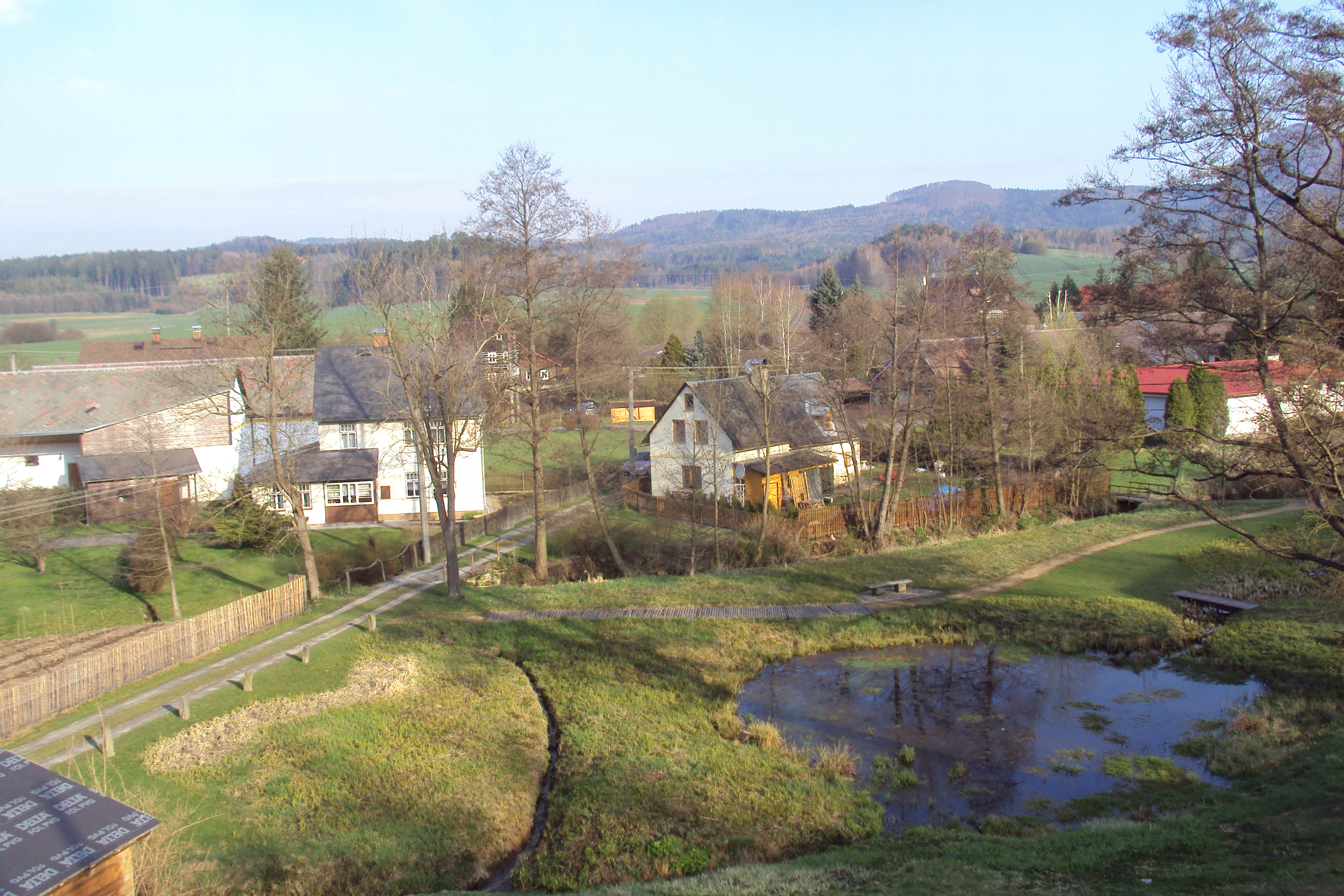
- General view

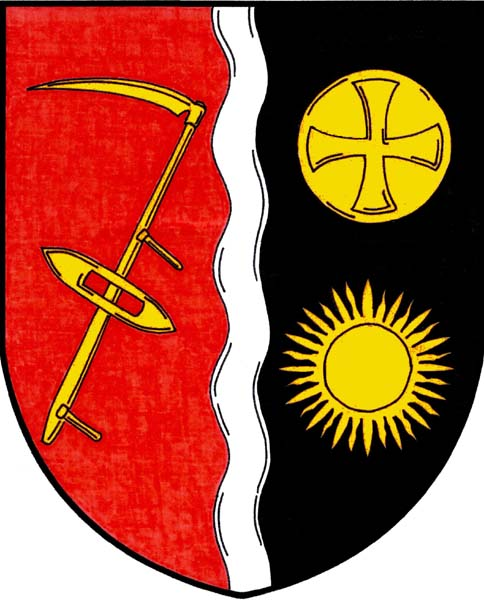
- Flag Coat of arms

- Location in the Czech Republic
- Coordinates: 50°45′11″N 14°35′32″E
- Country: Czech Republic
- Region: Liberec
- District: Česká Lípa
- First mentioned: 1384

Area
  - Total: 8.82 km^{2} (3.41 sq mi)
- Elevation: 305 m (1,001 ft)

Population (2026-01-01)
  - Total: 289
  - Density: 32.8/km^{2} (84.9/sq mi)
- Time zone: UTC+1 (CET)
  - Summer (DST): UTC+2 (CEST)
- Postal code: 473 01
- Website: www.radvanec.cz

Radvanec (German: Rodowitz) is a municipality and village in Česká Lípa District in the Liberec Region of the Czech Republic. It has about 300 inhabitants.

== Administrative division ==
Radvanec consists of two municipal parts (in brackets population according to the 2021 census):

- Radvanec (167)
- Maxov (90)

== Demographics ==
Historical population
Year	Pop.	±%
1869	803	—
1880	797	−0.7%
1890	768	−3.6%
1900	740	−3.6%
1910	745	+0.7%
1921	638	−14.4%
1930	666	+4.4%
1950	319	−52.1%
1961	275	−13.8%
1970	203	−26.2%
1980	136	−33.0%
1991	83	−39.0%
2001	104	+25.3%
2011	154	+48.1%
2021	257	+66.9%
Source: Censuses
