= Skalka u Doks =

- Municipality
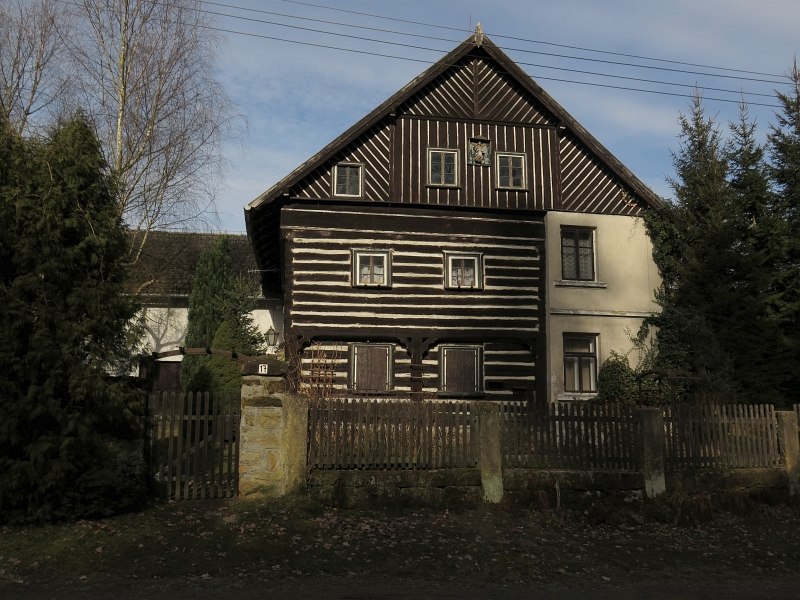
- Homestead No. 14

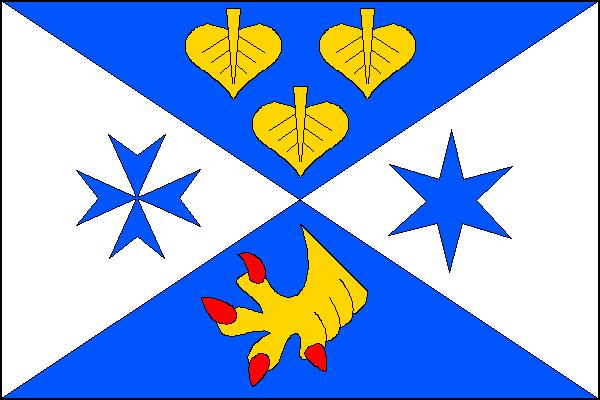
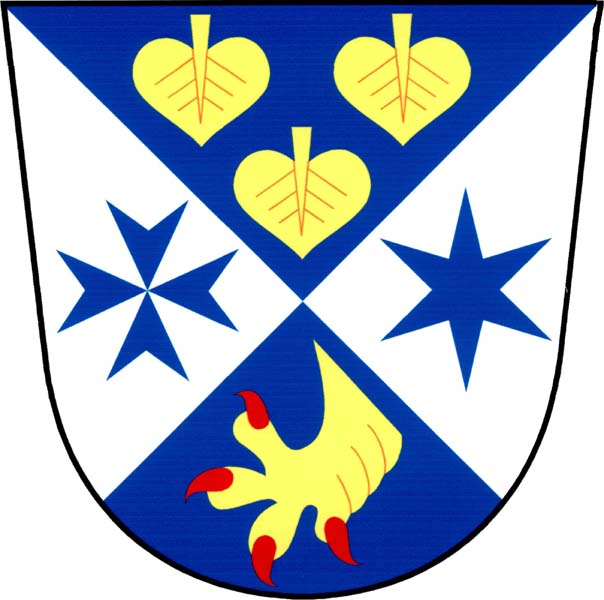
- Flag Coat of arms

- Location in the Czech Republic
- Coordinates: 50°33′49″N 14°37′11″E
- Country: Czech Republic
- Region: Liberec
- District: Česká Lípa
- First mentioned: 1348

Area
  - Total: 5.04 km^{2} (1.95 sq mi)
- Elevation: 335 m (1,099 ft)

Population (2026-01-01)
  - Total: 176
  - Density: 34.9/km^{2} (90.4/sq mi)
- Time zone: UTC+1 (CET)
  - Summer (DST): UTC+2 (CEST)
- Postal code: 472 01
- Website: ouskalka.cz

Skalka u Doks is a municipality and village in Česká Lípa District in the Liberec Region of the Czech Republic. It has about 200 inhabitants.

== Demographics ==
Historical population
| Year | Pop. | ±% |
|---|---|---|
| 1869 | 399 | — |
| 1880 | 364 | −8.8% |
| 1890 | 297 | −18.4% |
| 1900 | 286 | −3.7% |
| 1910 | 271 | −5.2% |
| 1921 | 268 | −1.1% |
| 1930 | 273 | +1.9% |
| 1950 | 139 | −49.1% |
| 1961 | 139 | +0.0% |
| 1970 | 167 | +20.1% |
| 1980 | 112 | −32.9% |
| 1991 | 111 | −0.9% |
| 2001 | 128 | +15.3% |
| 2011 | 147 | +14.8% |
| 2021 | 168 | +14.3% |
Source: Censuses
