= Polevsko =

- Municipality
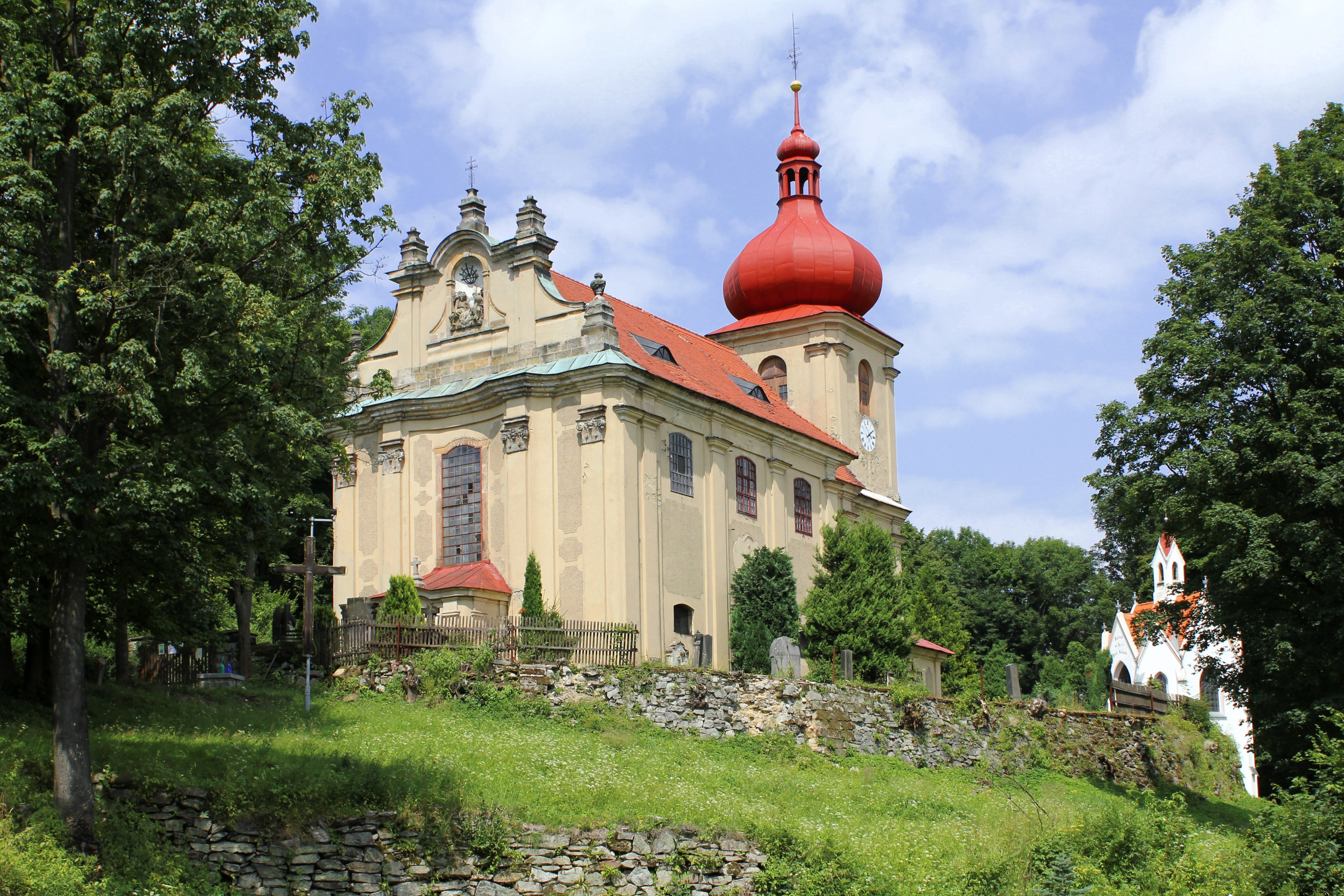
- Church of the Holy Trinity

- Flag Coat of arms

- Location in the Czech Republic
- Coordinates: 50°47′12″N 14°31′59″E
- Country: Czech Republic
- Region: Liberec
- District: Česká Lípa
- First mentioned: 1461

Area
  - Total: 4.44 km^{2} (1.71 sq mi)
- Elevation: 490 m (1,610 ft)

Population (2026-01-01)
  - Total: 435
  - Density: 98.0/km^{2} (254/sq mi)
- Time zone: UTC+1 (CET)
  - Summer (DST): UTC+2 (CEST)
- Postal code: 471 16
- Website: www.polevsko.info

Polevsko (German: Blottendorf) is a municipality and village in Česká Lípa District in the Liberec Region of the Czech Republic. It has about 400 inhabitants.

== Demographics ==
Historical population
Year	Pop.	±%
1869	1,422	—
1880	1,378	−3.1%
1890	1,346	−2.3%
1900	1,311	−2.6%
1910	1,306	−0.4%
1921	1,112	−14.9%
1930	1,316	+18.3%
1950	403	−69.4%
1961	465	+15.4%
1970	357	−23.2%
1980	470	+31.7%
1991	259	−44.9%
2001	305	+17.8%
2011	364	+19.3%
2021	445	+22.3%
Source: Censuses
