= Vrchovany =

- Municipality
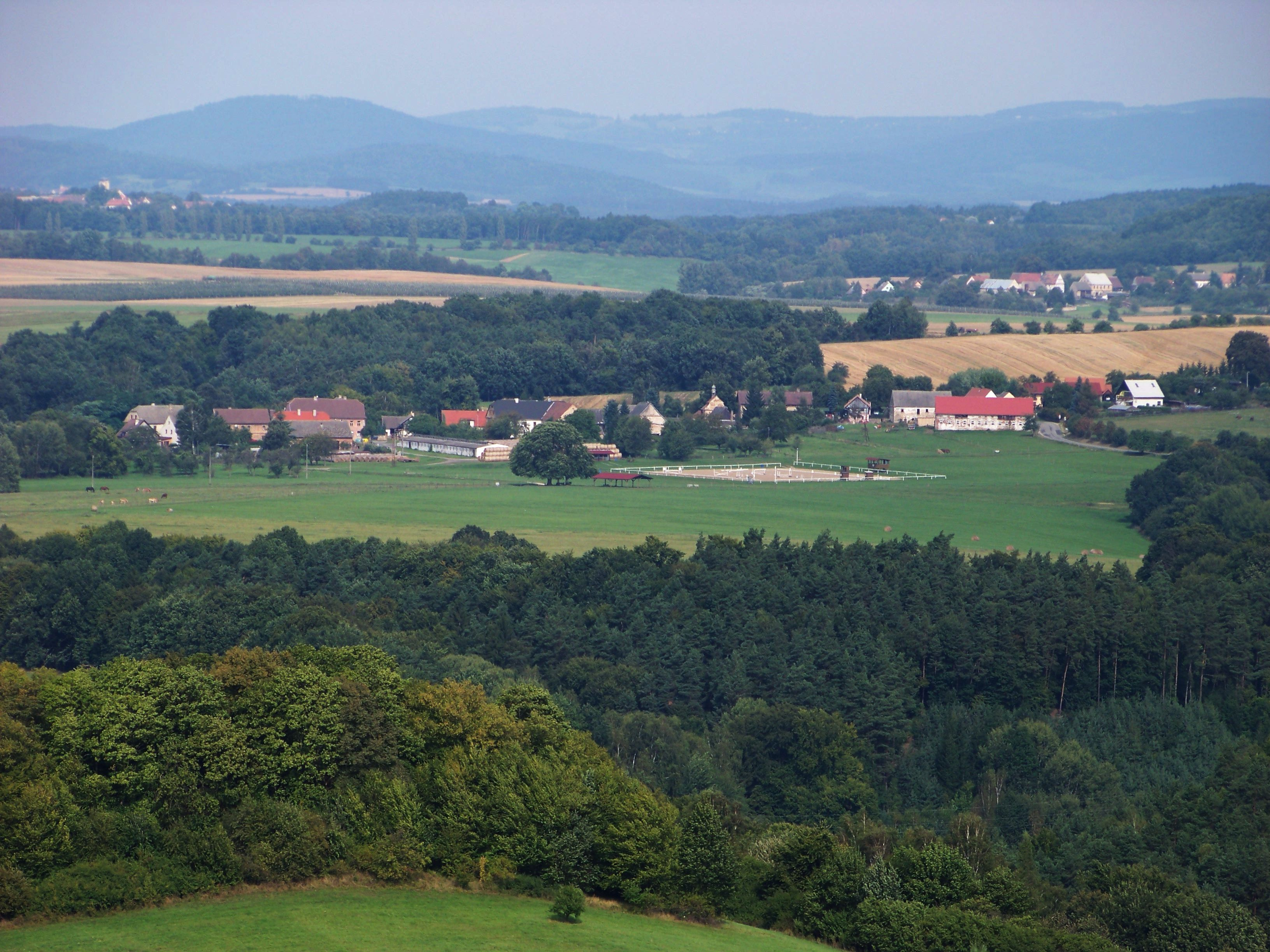
- View from the south

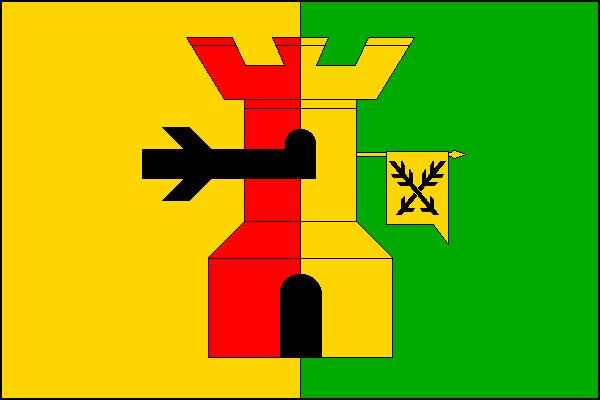
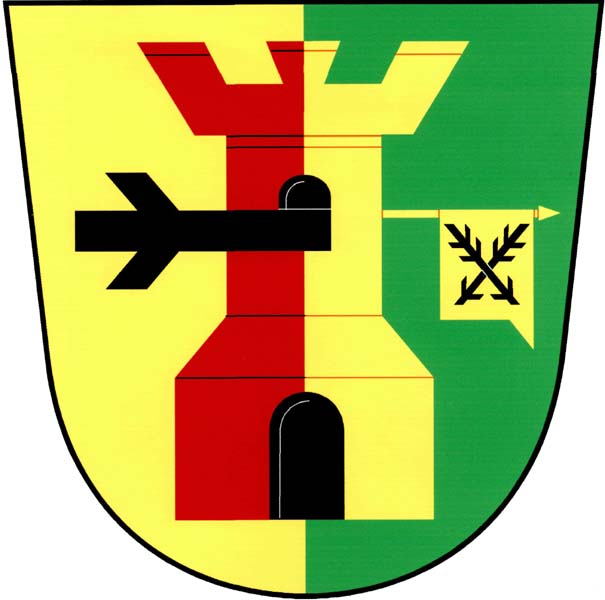
- Flag Coat of arms

- Location in the Czech Republic
- Coordinates: 50°33′12″N 14°34′16″E
- Country: Czech Republic
- Region: Liberec
- District: Česká Lípa
- First mentioned: 1402

Area
  - Total: 4.69 km^{2} (1.81 sq mi)
- Elevation: 332 m (1,089 ft)

Population (2026-01-01)
  - Total: 123
  - Density: 26.2/km^{2} (67.9/sq mi)
- Time zone: UTC+1 (CET)
  - Summer (DST): UTC+2 (CEST)
- Postal code: 472 01
- Website: obecvrchovany.cz

Vrchovany is a municipality and village in Česká Lípa District in the Liberec Region of the Czech Republic. It has about 100 inhabitants.

== Demographics ==
Historical population
Year	Pop.	±%
1869	308	—
1880	331	+7.5%
1890	294	−11.2%
1900	263	−10.5%
1910	235	−10.6%
1921	235	+0.0%
1930	211	−10.2%
1950	154	−27.0%
1961	141	−8.4%
1970	117	−17.0%
1980	97	−17.1%
1991	90	−7.2%
2001	96	+6.7%
2011	116	+20.8%
2021	107	−7.8%
Source: Censuses
