= Česká Lípa District =

Česká Lípa District Okres Česká Lípa
- District
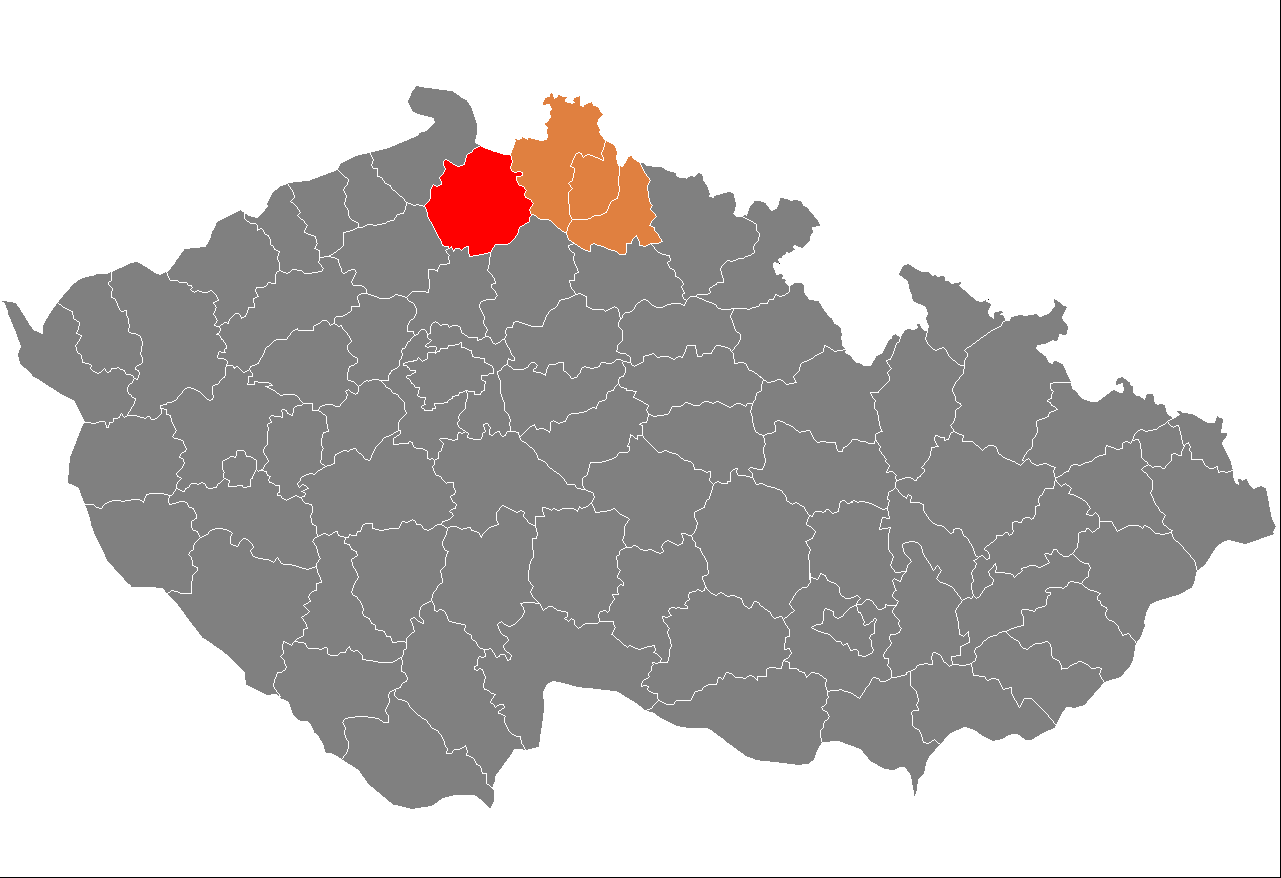
- Location in the Liberec Region within the Czech Republic

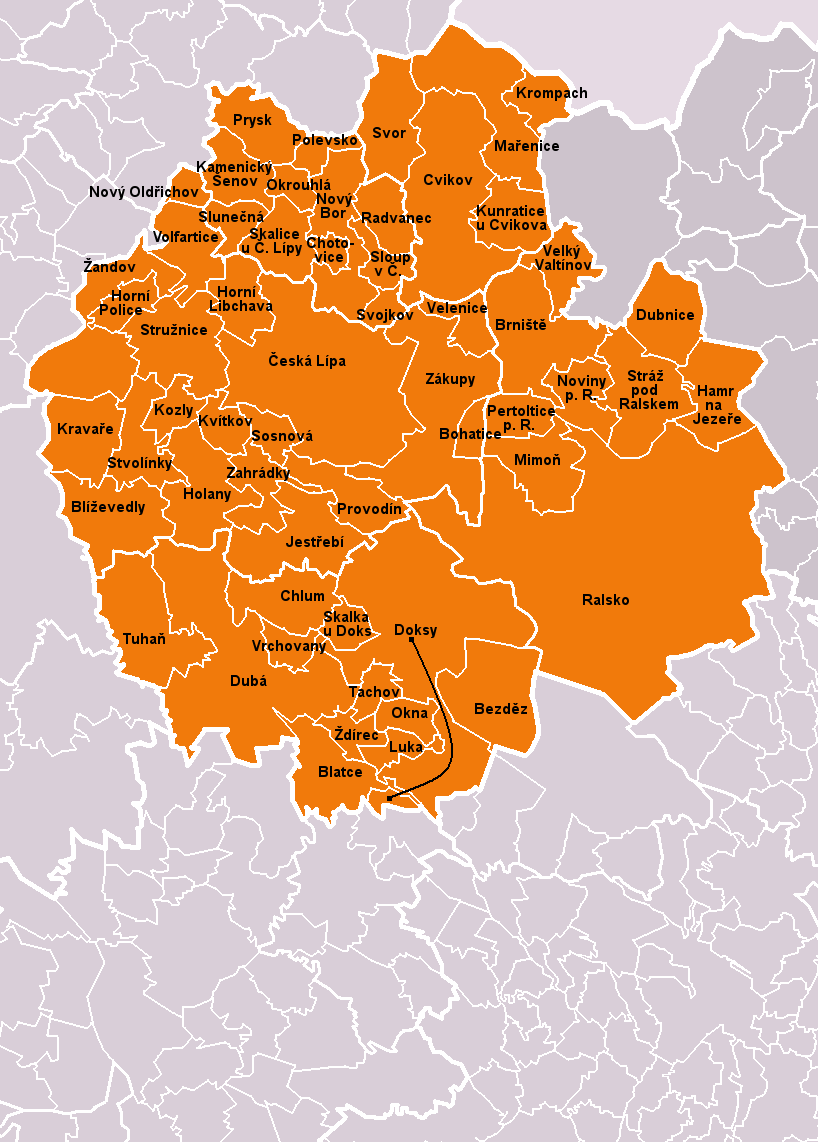
- Coordinates: 50°39′N 14°38′E
- Country: Czech Republic
- Region: Liberec
- Capital: Česká Lípa

Area
  - Total: 1,072.87 km^{2} (414.24 sq mi)

Population (2026)
  - Total: 102,204
  - Density: 95.2622/km^{2} (246.728/sq mi)
- Time zone: UTC+1 (CET)
  - Summer (DST): UTC+2 (CEST)
- Municipalities: 57
- * Towns: 11
- * Market towns: 1

Česká Lípa District (Czech: okres Česká Lípa) is a district in the Liberec Region of the Czech Republic. Its capital is the town of Česká Lípa.

== Administrative division ==
Česká Lípa District is divided into two administrative districts of municipalities with extended competence: Česká Lípa and Nový Bor.

=== List of municipalities ===
Towns are marked in bold and market towns in italics:

Bezděz - Blatce - Blíževedly - Bohatice - Brniště - Česká Lípa - Chlum - Chotovice - Cvikov - Doksy - Dubá - Dubnice - Hamr na Jezeře - Holany - Horní Libchava - Horní Police - Jestřebí - Kamenický Šenov - Kozly - Kravaře - Krompach - Kunratice u Cvikova - Kvítkov - Luka - Mařenice - Mimoň - Noviny pod Ralskem - Nový Bor - Nový Oldřichov - Okna - Okrouhlá - Pertoltice pod Ralskem - Polevsko - Provodín - Prysk - Radvanec - Ralsko - Skalice u České Lípy - Skalka u Doks - Sloup v Čechách - Slunečná - Sosnová - Stráž pod Ralskem - Stružnice - Stvolínky - Svojkov - Svor - Tachov - Tuhaň - Velenice - Velký Valtinov - Volfartice - Vrchovany - Zahrádky - Zákupy - Žandov - Ždírec

== Geography ==
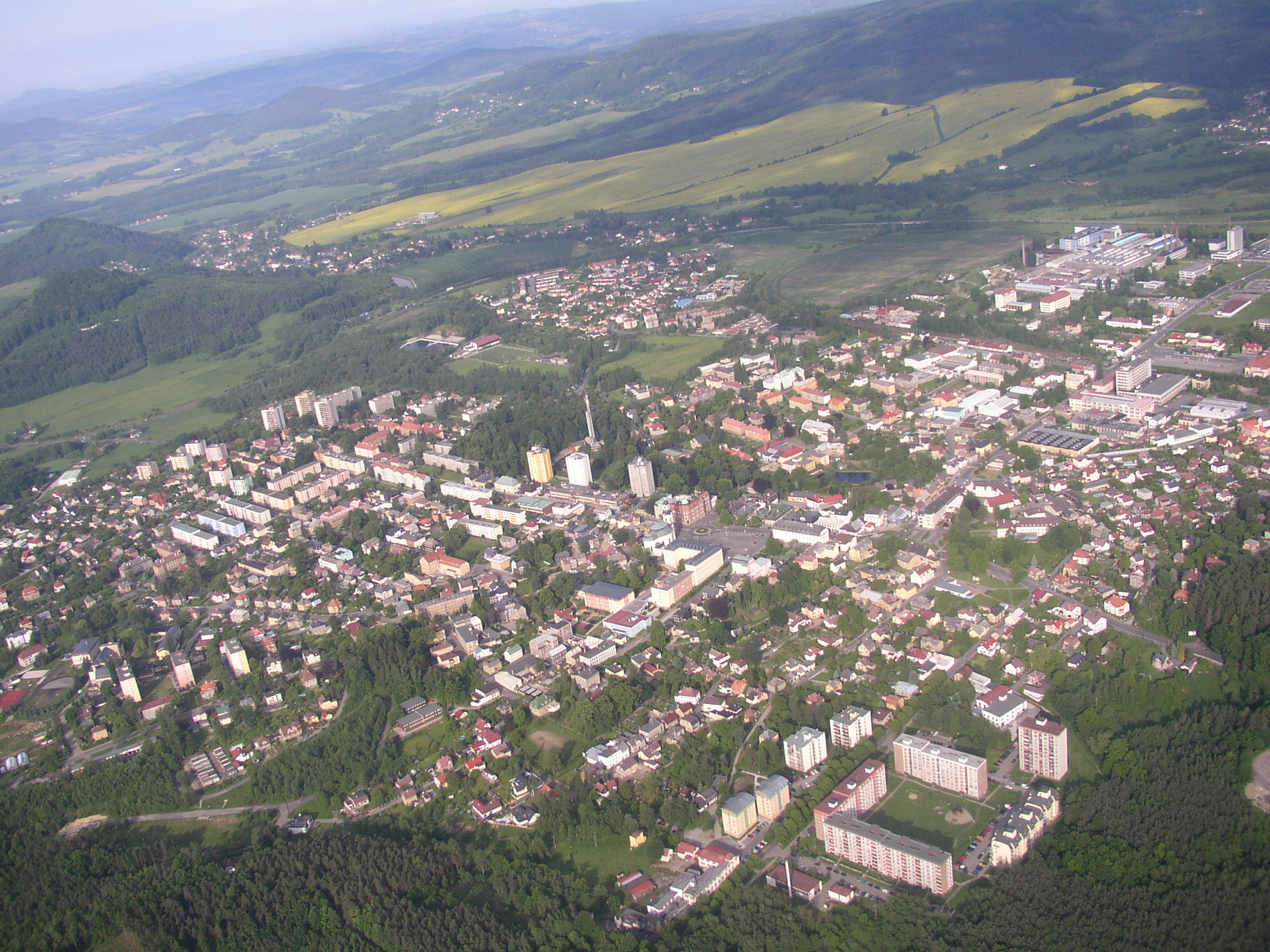
Nový Bor and surrounding landscape

Česká Lípa District briefly borders Germany in the north. The terrain is very diverse, with large differences in altitude, and hilly landscape prevails. The territory extends into four geomorphological mesoregions: Ralsko Uplands (most of the territory), Central Bohemian Uplands (west), Lusatian Mountains (north) and Jizera Table (small part in the southeast). The highest point of the district is the mountain Luž in Mařenice with an elevation of 793 m (2,602 ft), the lowest point is the river bed of the Liběchovka Stream in Dubá at 222 m (728 ft).

From the total district area of 1,072.9 km^{2} (414.2 sq mi), agricultural land occupies 430.8 km^{2} (166.3 sq mi), forests occupy 506.6 km^{2} (195.6 sq mi), and water area occupies 25.8 km^{2} (10.0 sq mi). Forests cover 47.2% of the district's area.

The most significant river is the Ploučnice, which flows across the district from east to west. Its longest tributary in the district is the Svitavka. The largest body of water is Lake Mácha.

There are three protected landscape areas: Lužické hory, České středohoří and Kokořínsko – Máchův kraj.

== Demographics ==
Historical population

Year	Pop.	±%
1869	114,587	—
1880	116,883	+2.0%
1890	113,646	−2.8%
1900	111,892	−1.5%
1910	113,134	+1.1%

Year	Pop.	±%
1921	106,777	−5.6%
1930	115,536	+8.2%
1950	74,275	−35.7%
1961	74,588	+0.4%
1970	74,814	+0.3%

Year	Pop.	±%
1980	85,614	+14.4%
1991	98,348	+14.9%
2001	101,895	+3.6%
2011	100,756	−1.1%
2021	100,959	+0.2%

Source: Censuses

=== Most populous municipalities ===
Name	Population	Area (km^{2})
Česká Lípa	36,364	66
Nový Bor	11,257	19
Mimoň	6,321	15
Doksy	5,121	75
Cvikov	4,520	45
Kamenický Šenov	3,791	10
Stráž pod Ralskem	3,773	22
Zákupy	2,907	41
Ralsko	2,209	170
Žandov	1,915	27

== Economy ==
The largest employers with headquarters in Česká Lípa District and at least 500 employees are:

Economic entity	Location	Number of employees	Main activity
Diamo	Stráž pod Ralskem	3,000–3,999	Landscape rehabilitation and reclamation
Adient Czech Republic	Česká Lípa	2,500–2,999	Manufacture of parts for motor vehicles
Fehrer Bohemia	Česká Lípa	2,000–2,499	Manufacture of parts for motor vehicles
Nemocnice s poliklinikou Česká Lípa	Česká Lípa	1,000–1,499	Health care
Clarios Česká Lípa	Česká Lípa	500–999	Manufacture of batteries

== Transport ==
There are no motorways in the district territory. The most important roads that pass through the district are the I/13 (part of the European route E442) from Liberec to Karlovy Vary, and the I/9 from Prague to the Czech–German border via Česká Lípa.

== Sights ==
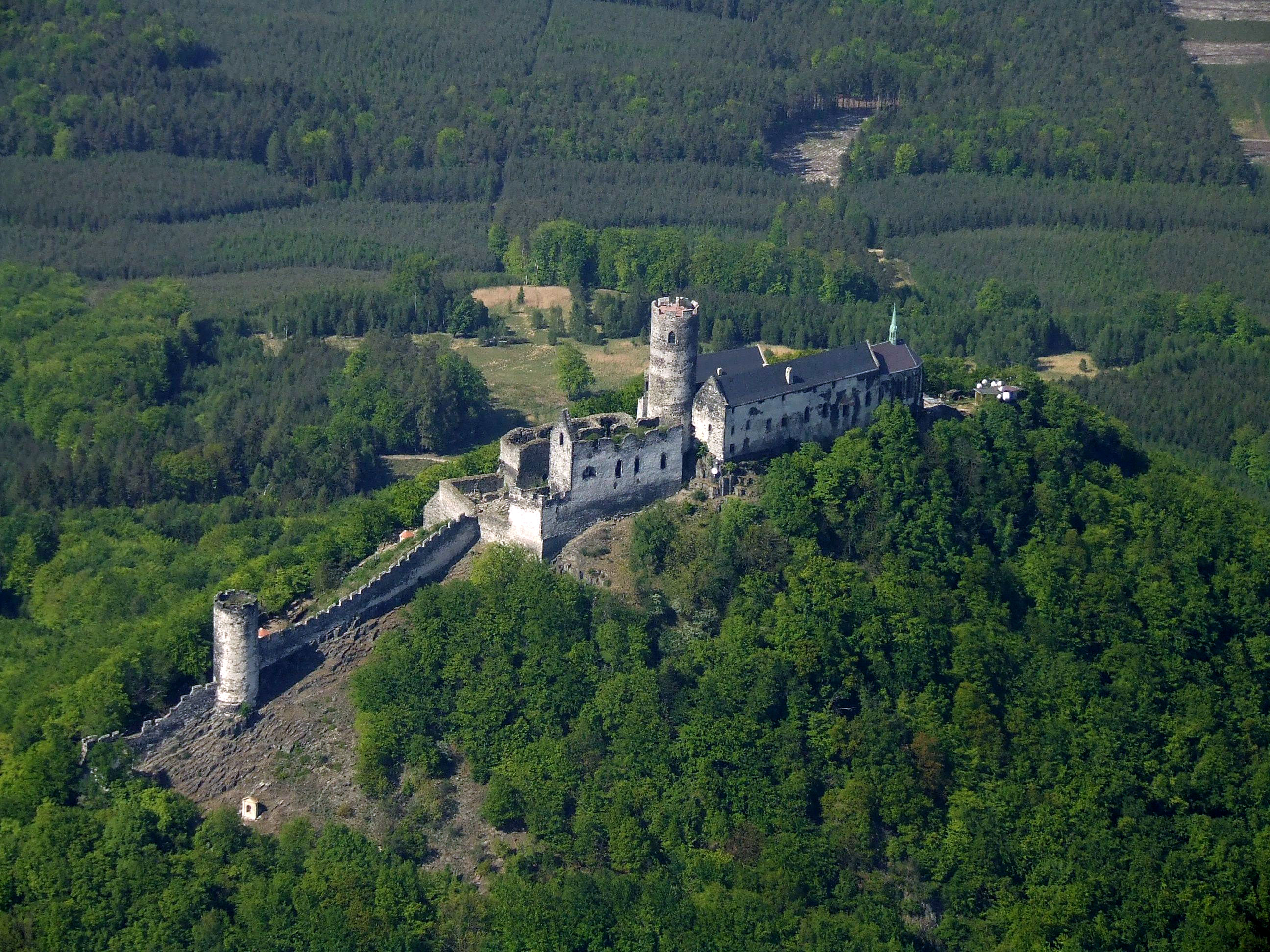
Bezděz Castle

The most important monuments in the district, protected as national cultural monuments, are:

- Bezděz Castle
- Zákupy Castle
- Pilgrimage complex with the Church of the Visitation of the Virgin Mary in Horní Police

The best-preserved settlements and landscapes, protected as monument reservations and monument zones, are:

- Janovice (monument reservation)
- Lhota (monument reservation)
- Rané (monument reservation)
- Žďár (monument reservation)
- Česká Lípa
- Dubá
- Kamenický Šenov
- Nový Bor
- Zákupy
- Bukovec
- Kravaře
- Kruh
- Pavlovice
- Sloup v Čechách
- Tubož
- Velenice
- Vojetín
- Zahrádecko landscape

The most visited tourist destinations are the Bezděz Castle and Sloup Castle.
