= Okna (Česká Lípa District) =

- Municipality
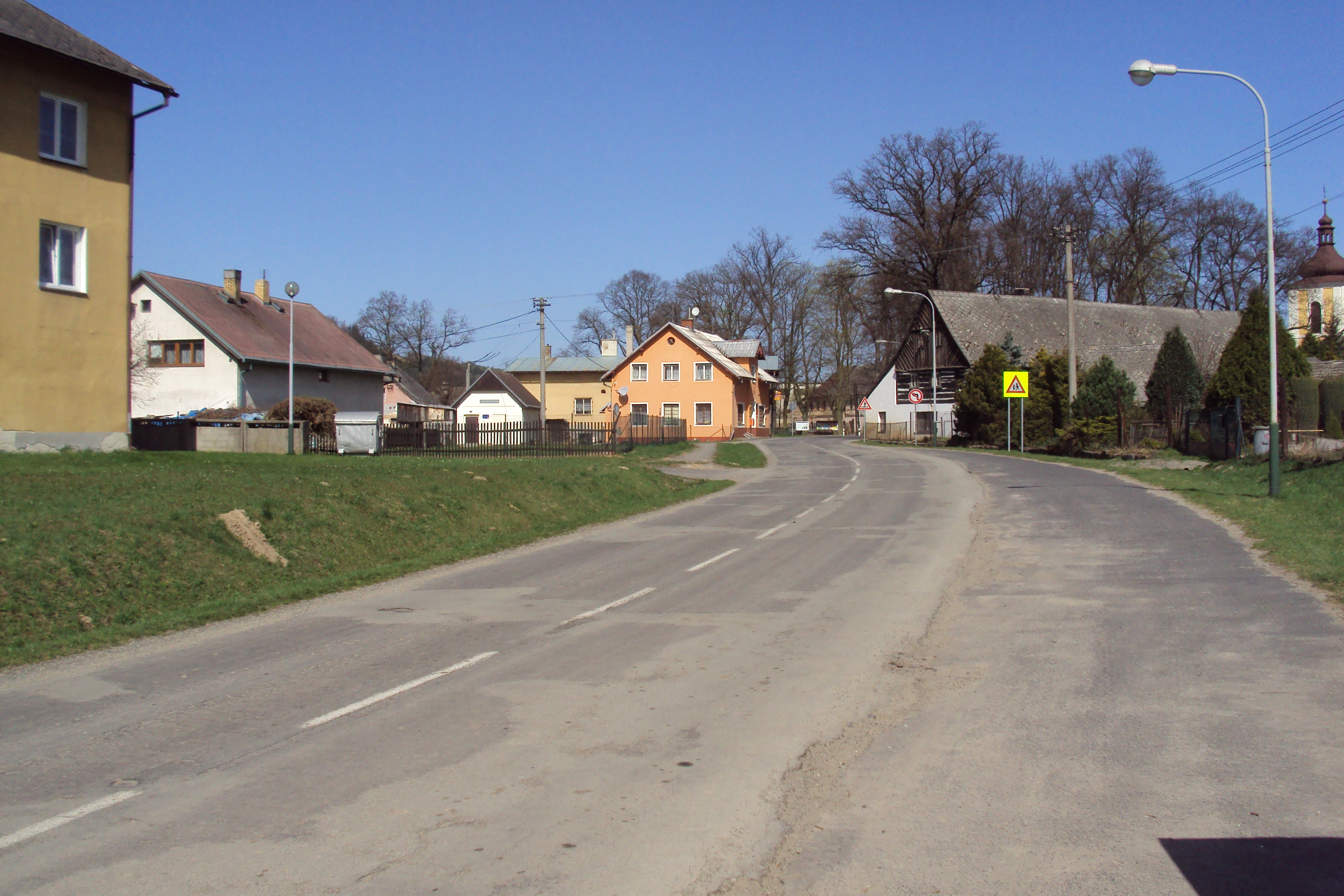
- Main road

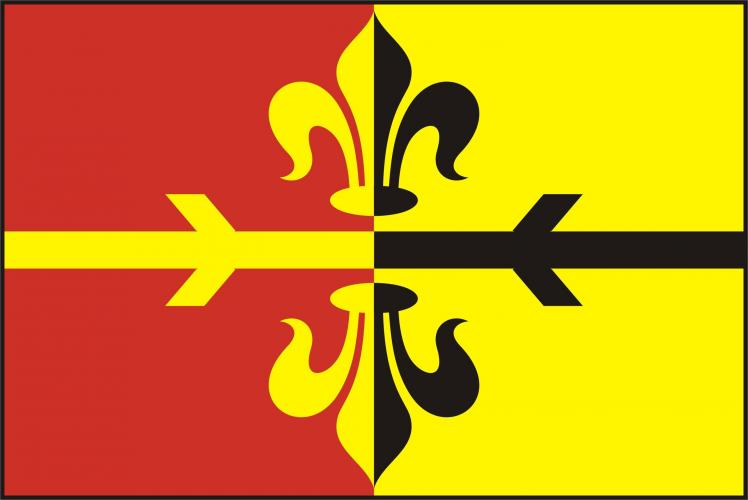
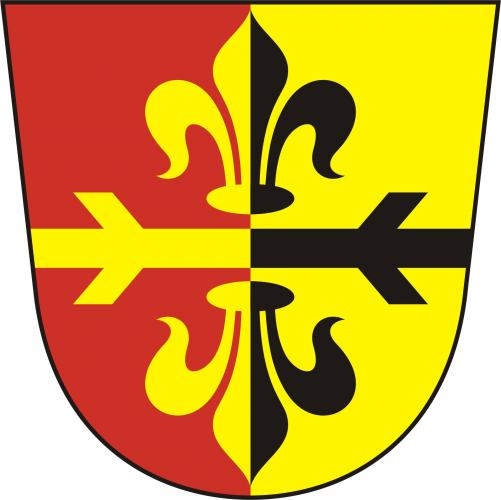
- Flag Coat of arms

- Location in the Czech Republic
- Coordinates: 50°31′39″N 14°40′16″E
- Country: Czech Republic
- Region: Liberec
- District: Česká Lípa
- First mentioned: 1352

Area
  - Total: 5.67 km^{2} (2.19 sq mi)
- Elevation: 282 m (925 ft)

Population (2026-01-01)
  - Total: 335
  - Density: 59.1/km^{2} (153/sq mi)
- Time zone: UTC+1 (CET)
  - Summer (DST): UTC+2 (CEST)
- Postal code: 471 62
- Website: obecokna.cz

Okna (German: Woken bei Hirschberg) is a municipality and village in Česká Lípa District in the Liberec Region of the Czech Republic. It has about 300 inhabitants.

== Demographics ==
Historical population
Year	Pop.	±%
1869	333	—
1880	351	+5.4%
1890	363	+3.4%
1900	392	+8.0%
1910	355	−9.4%
1921	364	+2.5%
1930	420	+15.4%
1950	312	−25.7%
1961	344	+10.3%
1970	290	−15.7%
1980	293	+1.0%
1991	266	−9.2%
2001	264	−0.8%
2011	309	+17.0%
2021	300	−2.9%
Source: Censuses
