= Okrouhlá (Česká Lípa District) =

- Municipality
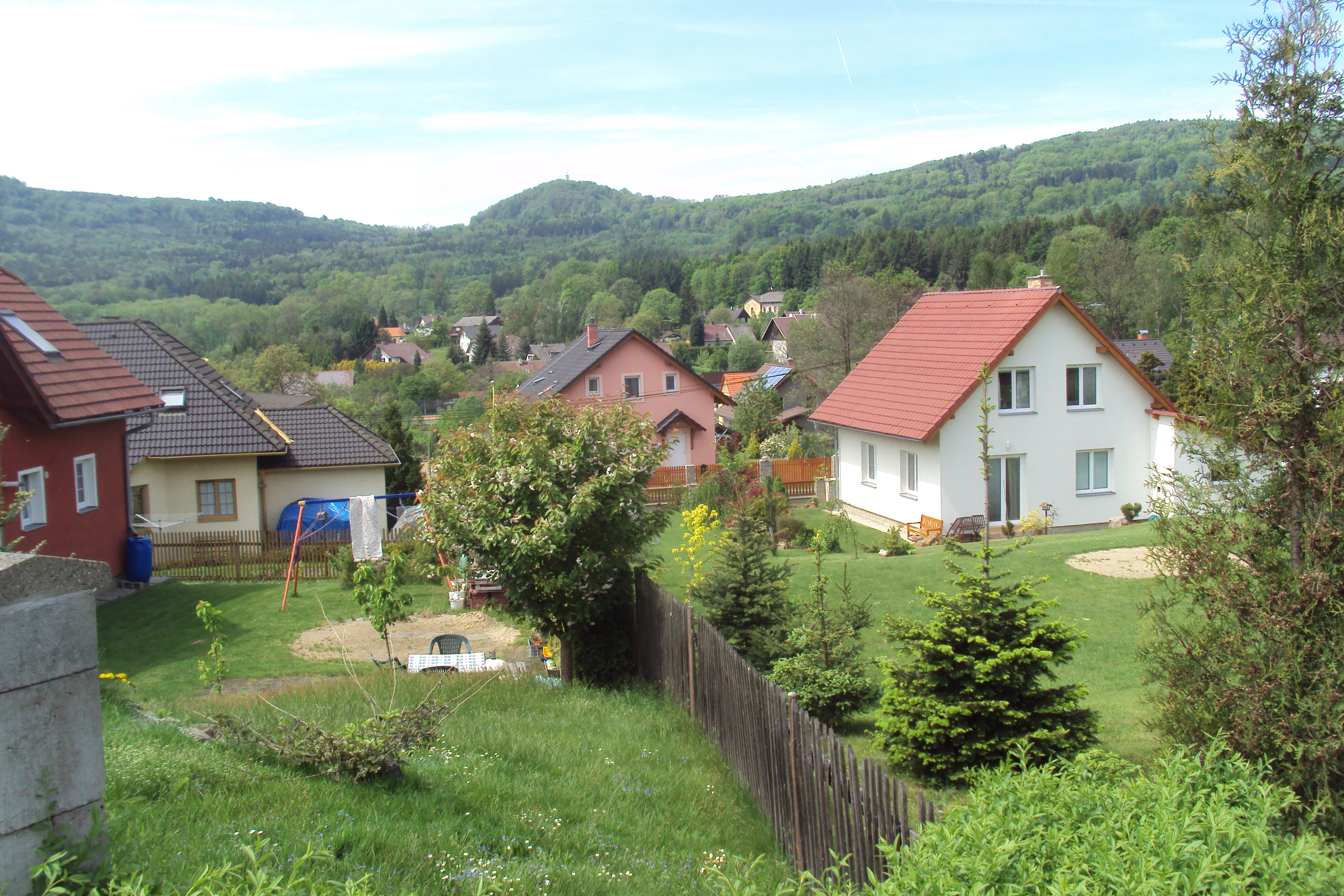
- Family houses in Okrouhlá

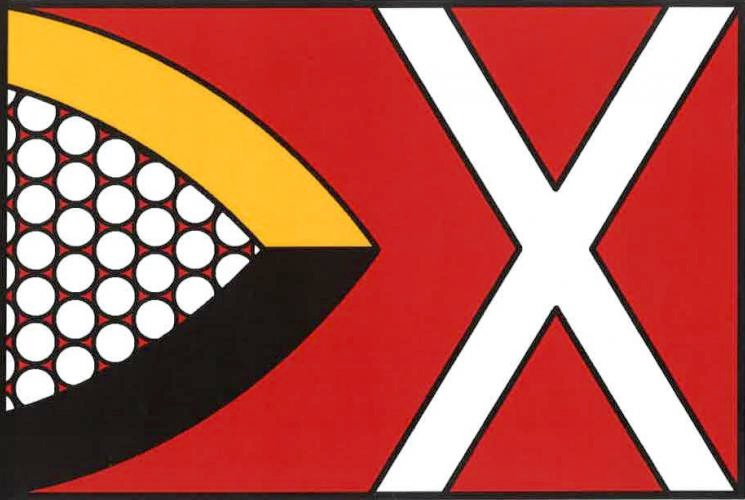
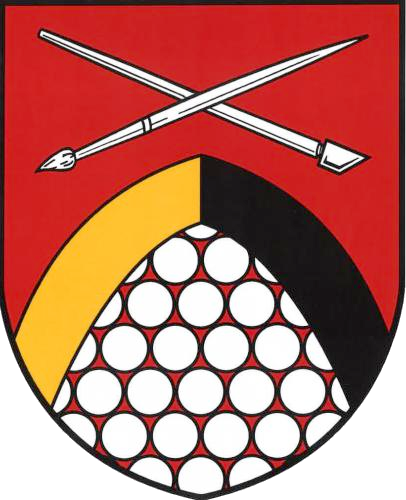
- Flag Coat of arms

- Location in the Czech Republic
- Coordinates: 50°46′0″N 14°31′40″E
- Country: Czech Republic
- Region: Liberec
- District: Česká Lípa
- First mentioned: 1543

Area
  - Total: 4.24 km^{2} (1.64 sq mi)
- Elevation: 385 m (1,263 ft)

Population (2026-01-01)
  - Total: 588
  - Density: 139/km^{2} (359/sq mi)
- Time zone: UTC+1 (CET)
  - Summer (DST): UTC+2 (CEST)
- Postal code: 473 01
- Website: www.ouokrouhla.cz

Okrouhlá is a municipality and village in Česká Lípa District in the Liberec Region of the Czech Republic. It has about 600 inhabitants.

== Demographics ==
Historical population
Year	Pop.	±%
1869	681	—
1880	674	−1.0%
1890	720	+6.8%
1900	680	−5.6%
1910	646	−5.0%
1921	574	−11.1%
1930	644	+12.2%
1950	389	−39.6%
1961	413	+6.2%
1970	352	−14.8%
1980	341	−3.1%
1991	401	+17.6%
2001	470	+17.2%
2011	508	+8.1%
2021	537	+5.7%
Source: Censuses
