= Kozly (Česká Lípa District) =

- Municipality
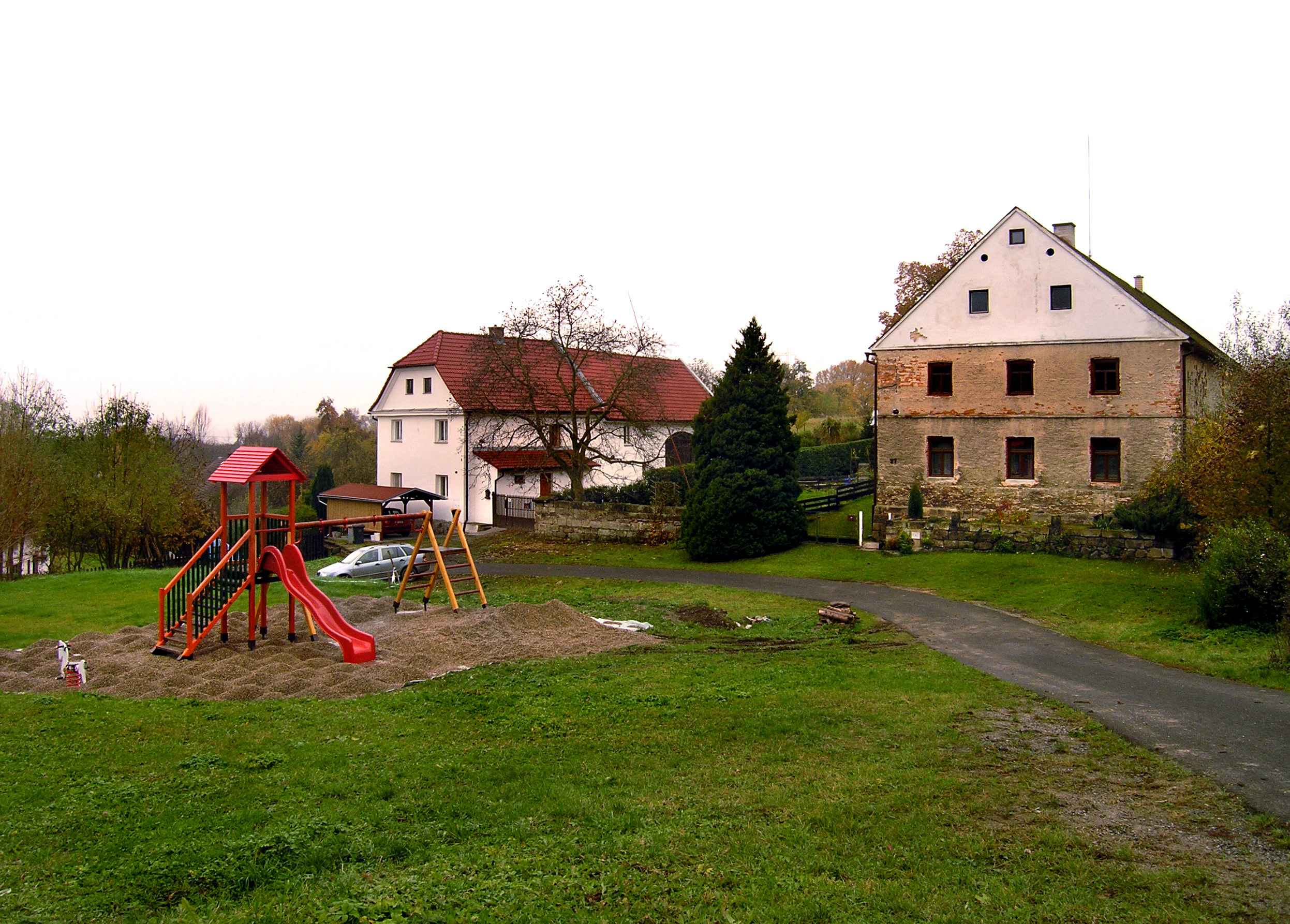
- Centre of Kozly

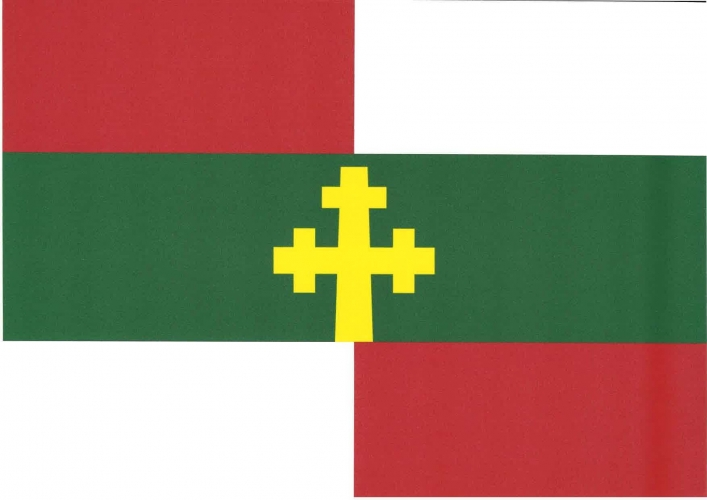
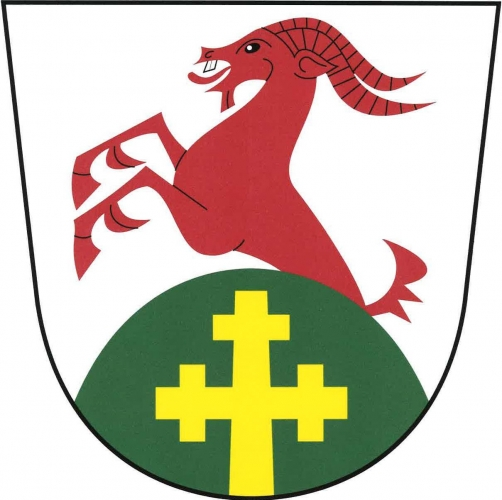
- Flag Coat of arms

- Location in the Czech Republic
- Coordinates: 50°39′20″N 14°27′25″E
- Country: Czech Republic
- Region: Liberec
- District: Česká Lípa
- First mentioned: 1371

Area
  - Total: 5.66 km^{2} (2.19 sq mi)
- Elevation: 395 m (1,296 ft)

Population (2026-01-01)
  - Total: 150
  - Density: 27/km^{2} (69/sq mi)
- Time zone: UTC+1 (CET)
  - Summer (DST): UTC+2 (CEST)
- Postal code: 470 01
- Website: oukozly.cz

Kozly is a municipality and village in Česká Lípa District in the Liberec Region of the Czech Republic. It has about 200 inhabitants.

== Demographics ==
Historical population
Year	Pop.	±%
1869	397	—
1880	399	+0.5%
1890	361	−9.5%
1900	342	−5.3%
1910	342	+0.0%
1921	350	+2.3%
1930	381	+8.9%
1950	181	−52.5%
1961	155	−14.4%
1970	156	+0.6%
1980	158	+1.3%
1991	119	−24.7%
2001	115	−3.4%
2011	140	+21.7%
2021	146	+4.3%
Source: Censuses
