= Prysk =

- Municipality
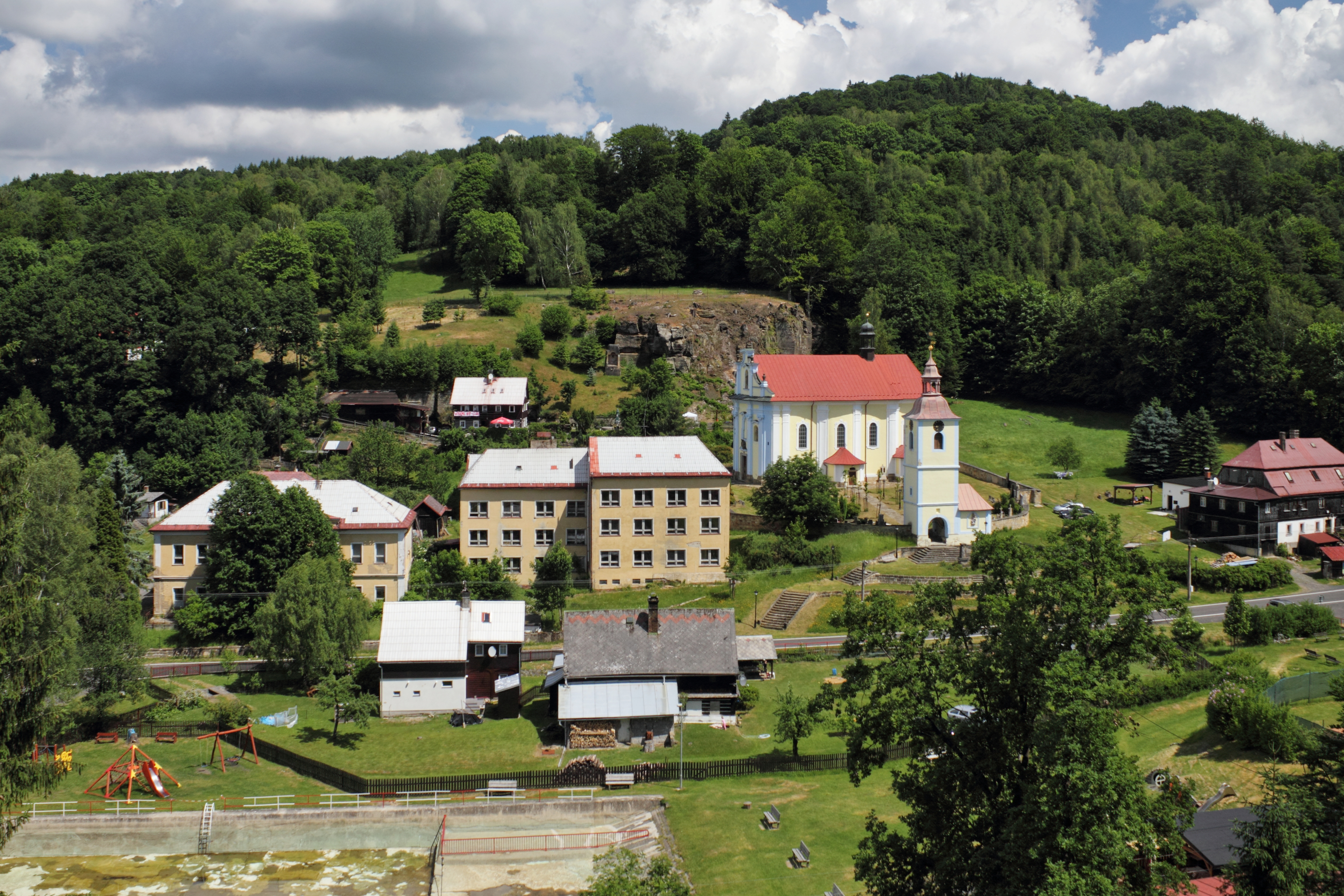
- Horní Prysk with the Church of Saints Peter and Paul

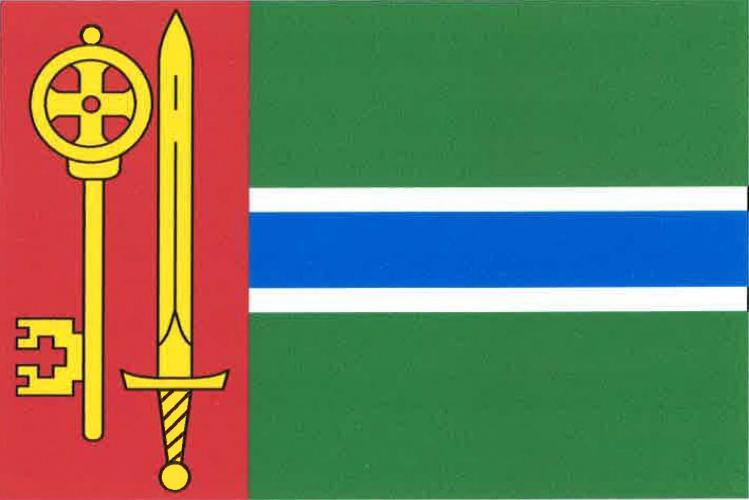
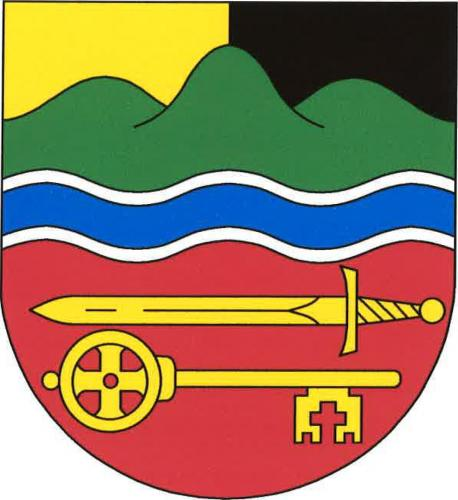
- Flag Coat of arms

- Location in the Czech Republic
- Coordinates: 50°47′46″N 14°28′4″E
- Country: Czech Republic
- Region: Liberec
- District: Česká Lípa
- First mentioned: 1382

Area
  - Total: 13.66 km^{2} (5.27 sq mi)
- Elevation: 435 m (1,427 ft)

Population (2026-01-01)
  - Total: 460
  - Density: 34/km^{2} (87/sq mi)
- Time zone: UTC+1 (CET)
  - Summer (DST): UTC+2 (CEST)
- Postal code: 471 15
- Website: www.prysk.cz

Prysk (German: Preschkau) is a municipality in Česká Lípa District in the Liberec Region of the Czech Republic. It has about 500 inhabitants.

== Administrative division ==
Prysk consists of three municipal parts (in brackets population according to the 2021 census):

- Dolní Prysk (177)
- Horní Prysk (177)
- Vesnička (105)

== History ==
The first written mention of Prysk is from 1382.

== Demographics ==
Historical population
Year	Pop.	±%
1869	1,686	—
1880	1,771	+5.0%
1890	1,771	+0.0%
1900	1,743	−1.6%
1910	1,946	+11.6%
1921	1,816	−6.7%
1930	1,996	+9.9%
1950	773	−61.3%
1961	674	−12.8%
1970	621	−7.9%
1980	497	−20.0%
1991	355	−28.6%
2001	385	+8.5%
2011	453	+17.7%
2021	459	+1.3%
Source: Censuses
