= Luka (Česká Lípa District) =

- Municipality
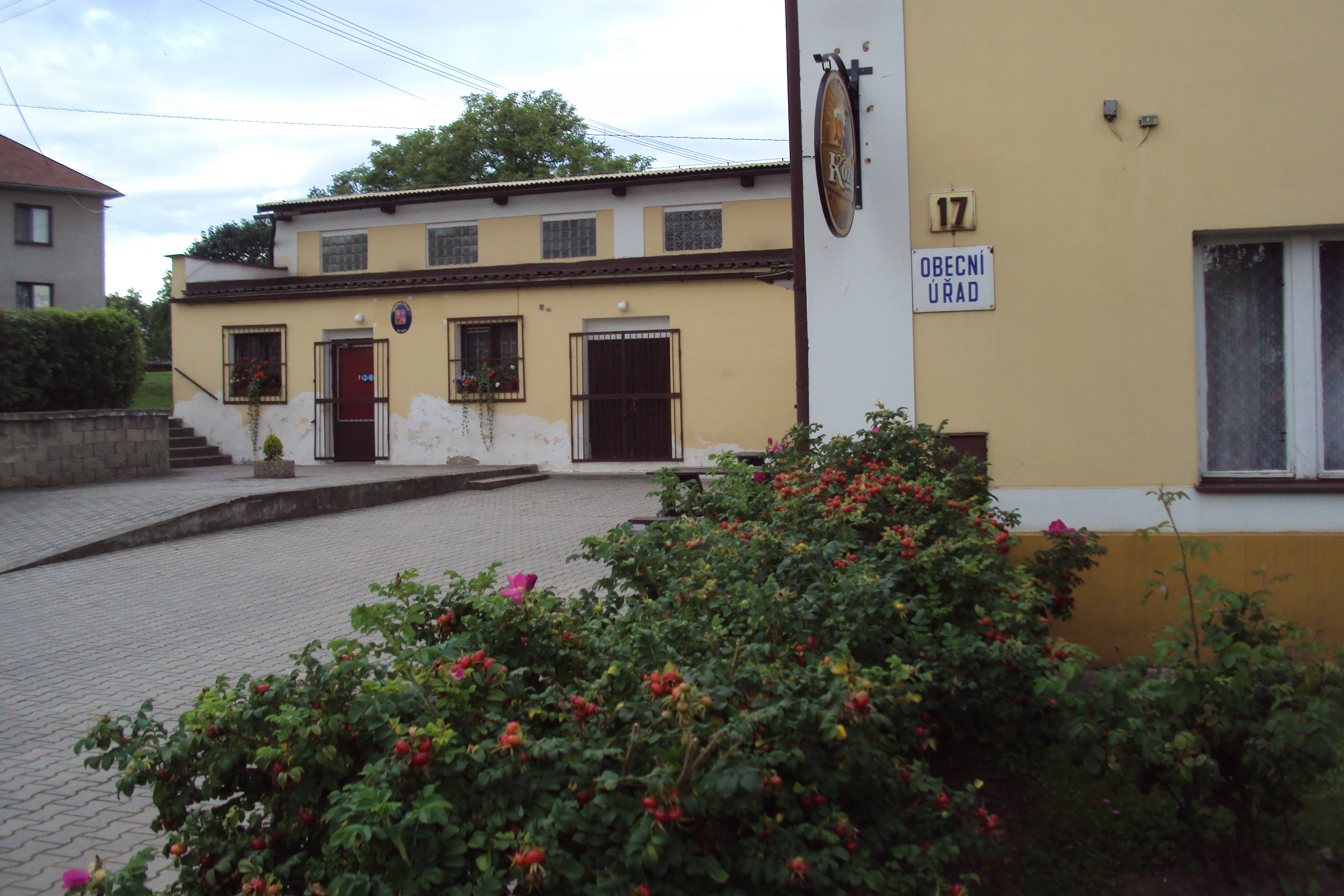
- Municipal office

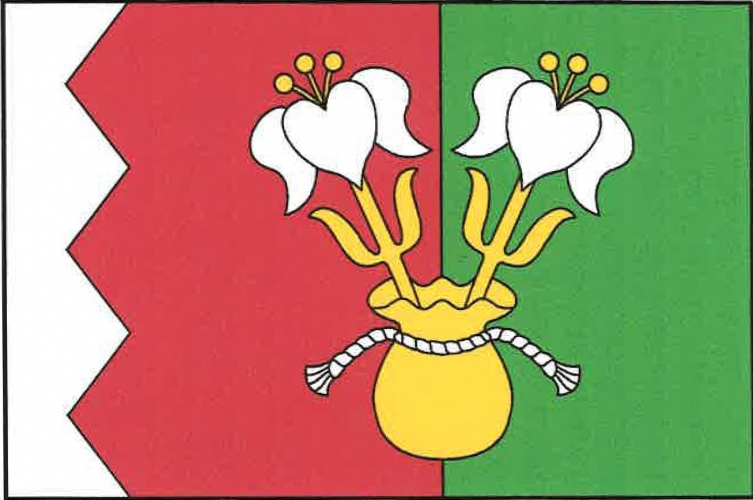
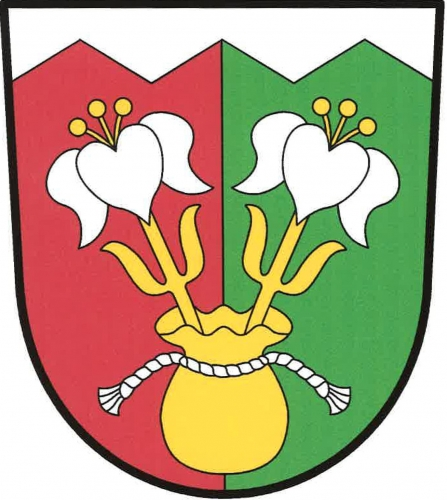
- Flag Coat of arms

- Location in the Czech Republic
- Coordinates: 50°30′45″N 14°39′51″E
- Country: Czech Republic
- Region: Liberec
- District: Česká Lípa
- First mentioned: 1348

Area
  - Total: 4.56 km^{2} (1.76 sq mi)
- Elevation: 330 m (1,080 ft)

Population (2026-01-01)
  - Total: 103
  - Density: 22.6/km^{2} (58.5/sq mi)
- Time zone: UTC+1 (CET)
  - Summer (DST): UTC+2 (CEST)
- Postal code: 472 01
- Website: obecluka.cz

Luka is a municipality and village in Česká Lípa District in the Liberec Region of the Czech Republic. It has about 100 inhabitants.

== Administrative division ==
Luka consists of two municipal parts (in brackets population according to the 2021 census):

- Luka (83)
- Týn (12)

== Demographics ==
Historical population
Year	Pop.	±%
1869	240	—
1880	244	+1.7%
1890	249	+2.0%
1900	188	−24.5%
1910	198	+5.3%
1921	180	−9.1%
1930	238	+32.2%
1950	178	−25.2%
1961	127	−28.7%
1970	93	−26.8%
1980	114	+22.6%
1991	100	−12.3%
2001	100	+0.0%
2011	91	−9.0%
2021	95	+4.4%
Source: Censuses
