= Bohatice =

- Municipality
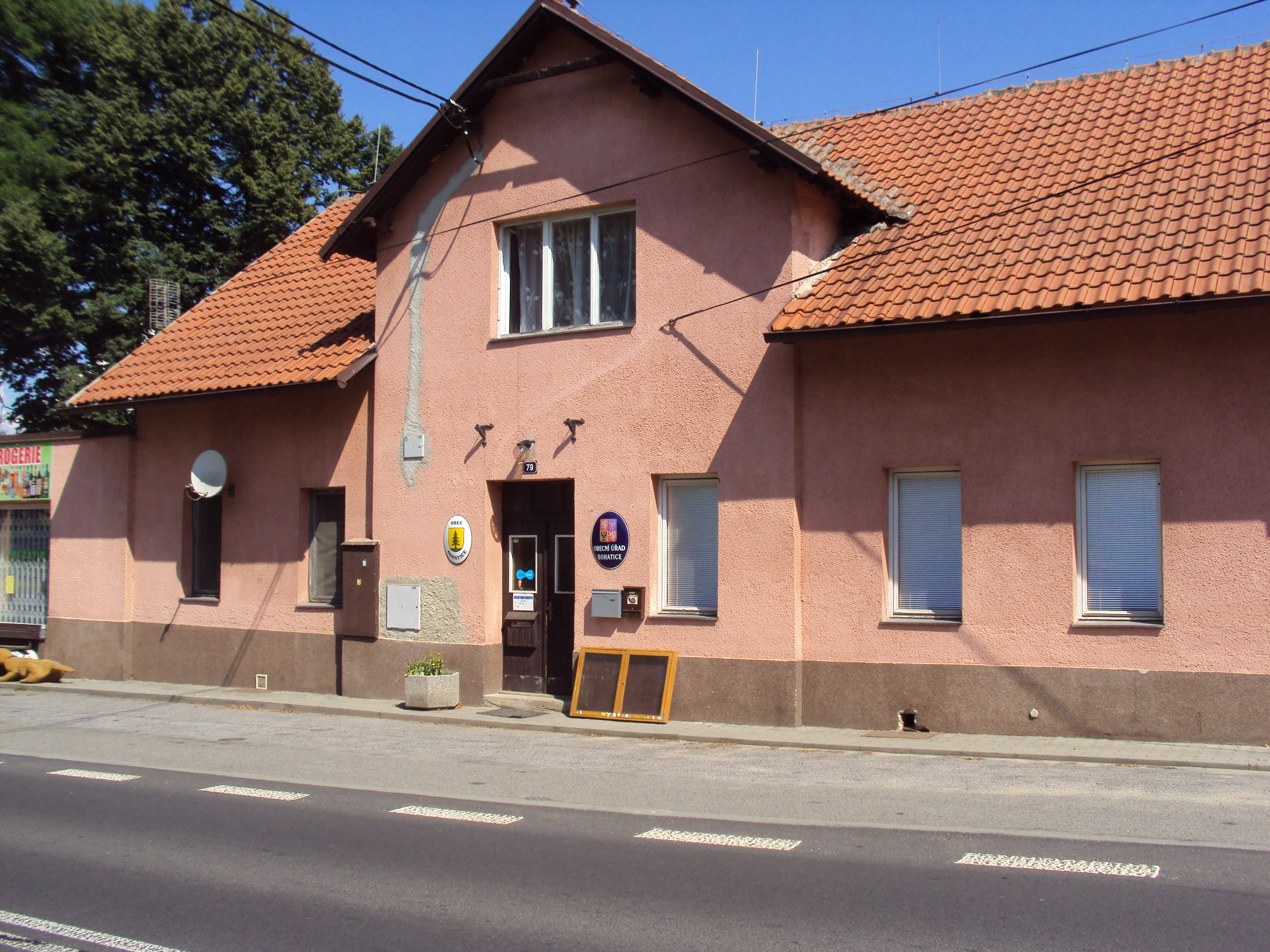
- Municipal office

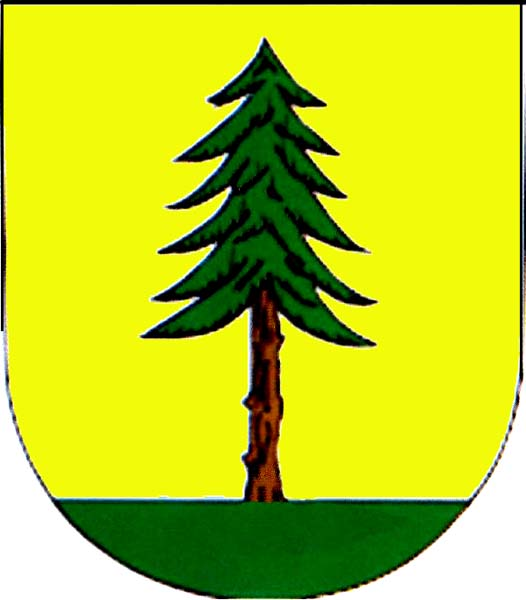
- Flag Coat of arms

- Location in the Czech Republic
- Coordinates: 50°40′8″N 14°40′46″E
- Country: Czech Republic
- Region: Liberec
- District: Česká Lípa
- First mentioned: 1304

Area
  - Total: 3.93 km^{2} (1.52 sq mi)
- Elevation: 287 m (942 ft)

Population (2026-01-01)
  - Total: 253
  - Density: 64.4/km^{2} (167/sq mi)
- Time zone: UTC+1 (CET)
  - Summer (DST): UTC+2 (CEST)
- Postal code: 470 02
- Website: www.bohatice.cz

Bohatice is a municipality and village in Česká Lípa District in the Liberec Region of the Czech Republic. It has about 300 inhabitants.

== History ==
The first written mention of Bohatice is from 1304.

== Demographics ==
Historical population
Year	Pop.	±%
1869	426	—
1880	376	−11.7%
1890	359	−4.5%
1900	334	−7.0%
1910	380	+13.8%
1921	329	−13.4%
1930	358	+8.8%
1950	195	−45.5%
1961	197	+1.0%
1970	193	−2.0%
1980	157	−18.7%
1991	146	−7.0%
2001	155	+6.2%
2011	189	+21.9%
2021	234	+23.8%
Source: Censuses
