= Ždírec (Česká Lípa District) =

- Municipality
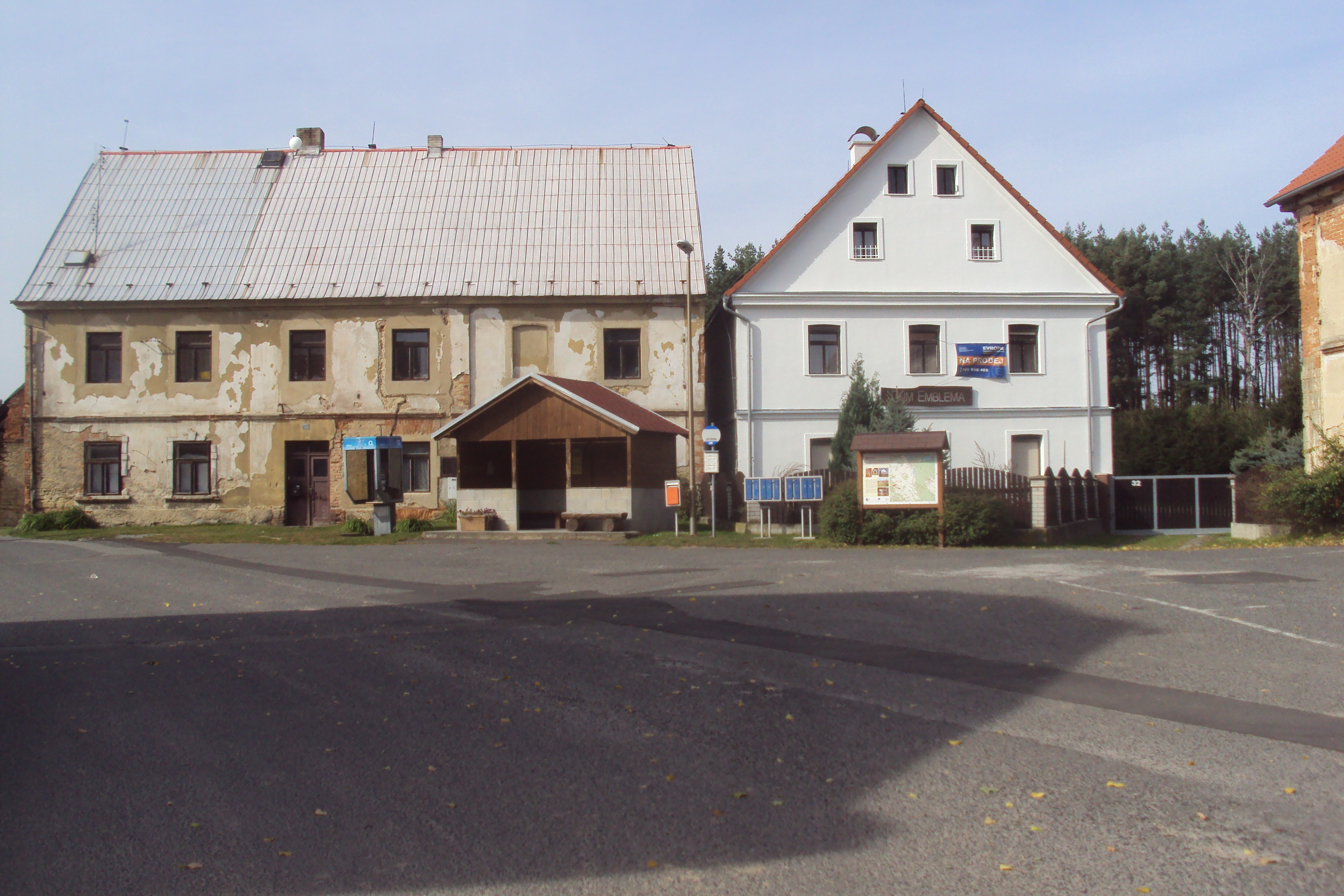
- Centre of Ždírec

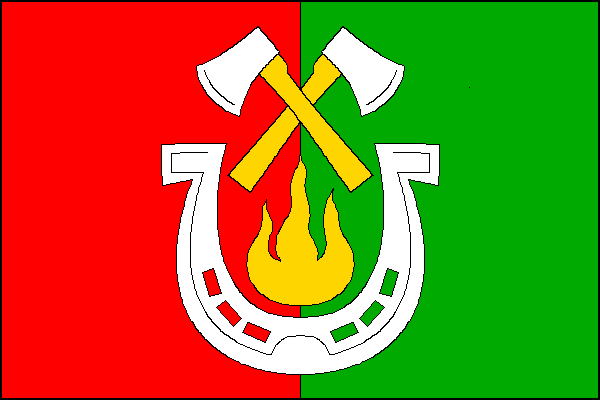
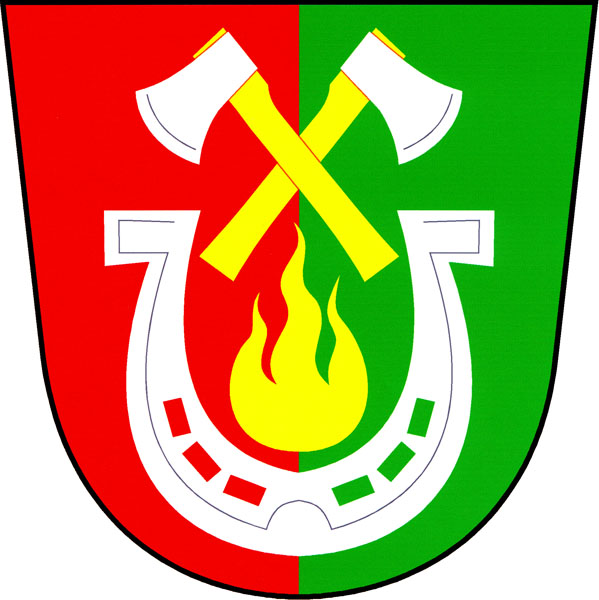
- Flag Coat of arms

- Location in the Czech Republic
- Coordinates: 50°30′56″N 14°37′28″E
- Country: Czech Republic
- Region: Liberec
- District: Česká Lípa
- First mentioned: 1352

Area
  - Total: 5.44 km^{2} (2.10 sq mi)
- Elevation: 370 m (1,210 ft)

Population (2026-01-01)
  - Total: 120
  - Density: 22/km^{2} (57/sq mi)
- Time zone: UTC+1 (CET)
  - Summer (DST): UTC+2 (CEST)
- Postal code: 472 01
- Website: zdireckokorinsko.cz

Ždírec (German: Siertsch) is a municipality and village in Česká Lípa District in the Liberec Region of the Czech Republic. It has about 100 inhabitants.

== Administrative division ==
Ždírec consists of three municipal parts (in brackets population according to the 2021 census):

- Ždírec (92)
- Bořejov (18)
- Ždírecký Důl (8)

== Demographics ==
Historical population
Year	Pop.	±%
1869	404	—
1880	367	−9.2%
1890	334	−9.0%
1900	327	−2.1%
1910	322	−1.5%
1921	298	−7.5%
1930	314	+5.4%
1950	193	−38.5%
1961	208	+7.8%
1970	163	−21.6%
1980	108	−33.7%
1991	93	−13.9%
2001	113	+21.5%
2011	107	−5.3%
2021	118	+10.3%
Source: Censuses
