= Chotovice (Česká Lípa District) =

- Municipality
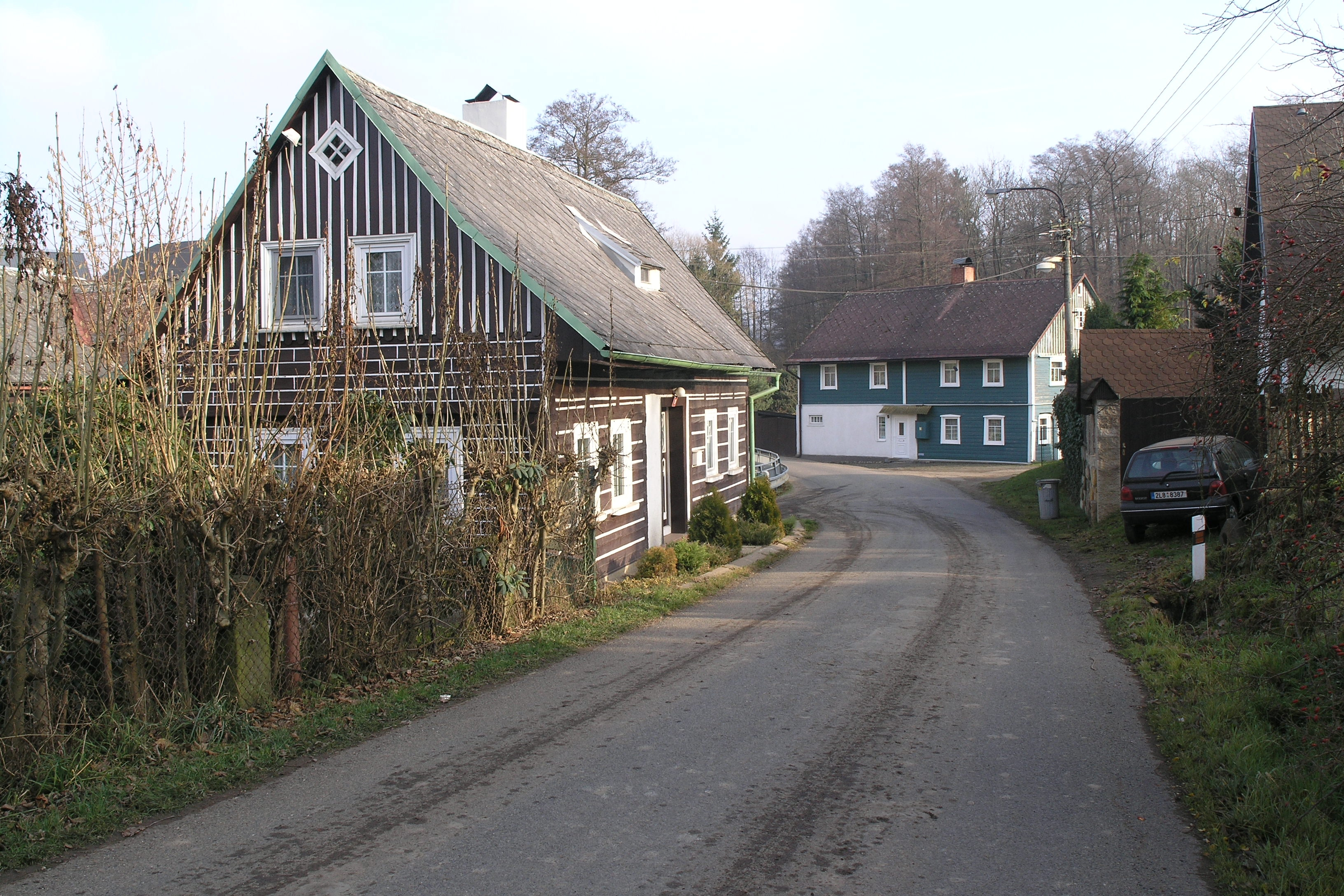
- A street in Chotovice

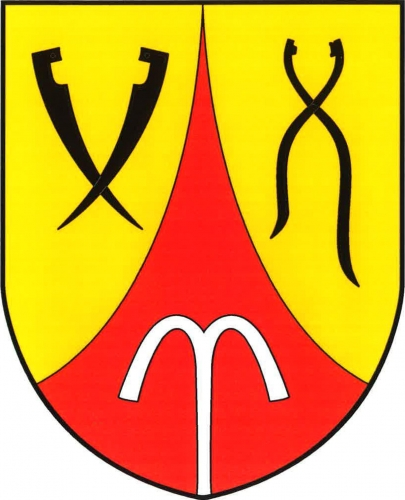
- Flag Coat of arms

- Location in the Czech Republic
- Coordinates: 50°44′25″N 14°33′34″E
- Country: Czech Republic
- Region: Liberec
- District: Česká Lípa
- First mentioned: 1455

Area
  - Total: 2.99 km^{2} (1.15 sq mi)
- Elevation: 304 m (997 ft)

Population (2026-01-01)
  - Total: 190
  - Density: 64/km^{2} (160/sq mi)
- Time zone: UTC+1 (CET)
  - Summer (DST): UTC+2 (CEST)
- Postal code: 473 01
- Website: www.obecchotovice.cz

Chotovice is a municipality and village in Česká Lípa District in the Liberec Region of the Czech Republic. It has about 200 inhabitants.

== Demographics ==
Historical population
Year	Pop.	±%
1869	283	—
1880	376	+32.9%
1890	358	−4.8%
1900	339	−5.3%
1910	344	+1.5%
1921	366	+6.4%
1930	386	+5.5%
1950	172	−55.4%
1961	160	−7.0%
1970	144	−10.0%
1980	110	−23.6%
1991	124	+12.7%
2001	130	+4.8%
2011	162	+24.6%
2021	175	+8.0%
Source: Censuses
