= Tuhaň (Česká Lípa District) =

- Municipality
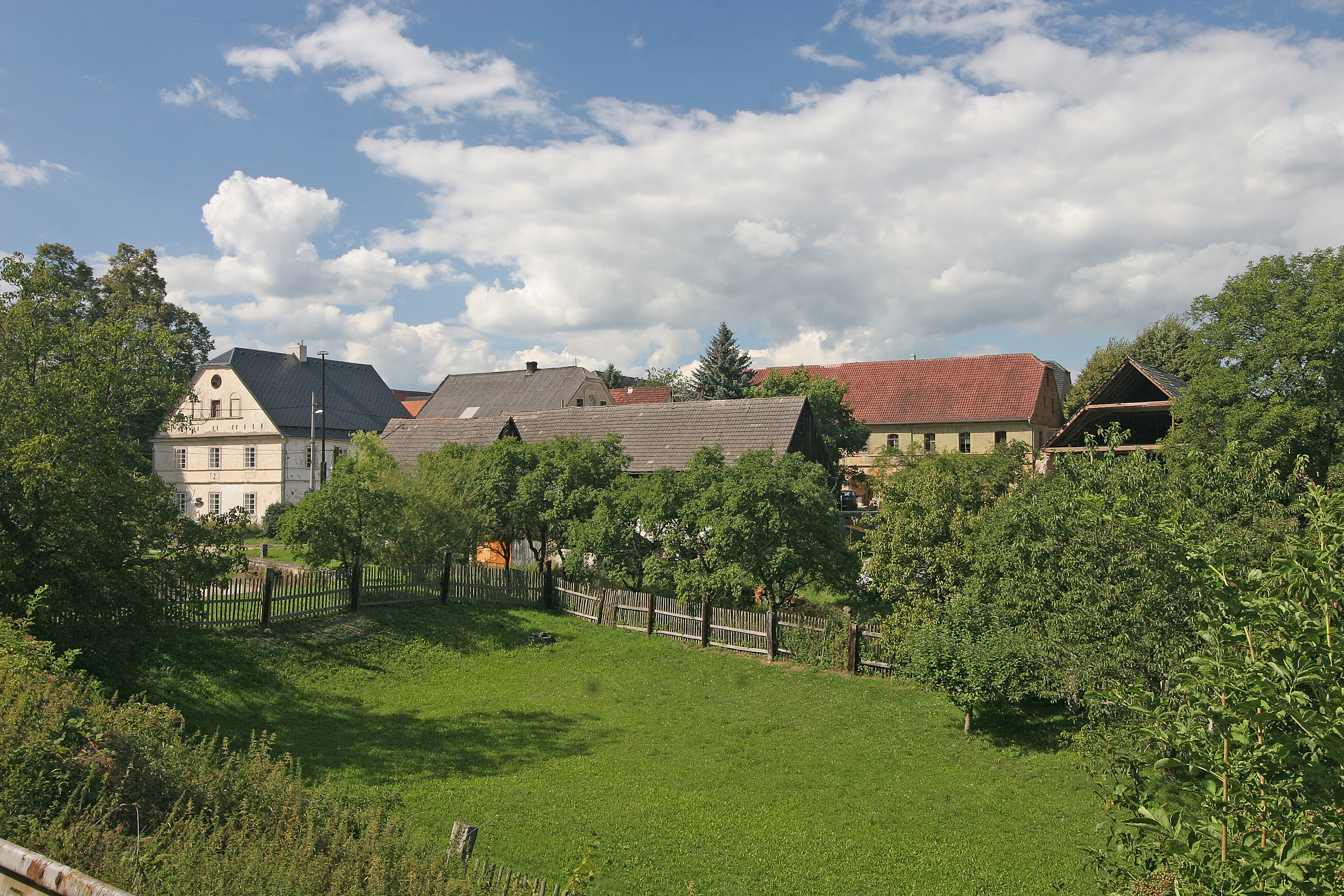
- Domašice, a part of Tuhaň

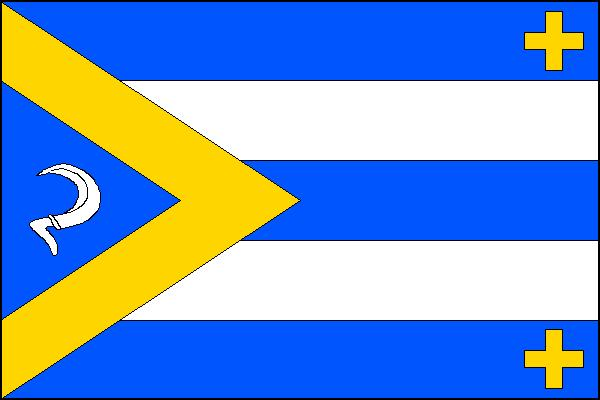
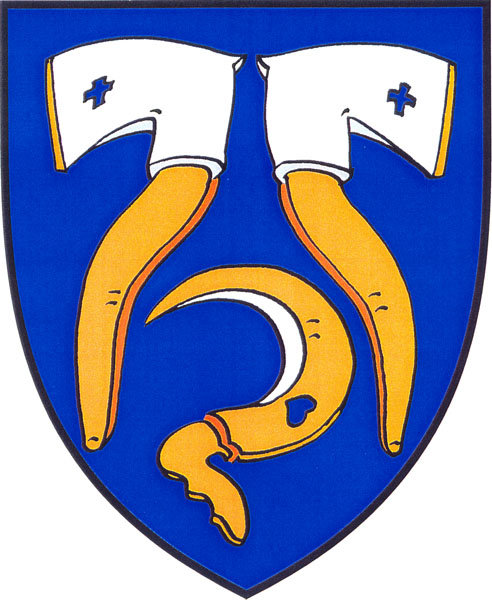
- Flag Coat of arms

- Location in the Czech Republic
- Coordinates: 50°32′12″N 14°28′3″E
- Country: Czech Republic
- Region: Liberec
- District: Česká Lípa
- First mentioned: 1352

Area
  - Total: 24.71 km^{2} (9.54 sq mi)
- Elevation: 273 m (896 ft)

Population (2026-01-01)
  - Total: 264
  - Density: 10.7/km^{2} (27.7/sq mi)
- Time zone: UTC+1 (CET)
  - Summer (DST): UTC+2 (CEST)
- Postal code: 472 01
- Website: www.obec-tuhan.cz

Tuhaň is a municipality and village in Česká Lípa District in the Liberec Region of the Czech Republic. It has about 300 inhabitants.

== Administrative division ==
Tuhaň consists of six municipal parts (in brackets population according to the 2021 census):

- Tuhaň (189)
- Dolní Dubová Hora (2)
- Domašice (28)
- Obrok (12)
- Pavličky (46)
- Tuhanec (10)

== Etymology ==
The name Tuhaň is derived from the personal name Tuhan, meaning "Tuhan's (court)".

== Geography ==
Tuhaň is located about 17 kilometres (11 mi) south of Česká Lípa and 48 km (30 mi) north of Prague. It lies in the Ralsko Uplands. The highest point is at 455 m (1,493 ft). Most of the territory lies in the Kokořínsko – Máchův kraj Protected Landscape Area.

== History ==
The first written mention of Tuhaň is from 1352.

== Demographics ==
Historical population

Year	Pop.	±%
1869	1,042	—
1880	1,071	+2.8%
1890	1,029	−3.9%
1900	968	−5.9%
1910	876	−9.5%

Year	Pop.	±%
1921	895	+2.2%
1930	919	+2.7%
1950	506	−44.9%
1961	420	−17.0%
1970	410	−2.4%

Year	Pop.	±%
1980	337	−17.8%
1991	290	−13.9%
2001	297	+2.4%
2011	273	−8.1%
2021	287	+5.1%

Source: Censuses

== Transport ==
There are no railways or major roads passing through the municipality.

== Sights ==
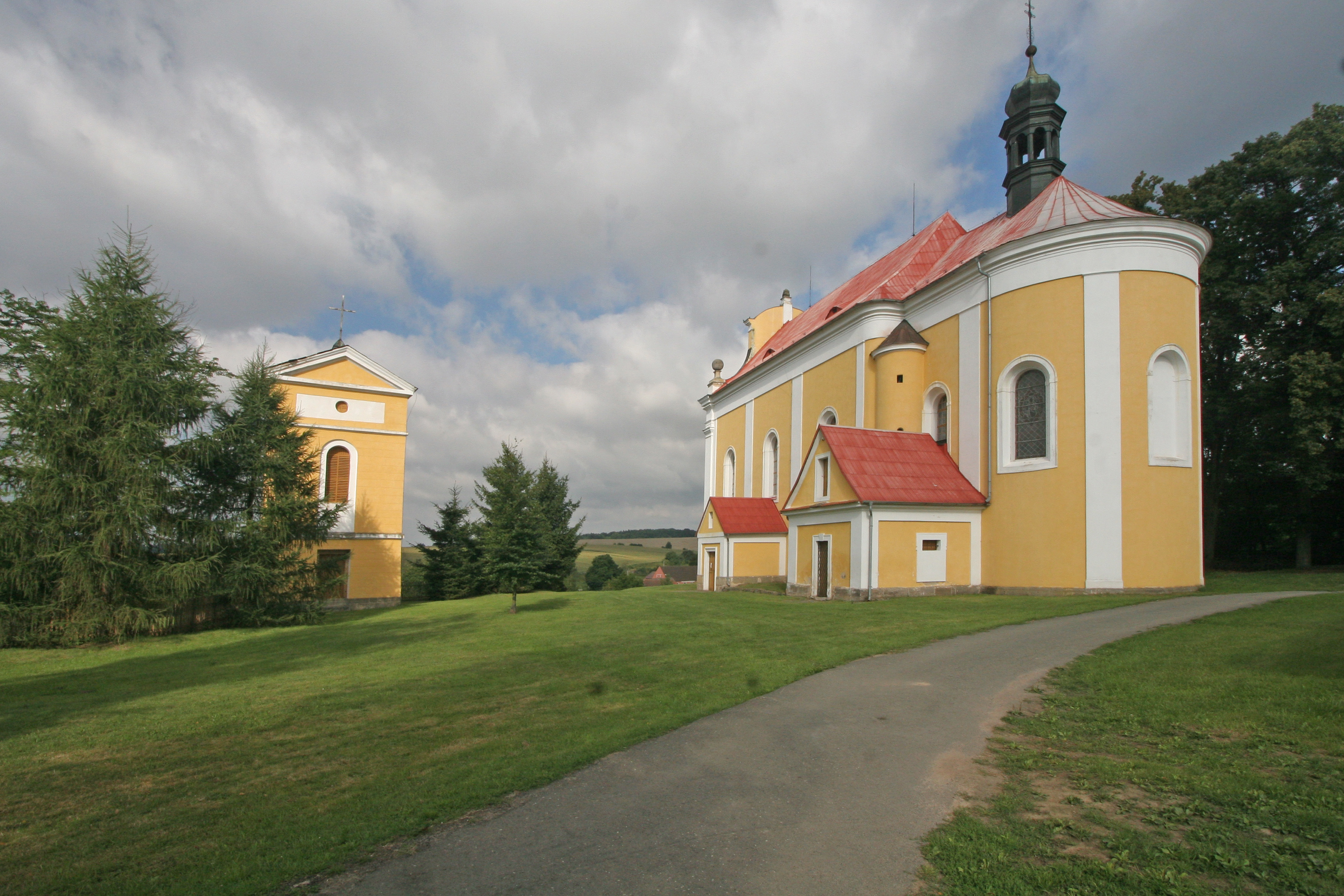
Church of Saint Gall

The main landmark of Tuhaň is the Church of Saint Gall. It was built in the Baroque style in 1708–1711. In 1839, the church was damaged by a fire and reconstructed.
