= Pertoltice pod Ralskem =

- Municipality
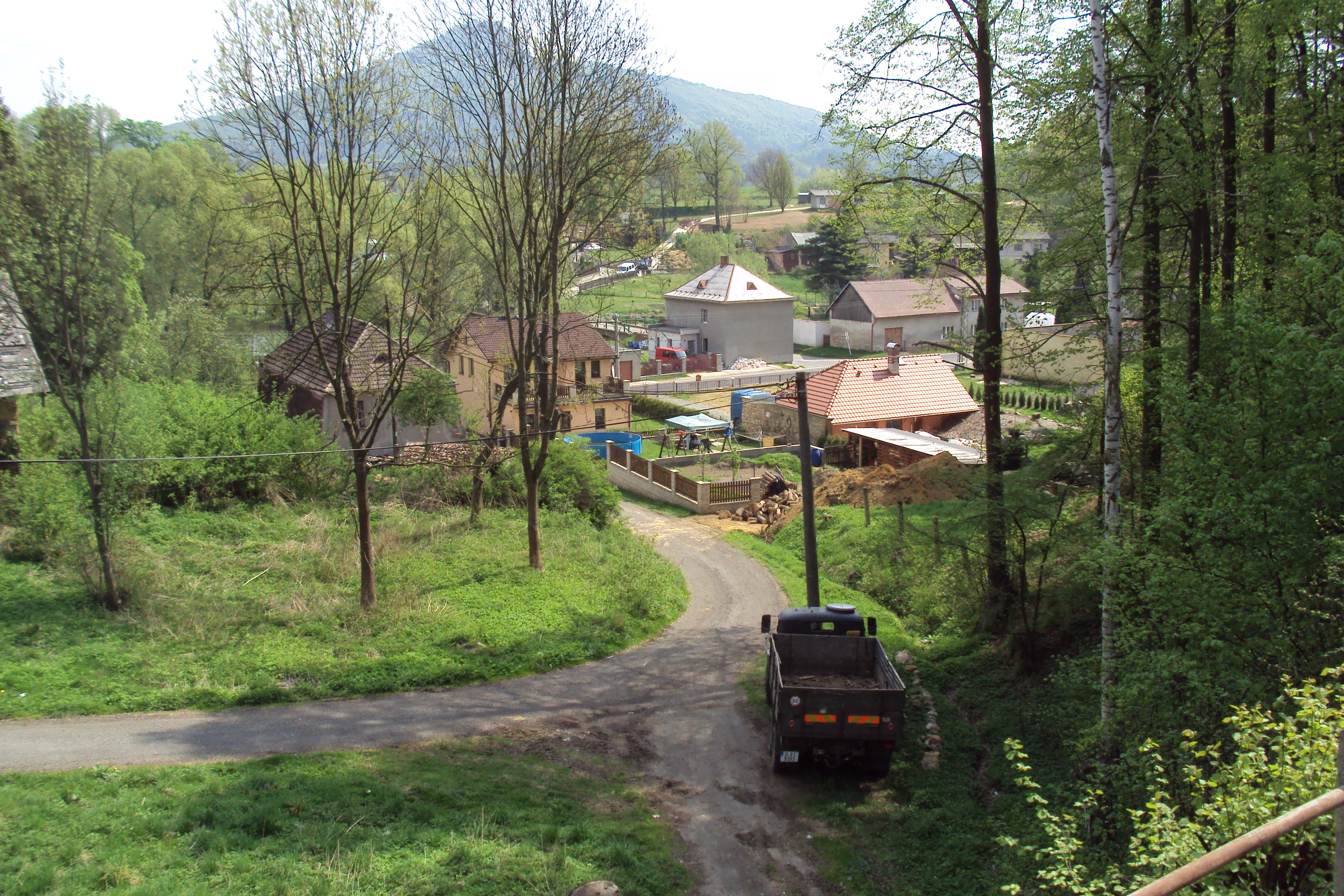
- View from the west

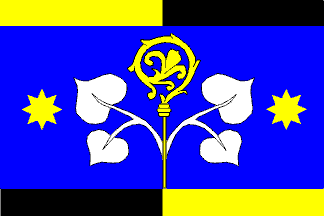
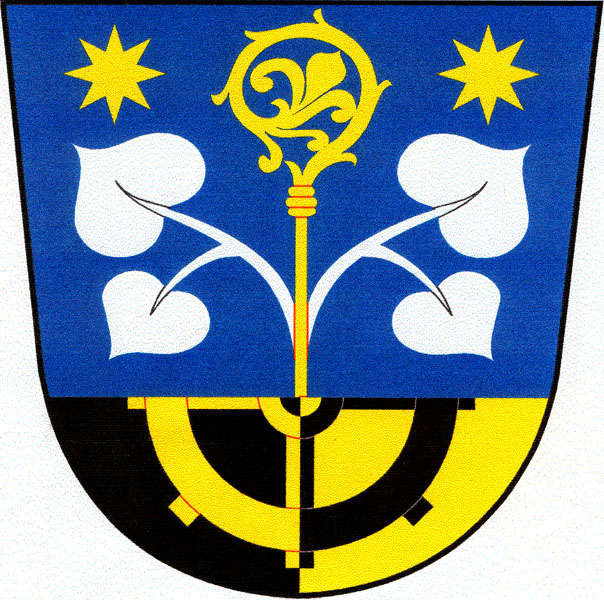
- Flag Coat of arms

- Location in the Czech Republic
- Coordinates: 50°40′48″N 14°43′9″E
- Country: Czech Republic
- Region: Liberec
- District: Česká Lípa
- First mentioned: 1359

Area
  - Total: 7.92 km^{2} (3.06 sq mi)
- Elevation: 284 m (932 ft)

Population (2026-01-01)
  - Total: 417
  - Density: 52.7/km^{2} (136/sq mi)
- Time zone: UTC+1 (CET)
  - Summer (DST): UTC+2 (CEST)
- Postal code: 471 24
- Website: pertoltice.cz

Pertoltice pod Ralskem (German: Barzdorf (am Rollberge)) is a municipality and village in Česká Lípa District in the Liberec Region of the Czech Republic. It has about 400 inhabitants.

== Demographics ==
Historical population
Year	Pop.	±%
1869	713	—
1880	715	+0.3%
1890	690	−3.5%
1900	737	+6.8%
1910	792	+7.5%
1921	782	−1.3%
1930	809	+3.5%
1950	472	−41.7%
1961	534	+13.1%
1970	503	−5.8%
1980	389	−22.7%
1991	262	−32.6%
2001	297	+13.4%
2011	368	+23.9%
2021	417	+13.3%
Source: Censuses
