= Krásný Les =

Krásný Les may refer to places in the Czech Republic:

- Krásný Les (Karlovy Vary District), a municipality and village in the Karlovy Vary Region
- Krásný Les (Liberec District), a municipality and village in the Liberec Region
- Krásný Les, a village and part of Petrovice (Ústí nad Labem District) in the Ústí nad Labem Region
