= Zdislava =

Zdislava may refer to:

- Zdislava (Liberec District), a market town in the Czech Republic
- Zdislava Berka (c. 1220–1252), Czech philanthropist and saint
- 5275 Zdislava, an asteroid
