= Mníšek =

- Municipality
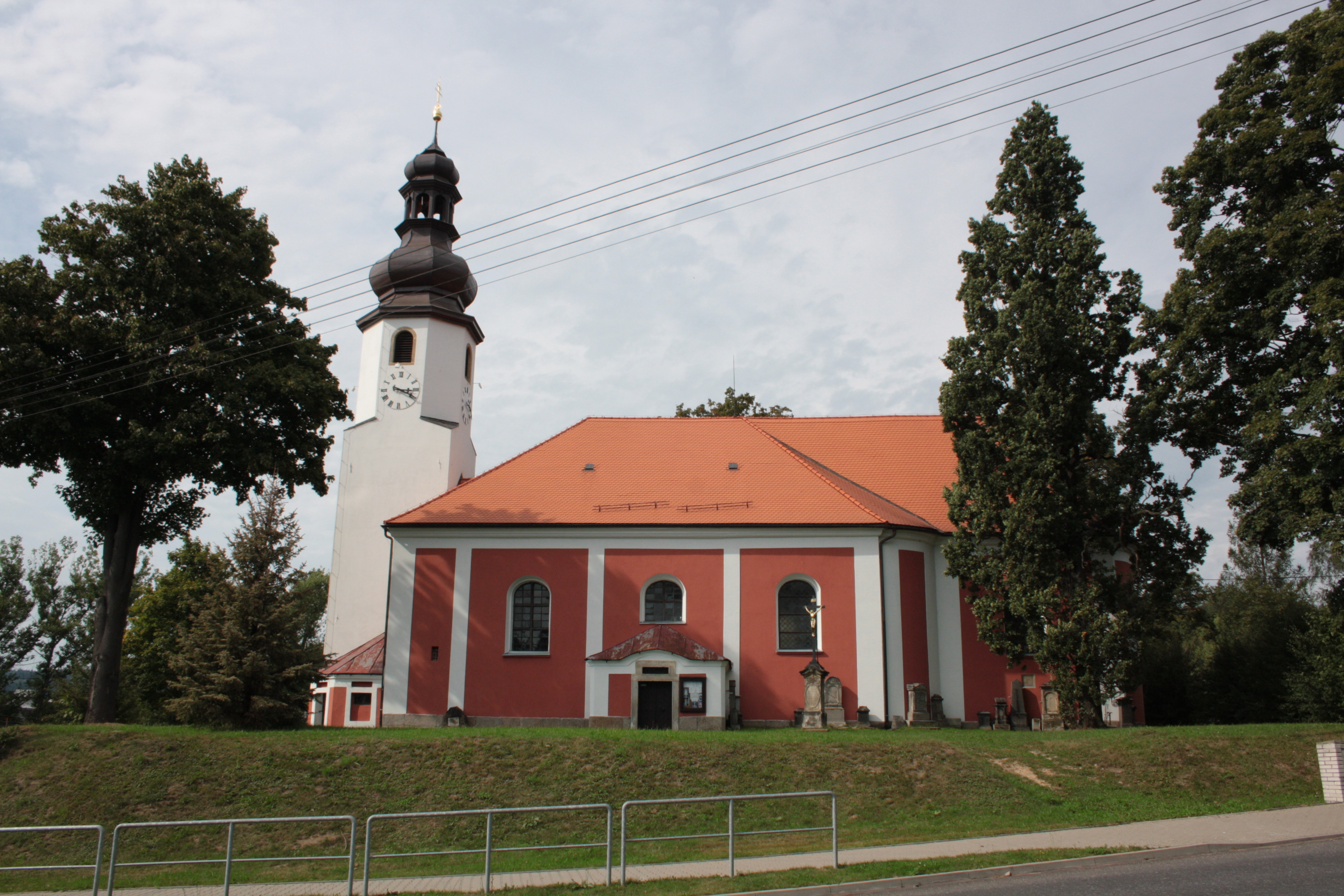
- Church of Saint Nicholas

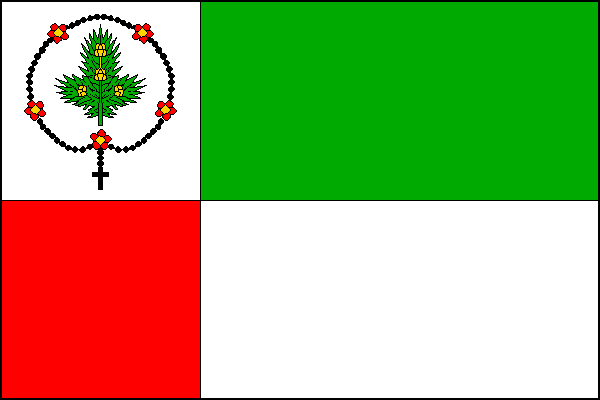
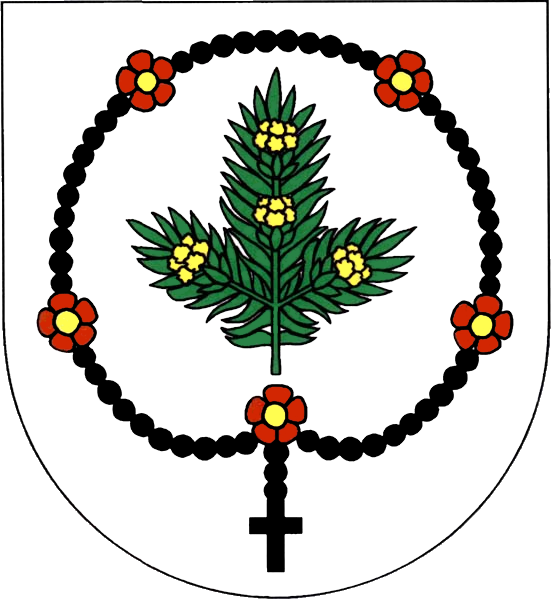
- Flag Coat of arms

- Location in the Czech Republic
- Coordinates: 50°49′54″N 15°3′23″E
- Country: Czech Republic
- Region: Liberec
- District: Liberec
- First mentioned: 1381

Area
  - Total: 25.44 km^{2} (9.82 sq mi)
- Elevation: 375 m (1,230 ft)

Population (2026-01-01)
  - Total: 1,830
  - Density: 71.9/km^{2} (186/sq mi)
- Time zone: UTC+1 (CET)
  - Summer (DST): UTC+2 (CEST)
- Postal code: 463 31
- Website: www.obec-mnisek.cz

Mníšek (German: Einsiedel in Isergebirge) is a municipality and village in Liberec District in the Liberec Region of the Czech Republic. It has about 1,800 inhabitants.

== Administrative division ==
Mníšek consists of two municipal parts (in brackets population according to the 2021 census):

- Mníšek (1,313)
- Fojtka (326)

== Etymology ==
The German name Einsiedel was derived from Einsiedler, i.e. 'hermit'. The Czech name was created as a free translation and is a diminutive of the word mnich, i.e. 'monk'.

== Geography ==
Mníšek is located about 6 kilometres (4 mi) north of Liberec. The western part of the municipal territory with the Mníšek village lies in the Zittau Basin, but most of the territory lies in the Jizera Mountains. The highest point is the mountain Olivetská hora at 886 m (2,907 ft) above sea level.

The built-up area is situated in the valley of the Jeřice River and the Fojtka Stream. Their confluence is in the centre of Mníšek. Fojtka Reservoir was built on the stream in 1904–1906. It is used for recreational purposes and as flood protection.

== History ==
The first written mention of Mníšek is from 1381. The village of Fojtka was first mentioned in 1559.

== Demographics ==
Historical population

Year	Pop.	±%
1869	2,385	—
1880	2,547	+6.8%
1890	2,468	−3.1%
1900	2,391	−3.1%
1910	2,436	+1.9%

Year	Pop.	±%
1921	2,030	−16.7%
1930	2,056	+1.3%
1950	1,210	−41.1%
1961	1,130	−6.6%
1970	1,085	−4.0%

Year	Pop.	±%
1980	952	−12.3%
1991	873	−8.3%
2001	1,063	+21.8%
2011	1,322	+24.4%
2021	1,639	+24.0%

Source: Censuses

== Transport ==
The I/13 road (the section from Liberec to the Czech–Polish border in Habartice) runs through the municipality.

Mníšek is located on two railway lines of local importance, heading from Liberec to Černousy and to Nové Město pod Smrkem.

== Sights ==
The main landmark of Mníšek is the Church of Saint Nicholas. The original wooden church was replaced by a stone one in 1570, then it was replaced by the current Baroque structure in 1739. The tower was raised in 1774. The rectory was built next to the church in 1767.
