= Bulovka =

- Municipality
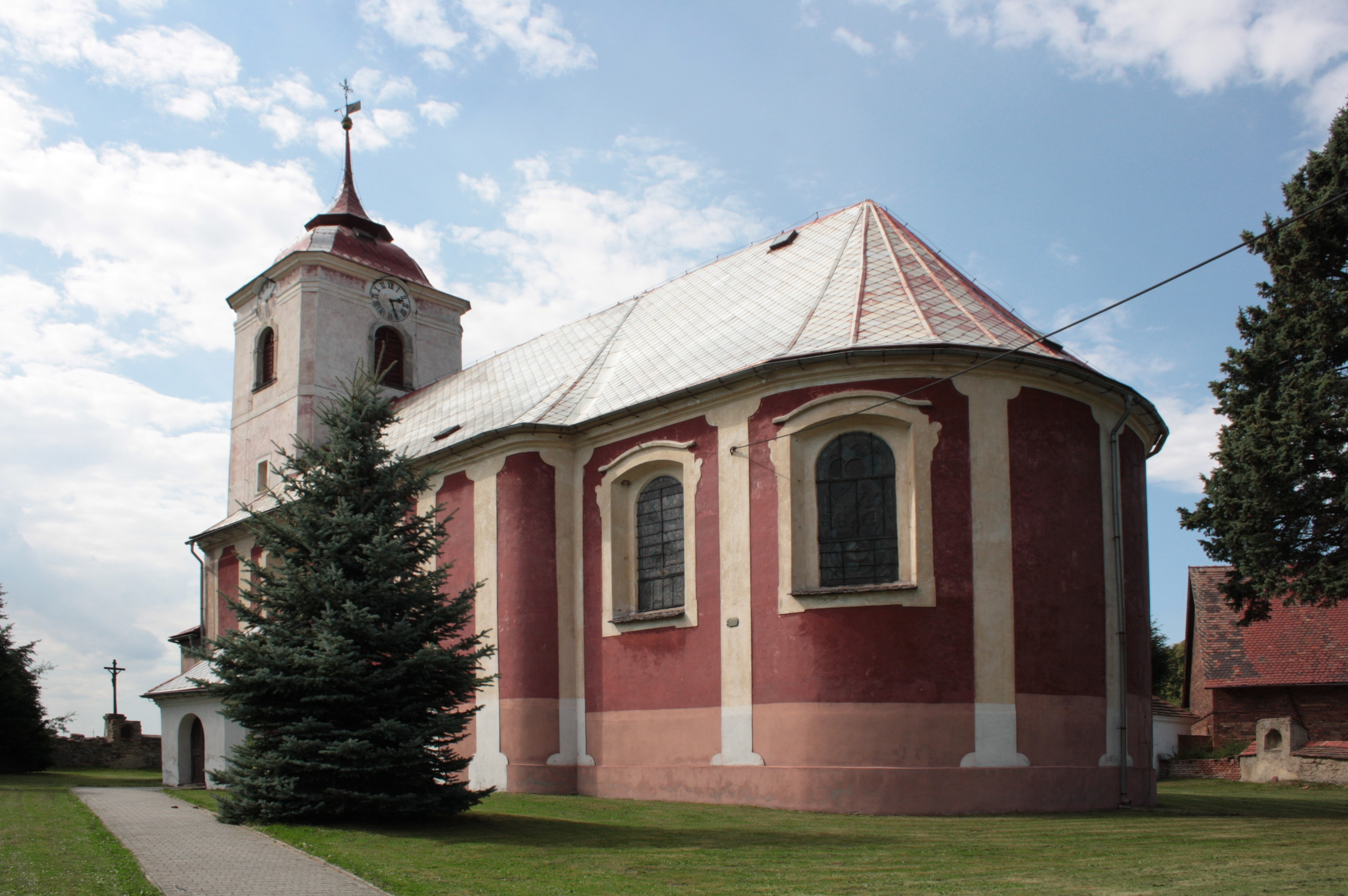
- Church of Saint Michael the Archangel

- Flag Coat of arms

- Location in the Czech Republic
- Coordinates: 50°58′16″N 15°7′25″E
- Country: Czech Republic
- Region: Liberec
- District: Liberec
- First mentioned: 1346

Area
  - Total: 28.88 km^{2} (11.15 sq mi)
- Elevation: 320 m (1,050 ft)

Population (2026-01-01)
  - Total: 894
  - Density: 31.0/km^{2} (80.2/sq mi)
- Time zone: UTC+1 (CET)
  - Summer (DST): UTC+2 (CEST)
- Postal code: 464 01
- Website: www.bulovka.eu

Bulovka (German: Bullendorf) is a municipality and village in Liberec District in the Liberec Region of the Czech Republic. It has about 900 inhabitants.

== Administrative division ==
Bulovka consists of three municipal parts (in brackets population according to the 2021 census):

- Bulovka (552)
- Arnoltice (329)
- Dolní Oldřiš (49)

== Etymology ==
The initial German name Bulendorf (later written as Bullendorf) was derived from the personal name Bule, meaning "Bule's village". The Czech name was created by transcription of the German name.

== Geography ==
Bulovka is located about 22 kilometres (14 mi) north of Liberec, in the salient microregion of Frýdlant Hook, on the border with Poland. It lies in the Jizera Foothills. The highest point is at 467 m (1,532 ft) above sea level. The stream Bulovský potok originates in the eastern part of the municipality and the flows across the municipality to the west.

== History ==
The first written mention of Bulovka is from 1346.

== Demographics ==
Historical population

| Year | Pop. | ±% |
|---|---|---|
| 1869 | 2,894 | — |
| 1880 | 2,775 | −4.1% |
| 1890 | 2,546 | −8.3% |
| 1900 | 2,400 | −5.7% |
| 1910 | 2,264 | −5.7% |

| Year | Pop. | ±% |
|---|---|---|
| 1921 | 2,009 | −11.3% |
| 1930 | 1,905 | −5.2% |
| 1950 | 859 | −54.9% |
| 1961 | 976 | +13.6% |
| 1970 | 952 | −2.5% |

| Year | Pop. | ±% |
|---|---|---|
| 1980 | 811 | −14.8% |
| 1991 | 703 | −13.3% |
| 2001 | 807 | +14.8% |
| 2011 | 842 | +4.3% |
| 2021 | 930 | +10.5% |

Source: Censuses

== Transport ==
The I/13 road from Liberec to the Czech–Polish border in Habartice runs through the village of Arnoltice.

== Sights ==
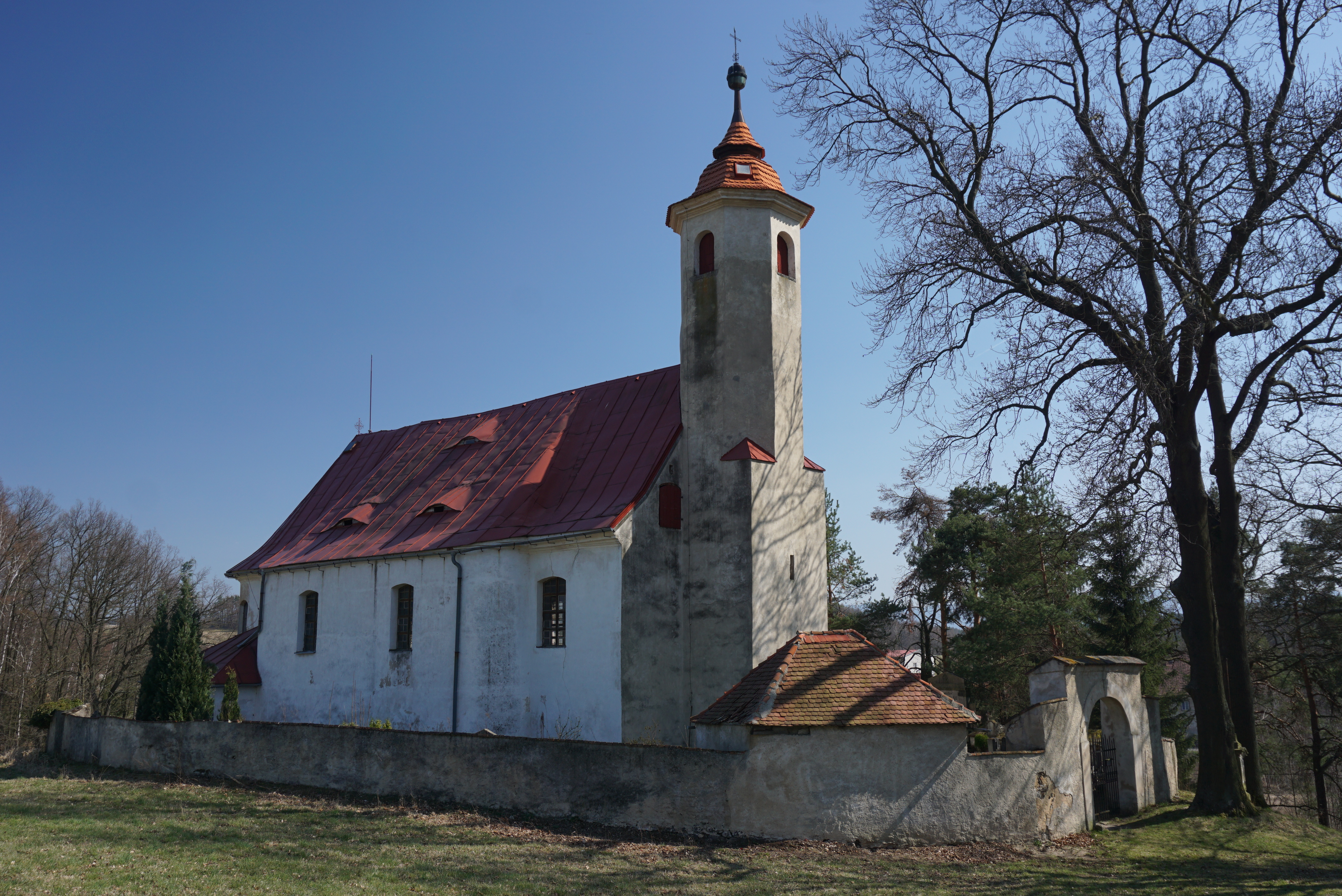
Church of Saint Mary Magdalene

The main landmarks are the three churches, one in each village of the municipality. The Church of Saint Michael the Archangel is located in Bulovka. It was built in the Baroque style in the first half of the 18th century.

The Church of Saint Mary Magdalene is located in Arnoltice. The first written document of the church is from 1404, but it was probably built in the last quarter of the 13th century. Originally a medieval church, it was rebuilt in the Baroque style in 1739.

The Church of Saint Martin is located in Dolní Oldřiš. It is a Gothic church with Baroque modifications. It was probably built in the 14th century.

A technical monument is the stone pedestrian bridge in Arnoltice. It was built before 1652, which makes it one of the oldest transport structures in the region.
