= Svijanský Újezd =

- Municipality
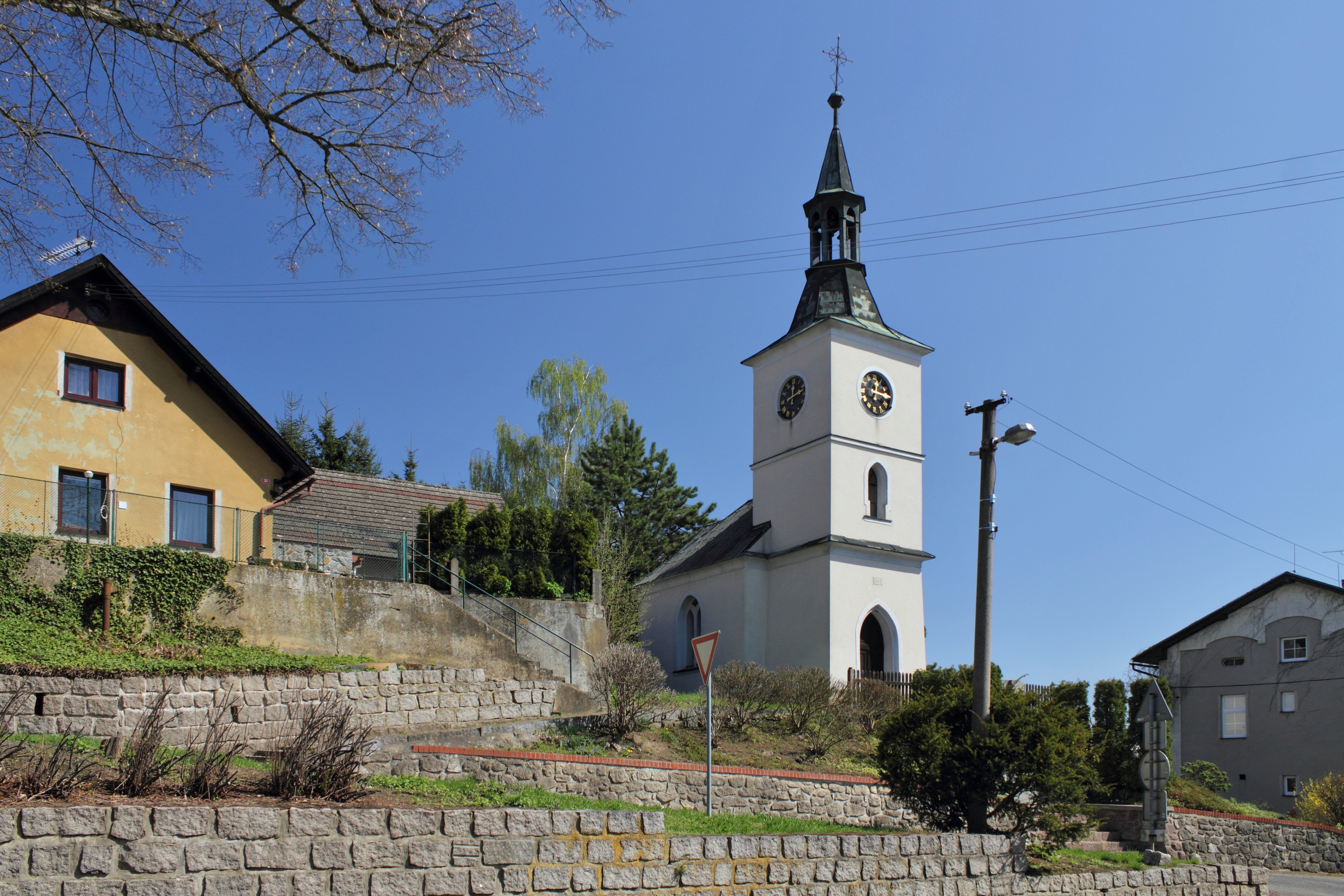
- Church of Saint Cyril and Methodius

- Flag Coat of arms

- Location in the Czech Republic
- Coordinates: 50°35′14″N 15°2′36″E
- Country: Czech Republic
- Region: Liberec
- District: Liberec
- First mentioned: 1436

Area
  - Total: 5.31 km^{2} (2.05 sq mi)
- Elevation: 258 m (846 ft)

Population (2026-01-01)
  - Total: 447
  - Density: 84.2/km^{2} (218/sq mi)
- Time zone: UTC+1 (CET)
  - Summer (DST): UTC+2 (CEST)
- Postal code: 463 45
- Website: www.svijanskyujezd.cz

Svijanský Újezd is a municipality and village in Liberec District in the Liberec Region of the Czech Republic. It has about 400 inhabitants.

== Administrative division ==
Svijanský Újezd consists of three municipal parts (in brackets population according to the 2021 census):

- Svijanský Újezd (401)
- Močítka (34)
- Jirsko 2.díl (1)

== History ==
The first written mention of Svijanský Újezd is from 1436.

== Demographics ==
Historical population
| Year | Pop. | ±% |
|---|---|---|
| 1869 | 436 | — |
| 1880 | 461 | +5.7% |
| 1890 | 502 | +8.9% |
| 1900 | 518 | +3.2% |
| 1910 | 534 | +3.1% |
| 1921 | 538 | +0.7% |
| 1930 | 523 | −2.8% |
| 1950 | 372 | −28.9% |
| 1961 | 351 | −5.6% |
| 1970 | 346 | −1.4% |
| 1980 | 311 | −10.1% |
| 1991 | 353 | +13.5% |
| 2001 | 358 | +1.4% |
| 2011 | 433 | +20.9% |
| 2021 | 436 | +0.7% |
Source: Censuses
