= Vlastibořice =

- Municipality
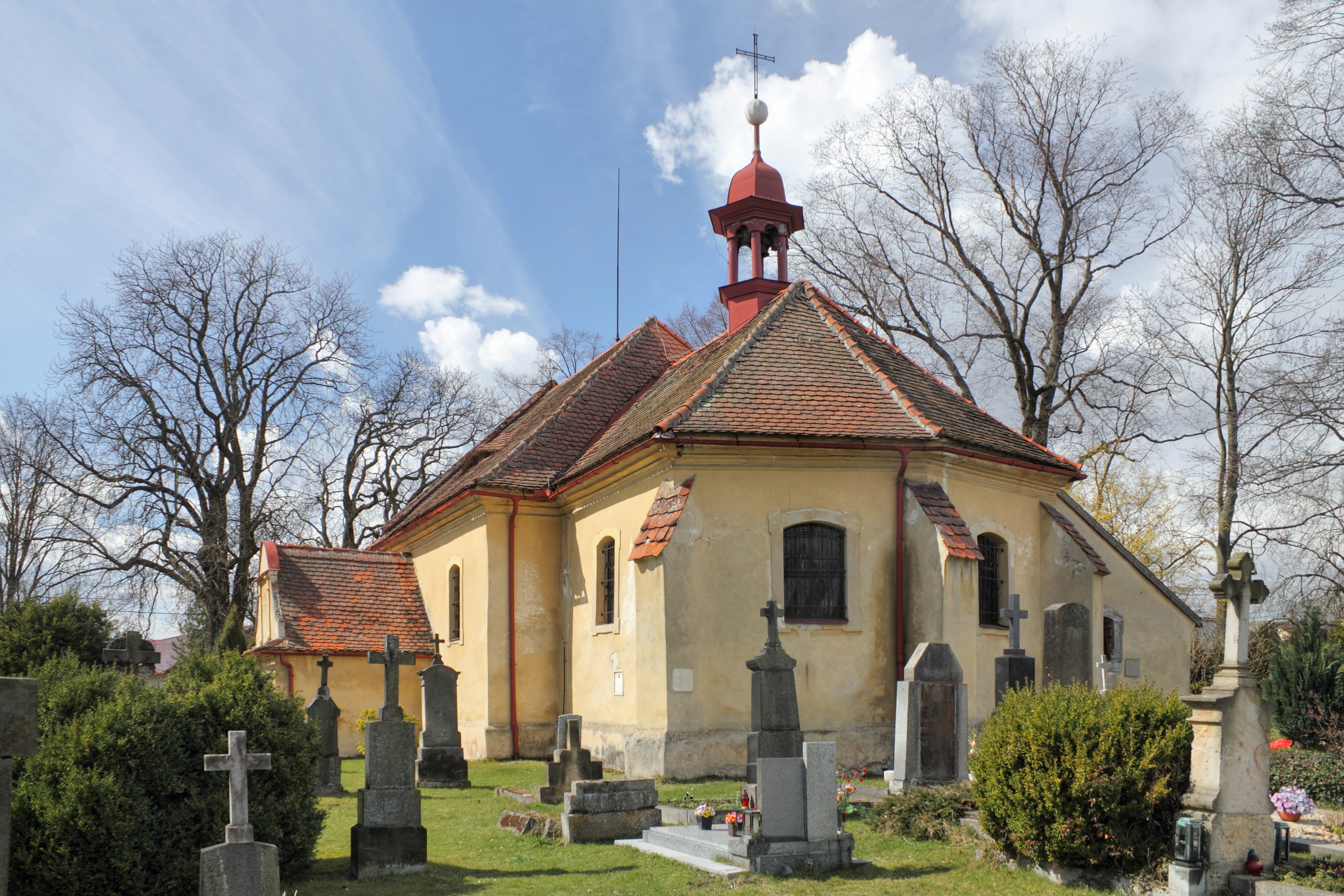
- Church of Saint Catherine of Alexandria

- Flag Coat of arms

- Location in the Czech Republic
- Coordinates: 50°37′8″N 15°3′8″E
- Country: Czech Republic
- Region: Liberec
- District: Liberec
- First mentioned: 1357

Area
  - Total: 5.51 km^{2} (2.13 sq mi)
- Elevation: 382 m (1,253 ft)

Population (2026-01-01)
  - Total: 350
  - Density: 64/km^{2} (160/sq mi)
- Time zone: UTC+1 (CET)
  - Summer (DST): UTC+2 (CEST)
- Postal code: 463 44
- Website: vlastiborice.cz

Vlastibořice (German: Wlastiborschitz) is a municipality and village in Liberec District in the Liberec Region of the Czech Republic. It has about 400 inhabitants.

== Administrative division ==
Vlastibořice consists of four municipal parts (in brackets population according to the 2021 census):

- Vlastibořice (189)
- Jivina (111)
- Sedlíšťka (46)
- Slavíkov (8)

== History ==
The first written mention of Vlastibořice is from 1357.

== Demographics ==
Historical population
Year	Pop.	±%
1869	556	—
1880	552	−0.7%
1890	600	+8.7%
1900	550	−8.3%
1910	524	−4.7%
1921	510	−2.7%
1930	509	−0.2%
1950	355	−30.3%
1961	304	−14.4%
1970	278	−8.6%
1980	277	−0.4%
1991	197	−28.9%
2001	211	+7.1%
2011	251	+19.0%
2021	354	+41.0%
Source: Censuses
