= Proseč pod Ještědem =

- Municipality
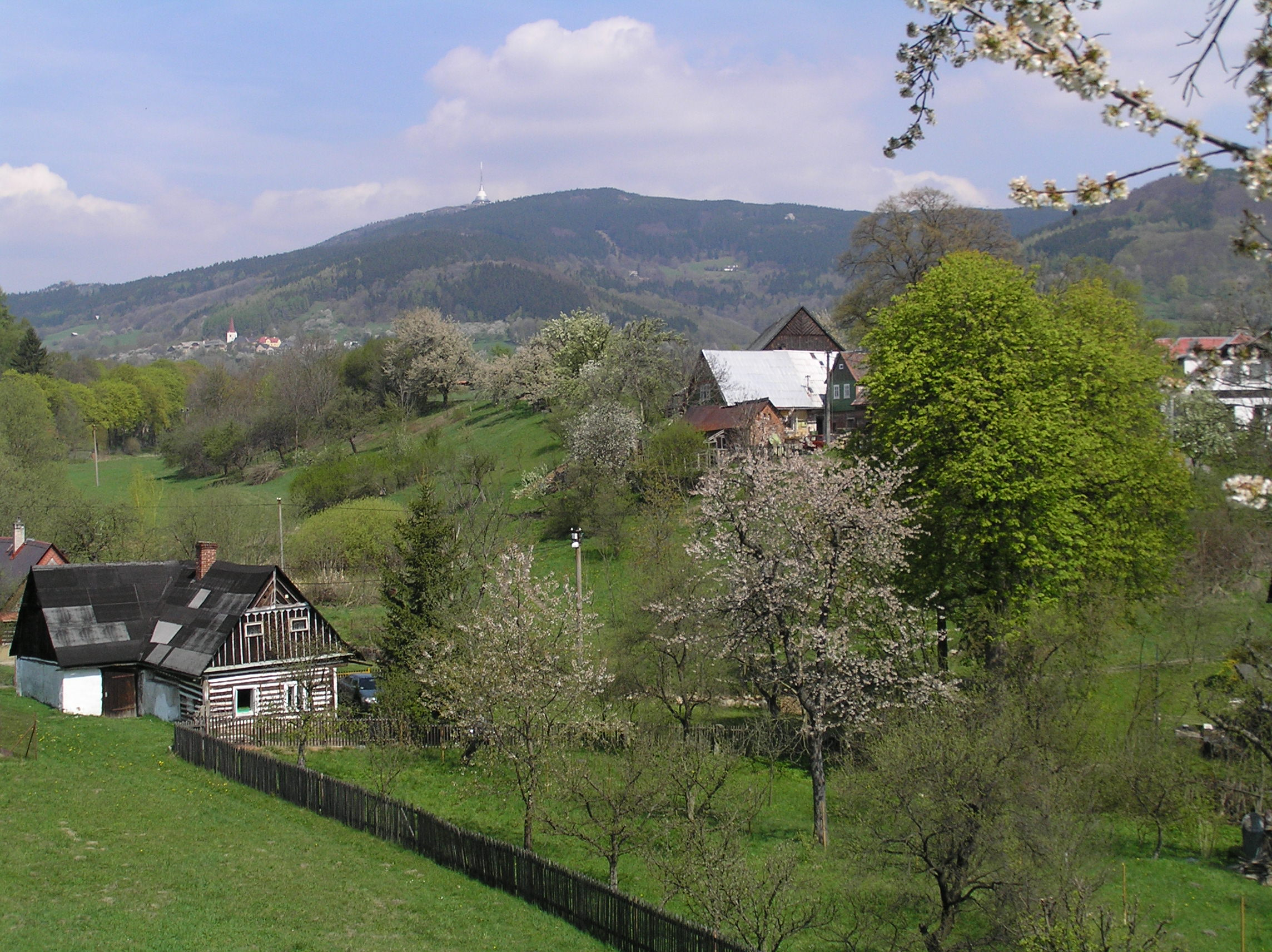
- Javorník, a part of Proseč pod Ještědem

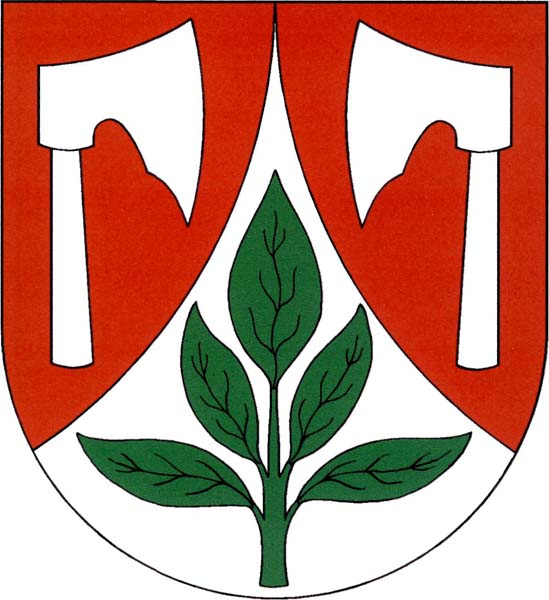
- Flag Coat of arms

- Location in the Czech Republic
- Coordinates: 50°42′6″N 15°1′2″E
- Country: Czech Republic
- Region: Liberec
- District: Liberec
- First mentioned: 1547

Area
  - Total: 8.38 km^{2} (3.24 sq mi)
- Elevation: 410 m (1,350 ft)

Population (2026-01-01)
  - Total: 452
  - Density: 53.9/km^{2} (140/sq mi)
- Time zone: UTC+1 (CET)
  - Summer (DST): UTC+2 (CEST)
- Postal code: 463 43
- Website: www.ppj.cz

Proseč pod Ještědem is a municipality and village in Liberec District in the Liberec Region of the Czech Republic. It has about 500 inhabitants.

== Administrative division ==
Proseč pod Ještědem consists of five municipal parts (in brackets population according to the 2021 census):

- Proseč pod Ještědem (244)
- Domaslavice (74)
- Horka (25)
- Javorník (73)
- Padouchov (2)

== Demographics ==
Historical population
Year	Pop.	±%
1869	1,168	—
1880	1,147	−1.8%
1890	1,200	+4.6%
1900	1,037	−13.6%
1910	993	−4.2%
1921	873	−12.1%
1930	900	+3.1%
1950	553	−38.6%
1961	469	−15.2%
1970	388	−17.3%
1980	314	−19.1%
1991	259	−17.5%
2001	269	+3.9%
2011	338	+25.7%
2021	418	+23.7%
Source: Censuses
