= Čtveřín =

- Municipality
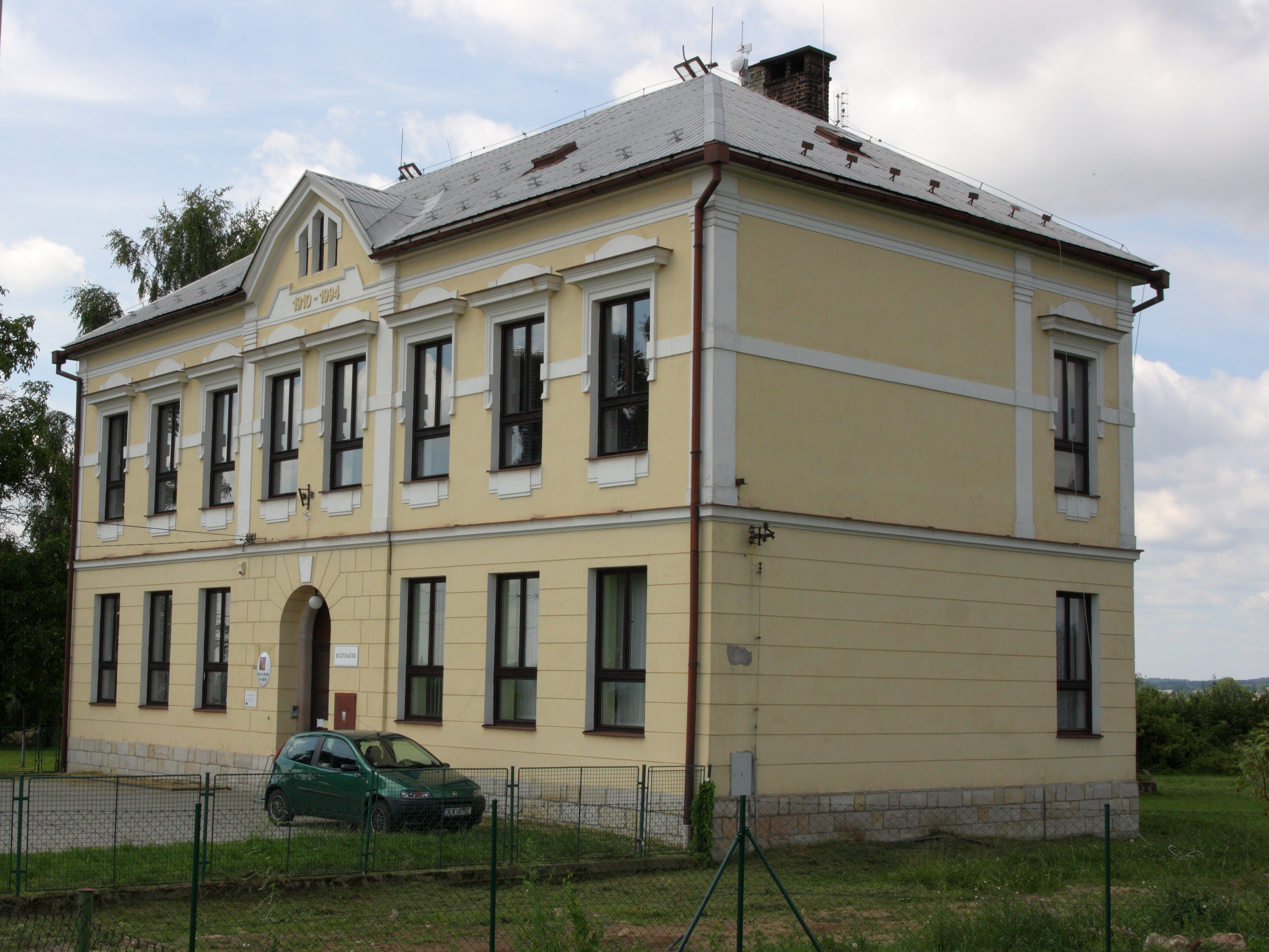
- Municipal office

- Flag Coat of arms

- Location in the Czech Republic
- Coordinates: 50°35′33″N 15°6′0″E
- Country: Czech Republic
- Region: Liberec
- District: Liberec
- First mentioned: 1394

Area
  - Total: 4.95 km^{2} (1.91 sq mi)
- Elevation: 274 m (899 ft)

Population (2026-01-01)
  - Total: 601
  - Density: 121/km^{2} (314/sq mi)
- Time zone: UTC+1 (CET)
  - Summer (DST): UTC+2 (CEST)
- Postal code: 463 45
- Website: ctverin-doubi.cz

Čtveřín (German: Stwerschin) is a municipality and village in Liberec District in the Liberec Region of the Czech Republic. It has about 600 inhabitants.

== Administrative division ==
Čtveřín consists of two municipal parts (in brackets population according to the 2021 census):

- Čtveřín (256)
- Doubí (307)

== Etymology ==
The name is derived from the personal name Čtvera, meaning "Čtvera's (court)".

== Geography ==
Čtveřín is located about 17 kilometres (11 mi) south of Liberec. It lies in the Jičín Uplands. The highest point is at 380 m (1,250 ft) above sea level. The stream Čtveřínský potok flows through the municipality.

== History ==
The first written mention of Čtveřín is from 1394. Doubí was first mentioned in 1388. From 1456, it was part of the Malá Skála estate.

After the abolition of manorialism in 1850, Čtveřín with the nearby villages of Doubí, Husa (today a part of Paceřice) and Sychrov became a sovereign municipality. In 1961, Sychrov became a municipality and Čtveřín was amalgamated into it. Since 1990, Čtveřín has been a separate municipality again.

== Demographics ==
Historical population

Year	Pop.	±%
1869	455	—
1880	505	+11.0%
1890	538	+6.5%
1900	606	+12.6%
1910	594	−2.0%

Year	Pop.	±%
1921	617	+3.9%
1930	613	−0.6%
1950	441	−28.1%
1961	448	+1.6%
1970	398	−11.2%

Year	Pop.	±%
1980	413	+3.8%
1991	406	−1.7%
2001	406	+0.0%
2011	491	+20.9%
2021	563	+14.7%

Source: Censuses

== Transport ==
The D10 motorway runs through the southern part of the municipality.

Čtveřín is located on the Liberec–Stará Paka railway line and is served by the Doubí u Turnova station in Doubí.

== Sights ==
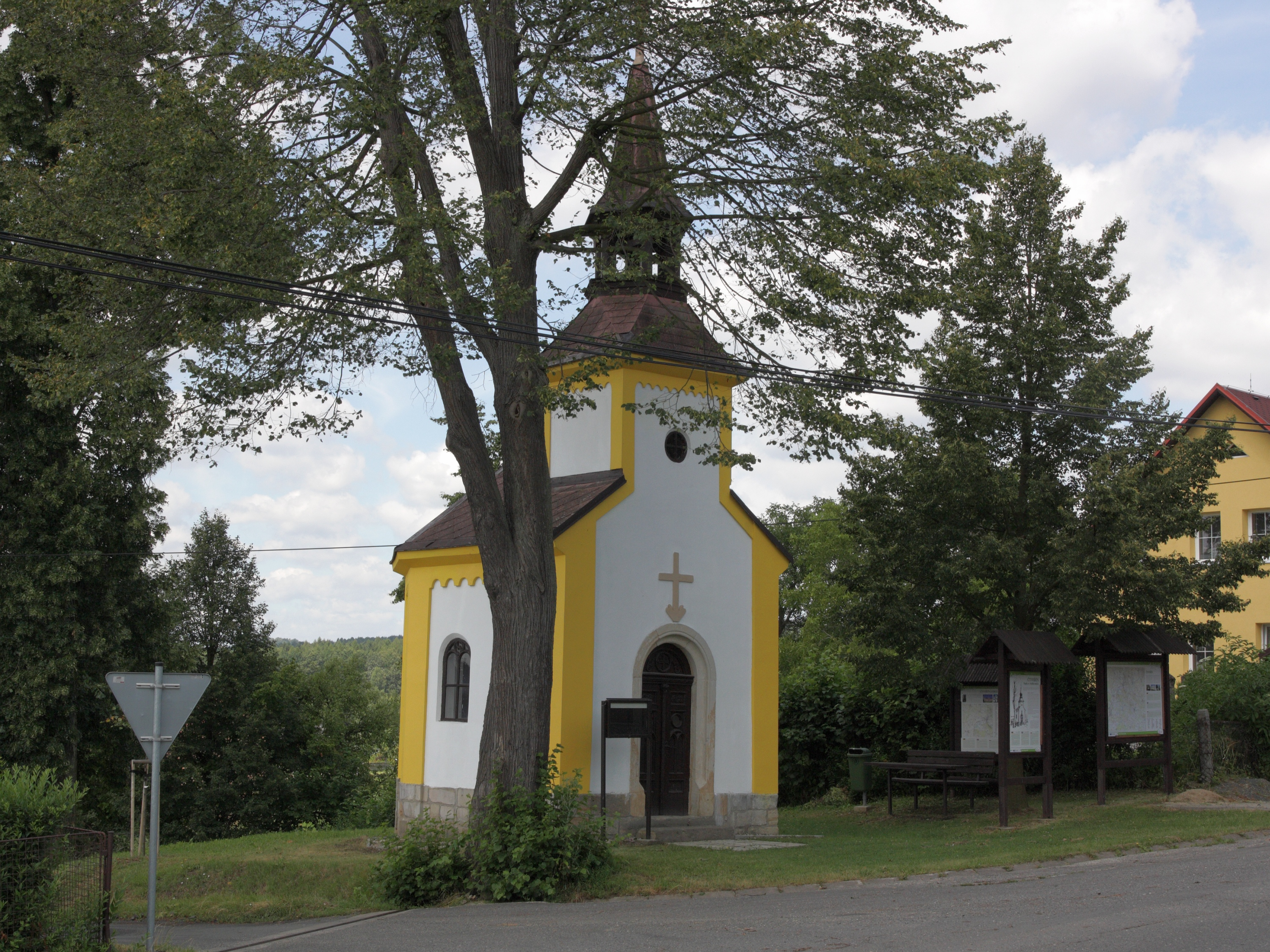
Chapel of the Guardian Angel in Doubí

The most notable historic monuments are the sculpture of Calvary in Čtveřín and the Chapel of the Guardian Angel in Doubí. A landmark is the former primary school, today used as the municipal office.
