= Cetenov =

- Municipality
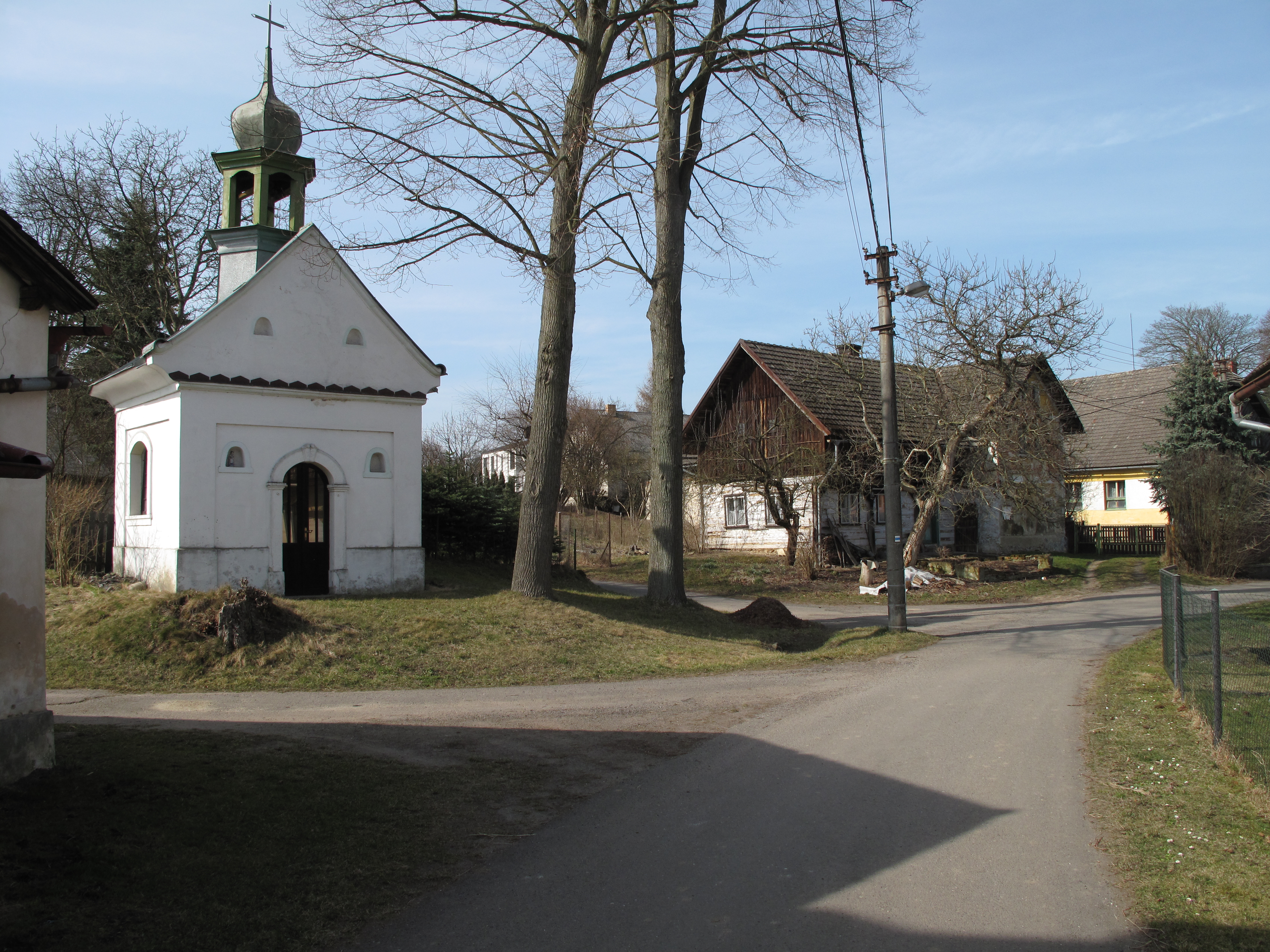
- Chapel of Saint Leonard in Hrubý Lesnov

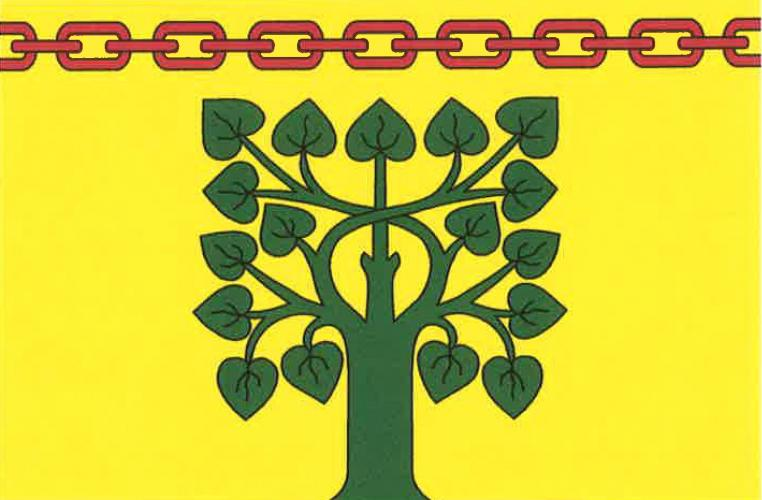
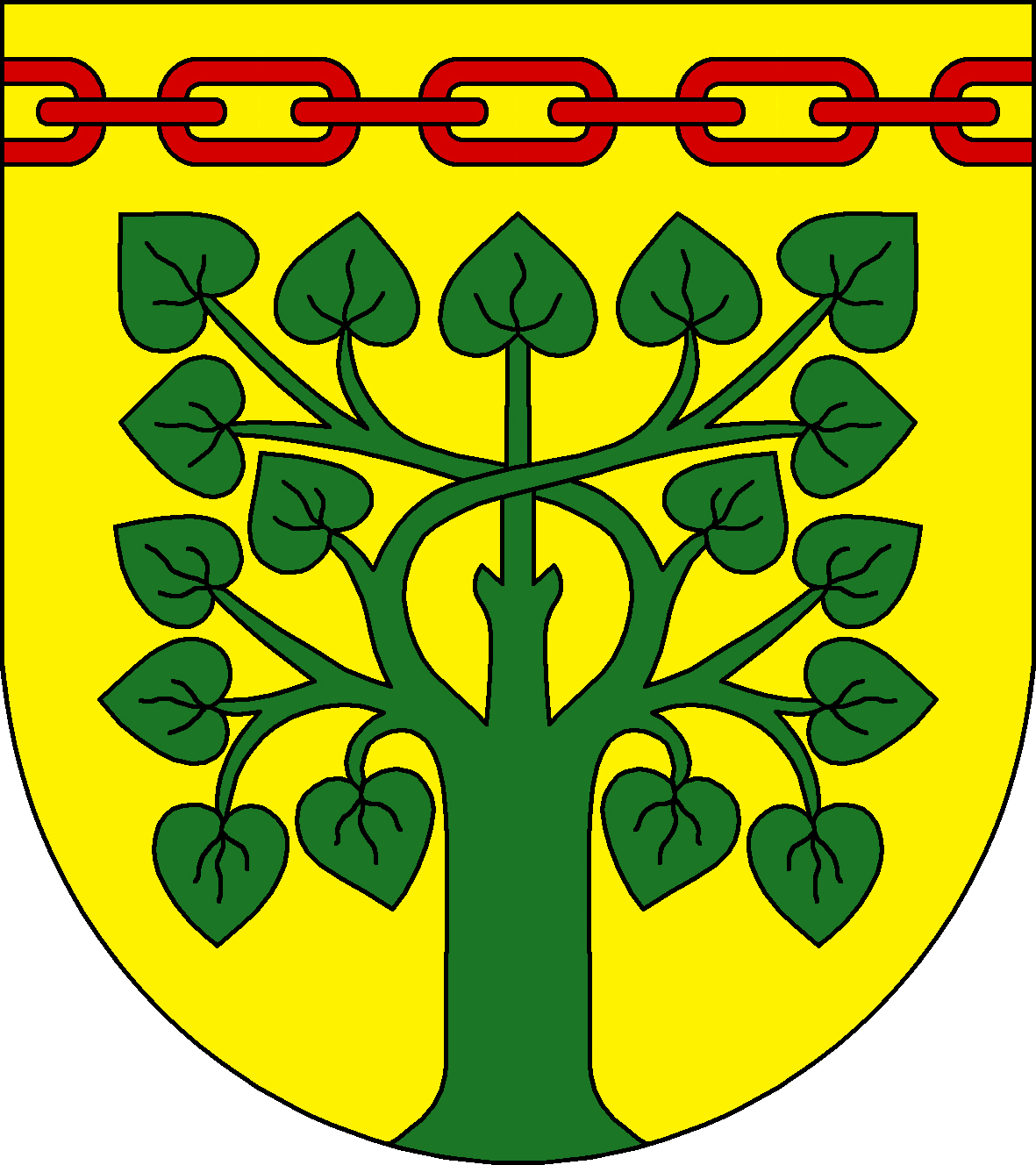
- Flag Coat of arms

- Location in the Czech Republic
- Coordinates: 50°38′40″N 14°55′4″E
- Country: Czech Republic
- Region: Liberec
- District: Liberec
- First mentioned: 1536

Area
  - Total: 6.05 km^{2} (2.34 sq mi)
- Elevation: 380 m (1,250 ft)

Population (2026-01-01)
  - Total: 118
  - Density: 19.5/km^{2} (50.5/sq mi)
- Time zone: UTC+1 (CET)
  - Summer (DST): UTC+2 (CEST)
- Postal code: 463 48
- Website: www.cetenov.cz

Cetenov (German: Zetten) is a municipality and village in Liberec District in the Liberec Region of the Czech Republic. It has about 100 inhabitants.

== Administrative division ==
Cetenov consists of six municipal parts (in brackets population according to the 2021 census):

- Cetenov (7)
- Dehtáry (12)
- Dolánky (2)
- Hrubý Lesnov (64)
- Těšnov (16)
- Vystrkov (20)

== History ==
The first written mention of Cetenov is from 1536.

== Demographics ==
Historical population
Year	Pop.	±%
1869	559	—
1880	501	−10.4%
1890	501	+0.0%
1900	505	+0.8%
1910	445	−11.9%
1921	432	−2.9%
1930	451	+4.4%
1950	239	−47.0%
1961	231	−3.3%
1970	185	−19.9%
1980	169	−8.6%
1991	126	−25.4%
2001	111	−11.9%
2011	118	+6.3%
2021	121	+2.5%
Source: Censuses
