= Soběslavice =

- Municipality
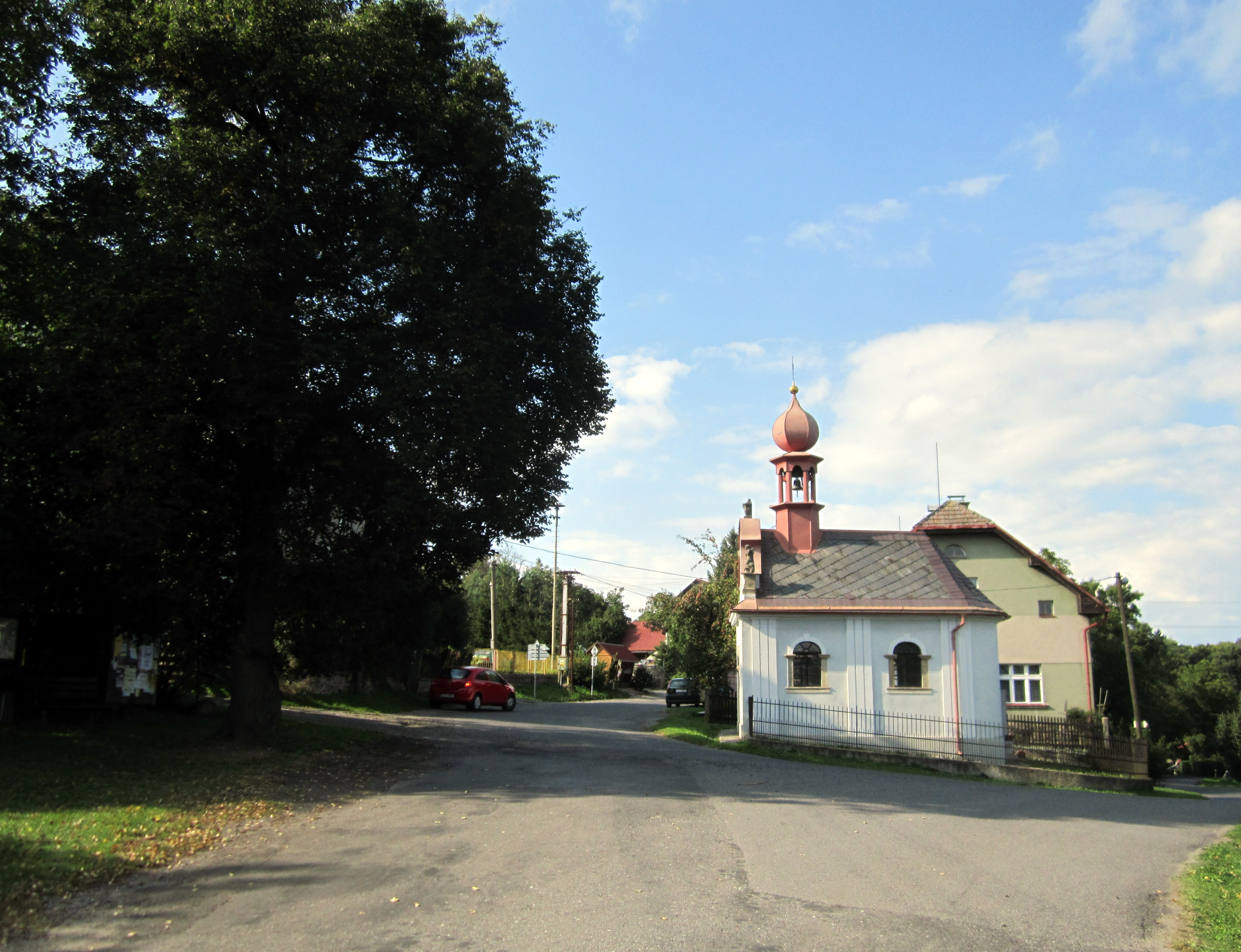
- Chapel of Saint John of Nepomuk

- Flag Coat of arms

- Location in the Czech Republic
- Coordinates: 50°36′18″N 15°2′3″E
- Country: Czech Republic
- Region: Liberec
- District: Liberec
- First mentioned: 1371

Area
  - Total: 4.05 km^{2} (1.56 sq mi)
- Elevation: 320 m (1,050 ft)

Population (2026-01-01)
  - Total: 175
  - Density: 43.2/km^{2} (112/sq mi)
- Time zone: UTC+1 (CET)
  - Summer (DST): UTC+2 (CEST)
- Postal code: 463 45
- Website: www.sobeslavice.cz

Soběslavice (German: Sebeslawitz) is a municipality and village in Liberec District in the Liberec Region of the Czech Republic. It has about 200 inhabitants.

== Administrative division ==
Soběslavice consists of two municipal parts (in brackets population according to the 2021 census):

- Soběslavice (124)
- Padařovice (35)

== Etymology ==
The name is derived from the personal name Soběslav, meaning "the village of Soběslav's people".

== Geography ==
Soběslavice is located about 16 kilometres (10 mi) south of Liberec. It lies in the Jičín Uplands. The highest point is at 395 m (1,296 ft) above sea level.

== History ==
The first written mention of Soběslavice is from 1371.

== Demographics ==
Historical population

Year	Pop.	±%
1869	471	—
1880	506	+7.4%
1890	487	−3.8%
1900	453	−7.0%
1910	421	−7.1%

Year	Pop.	±%
1921	420	−0.2%
1930	367	−12.6%
1950	269	−26.7%
1961	252	−6.3%
1970	221	−12.3%

Year	Pop.	±%
1980	183	−17.2%
1991	145	−20.8%
2001	132	−9.0%
2011	167	+26.5%
2021	159	−4.8%

Source: Censuses

== Transport ==
There are no railways or major roads passing through the municipality.

== Sights ==
The main landmark of Soběslavice is the Chapel of Saint John of Nepomuk. It was probably built in 1831, but it is equipped with a bell from 1772.
