= Šimonovice =

- Municipality
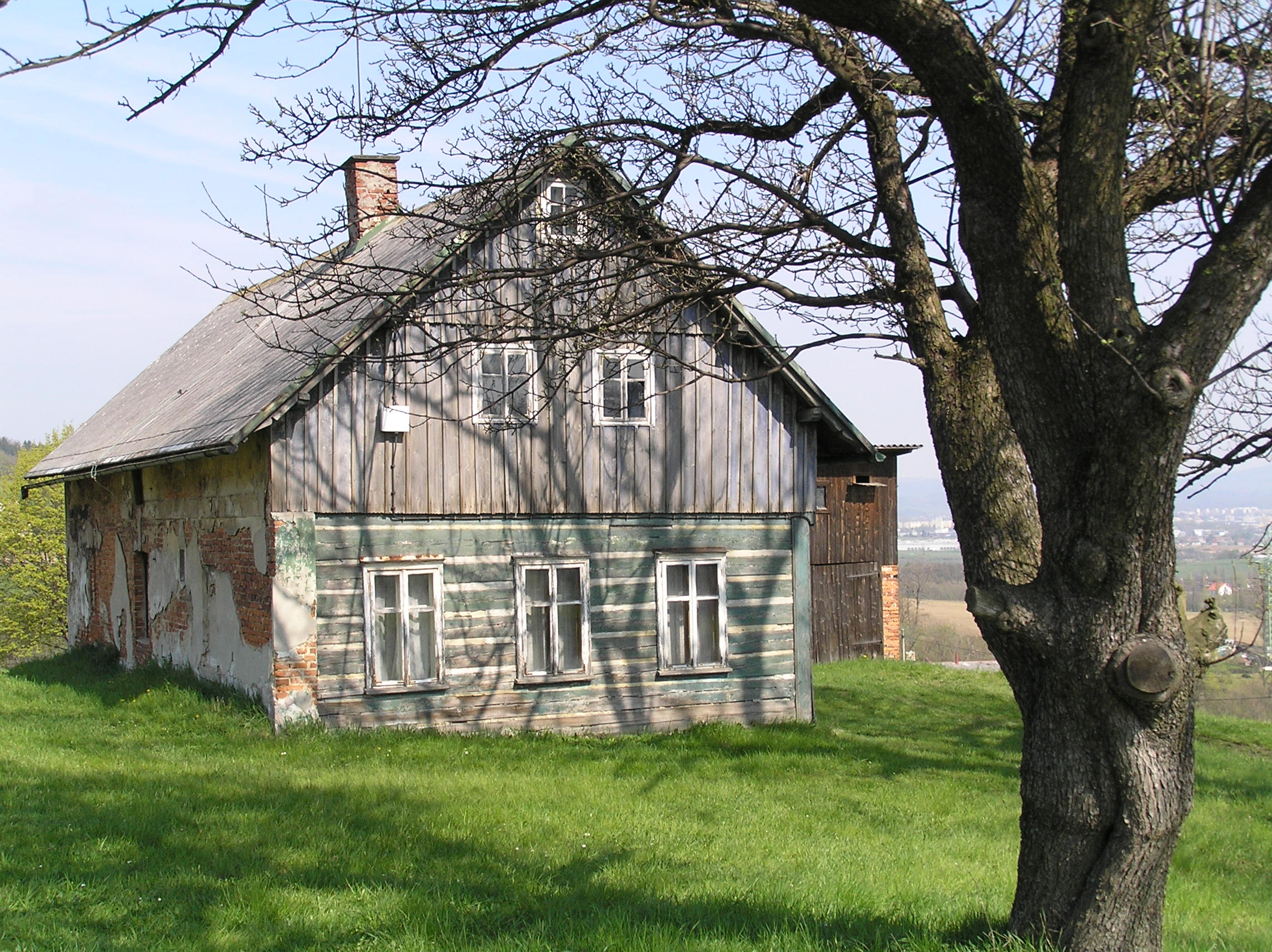
- Folk architecture in Šimonovice

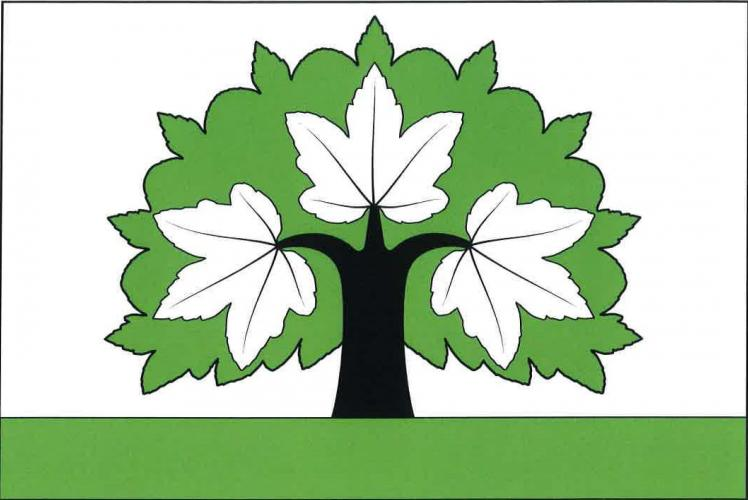
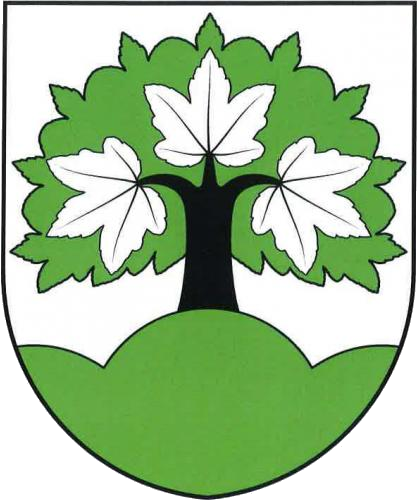
- Flag Coat of arms

- Location in the Czech Republic
- Coordinates: 50°42′23″N 15°3′10″E
- Country: Czech Republic
- Region: Liberec
- District: Liberec
- First mentioned: 1545

Area
  - Total: 7.19 km^{2} (2.78 sq mi)
- Elevation: 485 m (1,591 ft)

Population (2026-01-01)
  - Total: 1,536
  - Density: 214/km^{2} (553/sq mi)
- Time zone: UTC+1 (CET)
  - Summer (DST): UTC+2 (CEST)
- Postal code: 463 12
- Website: www.simonovice.cz

Šimonovice (German: Schimsdorf) is a municipality and village in Liberec District in the Liberec Region of the Czech Republic. It has about 1,500 inhabitants.

== Administrative division ==
Šimonovice consists of three municipal parts (in brackets population according to the 2021 census):

- Šimonovice (219)
- Minkovice (1,135)
- Rašovka (60)

== History ==
The first written mention Šimonovice is from 1545.

== Demographics ==
Historical population
Year	Pop.	±%
1869	846	—
1880	762	−9.9%
1890	753	−1.2%
1900	685	−9.0%
1910	681	−0.6%
1921	623	−8.5%
1930	786	+26.2%
1950	455	−42.1%
1961	373	−18.0%
1970	309	−17.2%
1980	329	+6.5%
1991	305	−7.3%
2001	355	+16.4%
2011	858	+141.7%
2021	1,414	+64.8%
Source: Censuses
