= Janovice v Podještědí =

- Municipality
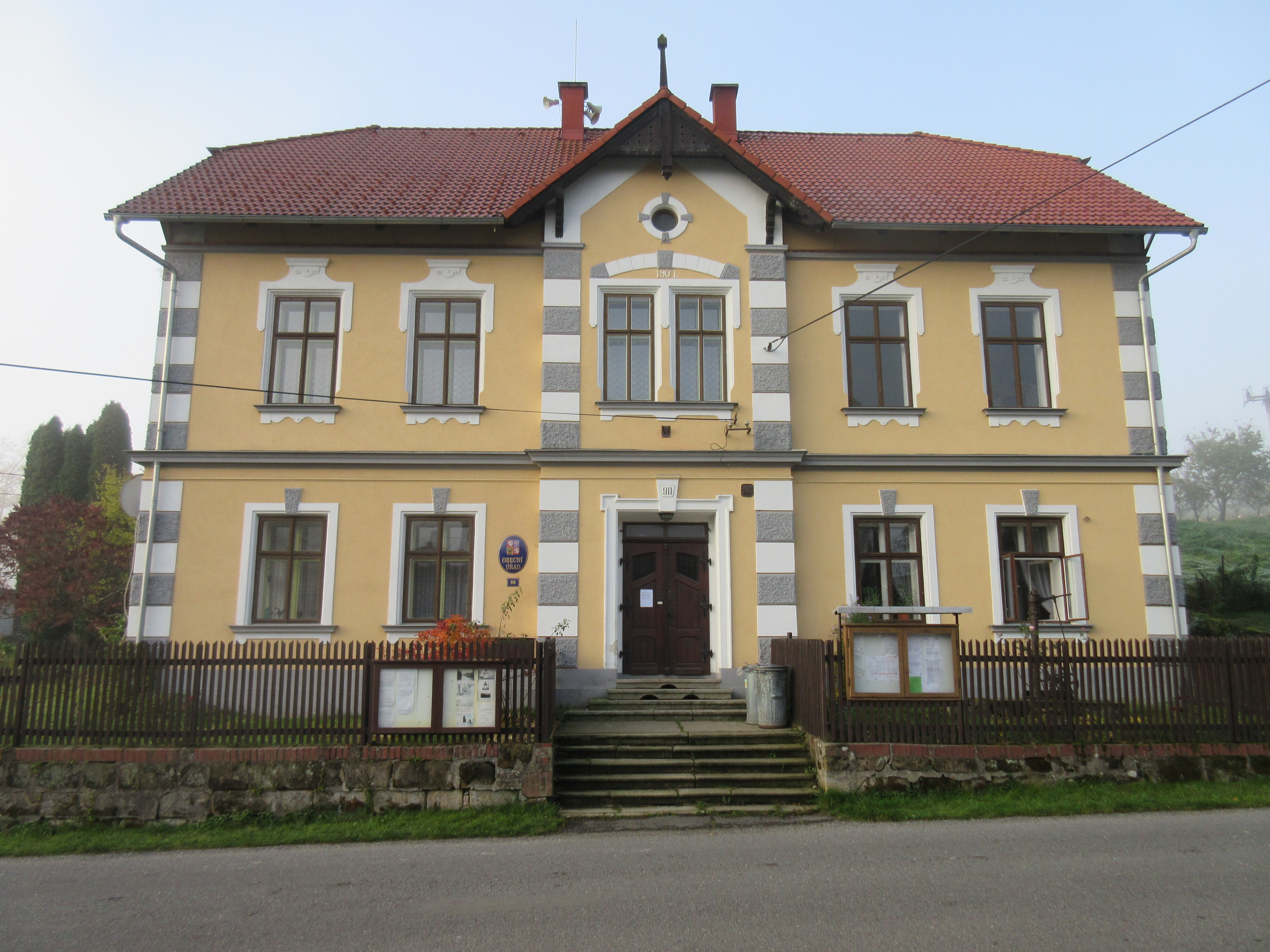
- Municipal office

- Location in the Czech Republic
- Coordinates: 50°45′47″N 14°49′28″E
- Country: Czech Republic
- Region: Liberec
- District: Liberec
- First mentioned: 1518

Area
  - Total: 6.34 km^{2} (2.45 sq mi)
- Elevation: 311 m (1,020 ft)

Population (2026-01-01)
  - Total: 90
  - Density: 14/km^{2} (37/sq mi)
- Time zone: UTC+1 (CET)
  - Summer (DST): UTC+2 (CEST)
- Postal code: 463 53
- Website: www.janovicevpodjestedi.eu

Janovice v Podještědí (German: Johnsdorf) is a municipality and village in Liberec District in the Liberec Region of the Czech Republic. It has about 90 inhabitants.

== History ==
The first written mention of Janovice v Podještědí is from 1518.

== Demographics ==
Historical population
Year	Pop.	±%
1869	465	—
1880	408	−12.3%
1890	382	−6.4%
1900	364	−4.7%
1910	368	+1.1%
1921	320	−13.0%
1930	332	+3.8%
1950	182	−45.2%
1961	154	−15.4%
1970	106	−31.2%
1980	98	−7.5%
1991	87	−11.2%
2001	84	−3.4%
2011	82	−2.4%
2021	95	+15.9%
Source: Censuses
