= Janův Důl =

- Municipality
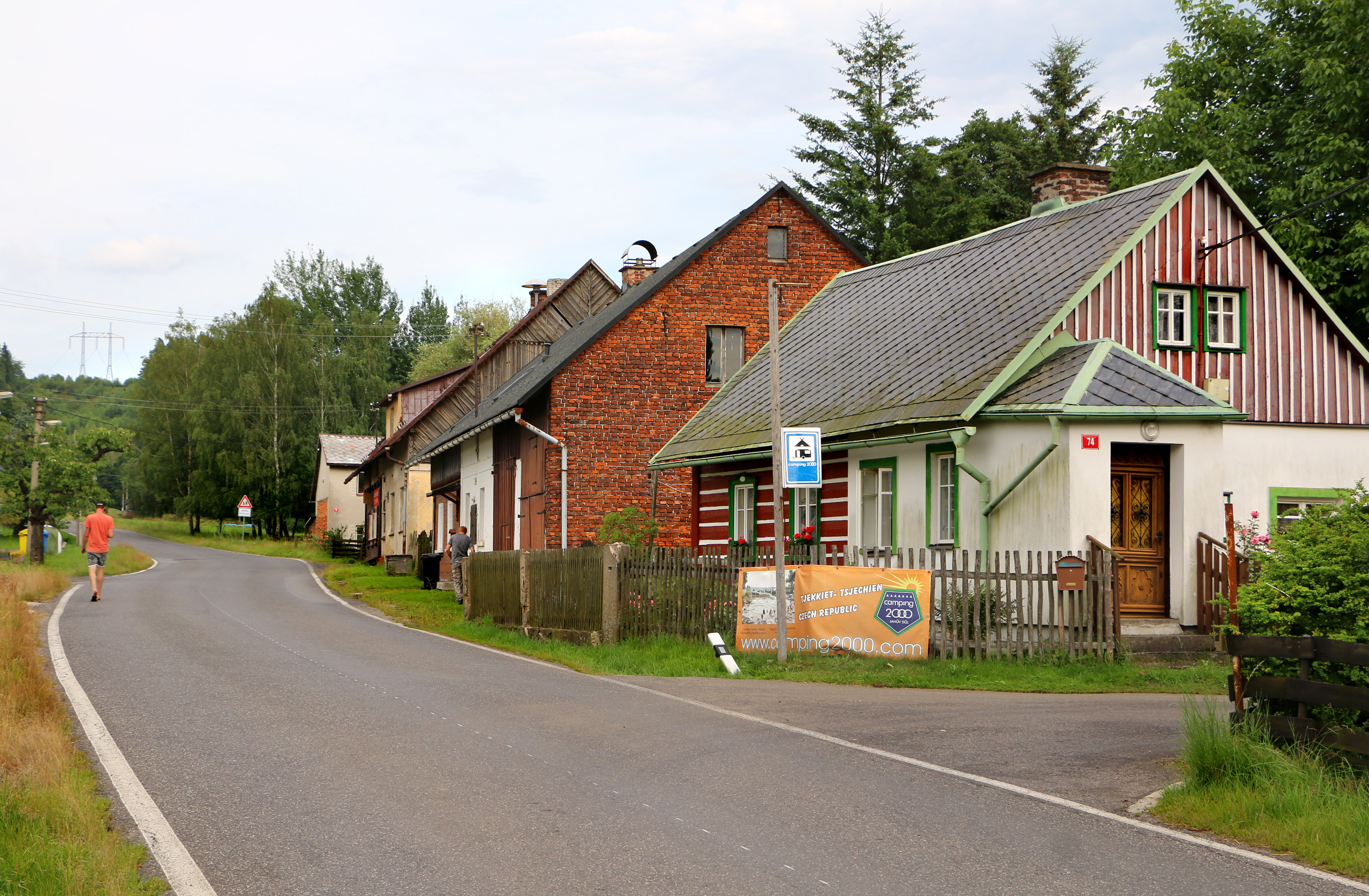
- Middle part of Janův Důl

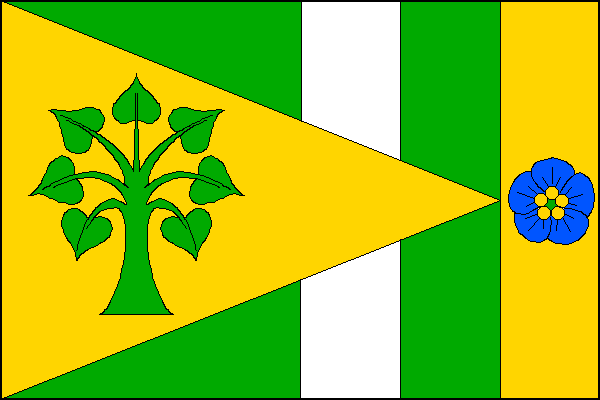
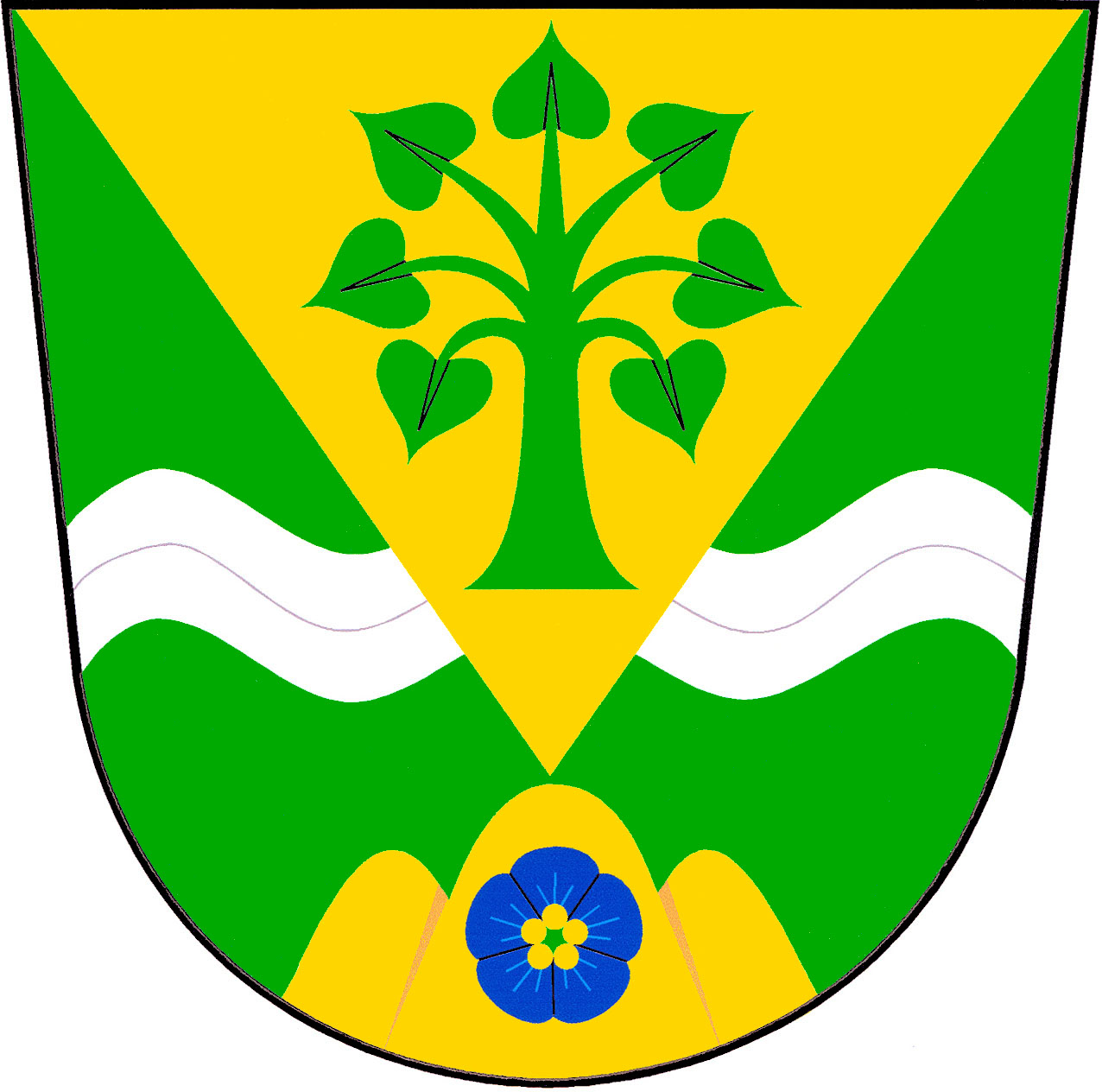
- Flag Coat of arms

- Location in the Czech Republic
- Coordinates: 50°42′17″N 14°56′25″E
- Country: Czech Republic
- Region: Liberec
- District: Liberec
- Founded: 1569

Area
  - Total: 4.55 km^{2} (1.76 sq mi)
- Elevation: 399 m (1,309 ft)

Population (2026-01-01)
  - Total: 180
  - Density: 40/km^{2} (100/sq mi)
- Time zone: UTC+1 (CET)
  - Summer (DST): UTC+2 (CEST)
- Postal code: 463 52
- Website: januvdul.cz

Janův Důl (German: Johannesthal) is a municipality and village in Liberec District in the Liberec Region of the Czech Republic. It has about 200 inhabitants.

== Etymology ==
The name means "Jan's/Johannes' valley" in Czech and German respectively. The village was named that way in 1704, after its owner Count Jan Václav of Gallas.

== Geography ==
Janův Důl is located about 9 kilometres (6 mi) southwest of Liberec. In lies in the Ralsko Uplands. The highest point is at 520 m (1,706 ft) above sea level. The upper course of the Ploučnice River flows through the municipality.

== History ==
Janův Důl was founded in 1569.

== Demographics ==
Historical population

Year	Pop.	±%
1869	425	—
1880	382	−10.1%
1890	355	−7.1%
1900	344	−3.1%
1910	321	−6.7%

Year	Pop.	±%
1921	291	−9.3%
1930	284	−2.4%
1950	156	−45.1%
1961	148	−5.1%
1970	145	−2.0%

Year	Pop.	±%
1980	147	+1.4%
1991	147	+0.0%
2001	137	−6.8%
2011	145	+5.8%
2021	170	+17.2%

Source: Censuses

== Transport ==
There are no railways or major roads passing through the municipality.

== Sights ==
There are no protected cultural monuments in the municipality. The main cultural landmark is the Chapel of Saint John of Nepomuk, built in 1796.
