= Žďárek =

- Municipality
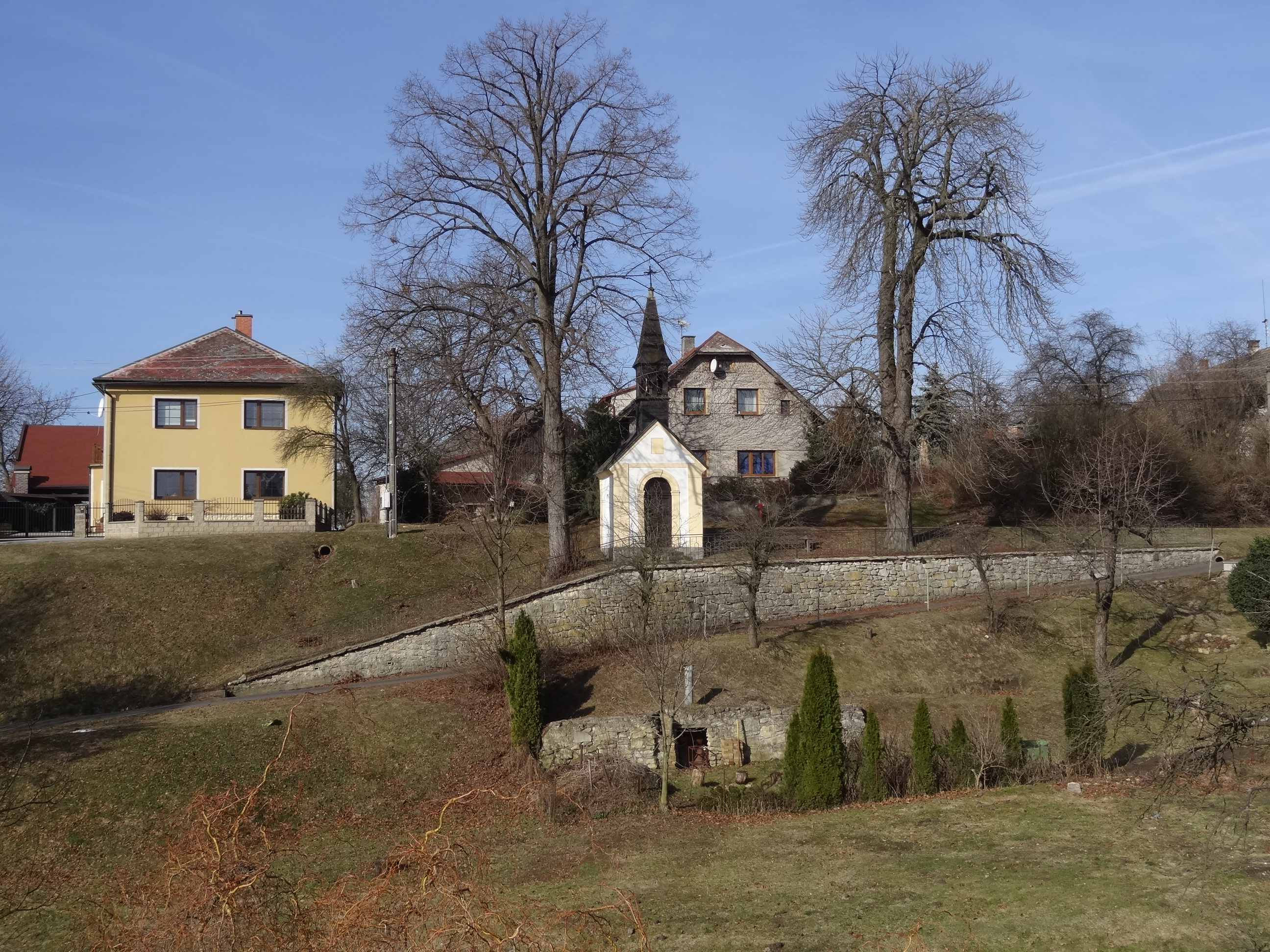
- Centre of Žďárek

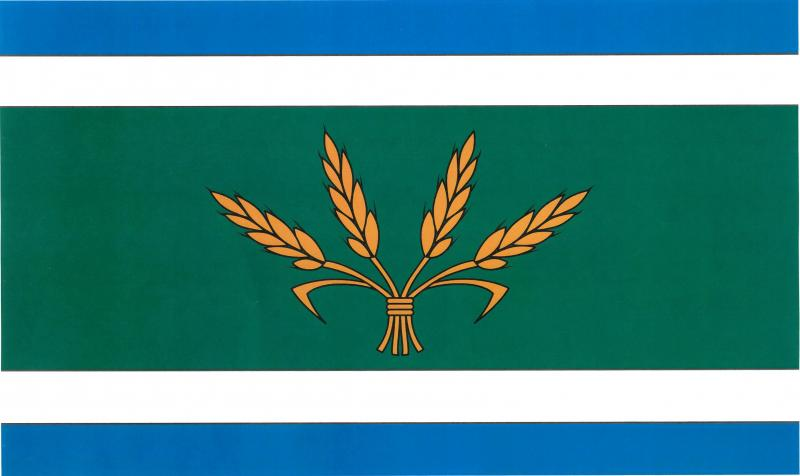
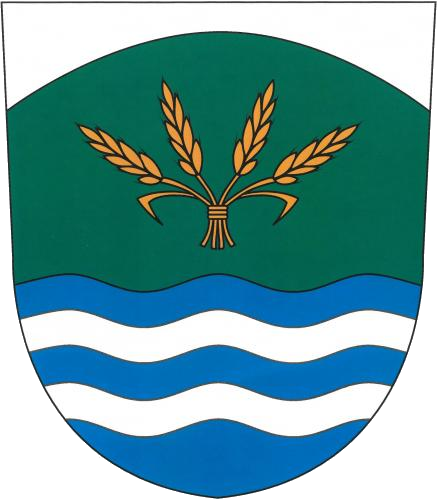
- Flag Coat of arms

- Location in the Czech Republic
- Coordinates: 50°38′26″N 15°6′42″E
- Country: Czech Republic
- Region: Liberec
- District: Liberec
- First mentioned: 1600

Area
  - Total: 2.33 km^{2} (0.90 sq mi)
- Elevation: 407 m (1,335 ft)

Population (2026-01-01)
  - Total: 165
  - Density: 70.8/km^{2} (183/sq mi)
- Time zone: UTC+1 (CET)
  - Summer (DST): UTC+2 (CEST)
- Postal code: 463 44
- Website: www.zdarek.net

Žďárek (German: Scharingen) is a municipality and village in Liberec District in the Liberec Region of the Czech Republic. It has about 200 inhabitants.

== History ==
The first written mention of Žďárek is from 1600.

== Demographics ==
Historical population
Year	Pop.	±%
1869	217	—
1880	284	+30.9%
1890	281	−1.1%
1900	262	−6.8%
1910	223	−14.9%
1921	215	−3.6%
1930	210	−2.3%
1950	151	−28.1%
1961	139	−7.9%
1970	121	−12.9%
1980	111	−8.3%
1991	106	−4.5%
2001	121	+14.2%
2011	127	+5.0%
2021	162	+27.6%
Source: Censuses
