= Bílý Kostel nad Nisou =

- Municipality
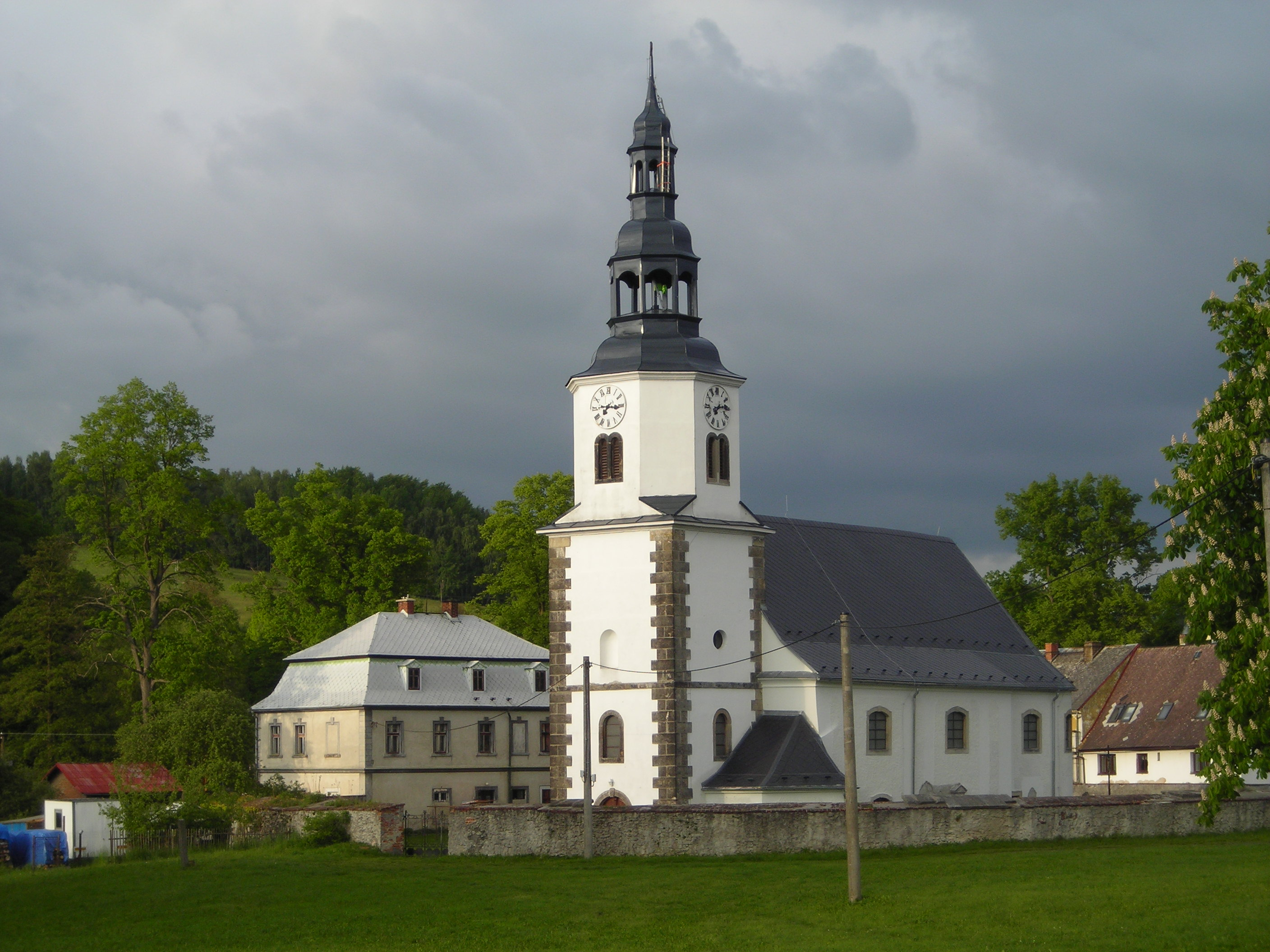
- Church of Saint Nicholas

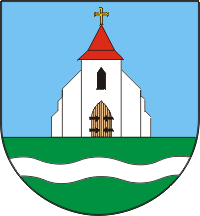
- Flag Coat of arms

- Location in the Czech Republic
- Coordinates: 50°49′24″N 14°55′28″E
- Country: Czech Republic
- Region: Liberec
- District: Liberec
- First mentioned: 1352

Area
  - Total: 25.73 km^{2} (9.93 sq mi)
- Elevation: 275 m (902 ft)

Population (2026-01-01)
  - Total: 1,097
  - Density: 42.64/km^{2} (110.4/sq mi)
- Time zone: UTC+1 (CET)
  - Summer (DST): UTC+2 (CEST)
- Postal code: 463 31
- Website: www.bily-kostel.cz

Bílý Kostel nad Nisou (German: Weißkirchen) is a municipality and village in Liberec District in the Liberec Region of the Czech Republic. It has about 1,100 inhabitants.

Bílý Kostel nad Nisou lies approximately 11 kilometres (7 mi) west of Liberec and 90 km (56 mi) north of Prague.

== Administrative division ==
Bílý Kostel nad Nisou consists of three municipal parts (in brackets population according to the 2021 census):

- Bílý Kostel nad Nisou (988)
- Panenská Hůrka (20)
- Pekařka (55)

== Demographics ==
Historical population
Year	Pop.	±%
1869	1,630	—
1880	1,660	+1.8%
1890	1,658	−0.1%
1900	1,600	−3.5%
1910	1,731	+8.2%
1921	1,557	−10.1%
1930	1,652	+6.1%
1950	943	−42.9%
1961	959	+1.7%
1970	893	−6.9%
1980	874	−2.1%
1991	743	−15.0%
2001	771	+3.8%
2011	871	+13.0%
2021	1,063	+22.0%
Source: Censuses
