= Liberec District =

Liberec District Okres Liberec
- District
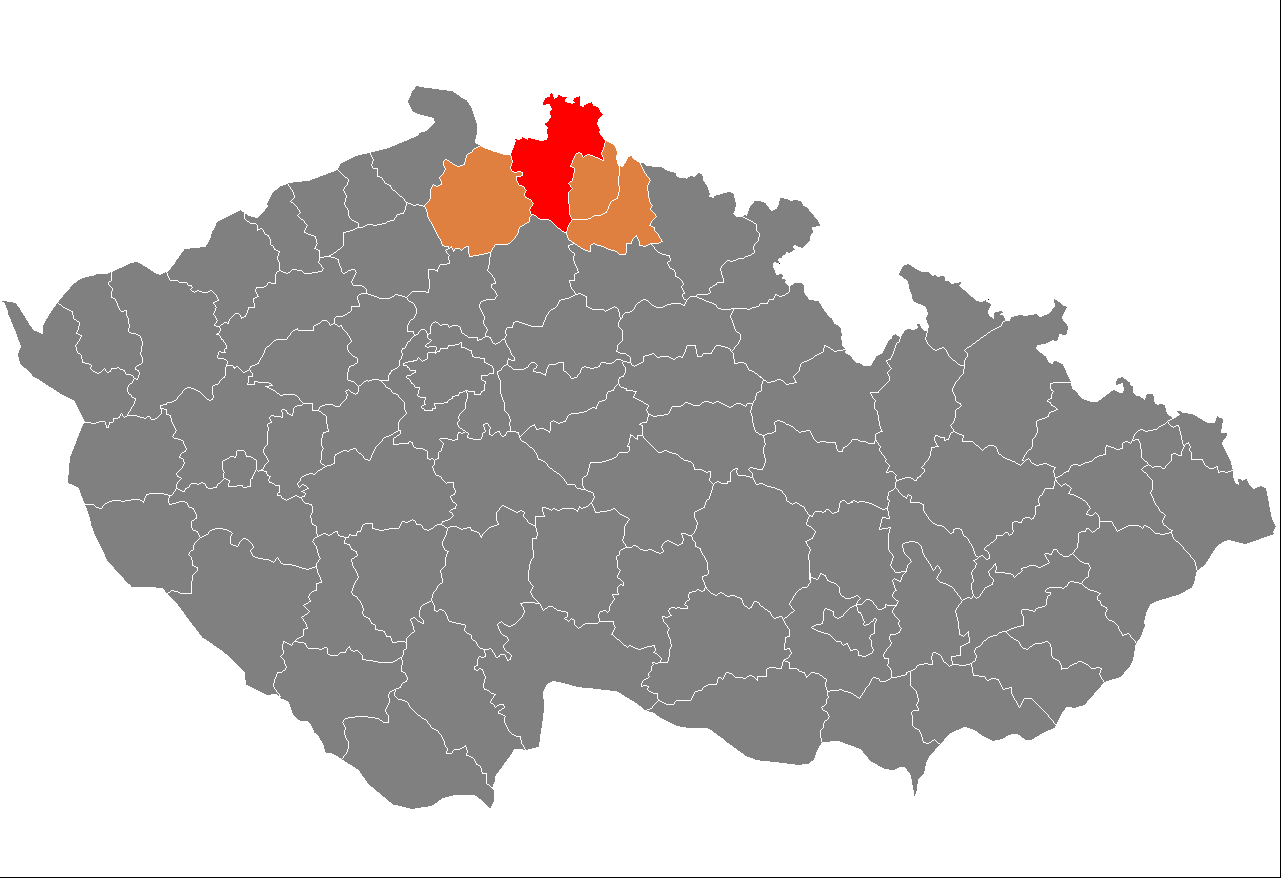
- Location in the Liberec Region within the Czech Republic
- Coordinates: 50°50′N 15°3′E
- Country: Czech Republic
- Region: Liberec
- Capital: Liberec

Area
  - Total: 989.34 km^{2} (381.99 sq mi)

Population (2026)
  - Total: 181,092
  - Density: 183.04/km^{2} (474.08/sq mi)
- Time zone: UTC+1 (CET)
  - Summer (DST): UTC+2 (CEST)
- Municipalities: 59
- * Cities and towns: 11
- * Market towns: 1

Liberec District (Czech: okres Liberec) is a district in the Liberec Region of the Czech Republic. Its capital is the city of Liberec.

== Administrative division ==
Liberec District is divided into three administrative districts of municipalities with extended competence: Liberec, Frýdlant and Turnov. The town of Turnov is located in the neighbouring Semily District and it is the only such administrative district in the country whose borders do not correspond to the borders of the district.

=== List of municipalities ===
Cities and towns are marked in bold and market towns in italics:

Bílá - Bílý Kostel nad Nisou - Bílý Potok - Bulovka - Černousy - Český Dub - Cetenov - Chotyně - Chrastava - Čtveřín - Dětřichov - Dlouhý Most - Dolní Řasnice - Frýdlant - Habartice - Hejnice - Heřmanice - Hlavice - Hodkovice nad Mohelkou - Horní Řasnice - Hrádek nad Nisou - Jablonné v Podještědí - Janovice v Podještědí - Janův Důl - Jeřmanice - Jindřichovice pod Smrkem - Kobyly - Krásný Les - Křižany - Kryštofovo Údolí - Kunratice - Lázně Libverda - Lažany - Liberec - Mníšek - Nová Ves - Nové Město pod Smrkem - Oldřichov v Hájích - Osečná - Paceřice - Pěnčín - Pertoltice - Příšovice - Proseč pod Ještědem - Radimovice - Raspenava - Rynoltice - Šimonovice - Soběslavice - Stráž nad Nisou - Světlá pod Ještědem - Svijanský Újezd - Svijany - Sychrov - Višňová - Vlastibořice - Všelibice - Žďárek - Zdislava

== Geography ==
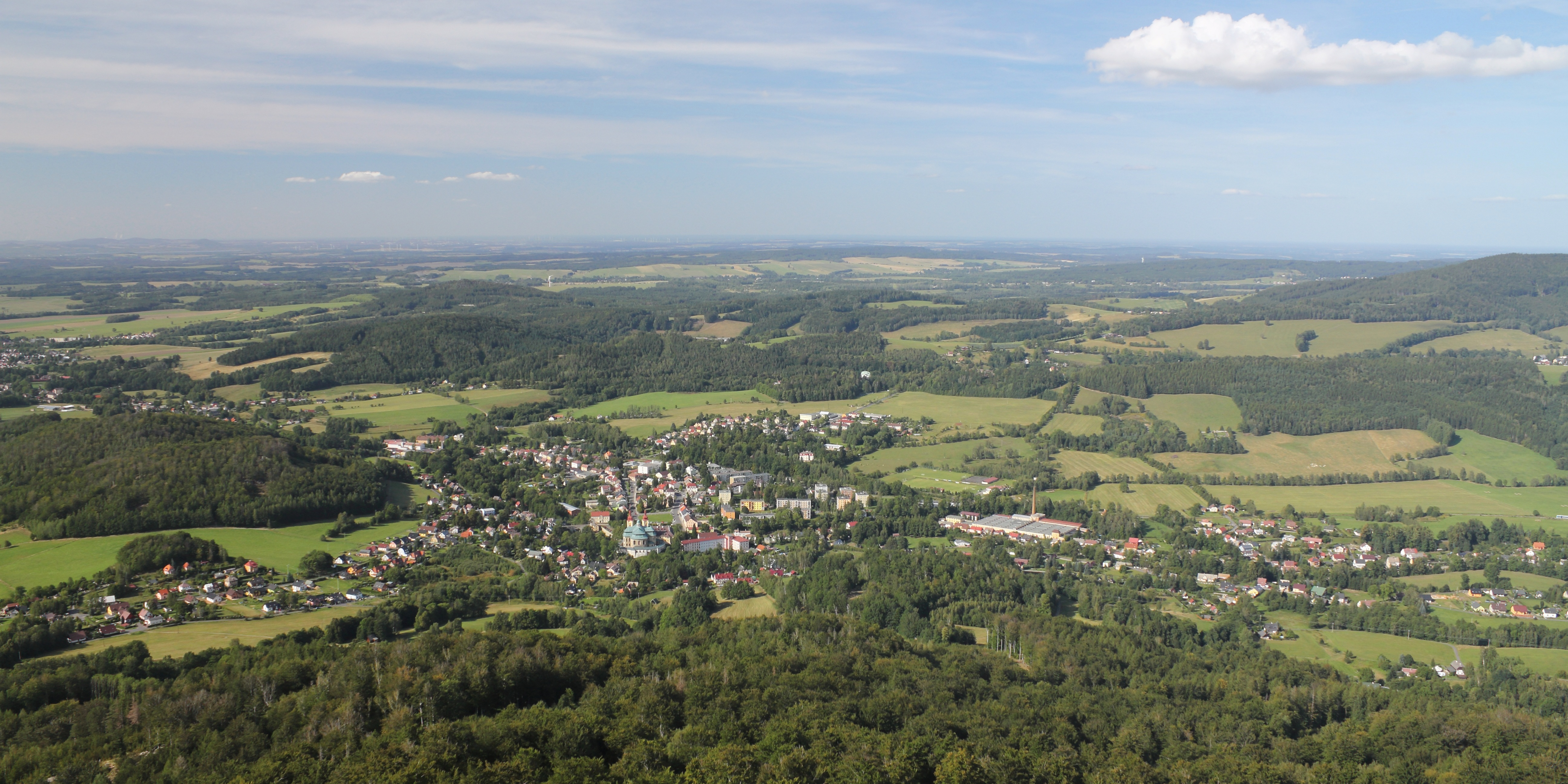
Hejnice and surrounding landscape

Liberec District borders Poland in the north and briefly Germany in the northwest. The terrain is very diverse, with large differences in altitude, and hilly landscape prevails. The territory extends into seven geomorphological mesoregions: Jizera Foothills (north), Jizera Mountains (east), Zittau Basin (centre), Ještěd–Kozákov Ridge (a strip from centre to southeast), Jičín Uplands (south), Ralsko Uplands (southwest) and Lusatian Mountains (a small part in the west). The highest point of the district is the mountain Smrk in Lázně Libverda with an elevation of 1,124 m (3,688 ft), the most dominant feature of the southern part of the district is Ještěd at 1,012 m (3,320 ft). The lowest point is the river bed of the Smědá in Černousy at 210 m (690 ft).

From the total district area of 989.3 km^{2} (382.0 sq mi), agricultural land occupies 465.4 km^{2} (179.7 sq mi), forests occupy 421.3 km^{2} (162.7 sq mi), and water area occupies 9.8 km^{2} (3.8 sq mi). Forests cover 42.6% of the district's area.

Several notable rivers originate in the territory. The Lusatian Neisse and Smědá drain water into the Baltic Sea, and the Ploučnice and Jizera drain water into the North Sea. The area is poor in bodies of water.

The Jizerské hory Protected Landscape Area is located in the east of the district. It includes the Czech part of the UNESCO World Heritage Site named Ancient and Primeval Beech Forests of the Carpathians and Other Regions of Europe. The second protected landscape area in the territory is Lužické hory, situated in the west.

== Demographics ==
Historical population

Year	Pop.	±%
1869	165,637	—
1880	177,893	+7.4%
1890	186,668	+4.9%
1900	203,000	+8.7%
1910	214,009	+5.4%

Year	Pop.	±%
1921	196,426	−8.2%
1930	205,822	+4.8%
1950	135,713	−34.1%
1961	145,399	+7.1%
1970	148,250	+2.0%

Year	Pop.	±%
1980	161,289	+8.8%
1991	163,107	+1.1%
2001	162,780	−0.2%
2011	169,878	+4.4%
2021	174,225	+2.6%

Source: Censuses

=== Most populous municipalities ===
Name	Population	Area (km^{2})
Liberec	108,214	106
Hrádek nad Nisou	8,009	49
Frýdlant	7,332	32
Chrastava	6,349	27
Nové Město pod Smrkem	3,713	29
Jablonné v Podještědí	3,672	58
Hodkovice nad Mohelkou	3,024	13
Český Dub	2,901	23
Raspenava	2,784	41
Hejnice	2,726	38

== Economy ==
The largest employers with headquarters in Liberec District and at least 1,000 employees are:

Economic entity	Location	Number of employees	Main activity
Regional Hospital Liberec	Liberec	4,000–4,999	Health care
Denso Manufacturing	Liberec	2,000–2,499	Manufacture of cooling and ventilation equipment for motor vehicles
Drylock Technologies	Hrádek nad Nisou	1,500–1,999	Manufacture of hygiene needs
Magna Exteriors (Bohemia)	Liberec	1,500–1,999	Manufacture of parts for motor vehicles
Regional Police Directorate of the Liberec Region	Liberec	1,500–1,999	Public order and safety activities
Technical University of Liberec	Liberec	1,500–1,999	Education
Benteler ČR	Chrastava	1,000–1,499	Manufacture of parts for motor vehicles

== Transport ==
A short section of the D10 motorway from Prague, which further continues as the R/35 expressway to Liberec and Chrastava (part of the European route E442) and then forks to the I/13 road to Děčín and to the I/35 road to Zittau, runs through the district. A section of the I/35 road runs from Liberec to Frýdlant and the Czech–Polish border.

== Sights ==
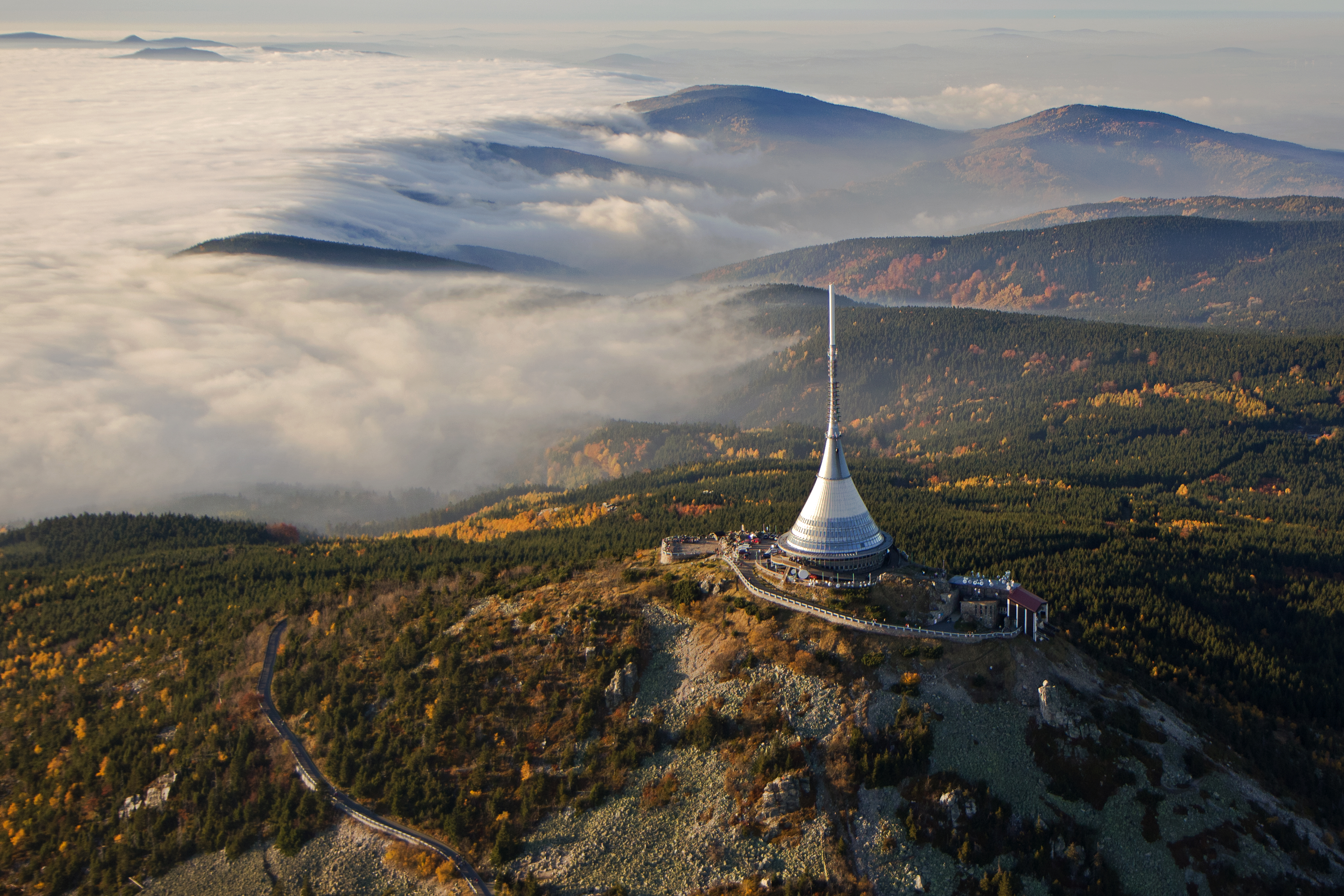
Ještěd Tower

The most important monuments in the district, protected as national cultural monuments, are:

- Sychrov Castle
- Lemberk Castle
- Frýdlant Castle
- Ještěd Tower
- Grabštejn Castle
- Basilica of Saints Lawrence and Zdislava in Jablonné v Podještědí
- Pilgrimage complex with the Church of the Visitation in Hejnice
- Liberec City Hall

The best-preserved settlements and landscapes, protected as monument zones, are:

- Český Dub
- Frýdlant
- Hodkovice nad Mohelkou
- Hrádek nad Nisou
- Jablonné v Podještědí
- Liberec
- Kryštofovo Údolí
- Lembersko landscape

The most visited tourist destinations are the Liberec Zoo, iQ Landia science centre in Liberec, DinoPark Liberec, Centrum Babylon Liberec, and Sychrov Castle.
