= Příšovice =

- Municipality
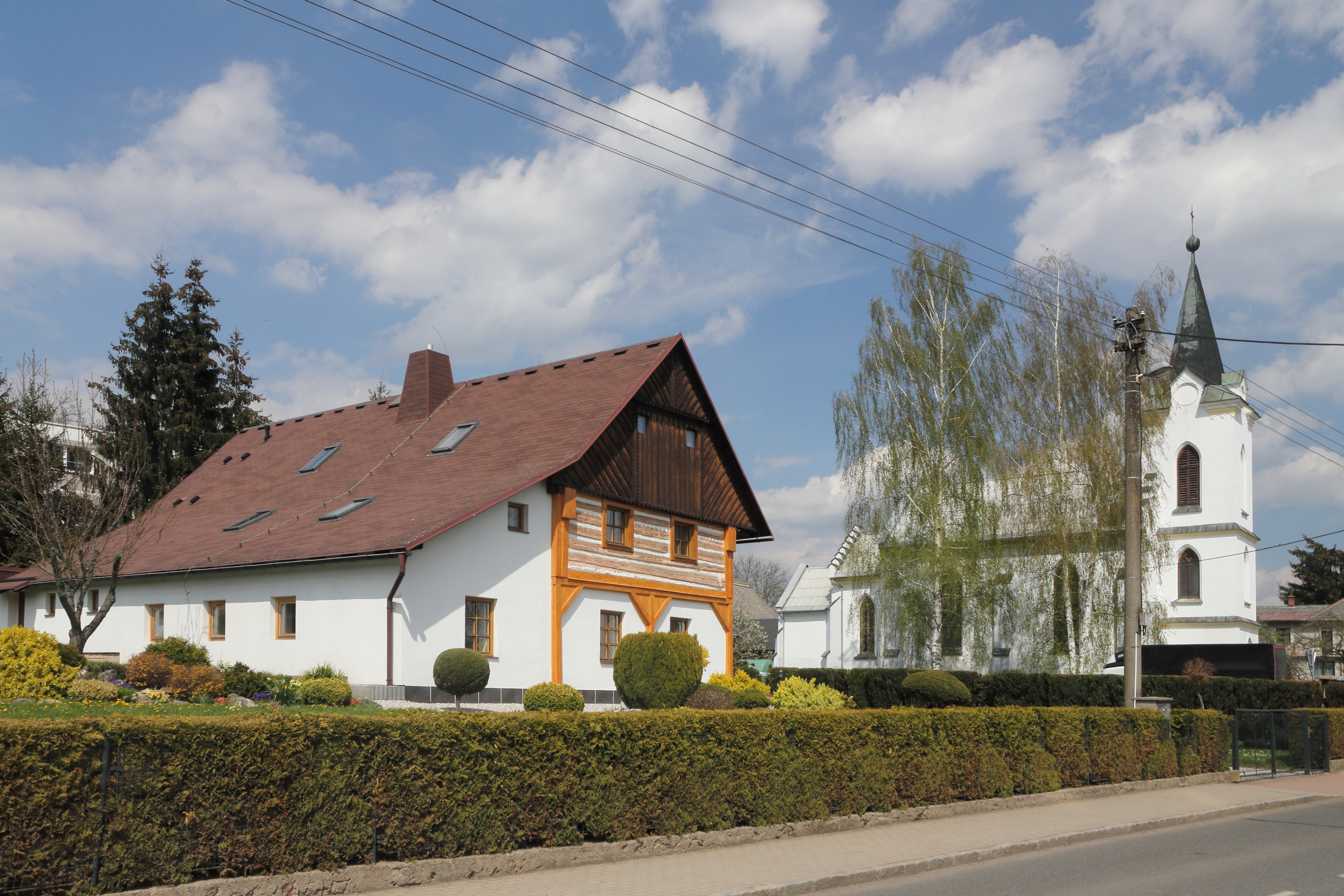
- Chapel of Saint Wenceslaus

- Flag Coat of arms

- Location in the Czech Republic
- Coordinates: 50°34′41″N 15°5′2″E
- Country: Czech Republic
- Region: Liberec
- District: Liberec
- First mentioned: 1318

Area
  - Total: 6.14 km^{2} (2.37 sq mi)
- Elevation: 240 m (790 ft)

Population (2026-01-01)
  - Total: 1,343
  - Density: 219/km^{2} (567/sq mi)
- Time zone: UTC+1 (CET)
  - Summer (DST): UTC+2 (CEST)
- Postal code: 463 46
- Website: www.prisovice.cz

Příšovice is a municipality and village in Liberec District in the Liberec Region of the Czech Republic. It has about 1,300 inhabitants.

== History ==
The first written mention of Příšovice is from 1318.

== Demographics ==
Historical population
Year	Pop.	±%
1869	480	—
1880	547	+14.0%
1890	611	+11.7%
1900	590	−3.4%
1910	641	+8.6%
1921	533	−16.8%
1930	661	+24.0%
1950	629	−4.8%
1961	595	−5.4%
1970	614	+3.2%
1980	1,501	+144.5%
1991	1,386	−7.7%
2001	1,282	−7.5%
2011	1,369	+6.8%
2021	1,238	−9.6%
Source: Censuses
