= Dětřichov (Liberec District) =

- Municipality
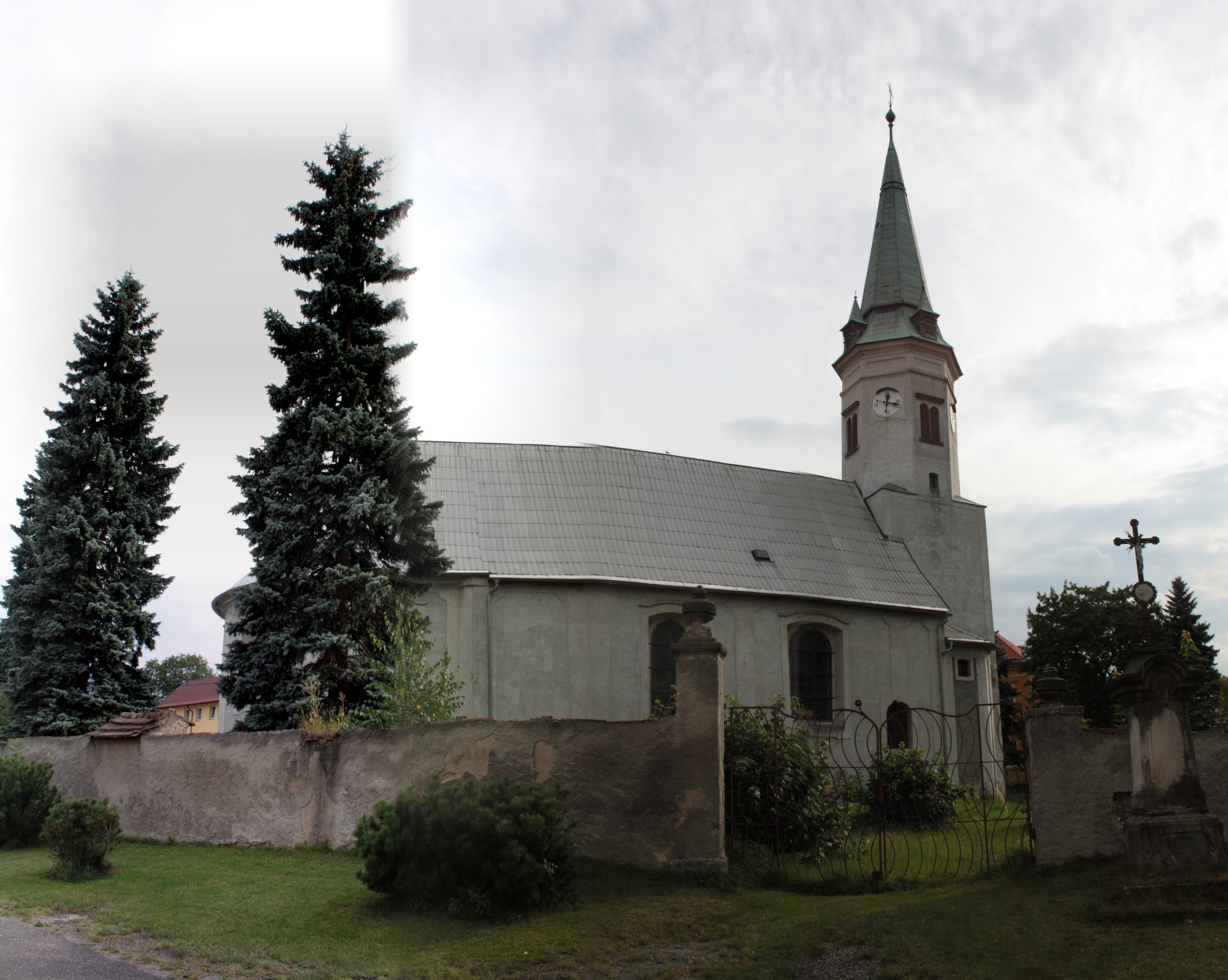
- Church of Saint Anne

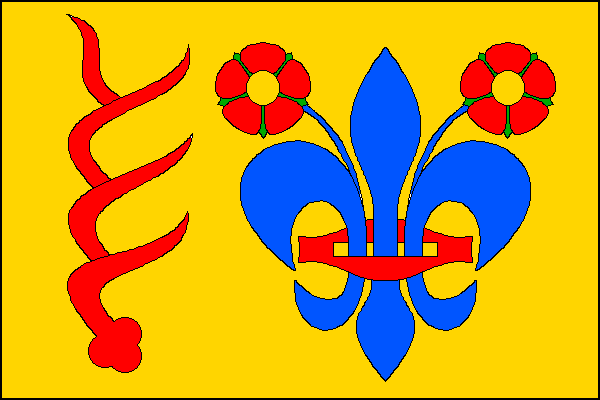
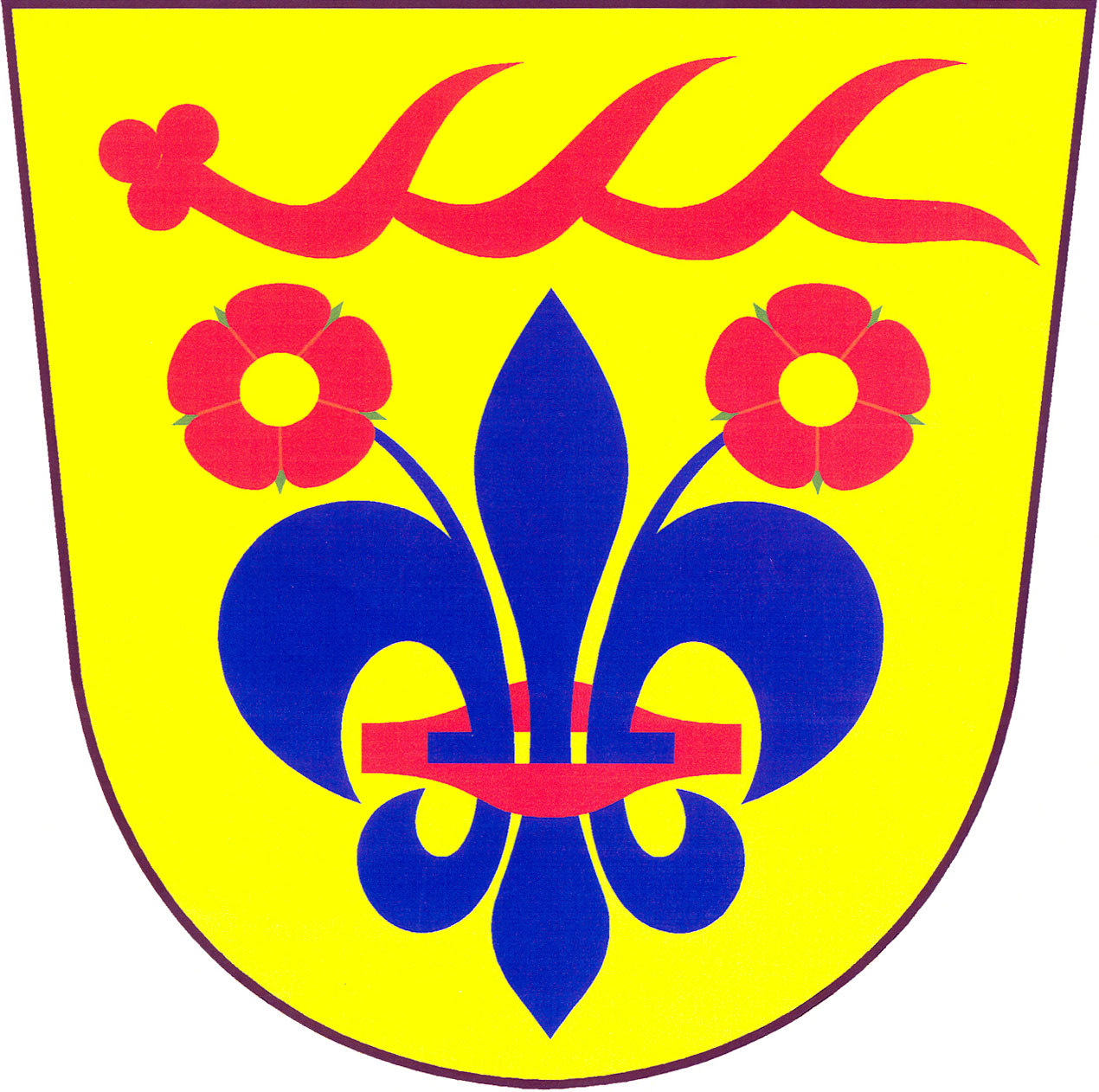
- Flag Coat of arms

- Location in the Czech Republic
- Coordinates: 50°53′34″N 15°2′12″E
- Country: Czech Republic
- Region: Liberec
- District: Liberec
- First mentioned: 1381

Area
  - Total: 9.72 km^{2} (3.75 sq mi)
- Elevation: 355 m (1,165 ft)

Population (2026-01-01)
  - Total: 731
  - Density: 75.2/km^{2} (195/sq mi)
- Time zone: UTC+1 (CET)
  - Summer (DST): UTC+2 (CEST)
- Postal code: 464 01
- Website: www.detrichov-obec.cz

Dětřichov (German: Dittersbach) is a municipality and village in Liberec District in the Liberec Region of the Czech Republic. It has about 700 inhabitants.

== History ==
The first written mention of Dětřichov is from 1381.

== Demographics ==
Historical population
Year	Pop.	±%
1869	1,252	—
1880	1,367	+9.2%
1890	1,409	+3.1%
1900	1,723	+22.3%
1910	1,687	−2.1%
1921	1,337	−20.7%
1930	1,237	−7.5%
1950	582	−53.0%
1961	609	+4.6%
1970	684	+12.3%
1980	605	−11.5%
1991	511	−15.5%
2001	590	+15.5%
2011	700	+18.6%
2021	696	−0.6%
Source: Censuses
