= Zdislava (Liberec District) =

- Market town
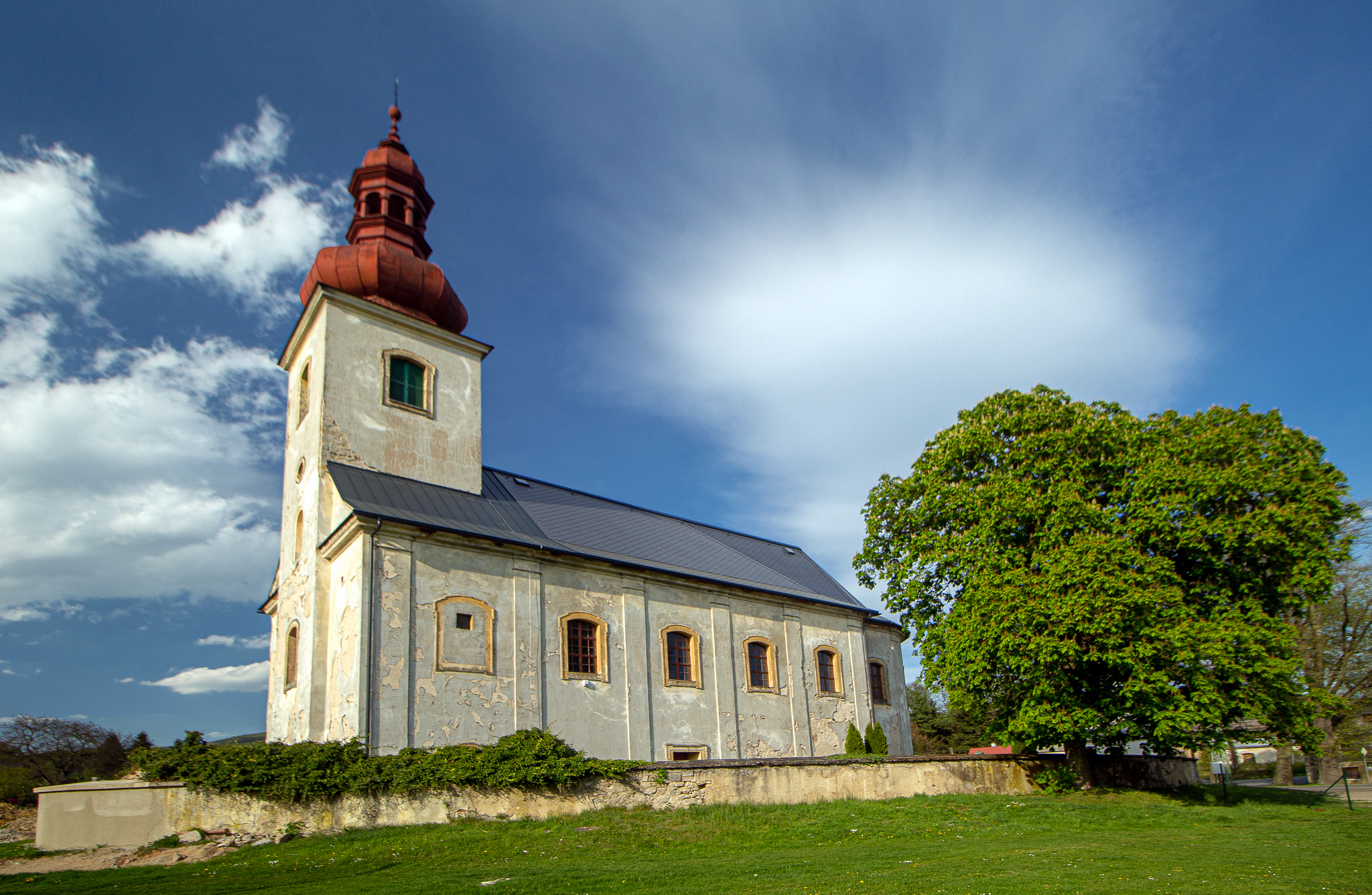
- Church of Saint John the Baptist

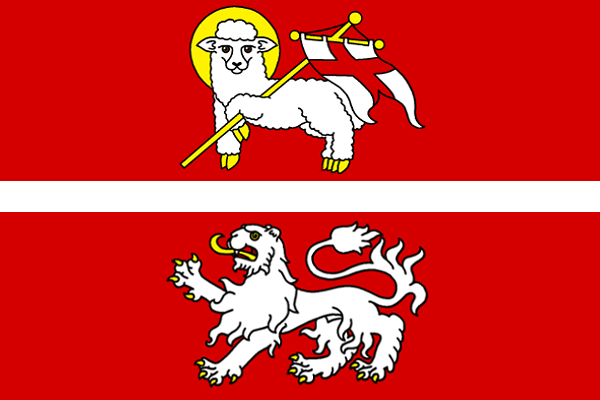
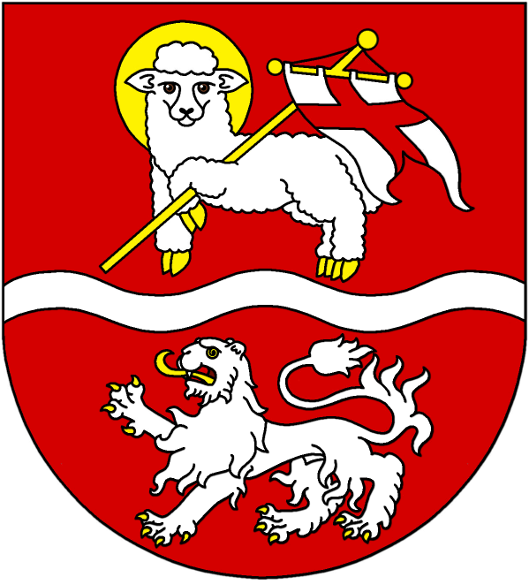
- Flag Coat of arms

- Location in the Czech Republic
- Coordinates: 50°45′54″N 14°52′35″E
- Country: Czech Republic
- Region: Liberec
- District: Liberec
- First mentioned: 1364

Area
  - Total: 9.80 km^{2} (3.78 sq mi)
- Elevation: 278 m (912 ft)

Population (2026-01-01)
  - Total: 271
  - Density: 27.7/km^{2} (71.6/sq mi)
- Time zone: UTC+1 (CET)
  - Summer (DST): UTC+2 (CEST)
- Postal code: 463 53
- Website: www.mestyszdislava.cz

Zdislava (Czech pronunciation: [ˈzɟɪslava]; German: Schönbach) is a market town in Liberec District in the Liberec Region of the Czech Republic. It has about 300 inhabitants.

== Etymology ==
The former German name Schönbach means 'beautiful stream'. After World War II, the settlement was renamed after Saint Zdislava.

== Geography ==
Zdislava is located about 12 kilometres (7 mi) west of Liberec. It lies on the border between the Ralsko Uplands and Ještěd–Kozákov Ridge. The highest point is on the slopes of the mountain Vápenný at 773 m (2,536 ft) above sea level. The stream Zdislavský potok originates on the slopes of Vápenný and then flows across the municipality.

== History ==
The first written mention of Schönbach is from 1364. In 1906, the village was promoted to a market town.

In 1947, the market town was renamed from Schönbach to its current name. In the 1970s, it was joined to neighbouring Křižany. Since 1990, Zdislava has been a separate municipality again.

== Demographics ==
Historical population

Year	Pop.	±%
1869	1,048	—
1880	932	−11.1%
1890	883	−5.3%
1900	842	−4.6%
1910	843	+0.1%

Year	Pop.	±%
1921	754	−10.6%
1930	739	−2.0%
1950	439	−40.6%
1961	376	−14.4%
1970	350	−6.9%

Year	Pop.	±%
1980	290	−17.1%
1991	233	−19.7%
2001	245	+5.2%
2011	284	+15.9%
2021	282	−0.7%

Source: Censuses

== Transport ==
Zdislava is located on the railway line Liberec–Děčín.

== Sights ==
The main landmark of Zdislava is the Church of Saint John the Baptist. It was built in the Baroque style in 1726.
