= Krásný Les (Liberec District) =

- Municipality
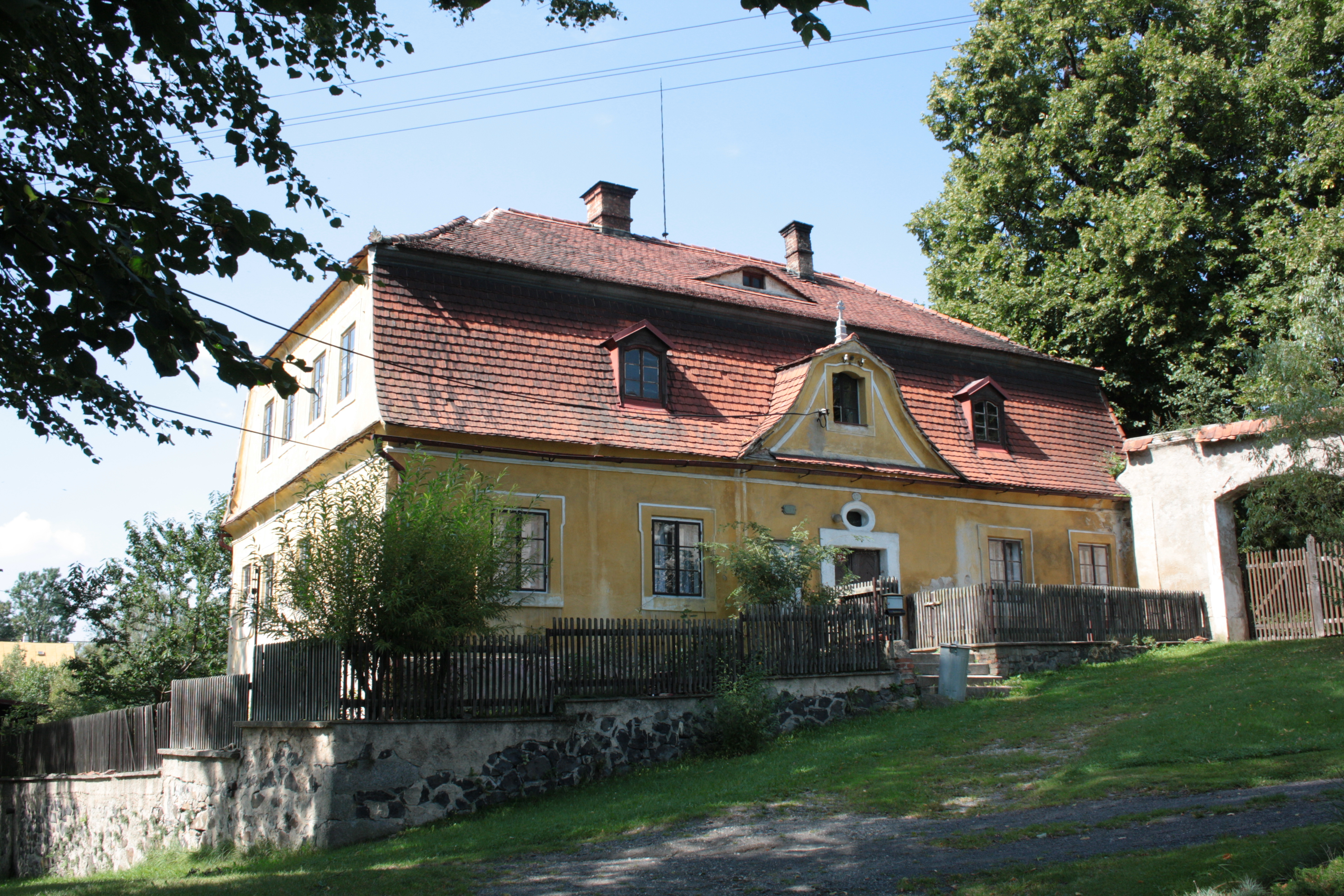
- Rectory

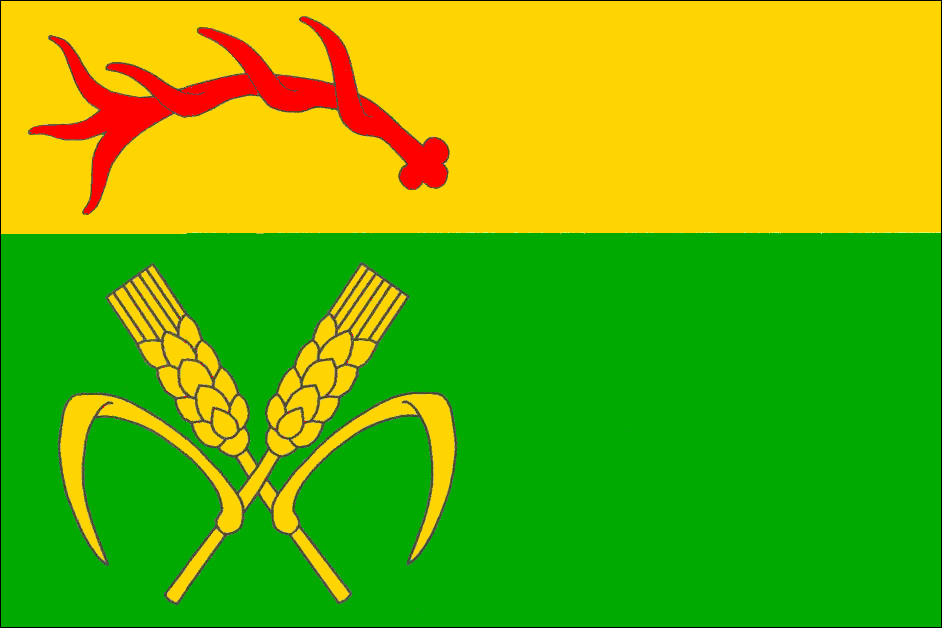
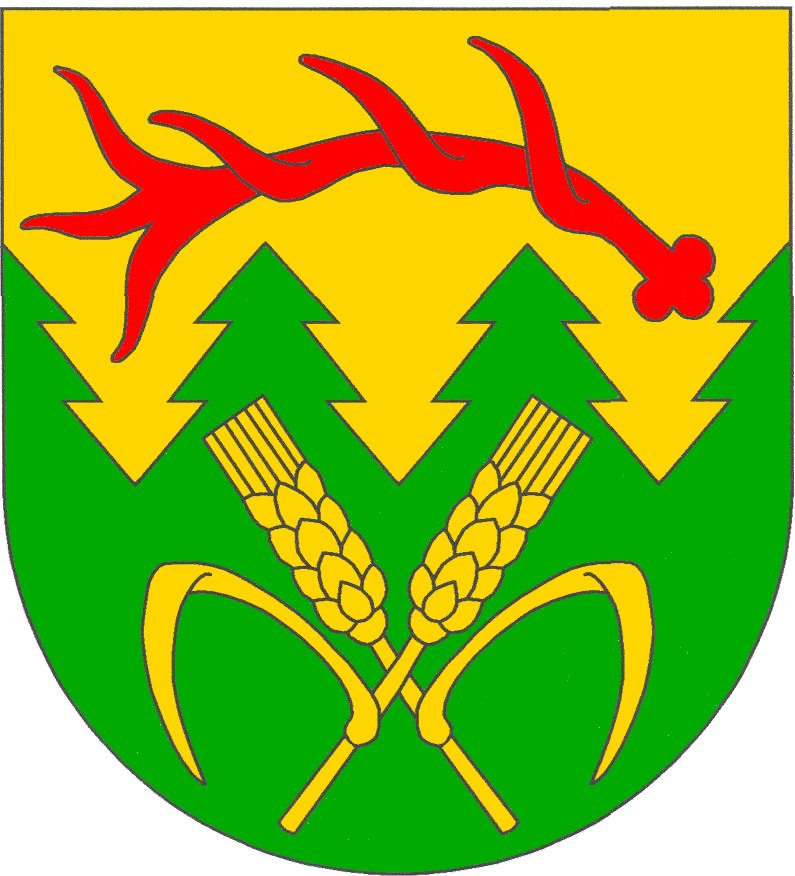
- Flag Coat of arms

- Location in the Czech Republic
- Coordinates: 50°56′25″N 15°7′40″E
- Country: Czech Republic
- Region: Liberec
- District: Liberec
- First mentioned: 1346

Area
  - Total: 13.48 km^{2} (5.20 sq mi)
- Elevation: 335 m (1,099 ft)

Population (2026-01-01)
  - Total: 474
  - Density: 35.2/km^{2} (91.1/sq mi)
- Time zone: UTC+1 (CET)
  - Summer (DST): UTC+2 (CEST)
- Postal code: 464 01
- Website: www.krasny-les.cz

Krásný Les (German: Schönwald) is a municipality and village in Liberec District in the Liberec Region of the Czech Republic. It has about 500 inhabitants.

== History ==
The first written mention of Krásný Les is from 1346. The village was probably founded at the beginning of the 14th century.

== Demographics ==
Historical population
Year	Pop.	±%
1869	1,120	—
1880	1,167	+4.2%
1890	1,150	−1.5%
1900	1,195	+3.9%
1910	1,186	−0.8%
1921	1,102	−7.1%
1930	1,040	−5.6%
1950	582	−44.0%
1961	567	−2.6%
1970	516	−9.0%
1980	442	−14.3%
1991	363	−17.9%
2001	403	+11.0%
2011	417	+3.5%
2021	449	+7.7%
Source: Censuses
