= Habartice (Liberec District) =

- Municipality
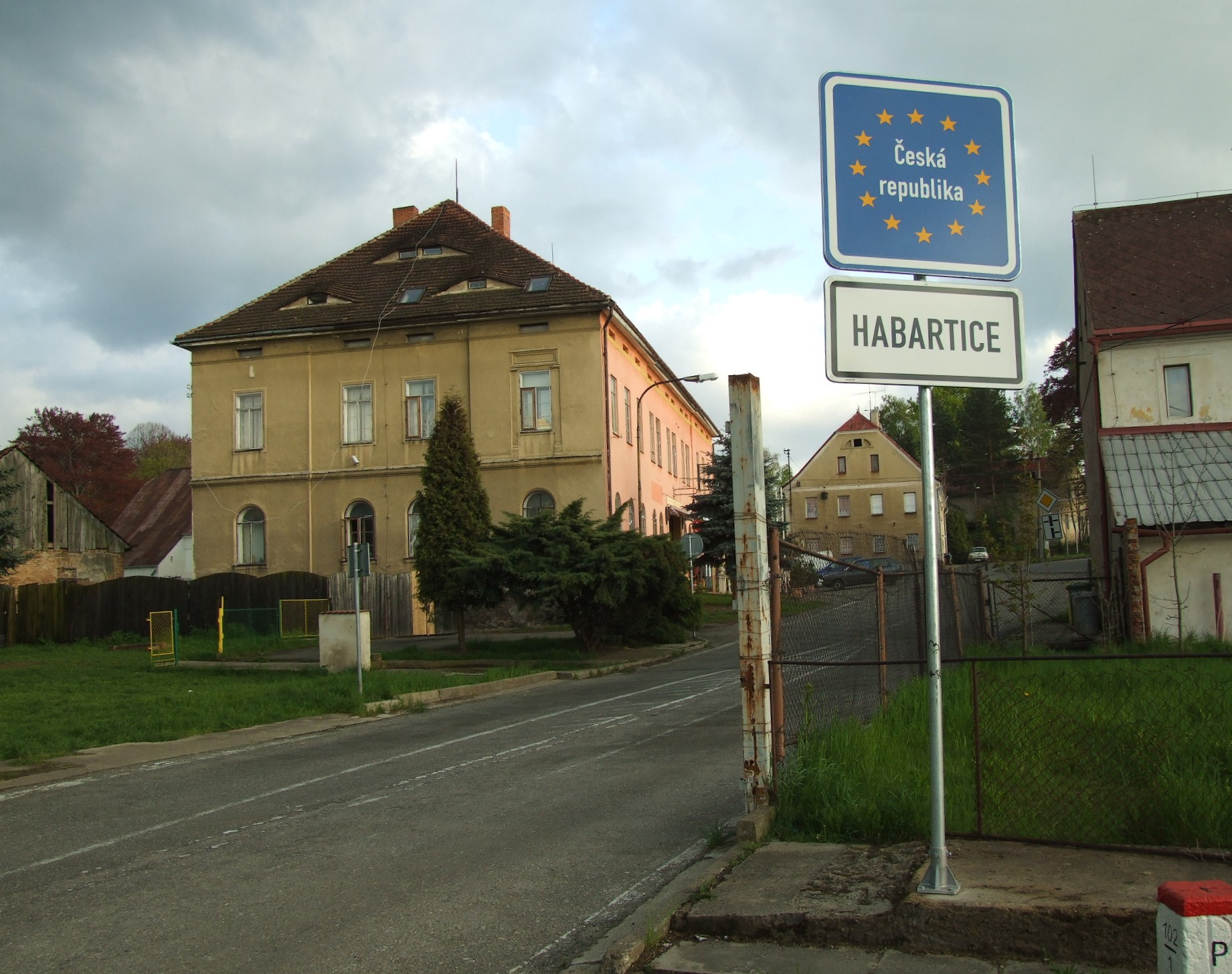
- Entrance to the village

- Flag Coat of arms

- Location in the Czech Republic
- Coordinates: 51°1′9″N 15°3′55″E
- Country: Czech Republic
- Region: Liberec
- District: Liberec
- First mentioned: 1399

Area
  - Total: 5.55 km^{2} (2.14 sq mi)
- Elevation: 237 m (778 ft)

Population (2026-01-01)
  - Total: 467
  - Density: 84.1/km^{2} (218/sq mi)
- Time zone: UTC+1 (CET)
  - Summer (DST): UTC+2 (CEST)
- Postal code: 463 73
- Website: obechabartice.cz

Habartice (German: Ebersdorf) is a municipality and village in Liberec District in the Liberec Region of the Czech Republic. It has about 500 inhabitants. It lies on the border with Poland, adjoining the town of Zawidów.

== Administrative division ==
Habartice consists of two municipal parts (in brackets population according to the 2021 census):

- Habartice (424)
- Háj (35)

== Demographics ==
Historical population
| Year | Pop. | ±% |
|---|---|---|
| 1869 | 846 | — |
| 1880 | 946 | +11.8% |
| 1890 | 1,306 | +38.1% |
| 1900 | 1,473 | +12.8% |
| 1910 | 1,459 | −1.0% |
| 1921 | 1,236 | −15.3% |
| 1930 | 1,176 | −4.9% |
| 1950 | 607 | −48.4% |
| 1961 | 588 | −3.1% |
| 1970 | 527 | −10.4% |
| 1980 | 471 | −10.6% |
| 1991 | 432 | −8.3% |
| 2001 | 464 | +7.4% |
| 2011 | 484 | +4.3% |
| 2021 | 459 | −5.2% |
Source: Censuses
