= Euroregion Neisse-Nisa-Nysa =

Euroregion in Central Europe

Euroregion Neisse-Nisa-Nysa is the first Euroregion created in Central and Eastern Europe, established in 1991. It covers mainly the Liberec Region of the Czech Republic, the state of Saxony in Germany and the Lower Silesian Voivodeship in Poland.

== History ==
The representatives of the three countries approved a Memorandum determining the next steps in the creation of the region at the "Tripoint Conference on 23–25 May 1991". In June 1991, a tripartite working group was created, which proposed a structure model which is the basis for the work to this day. The very founding of the Euroregion took place in Zittau on 21 December 1991. Since 2004, it has been headquartered in the most important city of the Euroregion, Liberec. The Euroregion is represented in all three countries – in Zittau in Germany, Jelenia Góra in Poland and Liberec in the Czech Republic (the chairman of the Euroregion is the governor of the Liberec Region).

== Objectives ==
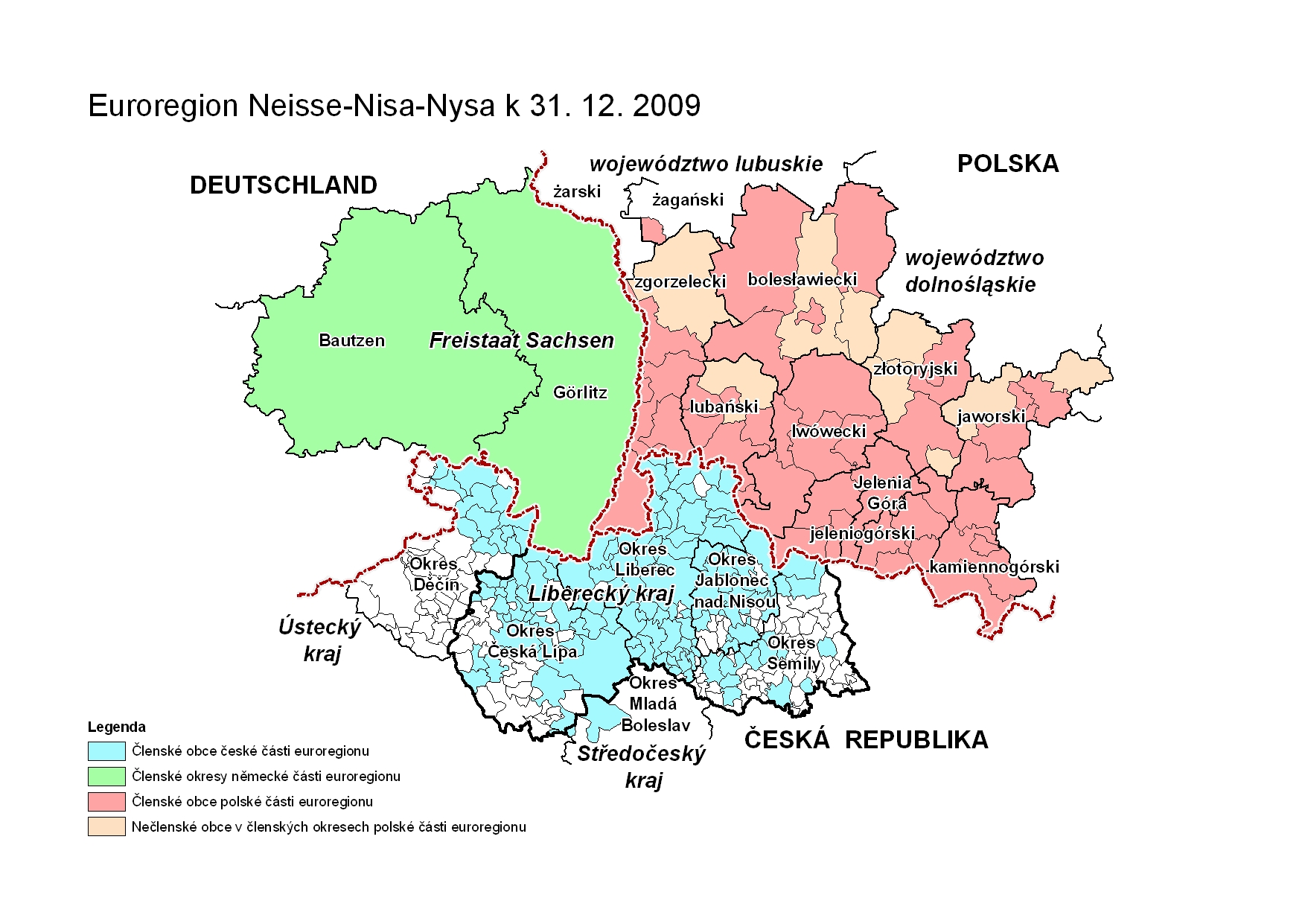
Member municipalities of the Euroregion

Euroregion is a voluntary interest association of municipalities and districts of the tripoint of the Czech Republic, Germany and Poland. It was founded to support the development of these areas in the form of mutual, cross-border cooperation. Its objectives are:

- elimination of the negative effects of the state border
- improving the standard of living of Euroregion residents
- improvement of natural and cultural-political conditions of life
- development of the economic potential of the Euroregion

== Statistical data ==
Statistics of the euroregion (as of 2020)
	Area (km^{2})	Population	Number of member entities
Czech part	2,493	431,155	130
German part	4,507	548,568	98
Polish part	4,737	514,919	51
Total	11,737	1,494,642	279

== Members of the euroregion ==
On the Czech side, the euroregion includes a larger part of the Liberec Region and the Šluknov Hook in the Děčín District of the Ústí nad Labem Region (a total of 26% of the area of the Euroregion), on the German side the south-eastern part of the Free State of Saxony (23%) and on the Polish side the south-western part of the Lower Silesian Voivodeship (51%).

Members of the euroregion are:

=== Czech Republic ===
- Liberec Region, Liberec Regional Chamber of Commerce
- Liberec District

Bílá, Bílý Kostel nad Nisou, Bílý Potok, Bulovka, Černousy, Český Dub, Cetenov, Chotyně, Chrastava, Čtveřín, Dětřichov, Frýdlant, Habartice, Hejnice, Heřmanice, Hlavice, Hodkovice nad Mohelkou, Horní Řasnice, Hrádek nad Nisou, Jablonné v Podještědí, Janův Důl, Jeřmanice, Jindřichovice pod Smrkem, Krásný Les, Křižany, Kryštofovo Údolí, Lázně Libverda, Liberec, Mníšek, Nová Ves, Nové Město pod Smrkem, Oldřichov v Hájích, Osečná, Paceřice, Pěnčín, Pertoltice, Příšovice, Radimovice, Raspenava, Rynoltice, Šimonovice, Soběslavice, Stráž nad Nisou, Světlá pod Ještědem, Svijanský Újezd, Višňová, Všelibice, Žďárek, Zdislava

- Česká Lípa District

Blíževedly, Brniště, Česká Lípa, Cvikov, Doksy, Dubnice, Hamr na Jezeře, Kamenický Šenov, Krompach, Kunratice u Cvikova, Mařenice, Mimoň, Noviny pod Ralskem, Nový Bor, Nový Oldřichov, Okrouhlá, Polevsko, Prysk, Radvanec, Ralsko, Skalice u České Lípy, Sloup v Čechách, Sosnová, Stráž pod Ralskem, Stvolínky, Svojkov, Svor, Velký Valtinov, Zákupy

- Jablonec nad Nisou District

Albrechtice v Jizerských horách, Bedřichov, Desná, Harrachov, Jablonec nad Nisou, Janov nad Nisou, Jiřetín pod Bukovou, Josefův Důl, Koberovy, Kořenov, Líšný, Lučany nad Nisou, Maršovice, Nová Ves nad Nisou, Pěnčín, Pulečný, Rádlo, Rychnov u Jablonce nad Nisou, Smržovka, Tanvald, Železný Brod, Zlatá Olešnice

- Semily District

Bělá, Benešov u Semil, Bozkov, Chuchelna, Hrubá Skála, Jilemnice, Karlovice, Lomnice nad Popelkou, Mírová pod Kozákovem, Paseky nad Jizerou, Rokytnice nad Jizerou, Semily, Turnov, Záhoří

- Děčín District

Chřibská, Dolní Podluží, Dolní Poustevna, Doubice, Horní Podluží, Jiřetín pod Jedlovou, Krásná Lípa, Lipová, Rumburk, Staré Křečany, Šluknov, Varnsdorf, Velký Šenov, Vilémov

=== Germany ===
- District of Bautzen (Landkreis Bautzen)
- District of Görlitz (Landkreis Görlitz)
- Marketinggesellschaft Oberlausitz-Niederschlesien mbH

=== Poland ===
- Bolesławiec County

Bolesławiec, Gmina Gromadka, Gmina Nowogrodziec, Gmina Osiecznica

- Jawor County

Gmina Bolków, Jawor, Gmina Mściwojów, Gmina Paszowice

- Jelenia Góra
- Karkonosze County

Gmina Janowice Wielkie, Gmina Jeżów Sudecki, Karpacz, Kowary, Gmina Mysłakowice, Piechowice, Gmina Podgórzyn, Gmina Stara Kamienica, Szklarska Poręba

- Kamienna Góra County

Kamienna Góra, Gmina Kamienna Góra, Lubawka, Gmina Marciszów

- Lubań County

Gmina Leśna, Lubań, Gmina Olszyna, Gmina Siekierczyn, Świeradów-Zdrój

- Lwówek County

Gmina Gryfów Śląski, Gmina Lubomierz, Gmina Lwówek Śląski, Gmina Mirsk, Gmina Wleń

- Zgorzelec County

Gmina Bogatynia, Gmina Pieńsk, Gmina Sulików, Gmina Węgliniec, Zawidów, Gmina Zgorzelec, Zgorzelec

- Złotoryja County

Gmina Świerzawa, Wojcieszów, Gmina Złotoryja, Złotoryja

- entities from other voivodeships than Lower Silesian Voivodeship

Gozdnica
