= Liberec-Jablonec agglomeration =

Area of the Czech Republic

Liberec-Jablonec agglomeration Liberecko-jablonecká aglomerace
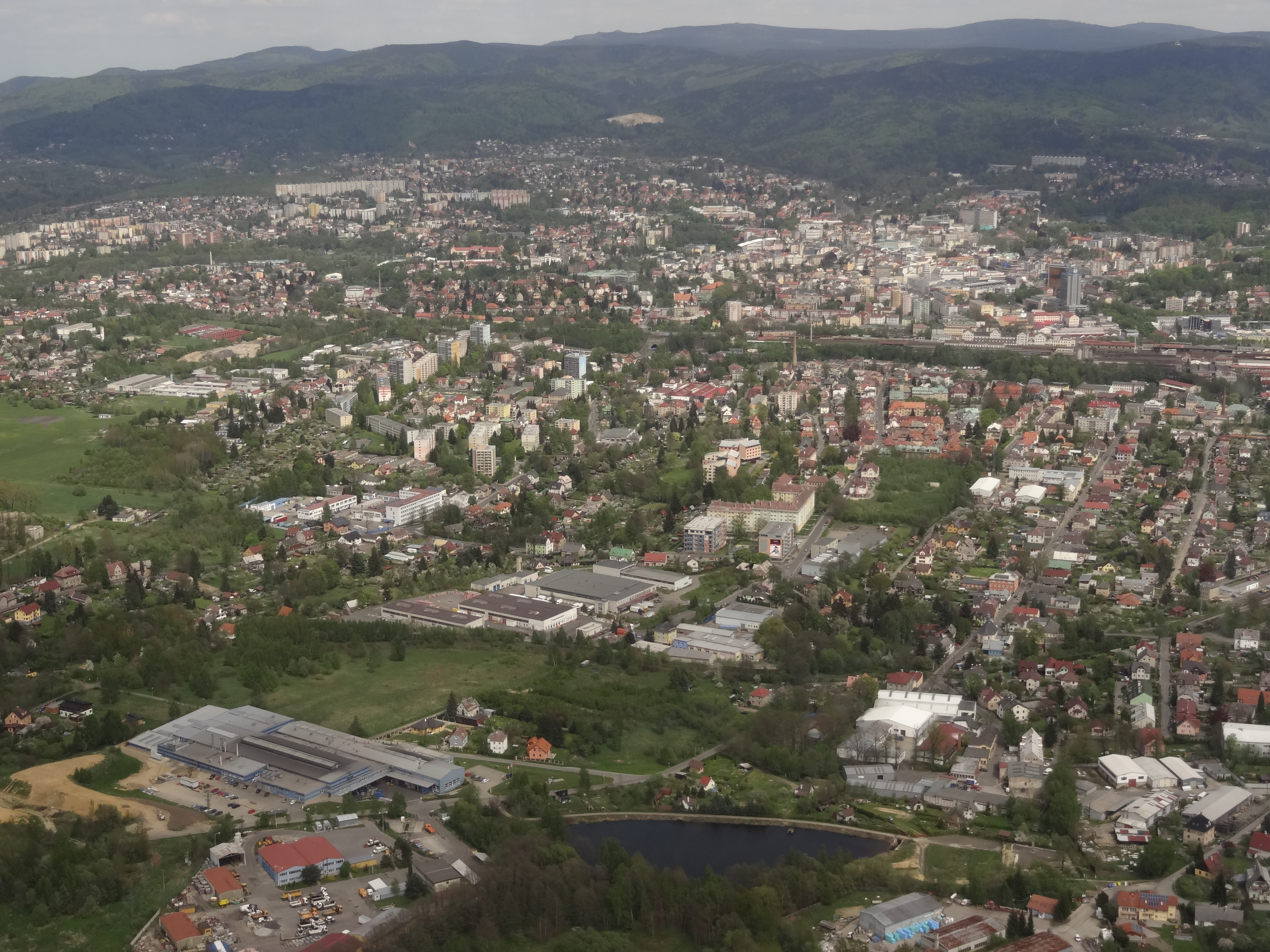
- View of Liberec
- Country: Czech Republic
- Region: Liberec
- Largest cities: Liberec, Jablonec nad Nisou

Area
  - Total: 808.2 km^{2} (312.0 sq mi)

Population (2024)
  - Total: 226,835
  - Density: 280.7/km^{2} (726.9/sq mi)
- Time zone: UTC+1 (CET)
  - Summer (DST): UTC+2 (CEST)

The Liberec-Jablonec agglomeration (Czech: Liberecko-jablonecká aglomerace) is the agglomeration of the cities of Liberec and Jablonec nad Nisou and their surroundings in the Liberec Region of the Czech Republic. It was defined in 2020 as a tool for drawing money from the European Structural and Investment Funds and is valid in 2021–2027. The agglomeration has a population of about 227,000.

== Definition ==
The Liberec-Jablonec agglomeration was defined in 2020 by the Ministry of Regional Development of the Czech Republic for the purposes of the so-called Integrated Territorial Investment (ITI), which is a tool for drawing money from the European Structural and Investment Funds.

The territory was defined on the basis of a coefficient composed of three methods: integrated system of centres (i.e. delineation of commuting flows based on mobile operator data from 2019), time spent in core cities (based on mobile operator data from 2019) and residential suburbanization zones (based on statistics of realized housing construction and directional migration from the core of the agglomeration to suburban municipalities in the period 2009–2016). The scope of the territory is valid for the period 2021–2027.

== Municipalities ==
The agglomeration includes 47 municipalities.

Name	Population (2024)
Albrechtice v Jizerských horách	367
Bedřichov	402
Bíla	965
Bílý Kostel nad Nisou	1,093
Černousy	312
Český Dub	2,923
Chotyně	1,070
Chrastava	6,340
Dalešice	222
Dětřichov	705
Dlouhý Most	996
Frýdlant	7,388
Hamr na Jezeře	478
Heřmanice	280
Hodkovice nad Mohelkou	3,002
Hrádek nad Nisou	7,932
Jablonec nad Nisou	46,226
Janov nad Nisou	1,509
Janovice v Podještědí	90
Janův Důl	179
Jeřmanice	656
Jiřetín pod Bukovou	458
Josefův Důl	930
Křižany	854
Kryštofovo Údolí	417
Liberec	107,982
Lučany nad Nisou	1,982
Maršovice	619
Mníšek	1,780
Nová Ves	929
Nová Ves nad Nisou	891
Oldřichov v Hájích	844
Osečná	1,199
Pěnčín	2,079
Proseč pod Ještědem	450
Pulečný	494
Rádlo	1,018
Rychnov u Jablonce nad Nisou	2,865
Rynoltice	851
Šimonovice	1,500
Skuhrov	628
Smržovka	3,881
Stráž nad Nisou	2,400
Světlá pod Ještědem	979
Tanvald	6,051
Višňová	1,350
Zdislava	269
Total	226,835
