= Jílové u Držkova =

- Municipality
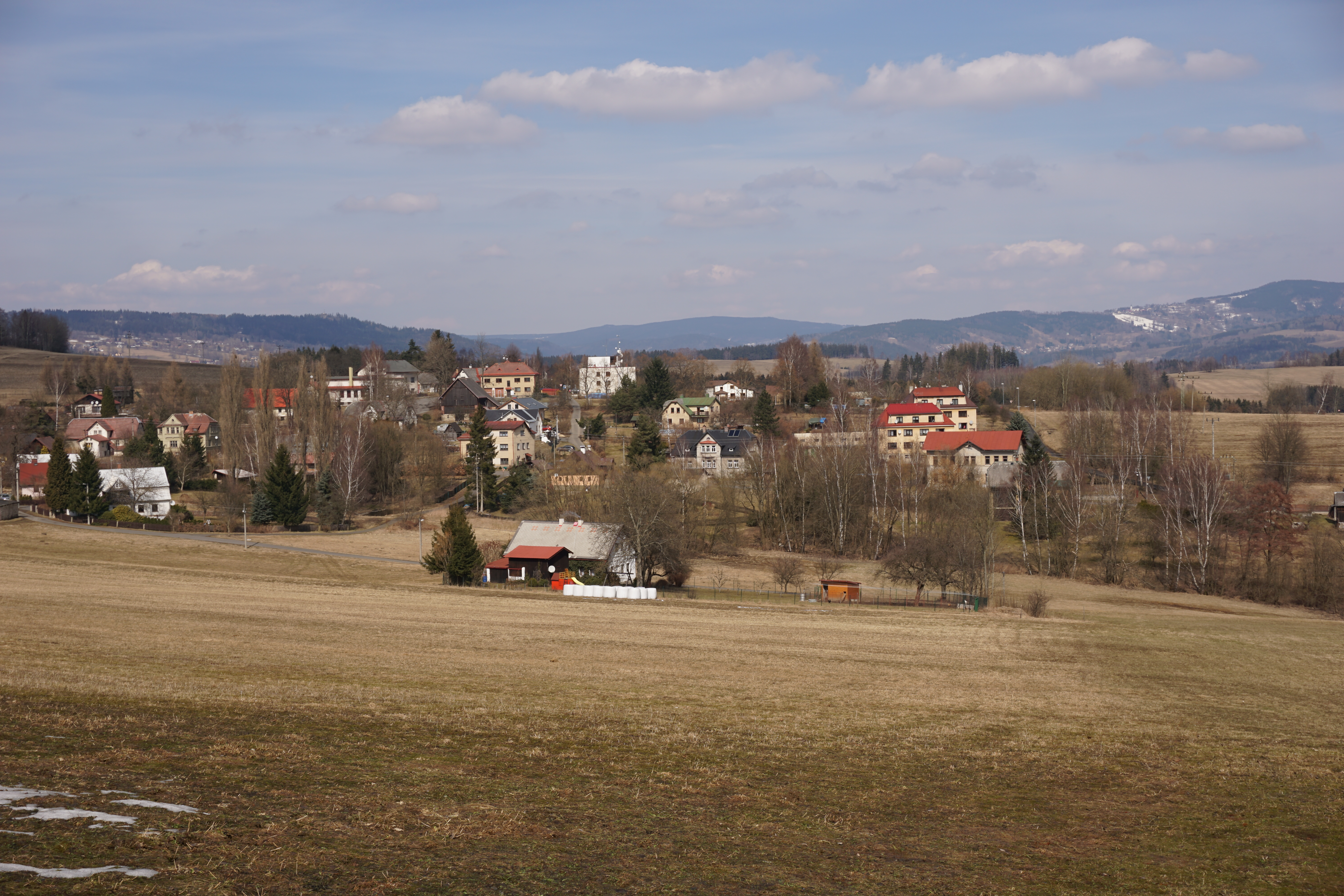
- View from the south

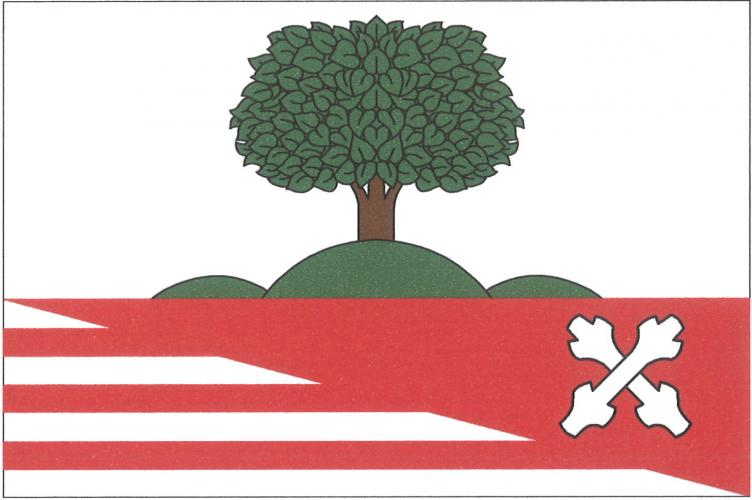
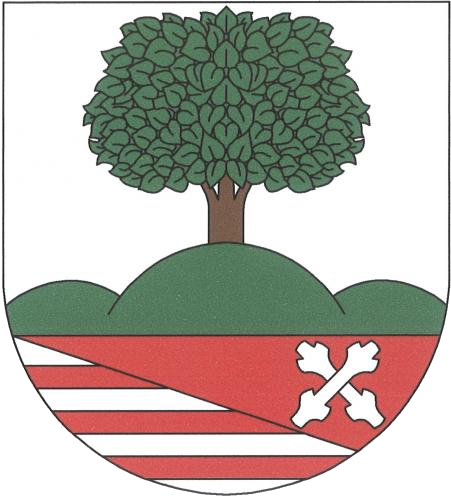
- Flag Coat of arms

- Location in the Czech Republic
- Coordinates: 50°40′15″N 15°17′43″E
- Country: Czech Republic
- Region: Liberec
- District: Jablonec nad Nisou
- First mentioned: 1627

Area
  - Total: 3.58 km^{2} (1.38 sq mi)
- Elevation: 520 m (1,710 ft)

Population (2026-01-01)
  - Total: 233
  - Density: 65.1/km^{2} (169/sq mi)
- Time zone: UTC+1 (CET)
  - Summer (DST): UTC+2 (CEST)
- Postal code: 468 24
- Website: www.jiloveudrzkova.cz

Jílové u Držkova (German: Jilau) is a municipality and village in Jablonec nad Nisou District in the Liberec Region of the Czech Republic. It has about 200 inhabitants.

== Demographics ==
Historical population
Year	Pop.	±%
1869	538	—
1880	587	+9.1%
1890	625	+6.5%
1900	679	+8.6%
1910	722	+6.3%
1921	585	−19.0%
1930	598	+2.2%
1950	392	−34.4%
1961	331	−15.6%
1970	268	−19.0%
1980	260	−3.0%
1991	232	−10.8%
2001	202	−12.9%
2011	203	+0.5%
2021	214	+5.4%
Source: Censuses
