= Loužnice =

- Municipality
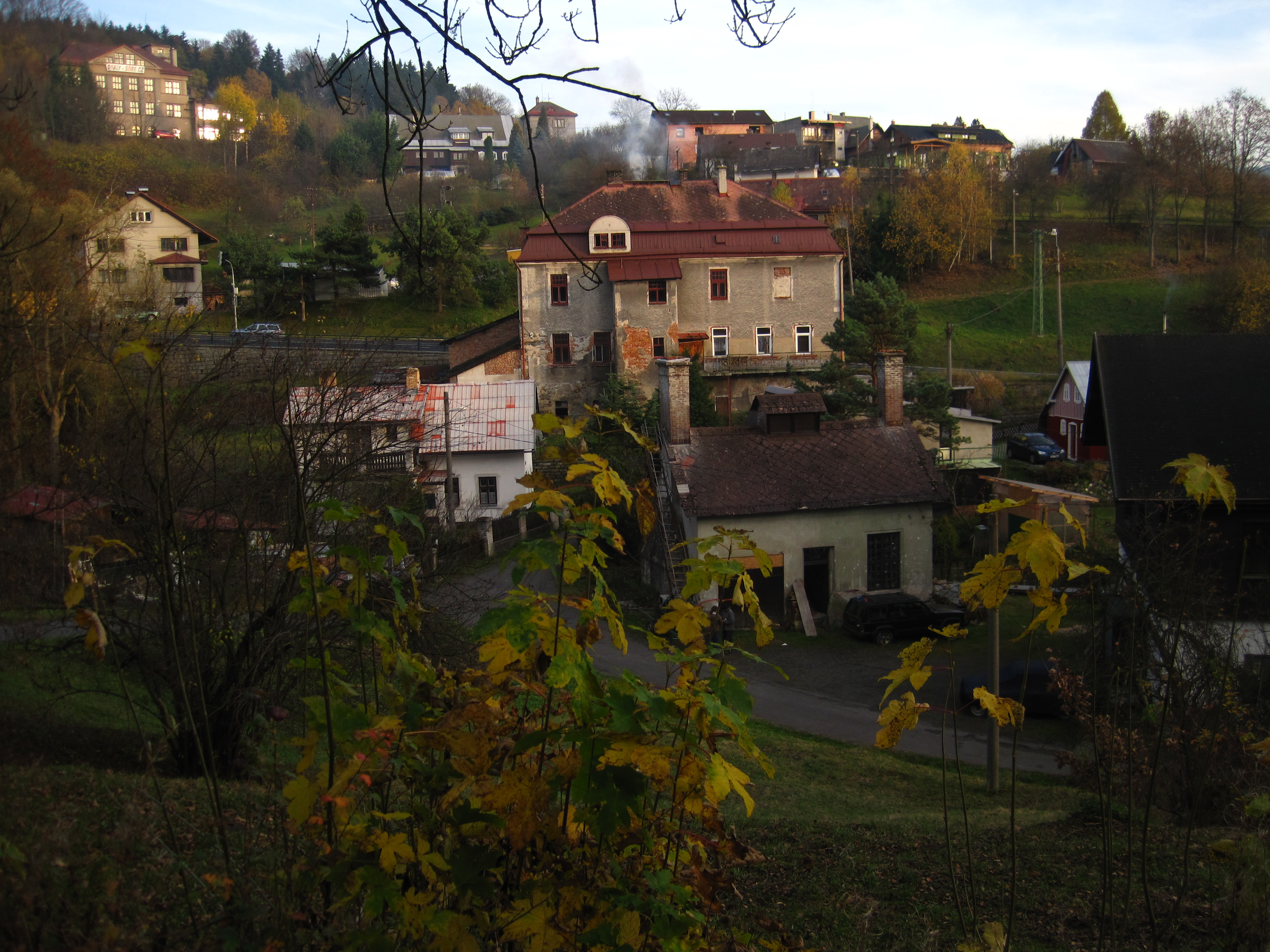
- Centre of Loužnice

- Location in the Czech Republic
- Coordinates: 50°40′47″N 15°16′4″E
- Country: Czech Republic
- Region: Liberec
- District: Jablonec nad Nisou
- First mentioned: 1624

Area
  - Total: 2.30 km^{2} (0.89 sq mi)
- Elevation: 568 m (1,864 ft)

Population (2026-01-01)
  - Total: 212
  - Density: 92.2/km^{2} (239/sq mi)
- Time zone: UTC+1 (CET)
  - Summer (DST): UTC+2 (CEST)
- Postal code: 468 22
- Website: www.louznice.com

Loužnice is a municipality and village in Jablonec nad Nisou District in the Liberec Region of the Czech Republic. It has about 200 inhabitants.

== Demographics ==
Historical population
Year	Pop.	±%
1869	328	—
1880	416	+26.8%
1890	444	+6.7%
1900	423	−4.7%
1910	449	+6.1%
1921	444	−1.1%
1930	437	−1.6%
1950	342	−21.7%
1961	323	−5.6%
1970	250	−22.6%
1980	217	−13.2%
1991	193	−11.1%
2001	199	+3.1%
2011	212	+6.5%
2021	220	+3.8%
Source: Censuses
