= Zásada =

- Market town
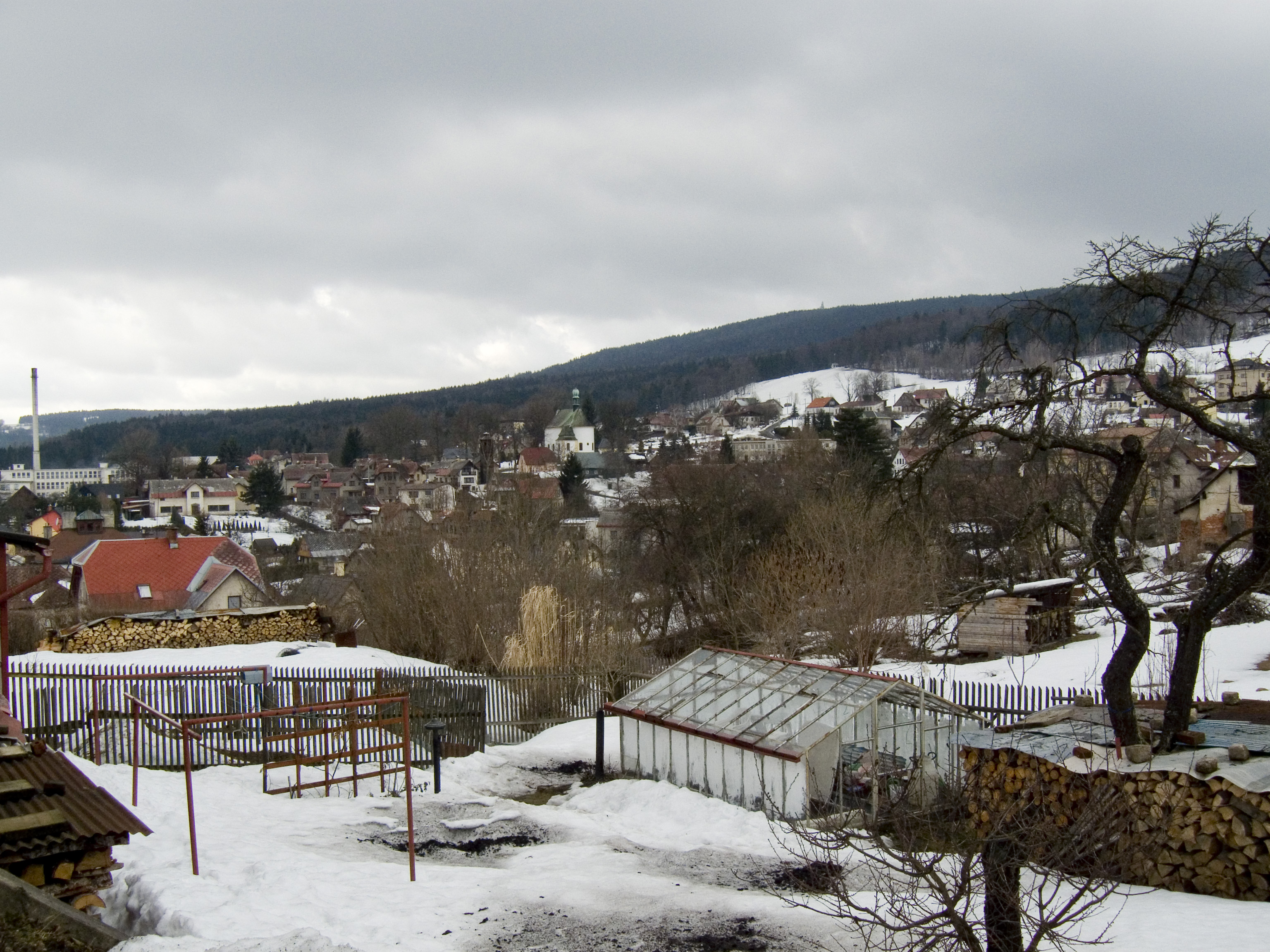
- View of Zásada

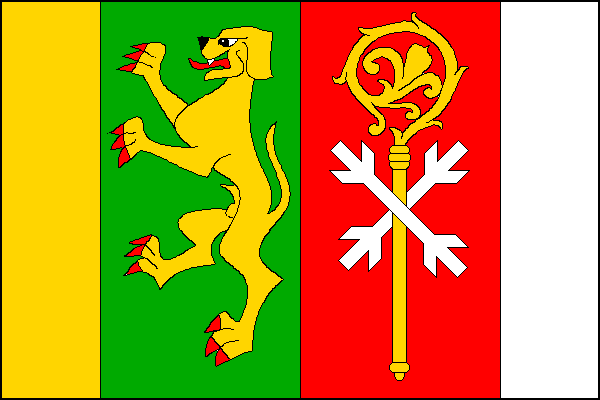
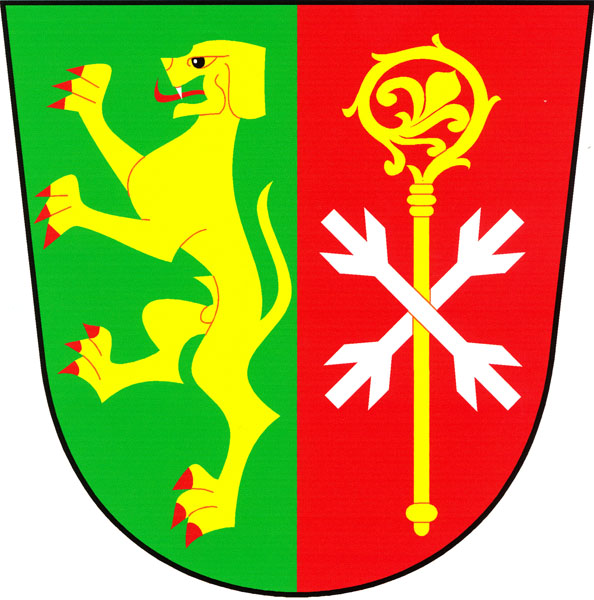
- Flag Coat of arms

- Location in the Czech Republic
- Coordinates: 50°41′52″N 15°16′12″E
- Country: Czech Republic
- Region: Liberec
- District: Jablonec nad Nisou
- First mentioned: 1356

Area
  - Total: 6.11 km^{2} (2.36 sq mi)
- Elevation: 520 m (1,710 ft)

Population (2026-01-01)
  - Total: 901
  - Density: 147/km^{2} (382/sq mi)
- Time zone: UTC+1 (CET)
  - Summer (DST): UTC+2 (CEST)
- Postal code: 468 25
- Website: www.zasada.cz

Zásada (Czech pronunciation: [ˈzaːsada]; German: Sassadel) is a market town in Jablonec nad Nisou District in the Liberec Region of the Czech Republic. It has about 900 inhabitants.

== Etymology ==
There are three theories about the origin of the name. Either the name was derived from the old Czech word zásada, which denoted a place where hunters lie in wait for game; or from the old Czech verb zasaditi se, which meant 'to settle down'; or from the old Czech expression zasaditi hranice, i.e. 'to mark boundaries'.

== Geography ==
Zásada is located about 7 kilometres (4 mi) east of Jablonec nad Nisou and 15 km (9 mi) east of Liberec. It lies on the border between the Jizera Mountains and Giant Mountains Foothills. The highest point is on the slope of the Pustina mountain at 769 m (2,523 ft) above sea level.

== History ==
The first written mention of Zásada is from 1356.

== Demographics ==
Historical population

Year	Pop.	±%
1869	942	—
1880	1,139	+20.9%
1890	1,268	+11.3%
1900	1,242	−2.1%
1910	1,481	+19.2%

Year	Pop.	±%
1921	1,372	−7.4%
1930	1,621	+18.1%
1950	1,167	−28.0%
1961	1,159	−0.7%
1970	1,028	−11.3%

Year	Pop.	±%
1980	1,022	−0.6%
1991	904	−11.5%
2001	841	−7.0%
2011	858	+2.0%
2021	872	+1.6%

Source: Censuses

== Transport ==
There are no railways or major roads passing through the municipality.

== Sights ==
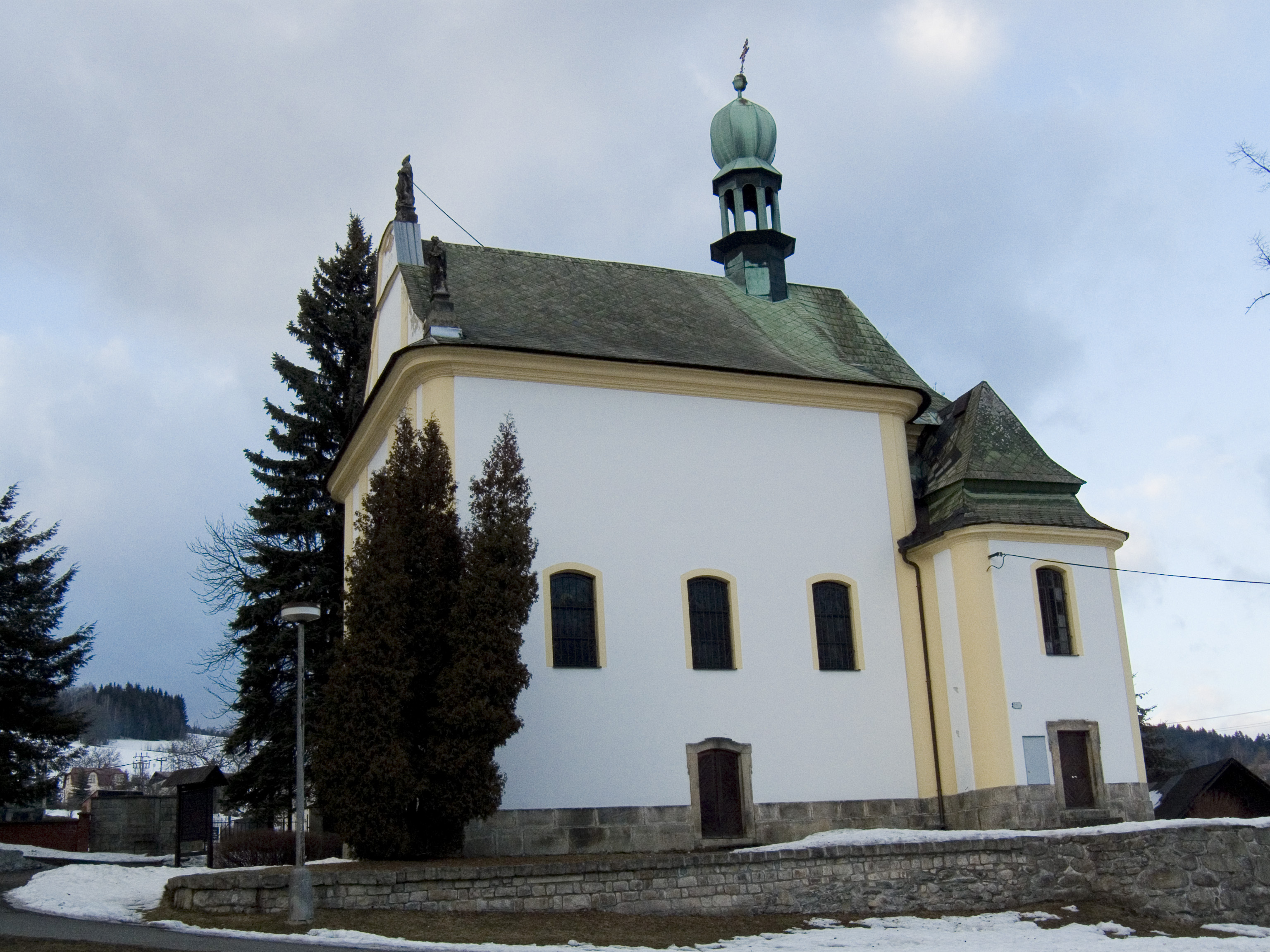
Chapel of Saint Procopius

The most important monument of Zásada is the Chapel of Saint Procopius. It is a large chapel, built in the Baroque style in 1747–1749.
