= Jenišovice =

Jenišovice may refer to places in the Czech Republic:

- Jenišovice (Chrudim District), a municipality and village in the Pardubice Region
- Jenišovice (Jablonec nad Nisou District), a municipality and village in the Liberec Region
- Jenišovice, a village and part of Býkev in the Central Bohemian Region
- Jenišovice, a village and part of Křivsoudov in the Central Bohemian Region
