= Dalešice (Jablonec nad Nisou District) =

- Municipality
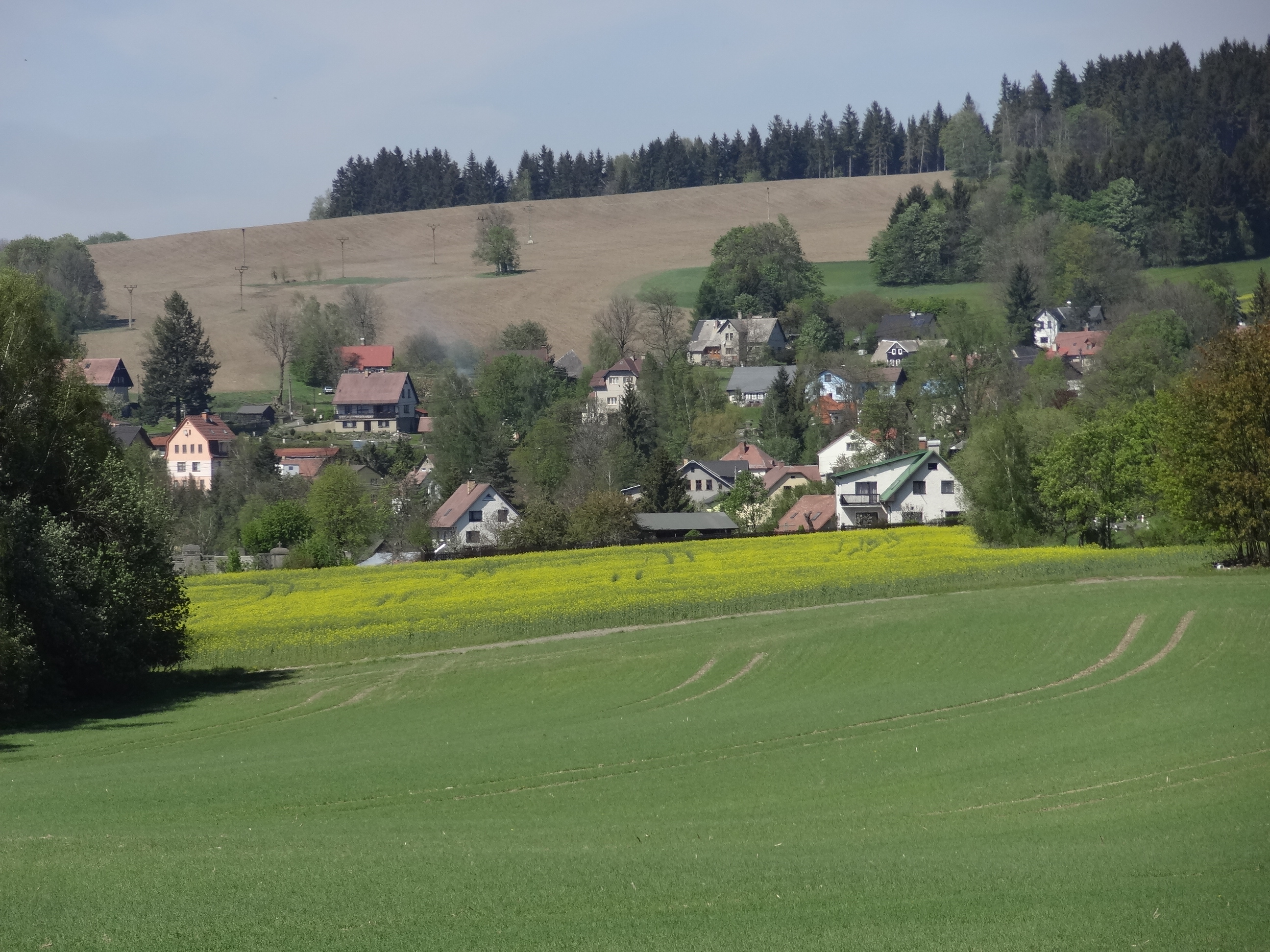
- View from the south

- Flag Coat of arms

- Location in the Czech Republic
- Coordinates: 50°40′55″N 15°11′5″E
- Country: Czech Republic
- Region: Liberec
- District: Jablonec nad Nisou
- First mentioned: 1538

Area
  - Total: 2.43 km^{2} (0.94 sq mi)
- Elevation: 568 m (1,864 ft)

Population (2026-01-01)
  - Total: 225
  - Density: 92.6/km^{2} (240/sq mi)
- Time zone: UTC+1 (CET)
  - Summer (DST): UTC+2 (CEST)
- Postal code: 468 02
- Website: www.oudalesice.cz

Dalešice (German: Daleschitz) is a municipality and village in Jablonec nad Nisou District in the Liberec Region of the Czech Republic. It has about 200 inhabitants.

== History ==
The first written mention of Dalešice is from 1538. Until 1848, the village was part of the Český Dub estate. In 1960, the municipality was merged with Maršovice. In 1991, Dalešice became again an independent municipality.

== Demographics ==
Historical population
Year	Pop.	±%
1869	324	—
1880	313	−3.4%
1890	326	+4.2%
1900	310	−4.9%
1910	328	+5.8%
1921	327	−0.3%
1930	410	+25.4%
1950	211	−48.5%
1961	221	+4.7%
1970	163	−26.2%
1980	146	−10.4%
1991	116	−20.5%
2001	114	−1.7%
2011	176	+54.4%
2021	208	+18.2%
Source: Censuses
