= Vlastiboř =

Vlastiboř may refer to places in the Czech Republic:

- Vlastiboř (Jablonec nad Nisou District), a municipality and village in the Liberec Region
- Vlastiboř (Tábor District), a municipality and village in the South Bohemian Region
