= Koberovy =

- Municipality
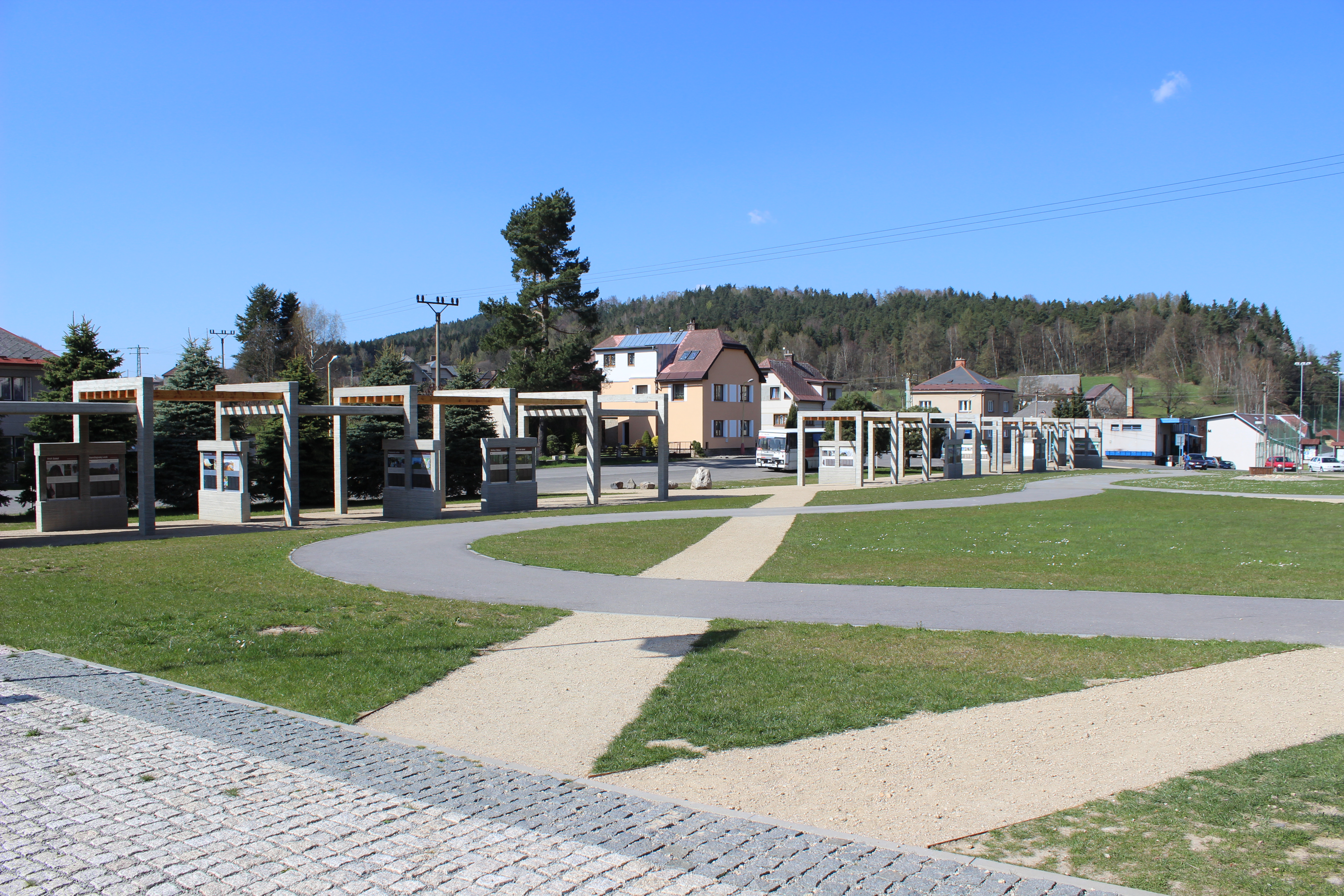
- Centre of Koberovy

- Flag Coat of arms

- Location in the Czech Republic
- Coordinates: 50°37′29″N 15°13′42″E
- Country: Czech Republic
- Region: Liberec
- District: Jablonec nad Nisou
- First mentioned: 1190

Area
  - Total: 8.75 km^{2} (3.38 sq mi)
- Elevation: 407 m (1,335 ft)

Population (2026-01-01)
  - Total: 998
  - Density: 114/km^{2} (295/sq mi)
- Time zone: UTC+1 (CET)
  - Summer (DST): UTC+2 (CEST)
- Postal code: 468 22
- Website: www.koberovy.cz

Koberovy (German: Koberwald) is a municipality and village in Jablonec nad Nisou District in the Liberec Region of the Czech Republic. It has about 1,000 inhabitants.

== Administrative division ==
Koberovy consists of eight municipal parts (in brackets population according to the 2021 census):

- Koberovy (555)
- Besedice (94)
- Chloudov (35)
- Hamštejn (37)
- Michovka (98)
- Prosíčka (12)
- Vrát (101)
- Zbirohy (34)

== History ==
The first written mention of Koberovy is from 1190.

== Demographics ==
Historical population
Year	Pop.	±%
1869	1,191	—
1880	1,231	+3.4%
1890	1,194	−3.0%
1900	1,265	+5.9%
1910	1,302	+2.9%
1921	1,272	−2.3%
1930	1,512	+18.9%
1950	1,076	−28.8%
1961	1,071	−0.5%
1970	1,066	−0.5%
1980	1,032	−3.2%
1991	919	−10.9%
2001	952	+3.6%
2011	970	+1.9%
2021	966	−0.4%
Source: Censuses
