= Jenišovice (Jablonec nad Nisou District) =

- Municipality
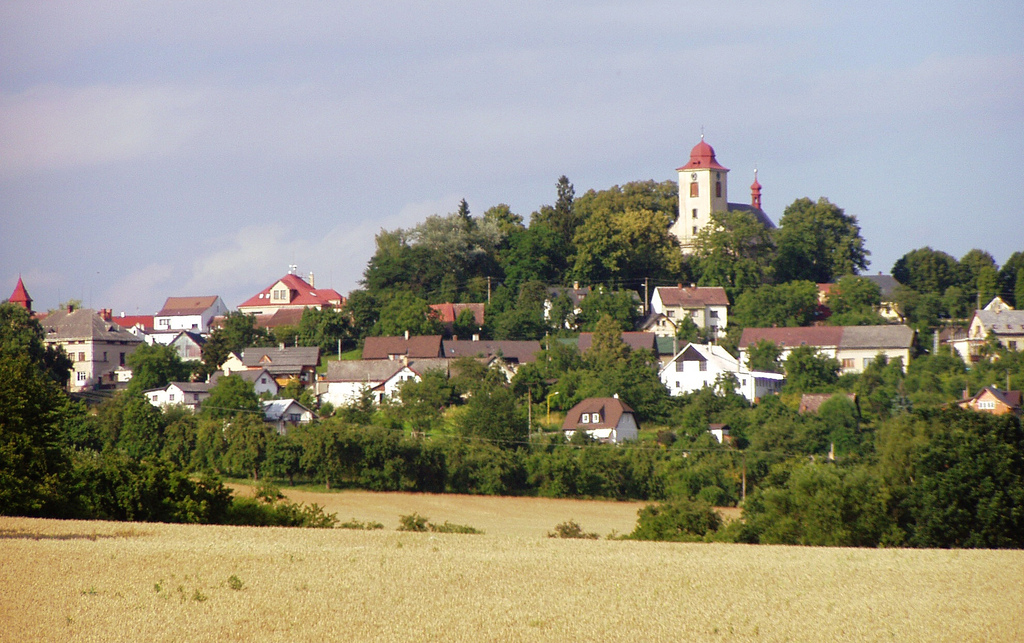
- Panorama of Jenišovice

- Flag Coat of arms

- Location in the Czech Republic
- Coordinates: 50°37′40″N 15°8′12″E
- Country: Czech Republic
- Region: Liberec
- District: Jablonec nad Nisou
- First mentioned: 1143

Area
  - Total: 7.42 km^{2} (2.86 sq mi)
- Elevation: 390 m (1,280 ft)

Population (2026-01-01)
  - Total: 1,306
  - Density: 176/km^{2} (456/sq mi)
- Time zone: UTC+1 (CET)
  - Summer (DST): UTC+2 (CEST)
- Postal code: 468 33
- Website: www.jenisovice.cz

Jenišovice (German: Jenschowitz) is a municipality and village in Jablonec nad Nisou District in the Liberec Region of the Czech Republic. It has about 1,300 inhabitants.

== Administrative division ==
Jenišovice consists of two municipal parts (in brackets population according to the 2021 census):

- Jenišovice (981)
- Odolenovice (232)

== History ==
The first written mention of Jenišovice is from 1143.

== Demographics ==
Historical population
| Year | Pop. | ±% |
|---|---|---|
| 1869 | 1,099 | — |
| 1880 | 1,110 | +1.0% |
| 1890 | 1,178 | +6.1% |
| 1900 | 1,217 | +3.3% |
| 1910 | 1,227 | +0.8% |
| 1921 | 1,130 | −7.9% |
| 1930 | 1,263 | +11.8% |
| 1950 | 841 | −33.4% |
| 1961 | 874 | +3.9% |
| 1970 | 826 | −5.5% |
| 1980 | 766 | −7.3% |
| 1991 | 782 | +2.1% |
| 2001 | 816 | +4.3% |
| 2011 | 973 | +19.2% |
| 2021 | 1,213 | +24.7% |
Source: Censuses
