= Vlastiboř (Jablonec nad Nisou District) =

- Municipality
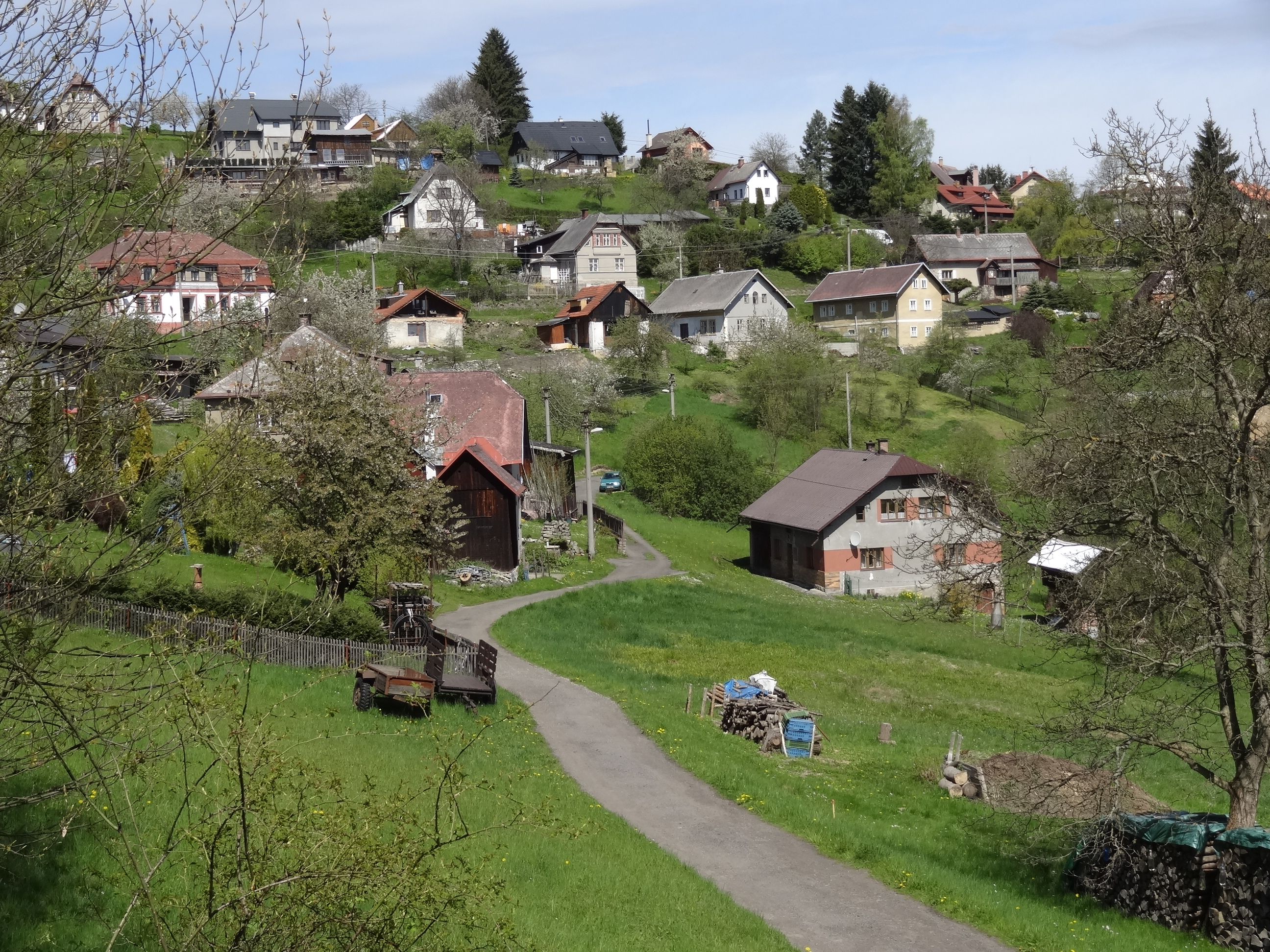
- View from the south

- Location in the Czech Republic
- Coordinates: 50°39′54″N 15°18′43″E
- Country: Czech Republic
- Region: Liberec
- District: Jablonec nad Nisou
- First mentioned: 1627

Area
  - Total: 3.62 km^{2} (1.40 sq mi)
- Elevation: 680 m (2,230 ft)

Population (2026-01-01)
  - Total: 142
  - Density: 39.2/km^{2} (102/sq mi)
- Time zone: UTC+1 (CET)
  - Summer (DST): UTC+2 (CEST)
- Postal code: 468 22
- Website: www.obec-vlastibor.cz

Vlastiboř is a municipality and village in Jablonec nad Nisou District in the Liberec Region of the Czech Republic. It has about 100 inhabitants.

== Demographics ==
Historical population
Year	Pop.	±%
1869	528	—
1880	658	+24.6%
1890	571	−13.2%
1900	578	+1.2%
1910	618	+6.9%
1921	535	−13.4%
1930	518	−3.2%
1950	324	−37.5%
1961	295	−9.0%
1970	252	−14.6%
1980	187	−25.8%
1991	134	−28.3%
2001	125	−6.7%
2011	131	+4.8%
2021	113	−13.7%
Source: Censuses

== Notable people ==
- Jiří Malec (born 1962), ski jumper, Olympic medalist
