= Líšný =

- Municipality
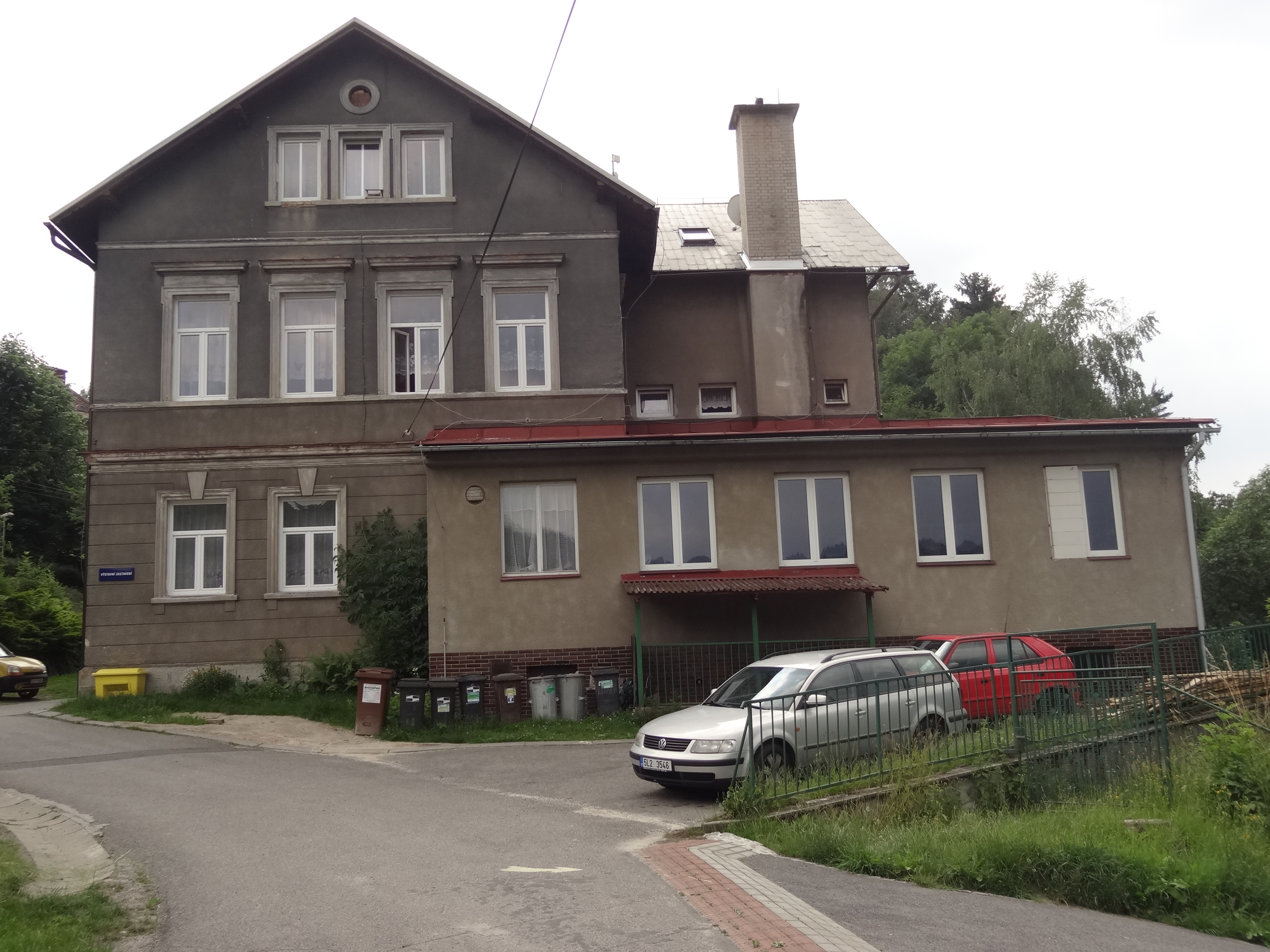
- Municipal office

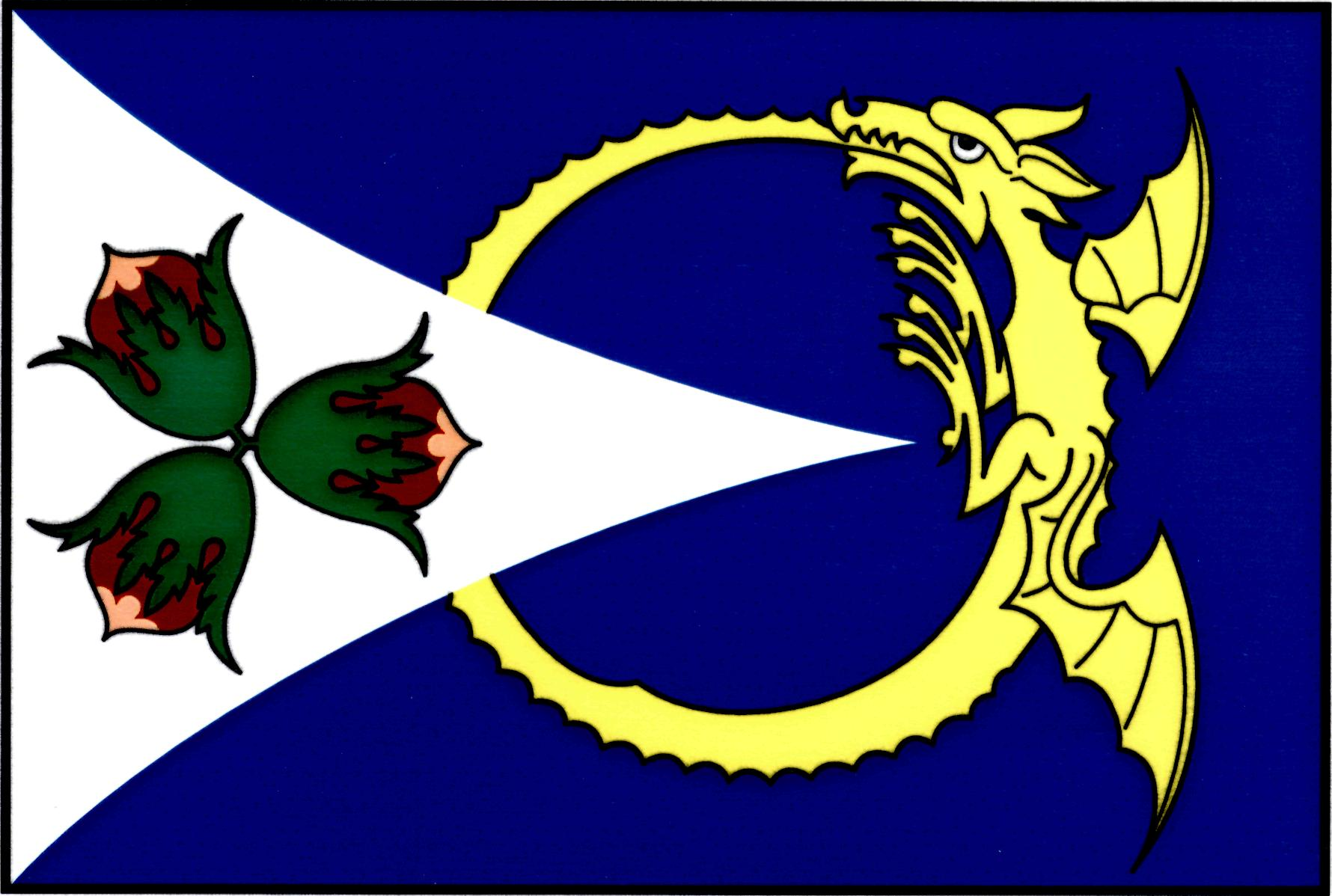
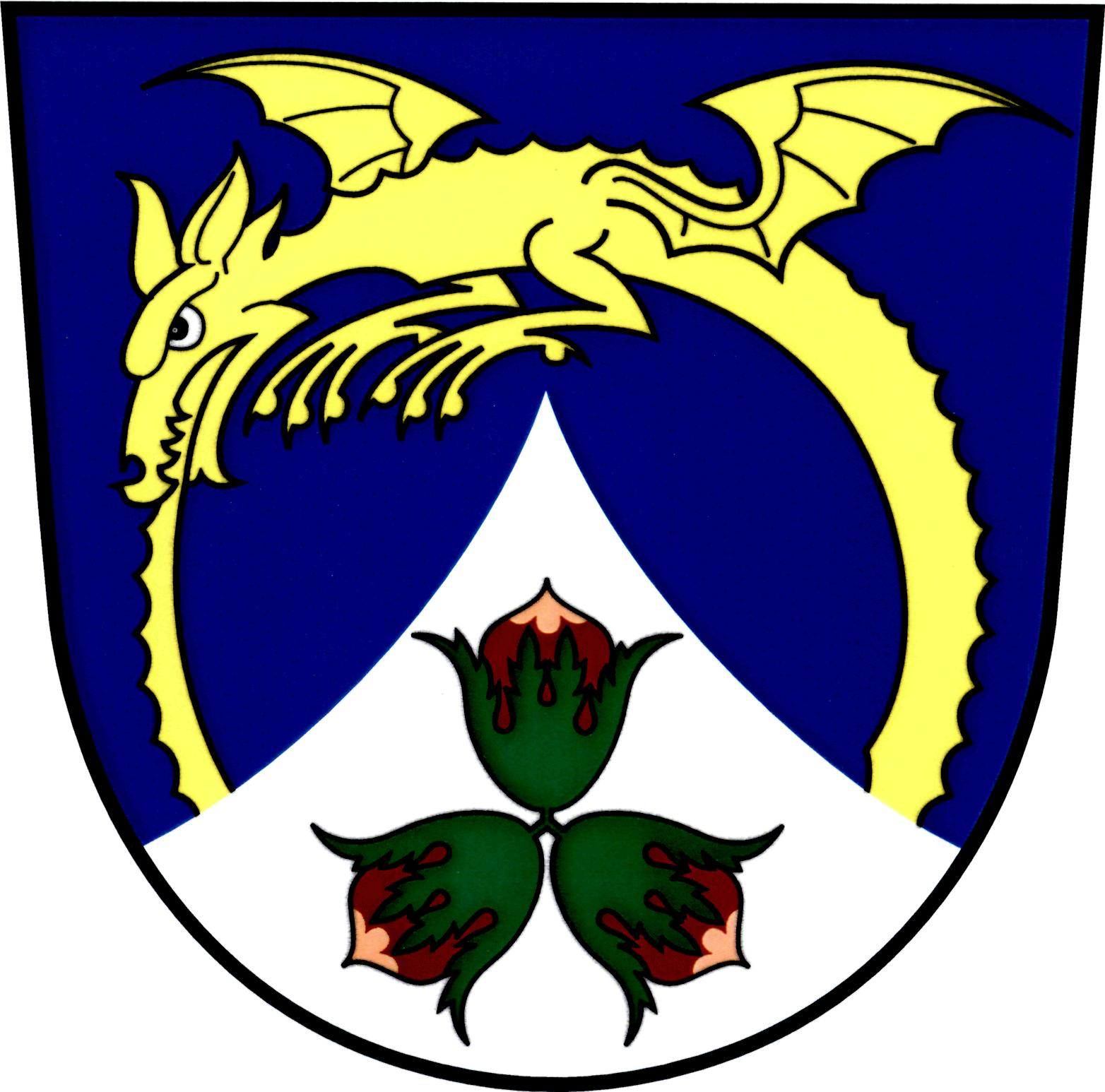
- Flag Coat of arms

- Location in the Czech Republic
- Coordinates: 50°38′49″N 15°12′46″E
- Country: Czech Republic
- Region: Liberec
- District: Jablonec nad Nisou
- First mentioned: 1382

Area
  - Total: 1.73 km^{2} (0.67 sq mi)
- Elevation: 525 m (1,722 ft)

Population (2026-01-01)
  - Total: 262
  - Density: 151/km^{2} (392/sq mi)
- Time zone: UTC+1 (CET)
  - Summer (DST): UTC+2 (CEST)
- Postal code: 468 22
- Website: www.lisny.cz

Líšný is a municipality and village in Jablonec nad Nisou District in the Liberec Region of the Czech Republic. It has about 300 inhabitants.

== Administrative division ==
Líšný consists of three municipal parts (in brackets population according to the 2021 census):

- Líšný 1.díl (36)
- Líšný 2.díl (218)
- Libentiny (8)

== Demographics ==
Historical population
Year	Pop.	±%
1869	316	—
1880	435	+37.7%
1890	521	+19.8%
1900	467	−10.4%
1910	613	+31.3%
1921	587	−4.2%
1930	705	+20.1%
1950	503	−28.7%
1961	455	−9.5%
1970	418	−8.1%
1980	324	−22.5%
1991	243	−25.0%
2001	244	+0.4%
2011	267	+9.4%
2021	262	−1.9%
Source: Censuses
