= Janov nad Nisou =

- Municipality
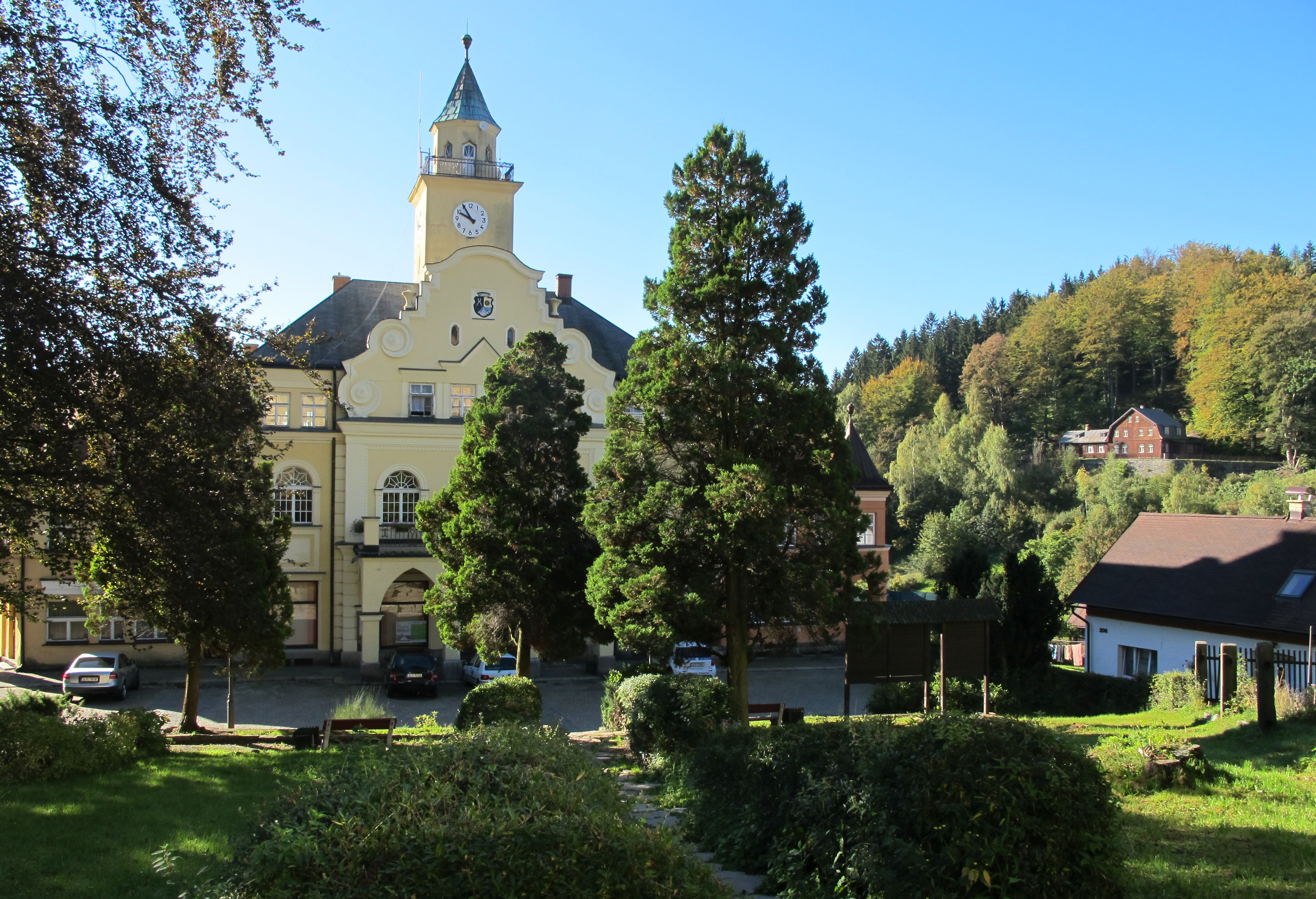
- Municipal office

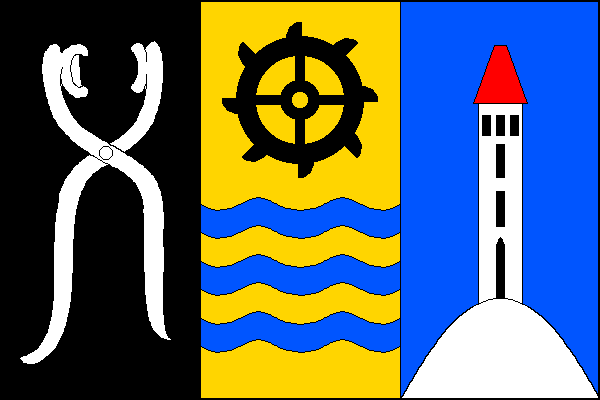
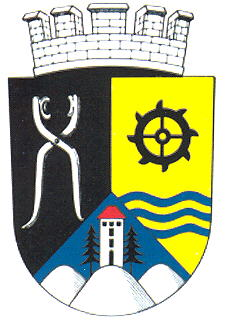
- Flag Coat of arms

- Location in the Czech Republic
- Coordinates: 50°46′20″N 15°10′9″E
- Country: Czech Republic
- Region: Liberec
- District: Jablonec nad Nisou
- First mentioned: 1645

Area
  - Total: 14.72 km^{2} (5.68 sq mi)
- Elevation: 560 m (1,840 ft)

Population (2026-01-01)
  - Total: 1,488
  - Density: 101.1/km^{2} (261.8/sq mi)
- Time zone: UTC+1 (CET)
  - Summer (DST): UTC+2 (CEST)
- Postal code: 468 11
- Website: www.janov-n-n.cz

Janov nad Nisou (until 1947 Honsberk; German: Johannesberg) is a municipality and village in Jablonec nad Nisou District in the Liberec Region of the Czech Republic. It has about 1,500 inhabitants.

== Administrative division ==
Janov nad Nisou consists of four municipal parts (in brackets population according to the 2021 census):

- Janov nad Nisou (631)
- Hrabětice (36)
- Hraničná (506)
- Loučná nad Nisou (255)

== Demographics ==
Historical population
Year	Pop.	±%
1869	3,967	—
1880	3,713	−6.4%
1890	4,135	+11.4%
1900	4,400	+6.4%
1910	4,664	+6.0%
1921	4,045	−13.3%
1930	4,236	+4.7%
1950	1,857	−56.2%
1961	1,780	−4.1%
1970	1,542	−13.4%
1980	1,321	−14.3%
1991	1,012	−23.4%
2001	1,143	+12.9%
2011	1,377	+20.5%
2021	1,428	+3.7%
Source: Censuses

== Notable people ==
- Markéta Davidová (born 1997), biathlete; lives here
