= Rádlo =

- Municipality
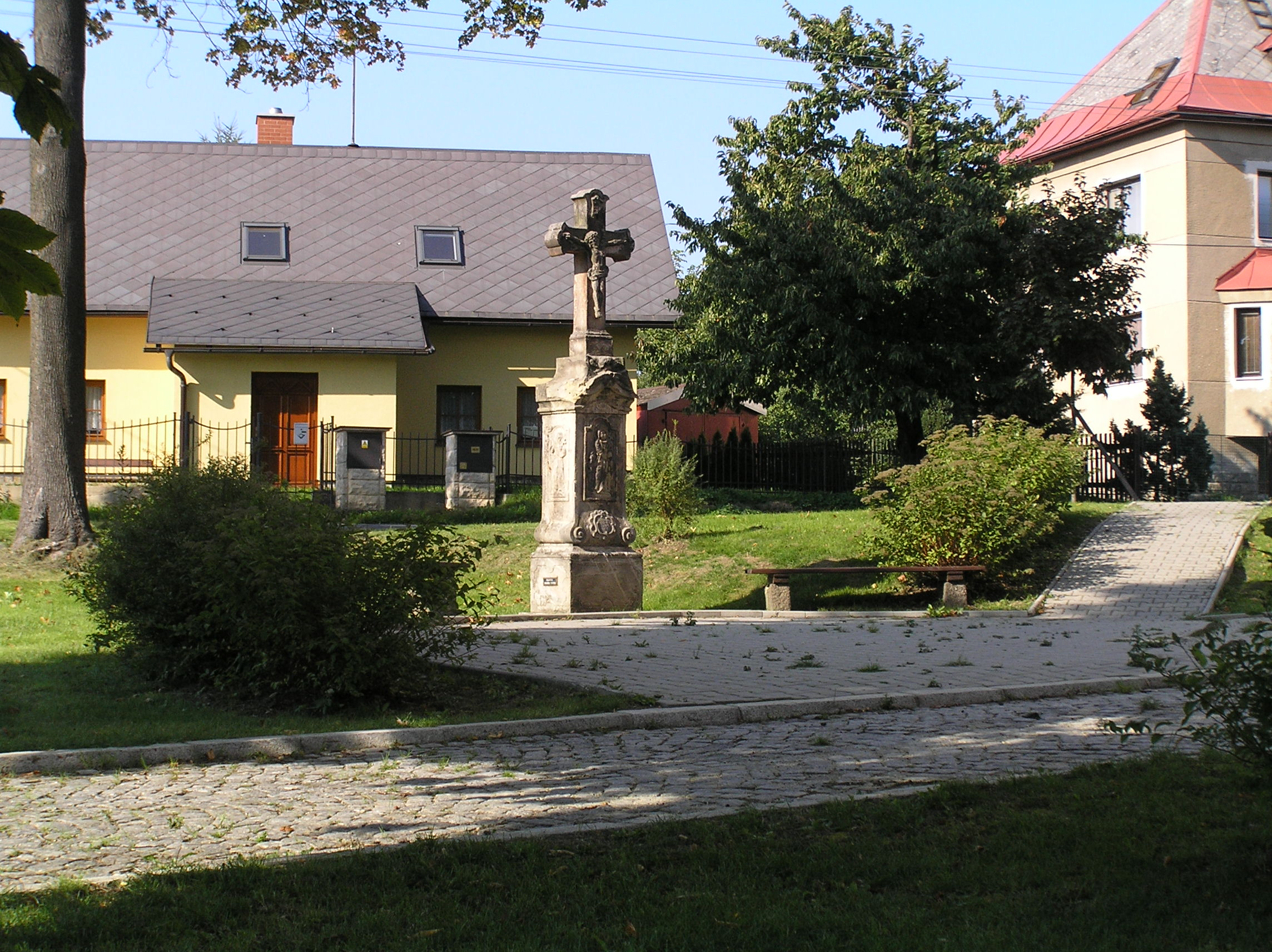
- Cross next to the church

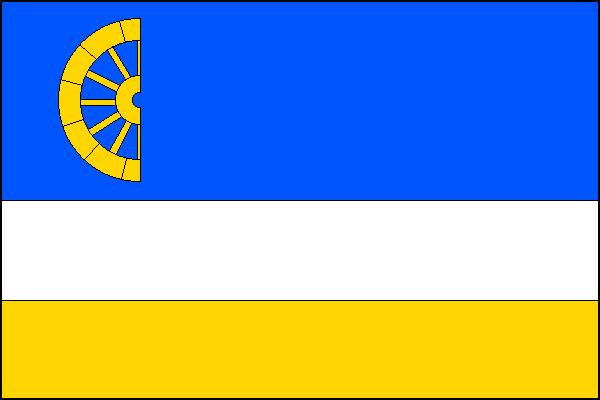
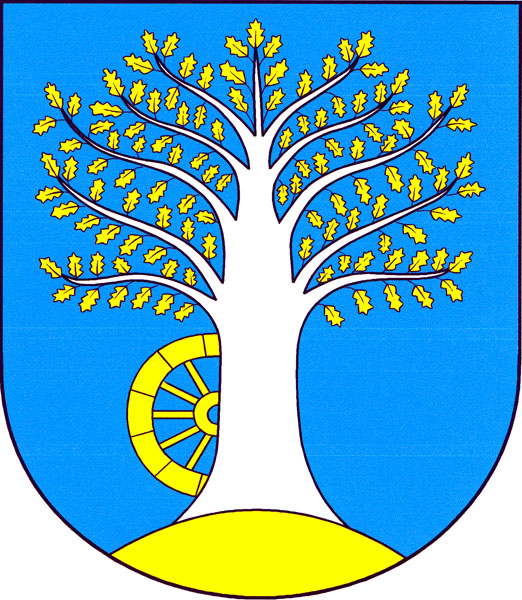
- Flag Coat of arms

- Location in the Czech Republic
- Coordinates: 50°41′55″N 15°6′57″E
- Country: Czech Republic
- Region: Liberec
- District: Jablonec nad Nisou
- First mentioned: 1454

Area
  - Total: 9.65 km^{2} (3.73 sq mi)
- Elevation: 536 m (1,759 ft)

Population (2026-01-01)
  - Total: 1,039
  - Density: 108/km^{2} (279/sq mi)
- Time zone: UTC+1 (CET)
  - Summer (DST): UTC+2 (CEST)
- Postal code: 468 03
- Website: www.radlo.cz

Rádlo (German: Radl) is a municipality and village in Jablonec nad Nisou District in the Liberec Region of the Czech Republic. It has about 1,000 inhabitants.

== Administrative division ==
Rádlo consists of two municipal parts (in brackets population according to the 2021 census):

- Rádlo (877)
- Milíře (55)

== Demographics ==
Historical population
| Year | Pop. | ±% |
|---|---|---|
| 1869 | 1,723 | — |
| 1880 | 1,656 | −3.9% |
| 1890 | 1,710 | +3.3% |
| 1900 | 1,916 | +12.0% |
| 1910 | 1,855 | −3.2% |
| 1921 | 1,631 | −12.1% |
| 1930 | 1,618 | −0.8% |
| 1950 | 894 | −44.7% |
| 1961 | 769 | −14.0% |
| 1970 | 673 | −12.5% |
| 1980 | 552 | −18.0% |
| 1991 | 467 | −15.4% |
| 2001 | 553 | +18.4% |
| 2011 | 710 | +28.4% |
| 2021 | 932 | +31.3% |
Source: Censuses
