= Jablonec nad Nisou District =

Jablonec nad Nisou District Okres Jablonec nad Nisou
- District
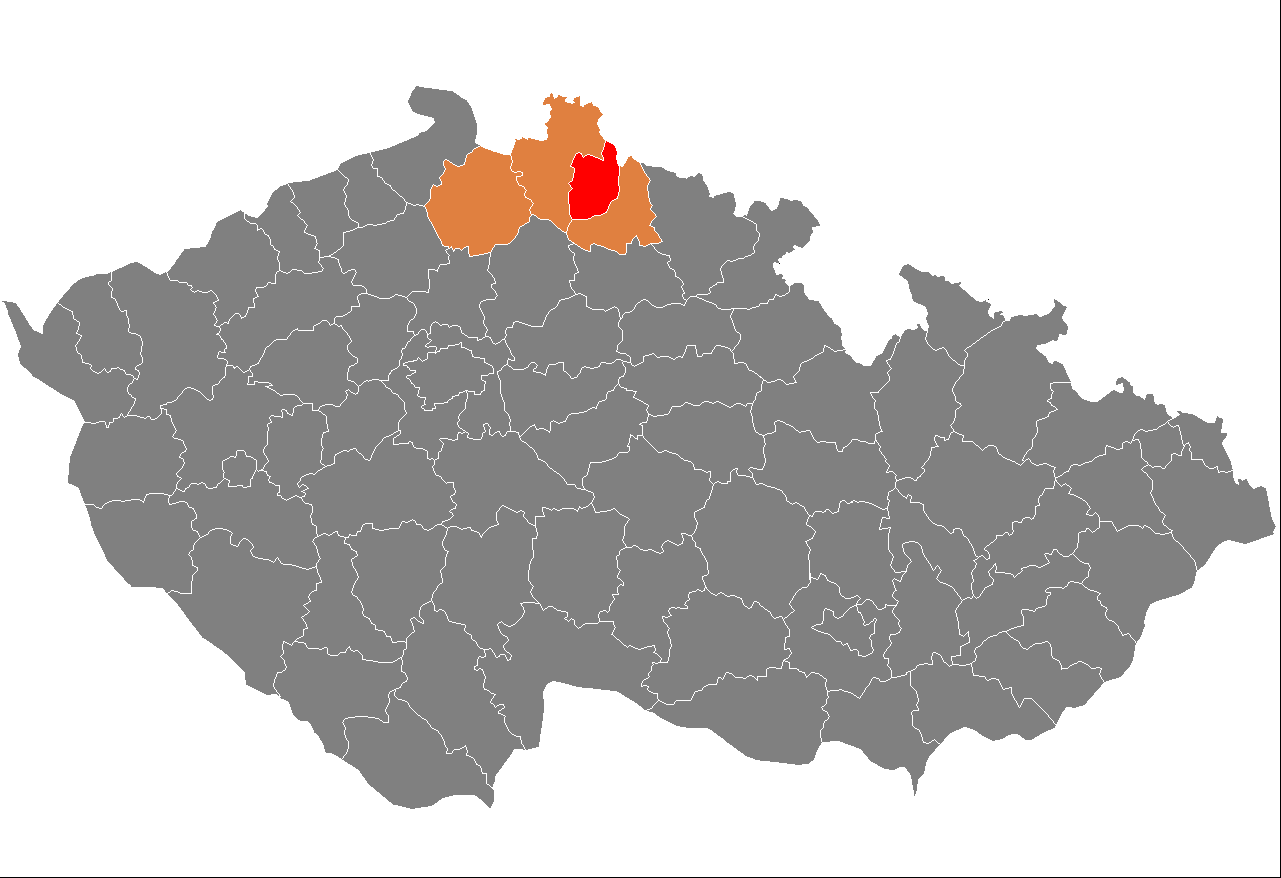
- Location in the Liberec Region within the Czech Republic
- Coordinates: 50°44′N 15°15′E
- Country: Czech Republic
- Region: Liberec
- Capital: Jablonec nad Nisou

Area
  - Total: 438.89 km^{2} (169.46 sq mi)

Population (2026)
  - Total: 92,836
  - Density: 211.52/km^{2} (547.85/sq mi)
- Time zone: UTC+1 (CET)
  - Summer (DST): UTC+2 (CEST)
- Municipalities: 35
- * Cities and towns: 9
- * Market towns: 1

Jablonec nad Nisou District (Czech: okres Jablonec nad Nisou) is a district in the Liberec Region of the Czech Republic. Its capital is the city of Jablonec nad Nisou.

== Administrative division ==
Jablonec nad Nisou District is divided into three administrative districts of municipalities with extended competence: Jablonec nad Nisou, Tanvald and Železný Brod. In addition, two municipalities (Jenišovice and Malá Skála) belong to the administrative district of Turnov, which is the only such administrative district in the country whose borders do not correspond to the borders of the district.

=== List of municipalities ===
Cities and towns are marked in bold and market towns in italics:

Albrechtice v Jizerských horách – Bedřichov – Dalešice – Desná – Držkov – Frýdštejn – Harrachov – Jablonec nad Nisou – Janov nad Nisou – Jenišovice – Jílové u Držkova – Jiřetín pod Bukovou – Josefův Důl – Koberovy – Kořenov – Líšný – Loužnice – Lučany nad Nisou – Malá Skála – Maršovice – Nová Ves nad Nisou – Pěnčín – Plavy – Pulečný – Radčice – Rádlo – Rychnov u Jablonce nad Nisou – Skuhrov – Smržovka – Tanvald – Velké Hamry – Vlastiboř – Zásada – Železný Brod – Zlatá Olešnice

== Geography ==
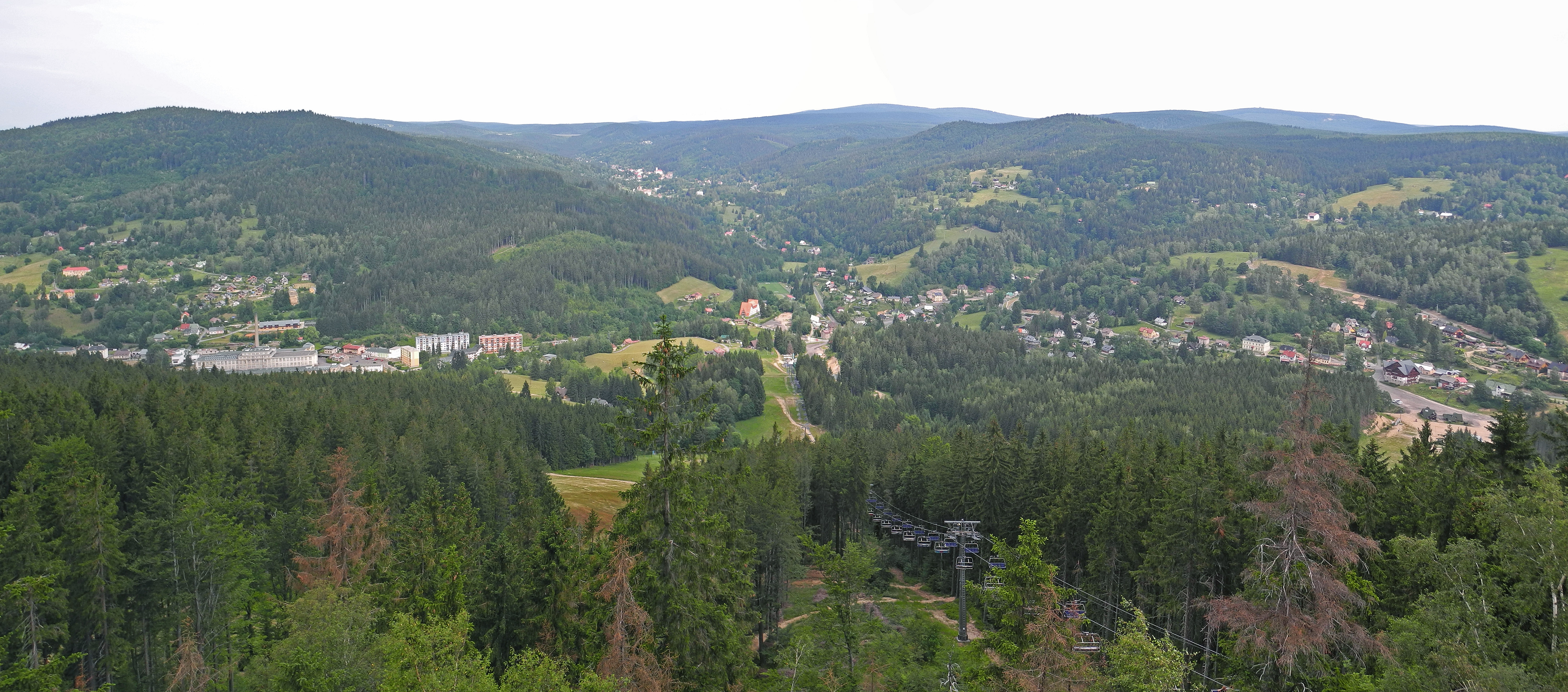
Josefův Důl and surrounding landscape

Jablonec nad Nisou District borders Poland in the northeast. The terrain is very rugged, mountainous in the north and hilly in the south. The territory extends into six geomorphological mesoregions: Jizera Mountains (north and centre), Giant Mountains (east), Giant Mountains Foothills (southeast), Zittau Basin (west), Ještěd–Kozákov Ridge (a strip in the south) and Jičín Uplands (south). The highest point of the district is the mountain Luboch in Harrachov with an elevation of 1,296 m (4,252 ft). The lowest point is the river bed of the Jizera in Malá Skála at 254 m (833 ft).

From the total district area of 438.9 km^{2} (169.5 sq mi), agricultural land occupies 128.7 km^{2} (49.7 sq mi), forests occupy 257.6 km^{2} (99.5 sq mi), and water area occupies 6.4 km^{2} (2.5 sq mi). Forests cover 58.7% of the district's area.

The most important rivers are the Lusatian Neisse, Jizera and Jizera's tributary, the Kamenice. The area is poor in bodies of water. The largest bodies of water are the reservoirs Josefův Důl and Souš.

Most of the Giant Mountains area of the district is protected as the Krkonoše National Park and belongs to the most valuable area of the country thanks to a significant amount of rare flora and fauna. The entire north of the district belongs to the Jizerské hory Protected Landscape Area. The Bohemian Paradise Protected Landscape Area extends into the district in the south.

== Demographics ==
Historical population

Year	Pop.	±%
1869	78,183	—
1880	85,808	+9.8%
1890	99,952	+16.5%
1900	114,625	+14.7%
1910	131,012	+14.3%

Year	Pop.	±%
1921	115,185	−12.1%
1930	133,458	+15.9%
1950	82,144	−38.4%
1961	83,683	+1.9%
1970	81,931	−2.1%

Year	Pop.	±%
1980	87,803	+7.2%
1991	88,118	+0.4%
2001	88,154	+0.0%
2011	88,200	+0.1%
2021	89,446	+1.4%

Source: Censuses

=== Most populous municipalities ===
Name	Population	Area (km^{2})
Jablonec nad Nisou	46,206	31
Železný Brod	5,993	23
Tanvald	5,941	12
Smržovka	3,901	15
Desná	2,986	13
Rychnov u Jablonce nad Nisou	2,845	12
Velké Hamry	2,716	9
Pěnčín	2,102	13
Lučany nad Nisou	1,958	13
Janov nad Nisou	1,488	15

== Economy ==
The largest employers with headquarters in Jablonec nad Nisou District and at least 500 employees are:

Economic entity	Location	Number of employees	Main activity
ZF Automotive Czech	Jablonec nad Nisou	1,500–1,999	Manufacture of parts for motor vehicles
Jablonec nad Nisou Hospital	Jablonec nad Nisou	1,000–1,499	Health care
Preciosa	Jablonec nad Nisou	1,000–1,499	Manufacture and processing of glass
TI Automotive AC	Jablonec nad Nisou	500–999	Manufacture of parts for motor vehicles
Preciosa Ornela	Zásada	500–999	Manufacture and processing of glass

== Transport ==
There are no motorways in the district territory. The R/35 expressway, the continuation of the D10 motorway from Prague to Liberec, runs along the western border of the district. The most important road that pass through the district is the I/14 road from Liberec to Trutnov.

== Sights ==
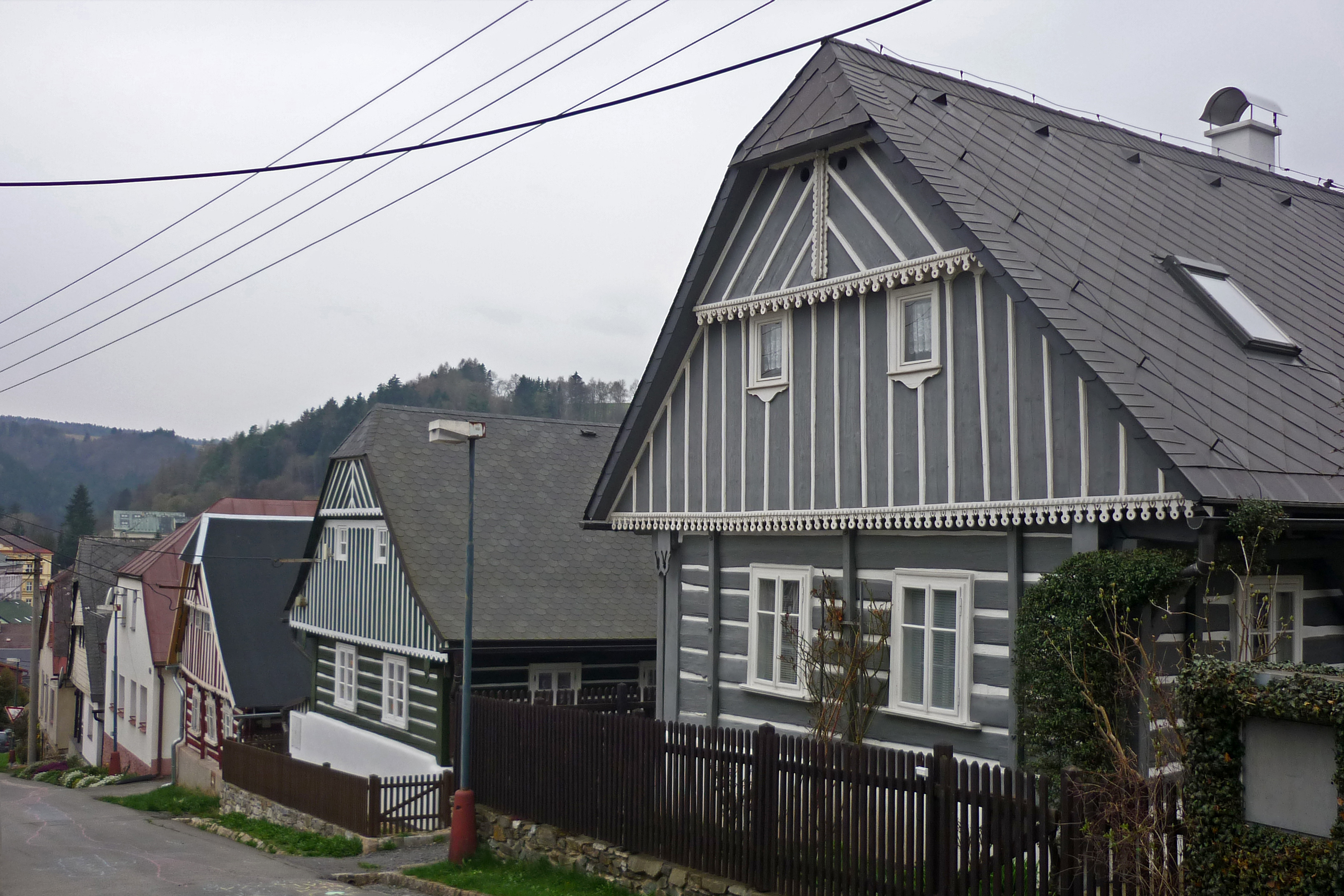
Železný Brod-Trávníky

The most important monuments in the district, protected as national cultural monuments, are:

- Grinding plant of the glass factory in Harrachov
- New Town Hall in Jablonec nad Nisou

The best-preserved settlements, protected as monument reservations and monument zones, are:

- Jizerka (monument reservation)
- Železný Brod-Trávníky (monument reservation)
- Jablonec nad Nisou
- Železný Brod

The most visited tourist destination is the Polish–Czech Friendship Trail.
