= Rychnov u Jablonce nad Nisou =

- Town
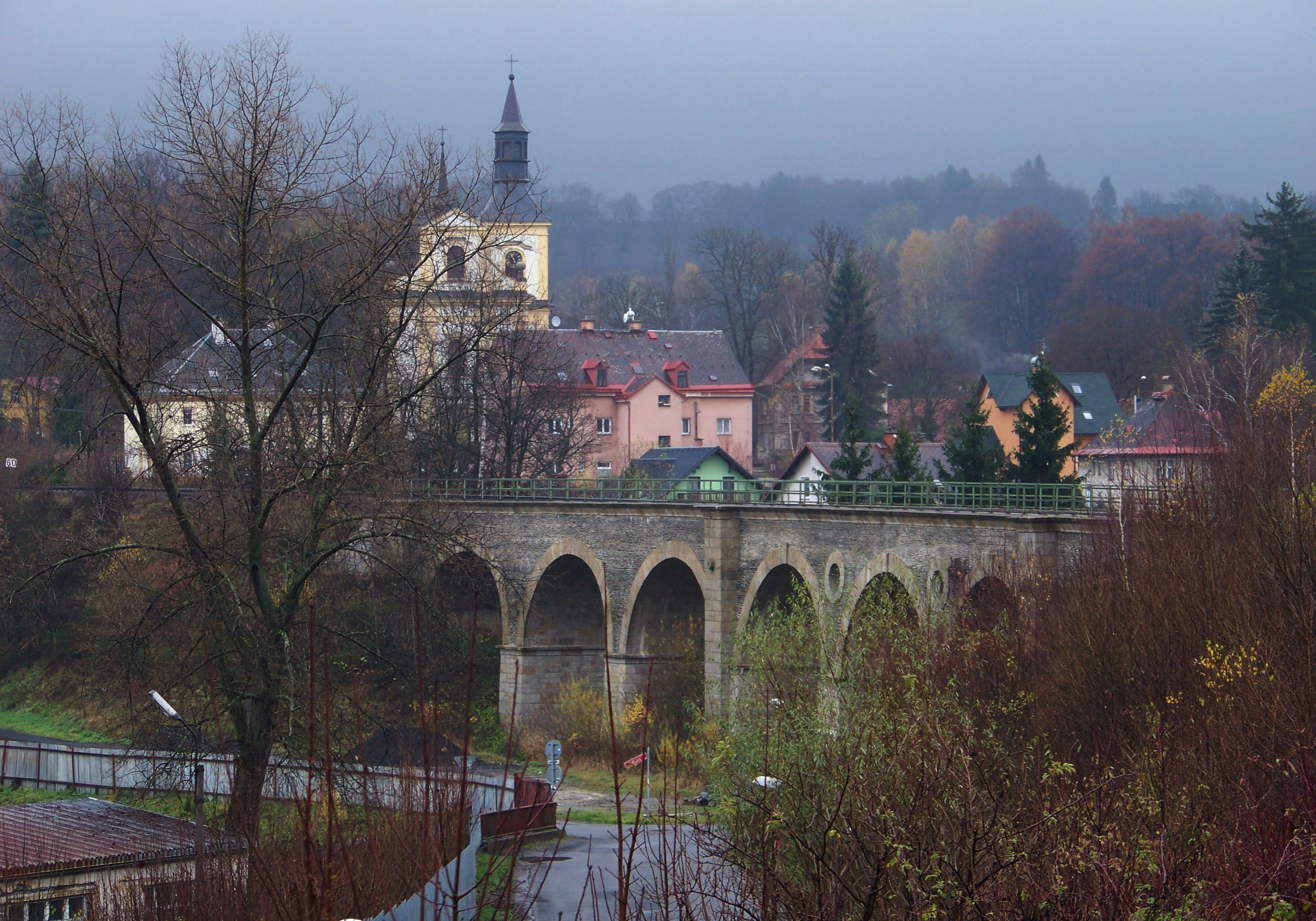
- View over the viaduct

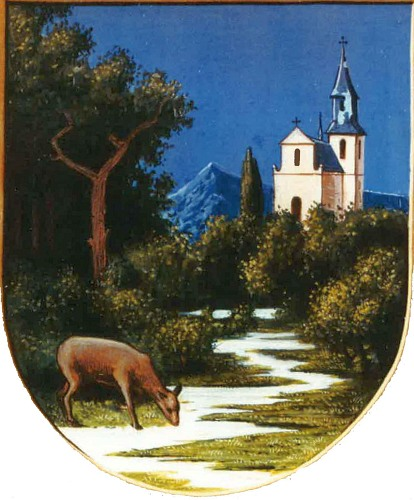
- Flag Coat of arms

- Location in the Czech Republic
- Coordinates: 50°41′2″N 15°9′0″E
- Country: Czech Republic
- Region: Liberec
- District: Jablonec nad Nisou
- First mentioned: 1361

Government
  - Mayor: Tomáš Levinský

Area
  - Total: 12.26 km^{2} (4.73 sq mi)
- Elevation: 435 m (1,427 ft)

Population (2026-01-01)
  - Total: 2,845
  - Density: 232.1/km^{2} (601.0/sq mi)
- Time zone: UTC+1 (CET)
  - Summer (DST): UTC+2 (CEST)
- Postal code: 468 02
- Website: www.rychnovjbc.cz

Rychnov u Jablonce nad Nisou (Czech pronunciation: [ˈrɪxnof ˈu jablontsɛ ˈnad ɲɪsou]; German: Reichenau) is a town in Jablonec nad Nisou District in the Liberec Region of the Czech Republic. It has about 2,800 inhabitants.

== Administrative division ==
Rychnov u Jablonce nad Nisou consists of two municipal parts (in brackets population according to the 2021 census):

- Rychnov u Jablonce nad Nisou (2,671)
- Pelíkovice (52)

== Etymology ==
The name Rychnov is probably derived from the personal name Rychen, meaning "Rychen's (court)".

== Geography ==
Rychnov u Jablonce nad Nisou is located about 4 kilometres (2 mi) south of Jablonec nad Nisou. The northern part of the municipal territory with the town proper lies in the western tip of the Giant Mountains Foothills. The southern part lies in the Ještěd–Kozákov Ridge and includes the highest point of Rychnov u Jablonce nad Nisou, the hill Bienerthův vrch at 614 m (2,014 ft) above sea level. The upper course of the Mohelka River flows through the town.

== History ==
The first written mention of Rychnov is from 1361. It was probably founded by the Cistercians from Mnichovo Hradiště in the 13th century.

In 1856, the railway was built. It helped to the development of the region, from which Rychnov also benefited.

During the German occupation of Czechoslovakia in 1944–1945, the Germans operated a subcamp of the Gross-Rosen concentration camp, whose prisoners were hundreds of men, mostly Poles, but also Czechs, the French, etc.

== Demographics ==
Historical population

Year	Pop.	±%
1869	3,052	—
1880	3,036	−0.5%
1890	3,450	+13.6%
1900	3,803	+10.2%
1910	3,584	−5.8%

Year	Pop.	±%
1921	3,040	−15.2%
1930	3,616	+18.9%
1950	1,858	−48.6%
1961	2,005	+7.9%
1970	1,924	−4.0%

Year	Pop.	±%
1980	1,967	+2.2%
1991	1,822	−7.4%
2001	2,013	+10.5%
2011	2,589	+28.6%
2021	2,723	+5.2%

Source: Censuses

== Transport ==
The I/35 expressway (part of the European route E442) from Liberec to Turnov runs along the western municipal border. The I/65 road, which connects the I/35 with Jablonec nad Nisou, runs north of the town.

Rychnov u Jablonce nad Nisou is located on the railway line Liberec–Pardubice.

== Sights ==
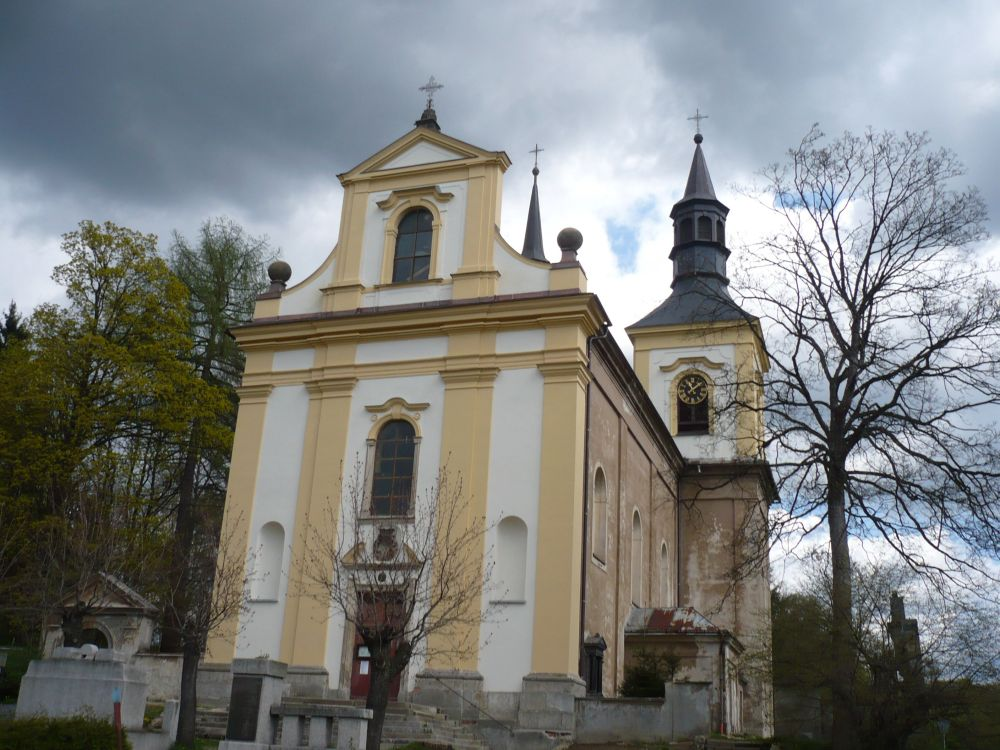
Church of Saint Wenceslaus

The most valuable building in the town is the Church of Saint Wenceslaus. The original wooden church building was as old as the town. The current church was built in the early Baroque style in 1704–1712.

There is a town museum with expositions of concentration camp and local paintings.
