= Pěnčín (Jablonec nad Nisou District) =

- Municipality
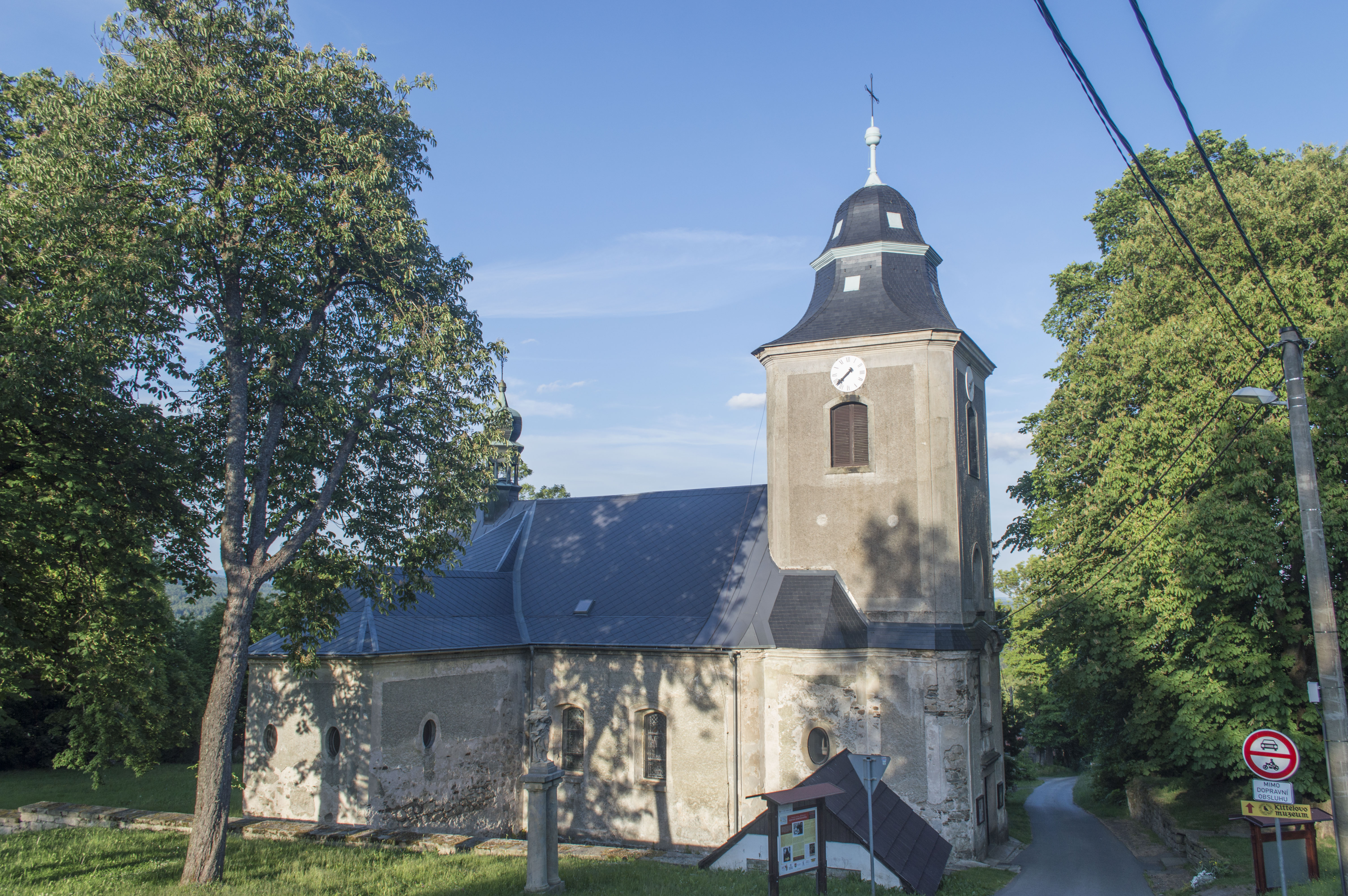
- Church of Saint Joseph

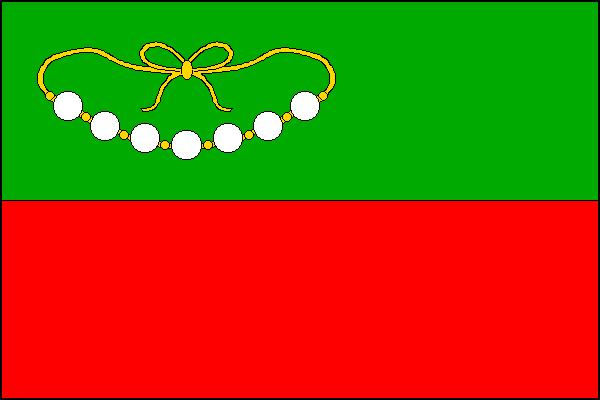
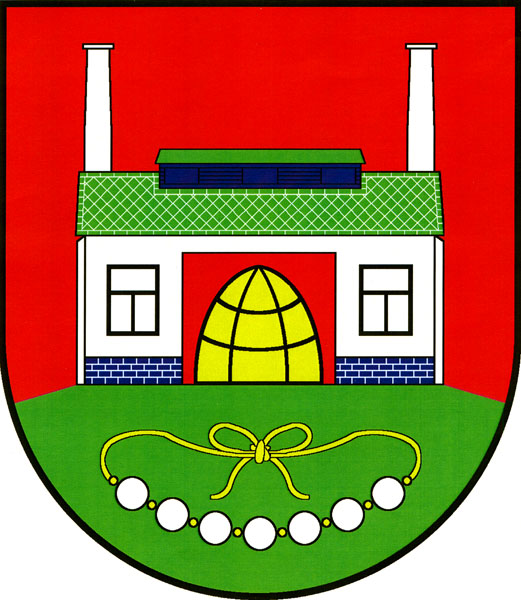
- Flag Coat of arms

- Location in the Czech Republic
- Coordinates: 50°41′16″N 15°14′10″E
- Country: Czech Republic
- Region: Liberec
- District: Jablonec nad Nisou
- First mentioned: 1592

Area
  - Total: 13.38 km^{2} (5.17 sq mi)
- Elevation: 536 m (1,759 ft)

Population (2026-01-01)
  - Total: 2,102
  - Density: 157.1/km^{2} (406.9/sq mi)
- Time zone: UTC+1 (CET)
  - Summer (DST): UTC+2 (CEST)
- Postal codes: 468 21, 468 26
- Website: www.pencin.cz

Pěnčín (German: Pintschei) is a municipality and village in Jablonec nad Nisou District in the Liberec Region of the Czech Republic. It has about 2,100 inhabitants.

== Administrative division ==
Pěnčín consists of seven municipal parts (in brackets population according to the 2021 census):

- Pěnčín (140)
- Alšovice (563)
- Bratříkov (335)
- Dolní Černá Studnice (127)
- Huť (307)
- Jistebsko (337)
- Krásná (167)

== Etymology ==
The initial name of Pěnčín was Pěnicov. The name was derived from the personal name Pěnice, meaning "Pěnice's (court)". In the 19th century, the names Pěncov and Pěnčov were used, and since 1923 the municipality is called Pěnčín.

== Geography ==
Pěnčín is located about 6 kilometres (4 mi) southeast of Jablonec nad Nisou and 14 km (9 mi) southeast of Liberec. It lies on the border between the Giant Mountains Foothills and Jizera Mountains. The highest point is on the slope of the mountain Černá studnice at 845 m (2,772 ft) above sea level. The Žernovník Stream flows through the municipality.

== History ==
The first written mention of Pěnčín is from 1592, when it belonged to the Svijany estate. The oldest villages in the municipality are Alšovice and Jistebsko, first mentioned in 1543.

== Demographics ==
Historical population

| Year | Pop. | ±% |
|---|---|---|
| 1869 | 2,524 | — |
| 1880 | 2,791 | +10.6% |
| 1890 | 2,969 | +6.4% |
| 1900 | 2,995 | +0.9% |
| 1910 | 3,196 | +6.7% |

| Year | Pop. | ±% |
|---|---|---|
| 1921 | 3,024 | −5.4% |
| 1930 | 3,645 | +20.5% |
| 1950 | 2,210 | −39.4% |
| 1961 | 2,361 | +6.8% |
| 1970 | 2,132 | −9.7% |

| Year | Pop. | ±% |
|---|---|---|
| 1980 | 1,911 | −10.4% |
| 1991 | 1,616 | −15.4% |
| 2001 | 1,679 | +3.9% |
| 2011 | 1,901 | +13.2% |
| 2021 | 1,976 | +3.9% |

Source: Censuses

== Transport ==
The I/10 road (part of the European route E65) from Turnov to the Czech–Polish border in Harrachov briefly crosses the southern part of the municipality.

== Sights ==
The most important monument is the Church of Saint Joseph in Krásná. It was built in 1756–1760 and the tower was added in 1779.
