= Pulečný =

- Municipality
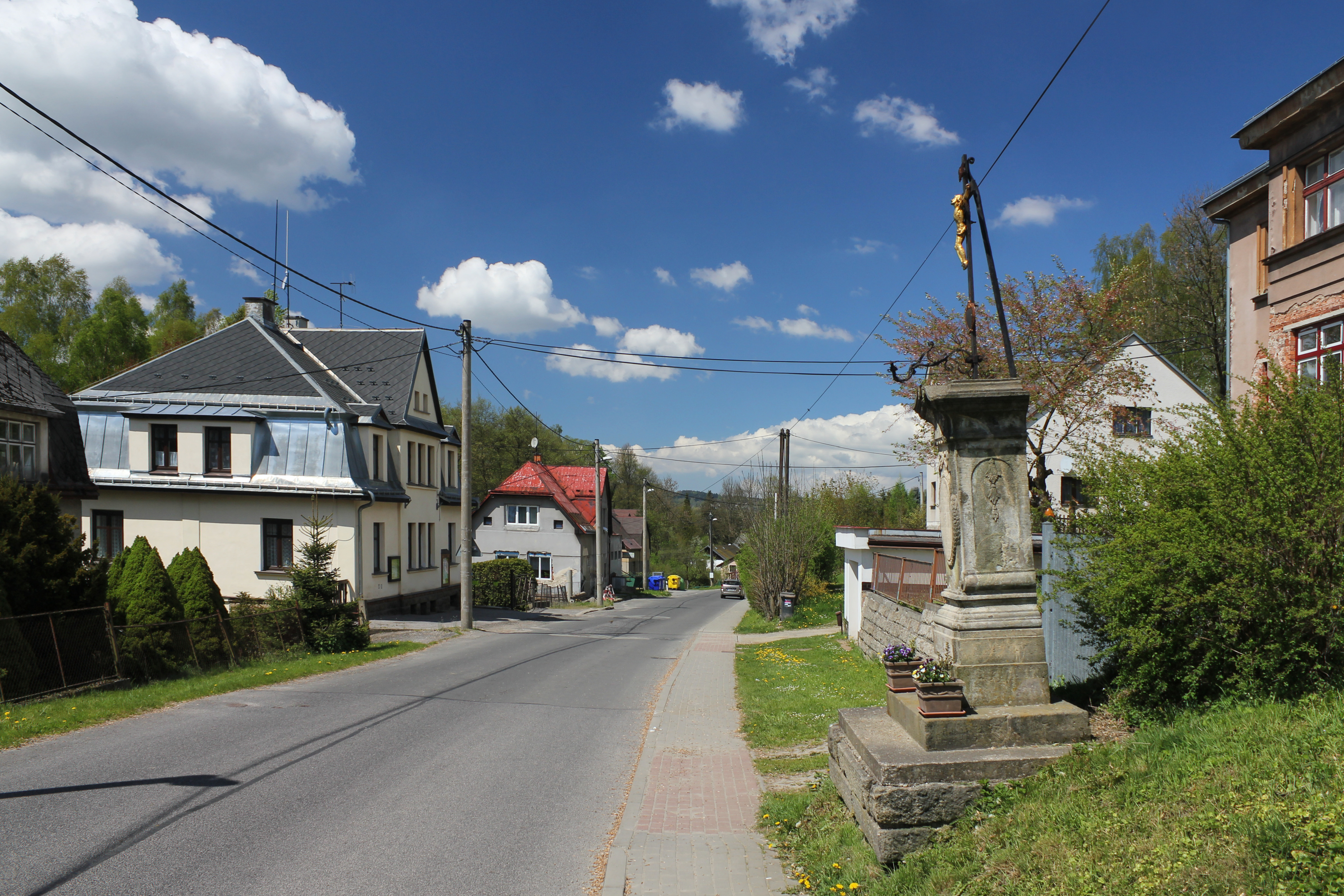
- Main street

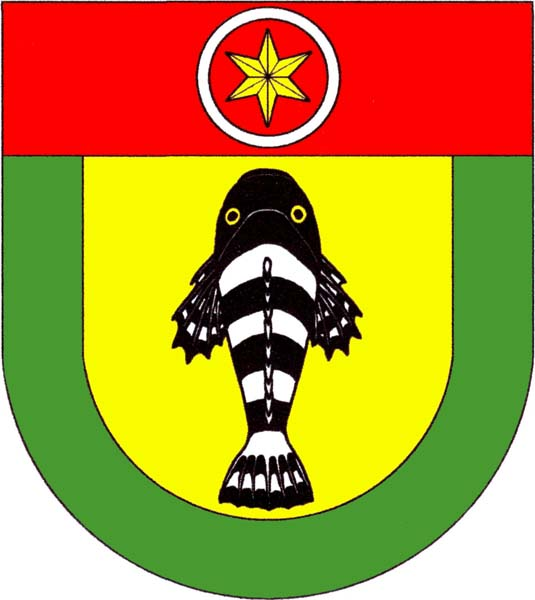
- Flag Coat of arms

- Location in the Czech Republic
- Coordinates: 50°40′32″N 15°10′5″E
- Country: Czech Republic
- Region: Liberec
- District: Jablonec nad Nisou
- First mentioned: 1543

Area
  - Total: 6.00 km^{2} (2.32 sq mi)
- Elevation: 537 m (1,762 ft)

Population (2026-01-01)
  - Total: 489
  - Density: 81.5/km^{2} (211/sq mi)
- Time zone: UTC+1 (CET)
  - Summer (DST): UTC+2 (CEST)
- Postal code: 468 02
- Website: www.pulecny.cz

Pulečný is a municipality and village in Jablonec nad Nisou District in the Liberec Region of the Czech Republic. It has about 500 inhabitants.

== Administrative division ==
Pulečný consists of three municipal parts (in brackets population according to the 2021 census):

- Pulečný (391)
- Klíčnov (52)
- Kopanina (11)

== History ==
The first written mention of Pulečný is from 1543. Between 1636 and 1850, the village was part of the Český Dub estate.

== Demographics ==
Historical population
Year	Pop.	±%
1869	1,083	—
1880	1,017	−6.1%
1890	1,065	+4.7%
1900	1,066	+0.1%
1910	1,086	+1.9%
1921	946	−12.9%
1930	1,023	+8.1%
1950	421	−58.8%
1961	412	−2.1%
1970	376	−8.7%
1980	286	−23.9%
1991	216	−24.5%
2001	260	+20.4%
2011	357	+37.3%
2021	454	+27.2%
Source: Censuses
