= Maršovice (Jablonec nad Nisou District) =

- Municipality
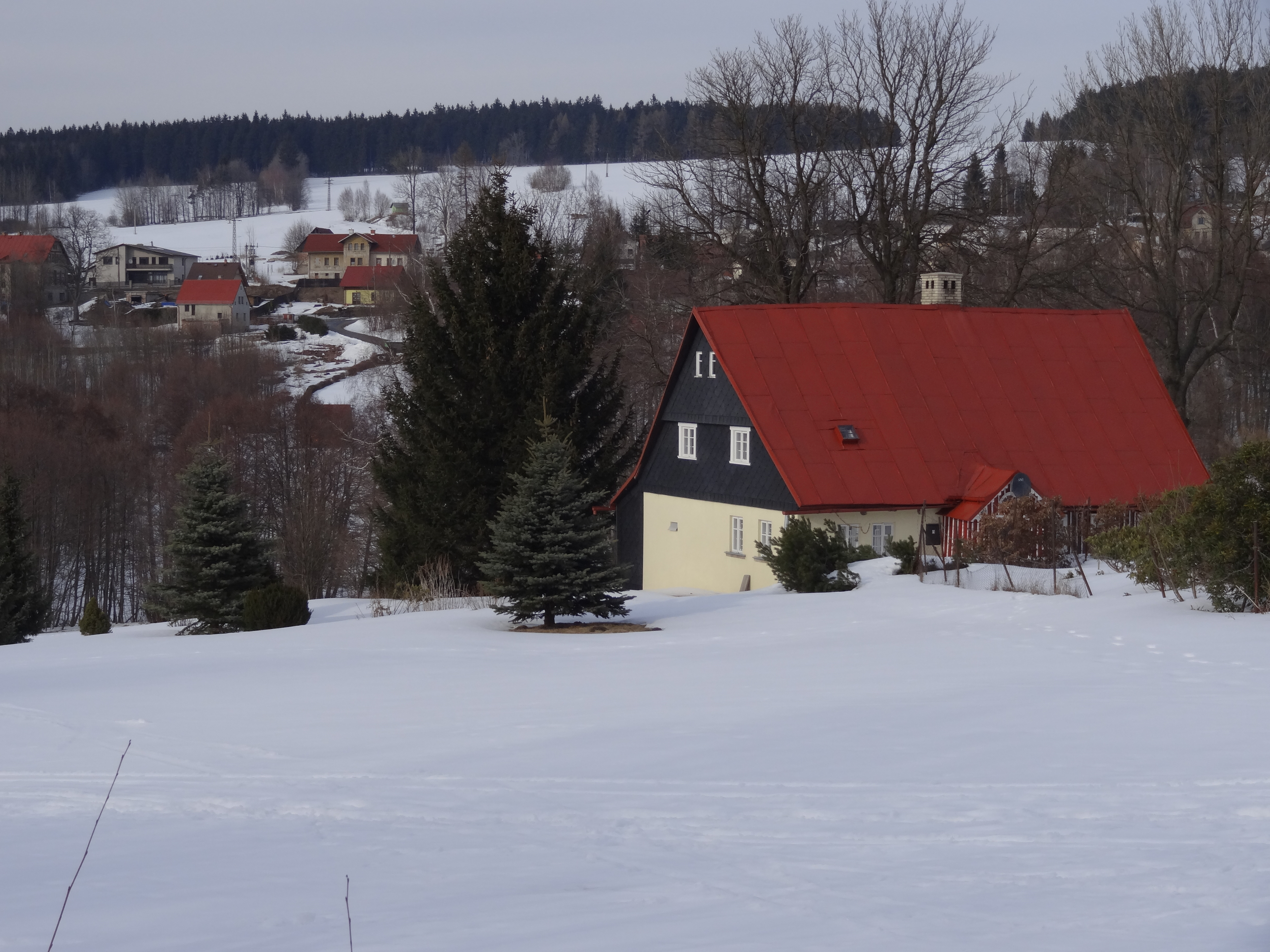
- View from the south

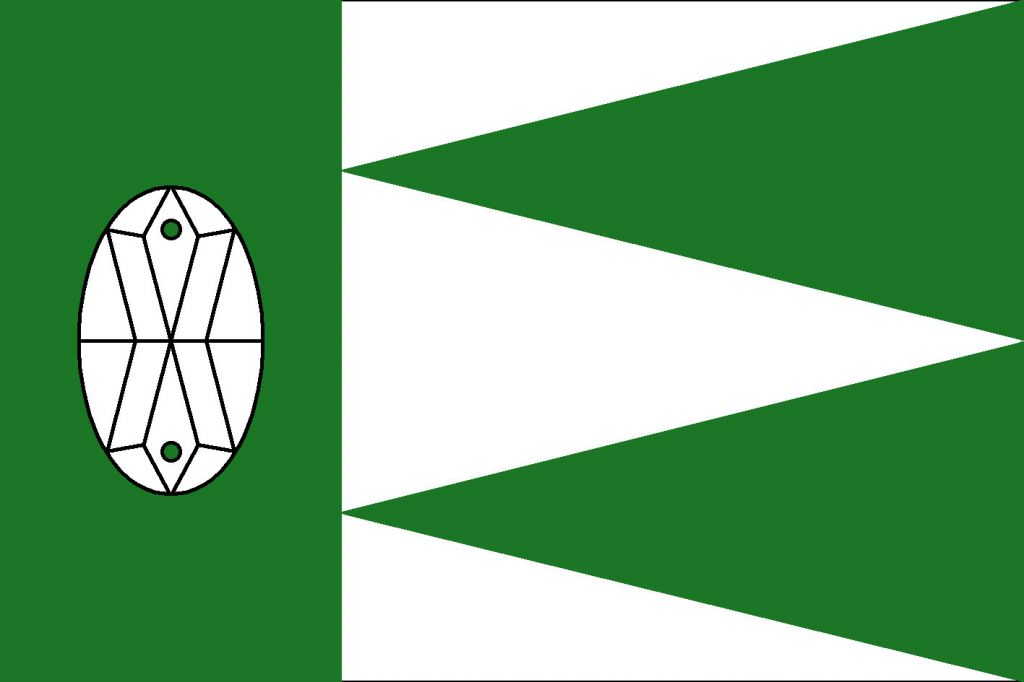
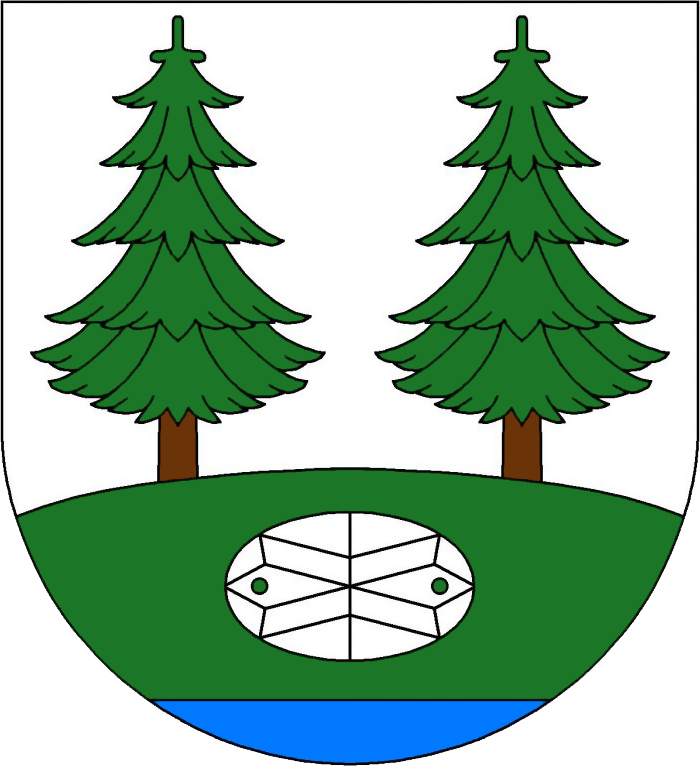
- Flag Coat of arms

- Location in the Czech Republic
- Coordinates: 50°41′47″N 15°11′55″E
- Country: Czech Republic
- Region: Liberec
- District: Jablonec nad Nisou
- First mentioned: 1543

Area
  - Total: 1.76 km^{2} (0.68 sq mi)
- Elevation: 668 m (2,192 ft)

Population (2026-01-01)
  - Total: 638
  - Density: 362/km^{2} (939/sq mi)
- Time zone: UTC+1 (CET)
  - Summer (DST): UTC+2 (CEST)
- Postal codes: 468 01, 468 21
- Website: www.obec-marsovice.cz

Maršovice (German: Marschowitz) is a municipality and village in Jablonec nad Nisou District in the Liberec Region of the Czech Republic. It has about 600 inhabitants.

== Administrative division ==
Maršovice consists of two municipal parts (in brackets population according to the 2021 census):

- Maršovice (536)
- Čížkovice 1.díl (66)

== Etymology ==
The name is derived from the personal name Mareš, meaning "the village of Mareš's people".

== Demographics ==
Historical population
Year	Pop.	±%
1869	496	—
1880	458	−7.7%
1890	621	+35.6%
1900	702	+13.0%
1910	724	+3.1%
1921	679	−6.2%
1930	863	+27.1%
1950	466	−46.0%
1961	517	+10.9%
1970	475	−8.1%
1980	387	−18.5%
1991	360	−7.0%
2001	359	−0.3%
2011	522	+45.4%
2021	602	+15.3%
Source: Censuses
