= Liberec Region =

Region of the Czech Republic

Liberec Region Liberecký kraj
- Region
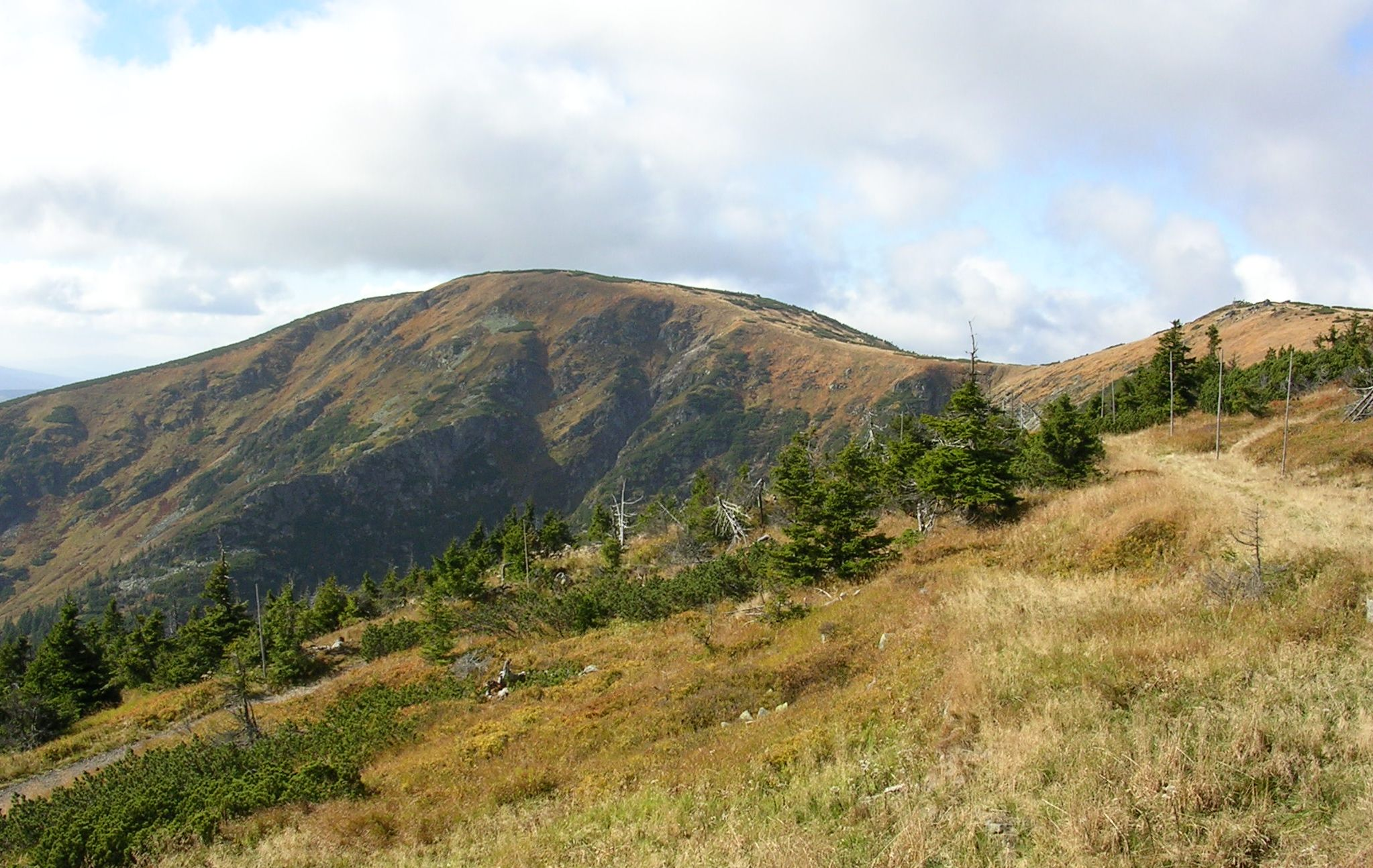

- Flag Coat of arms

- Coordinates: 50°45′N 15°2′E
- Country: Czech Republic
- Capital: Liberec
- Districts: Liberec, Jablonec nad Nisou, Česká Lípa, Semily

Government
  - Governor: Martin Půta (SLK)

Area
  - Total: 3,162.93 km^{2} (1,221.21 sq mi)
- Highest elevation: 1,435 m (4,708 ft)

Population (2024-01-01)
  - Total: 450,728
  - Density: 142.503/km^{2} (369.082/sq mi)

GDP
  - Total: CZK 186.939 billion (€7.291 billion)
- ISO 3166 code: CZ-51
- Vehicle registration: L
- Website: www.kraj-lbc.cz

Liberec Region (Czech: Liberecký kraj) is an administrative unit (Czech: kraj) of the Czech Republic, located in the northernmost part of its historical region of Bohemia. It is named after its capital Liberec. The region shares international borders with Germany and Poland. Domestically the region borders the Ústí nad Labem Region to the west, the Central Bohemian Region to the south and the Hradec Králové Region to the east.

== Administrative divisions ==
The Liberec Region is divided into 4 districts:

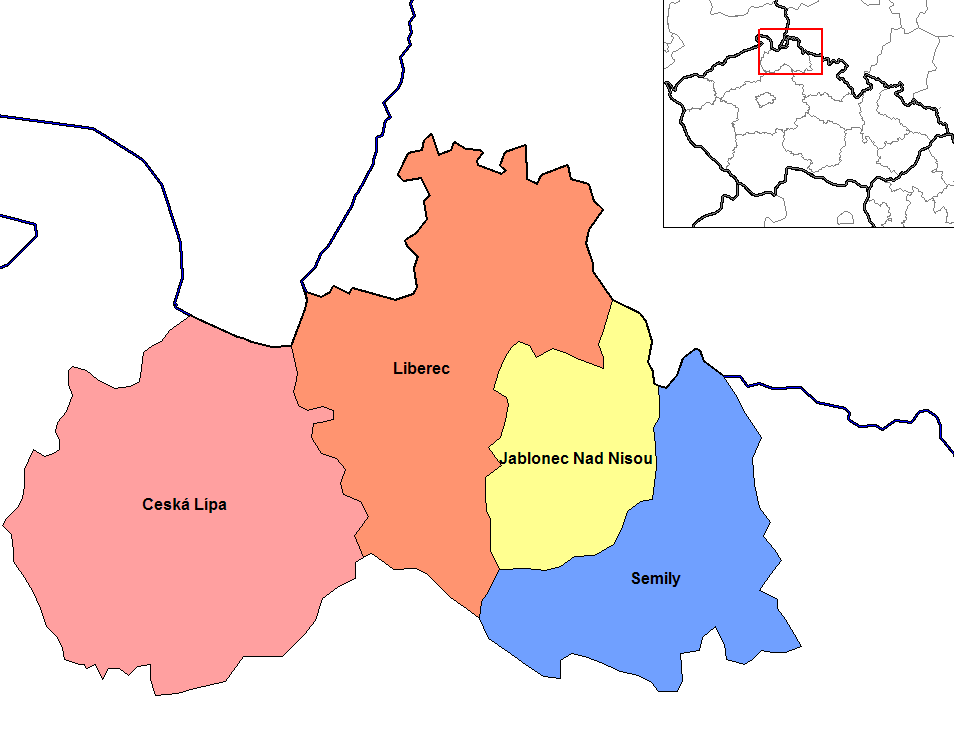
Districts of Liberec Region

Česká Lípa; Jablonec Nad Nisou	Liberec; Semily

At a lower level, the region has 215 municipalities, comprising 65 in the Semily District, 59 in the Jablonec nad Nisou District, 57 in the Česká Lípa District and 34 in the Liberec District.

== Cities and towns ==
The table below gives an overview of towns and cities in the region that have at least 7,000 inhabitants (as of 1 January 2024).

Name	Population	Area (km^{2})	District
Liberec	107,982	106	Liberec District
Jablonec nad Nisou	46,226	31	Jablonec nad Nisou District
Česká Lípa	37,483	66	Česká Lípa District
Turnov	14,502	23	Semily District
Nový Bor	11,412	20	Česká Lípa District
Semily	8,081	16	Semily District
Hrádek nad Nisou	7,932	49	Liberec District
Frýdlant	7,388	32	Liberec District

== Physical geography ==
The region's landscape includes the Jizera Mountains, part of the Krkonoše Mountains and part of the Lusatian Mountains.

The region was affected by flash floods in August 2010, with swelling of the river Smědá being one of the factors to prompt evacuation efforts in the region.

== Demographics ==
As of 1 January 2019, the population of the Liberec Region was 442,356 with 217,791 men and 224,565 women, accounting for 49.2% and 50.8% of the population respectively.

Historical population

Year	Pop.	±%
1869	464,647	—
1880	487,504	+4.9%
1890	510,741	+4.8%
1900	539,404	+5.6%
1910	571,529	+6.0%

Year	Pop.	±%
1921	520,393	−8.9%
1930	558,664	+7.4%
1950	372,813	−33.3%
1961	381,742	+2.4%
1970	381,626	−0.0%

Year	Pop.	±%
1980	411,209	+7.8%
1991	425,120	+3.4%
2001	428,184	+0.7%
2011	432,439	+1.0%
2021	435,220	+0.6%

Source: Censuses

== Economy ==
The Liberec Region hosts manufacturing, glassmaking, mechanical engineering and jewellery production industries among others. The region is part of the so-called Black Triangle, an area of heavy industrialization and environmental damage on the three-way border of Poland, Germany, and the Czech Republic.

== Culture ==
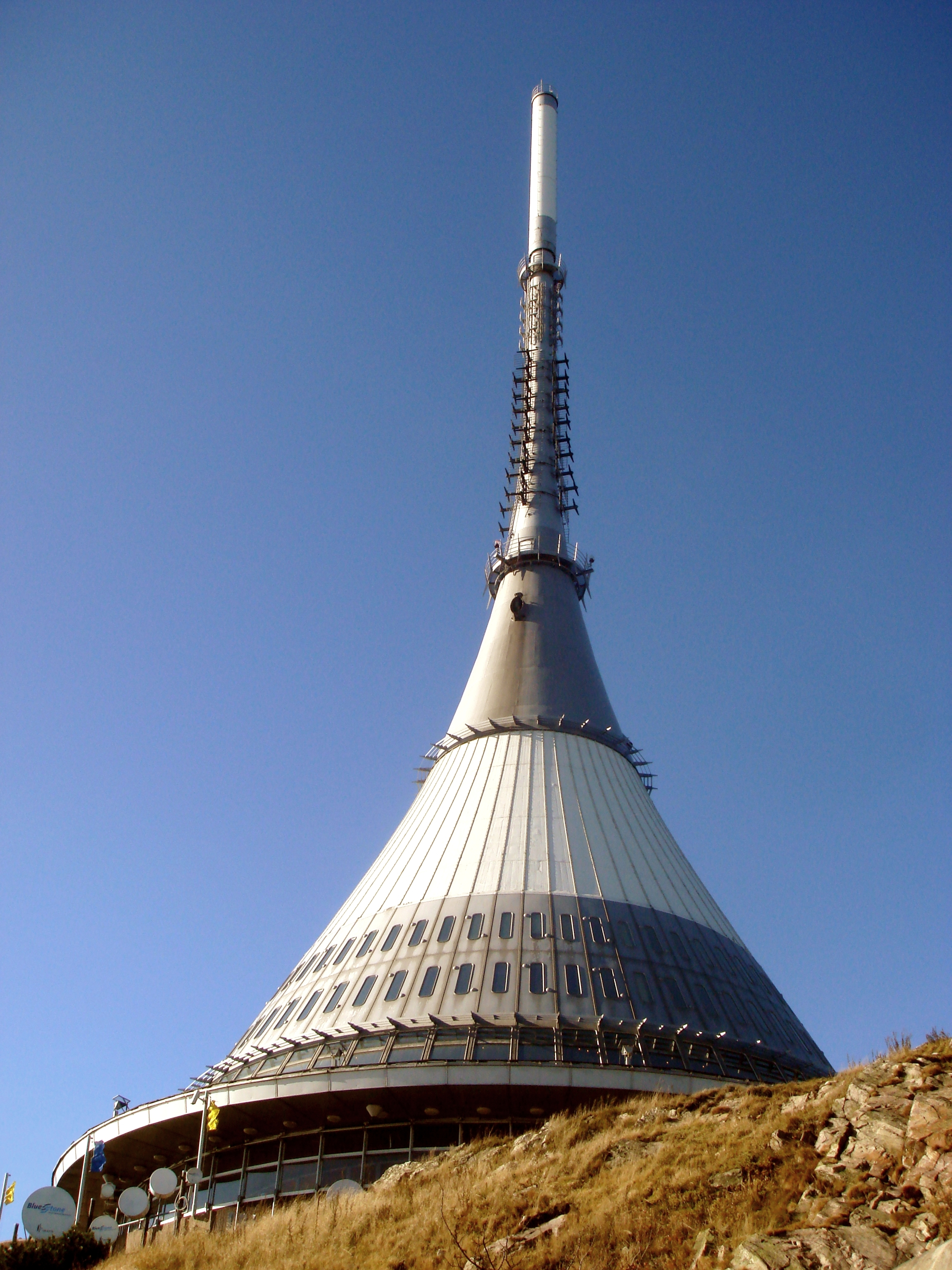
Ještěd Tower

The Liberec Region is home to 11 national cultural monuments including Bezděz Castle, Dlaskův statek in Dolánky u Turnova and the Ještěd Tower which transmits television signals as well as being a hotel. 2013 saw the proposal of an additional two sites to the list, those being a glass grinding plant in Harrachov dating from 1895 and the Janatův Mlýn watermill in Buřany, Jablonec nad Jizerou part of which remains from 1767.

A Neolithic site dating to around 4,500 BC was uncovered in 2007 near the village of Příšovice.

Lake Mácha near the town of Doksy is an important regional centre for leisure, attracting around 30,000 visitors annually. The vicinity of the lake has a caravan park and hosts an annual music festival called Mácháč, which was attended by approximately 8,000 people in 2013.

Since the region was for a long time part of the Holy Roman Empire, and later (in 1938–1945) the major part of the region was a part of Germany as part of Sudetenland, the local buildings and the culture in general have been influenced by the Germans, also considering the fact that parts of the region were populated by a majority of Sudeten Germans, prior to their expulsion after World War II.

== Transport ==
The region is linked to Prague by the D10 motorway, which terminates in the town of Turnov. The length of operated railway lines in the region is 551 km (342 mi). Three airports are in the region; Hradčany Airport, a disused military airport near the town of Ralsko, is the most significant. Other minor airports exist in Česká Lípa and Hodkovice nad Mohelkou.

== Education ==
The region is home to the public Technical University of Liberec, which was founded in 1953. The university, which originally specialized in Mechanical and Textile Engineering, added a further four faculties in the 1990s, namely those specialising in Education, Economy, Architecture and Mechatronics.
