= List of castles in the Liberec Region =

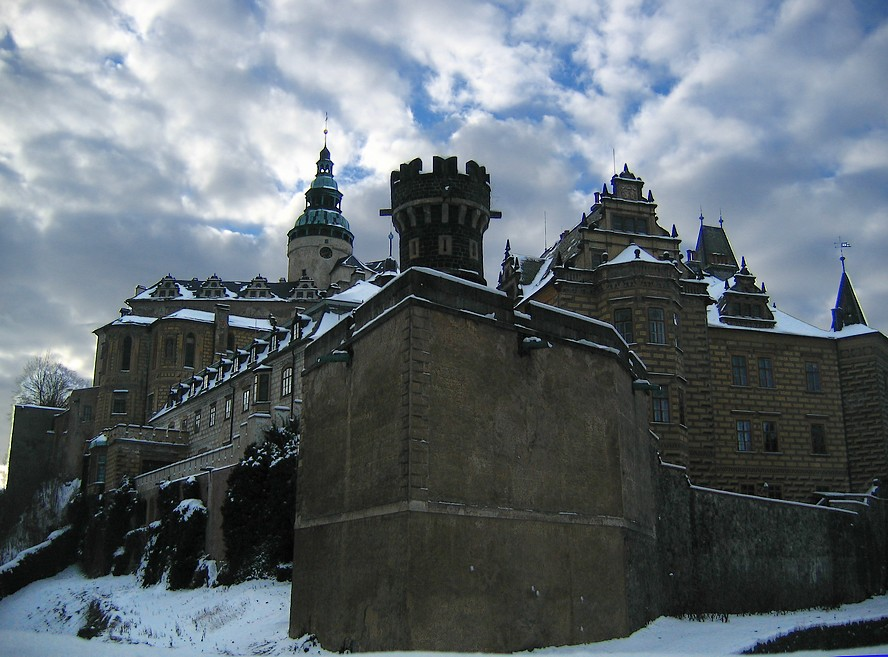
Frýdlant Castle

This is a list of castles and chateaux located in the Liberec Region of the Czech Republic.

== A ==
- Arthurův hrad Castle

== B ==
- Berštejn Castle
- Bezděz Castle
- Bredovský letohrádek Chateau

== C ==
- Chudý hrádek Castle
- Čap Castle
- Čertova ruka Castle

== D ==
- Děvín Castle
- Doksy Chateau
- Dolánky Castle
- Dolní Štěpanice Castle
- Drábovna Castle
- Dubá Castle

== F ==
- Falkenburk Castle
- Frýdlant Chateau
- Frýdštejn Castle

== G ==
- Grabštejn Castle

== H ==
- Hamrštejn Castle
- Horní Branná Chateau
- Horní Libchava Chateau
- Horní Police Chateau
- Houska Castle
- Hrad u Hostíkovic Castle
- Hrad u Hvězdy Castle
- Hrad u Kluku (Dražejova) Castle
- Hrad u Kvítkova Castle
- Hrad u Velenic Castle
- Hrubá Skála Chateau
- Hrubý Rohozec Chateau
- Hřídelík Castle
- Hrádek nad Nisou Castle

== J ==
- Jesenný Chateau
- Jestřebí Castle
- Jezdec Castle
- Jilemnice Chateau
- Jiljov Castle

== K ==
- Kavčiny Castle
- Klinštejn Castle
- Konvalinkový vrch Castle
- Košťálov Castle
- Kozlov Castle
- Krompach Chateau
- Křída Castle
- Kvítkov Castle

== L ==
- Lemberk Chateau
- Levín Castle
- Lipý Castle
- Lomnice nad Popelkou Chateau
- Loubí Castle
- Loupežnický vrch Castle

== M ==
- Malá Skála Chateau
- Malý Rohozec Chateau
- Milčany Castle
- Milštejn Castle
- Mimoň Castle
- Myšlín Castle

== N ==
- Návarov Castle
- Návarov Chateau
- Nebákov Castle
- Nístějka Castle
- Nová Louka Chateau
- Nový Berštejn Chateau
- Nový Falkenburg Chateau

== P ==
- Pachtovský zámeček Chateau
- Pihel Castle

== R ==
- Ralsko Castle
- Roimund Castle
- Ronov Castle
- Rotštejn Castle
- Rousínovský hrádek Castle

== S ==
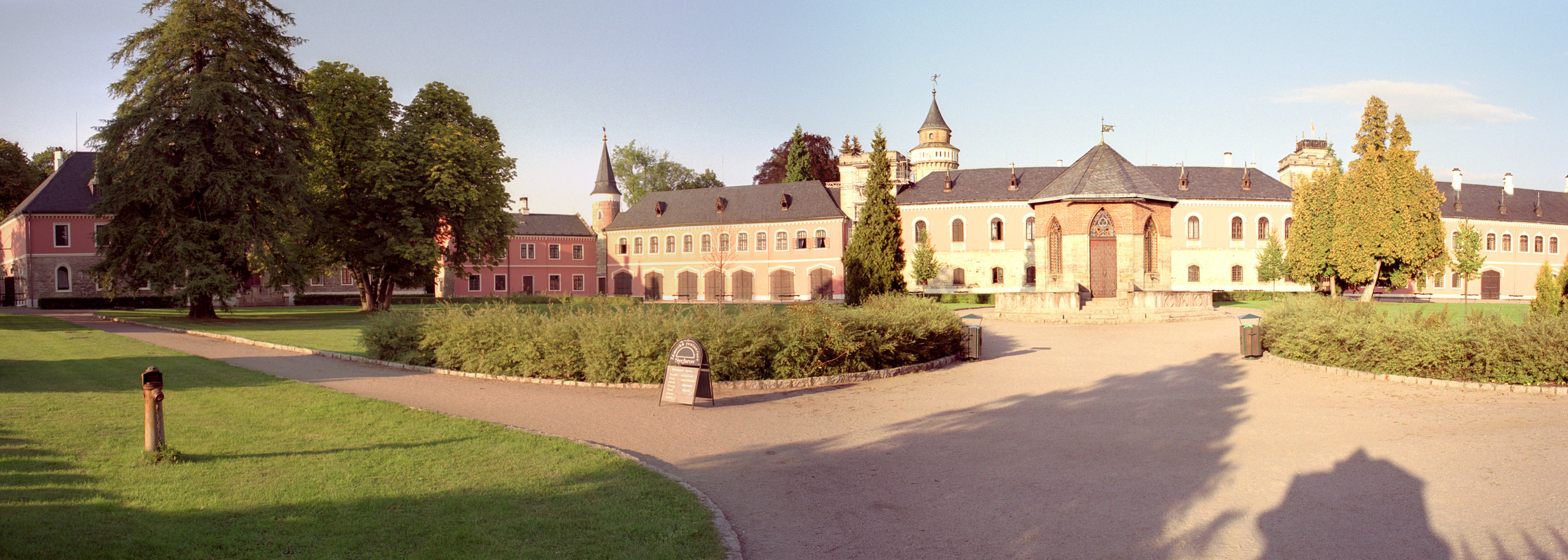
Sychrov Castle.

- Skalní hrad Castle
- Sloup Castle
- Sloup Chateau
- Smržovka Chateau
- Starý Berštejn Castle
- Stohánek Castle
- Studenec Chateau
- Stvolínky Chateau
- Svijany Chateau
- Svojkov Castle
- Sychrov Chateau

== T ==
- Tlustec Chateau
- Trosky Castle

== V ==
- Valdštejn Castle
- Vartemberk Chateau
- Velenice Castle
- Velký Valtinov Chateau
- Velký Valtinov Chateau
- Vítkovec Chateau
- Vranov Castle
- Vřísek Castle

== Z ==
- Zahrádky - letohrádek Chateau
- Zahrádky Castle
- Zahrádky Chateau
- Zakšín Castle
- Zákupy Chateau
- Zámecký vrch Castle
- Zbirohy Castle
- Zbyny Castle
- Zkamenělý zámek - Hrad u Konrádova Castle
- Žacléř Chateau

== See also ==
- List of castles in the Czech Republic
- List of castles in Europe
- List of castles
