= Slapy =

Slapy may refer to places in the Czech Republic:

- Slapy (Prague-West District), a municipality and village in the Central Bohemian Region
  - Slapy Reservoir
- Slapy (Tábor District), a municipality and village in the South Bohemian Region
- Slapy, a hamlet and part of Frýdštejn in the South Bohemian Region
