= Rakousy =

- Municipality
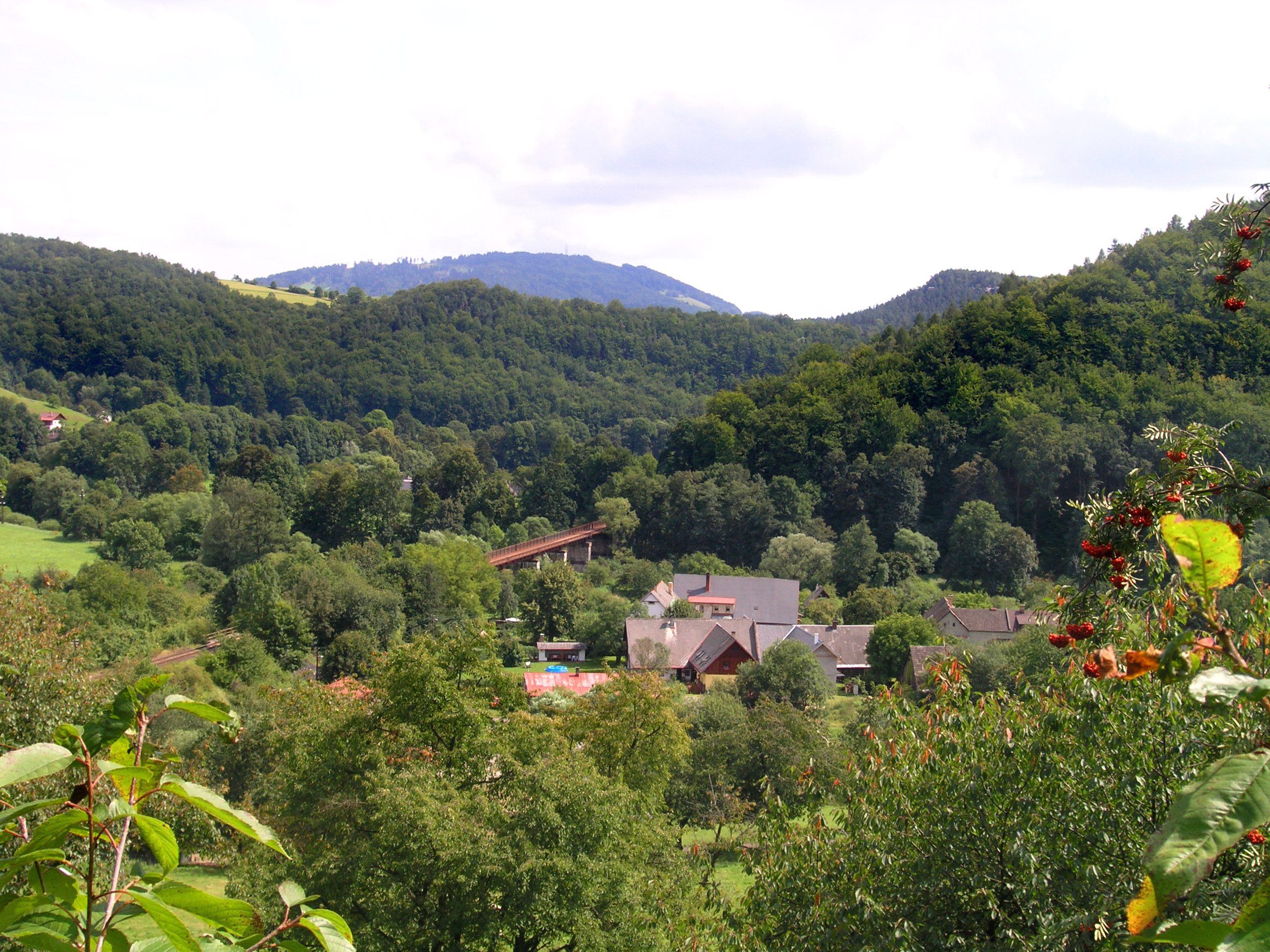
- General view

- Location in the Czech Republic
- Coordinates: 50°37′13″N 15°11′15″E
- Country: Czech Republic
- Region: Liberec
- District: Semily
- First mentioned: 1540

Area
  - Total: 1.40 km^{2} (0.54 sq mi)
- Elevation: 257 m (843 ft)

Population (2026-01-01)
  - Total: 105
  - Density: 75.0/km^{2} (194/sq mi)
- Time zone: UTC+1 (CET)
  - Summer (DST): UTC+2 (CEST)
- Postal code: 511 01
- Website: www.rakousy.eu

Rakousy is a municipality and village in Semily District in the Liberec Region of the Czech Republic. It has about 100 inhabitants.

== History ==
The first written mention of Rakousy is from 1540. Until 1766, the village belonged to various estates (Český Dub, Frýdštejn, Malá Skála and Hrubý Rohozec). In 1766–1775, the area was divided between various owners.

== Demographics ==
Historical population
Year	Pop.	±%
1869	152	—
1880	146	−3.9%
1890	145	−0.7%
1900	146	+0.7%
1910	161	+10.3%
1921	145	−9.9%
1930	144	−0.7%
1950	109	−24.3%
1961	102	−6.4%
1970	87	−14.7%
1980	97	+11.5%
1991	84	−13.4%
2001	77	−8.3%
2011	73	−5.2%
2021	97	+32.9%
Source: Censuses
