= Frýdštejn Castle =

Castle ruin in Liberec Region, Czechia

Frýdštejn
- Frýdštejn, Liberec Region
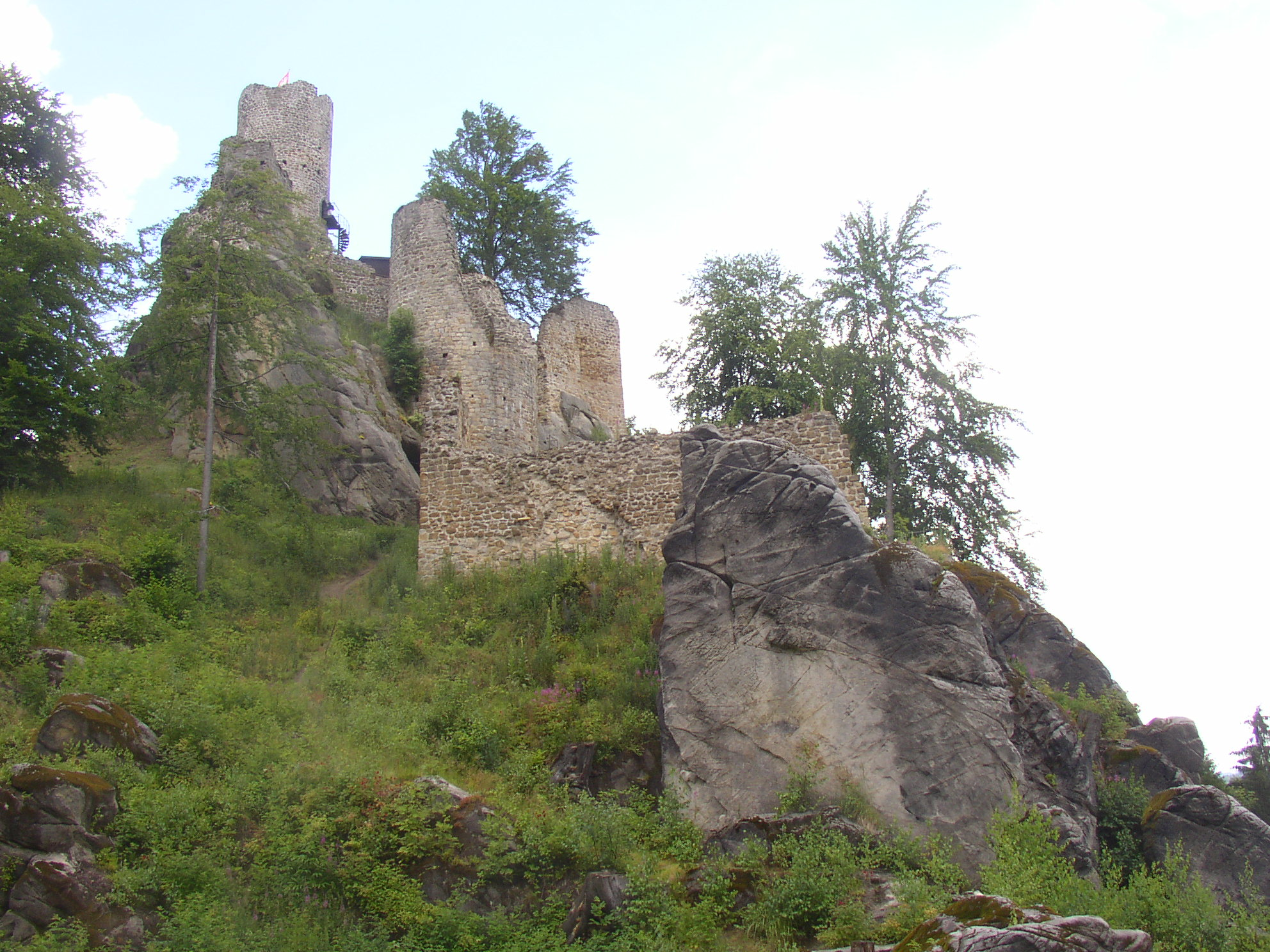
- Frýdštejn Castle

Site information
- Type: Castle

Location
- Location in the Czech Republic
- Coordinates: 50°38′55″N 15°10′04″E

Site history
- Built: 1385

Frýdštejn Castle (German: Burg Friedstein) is a castle ruin in Frýdštejn in the Liberec Region of the Czech Republic. It is one of three castles in Jablonec nad Nisou District. A typical rock castle, it lies on the upper end of a long sandstone rock ridge. The castle dominates the nearby Jizera river valley and the old trade route from Turnov to the north.

== History ==
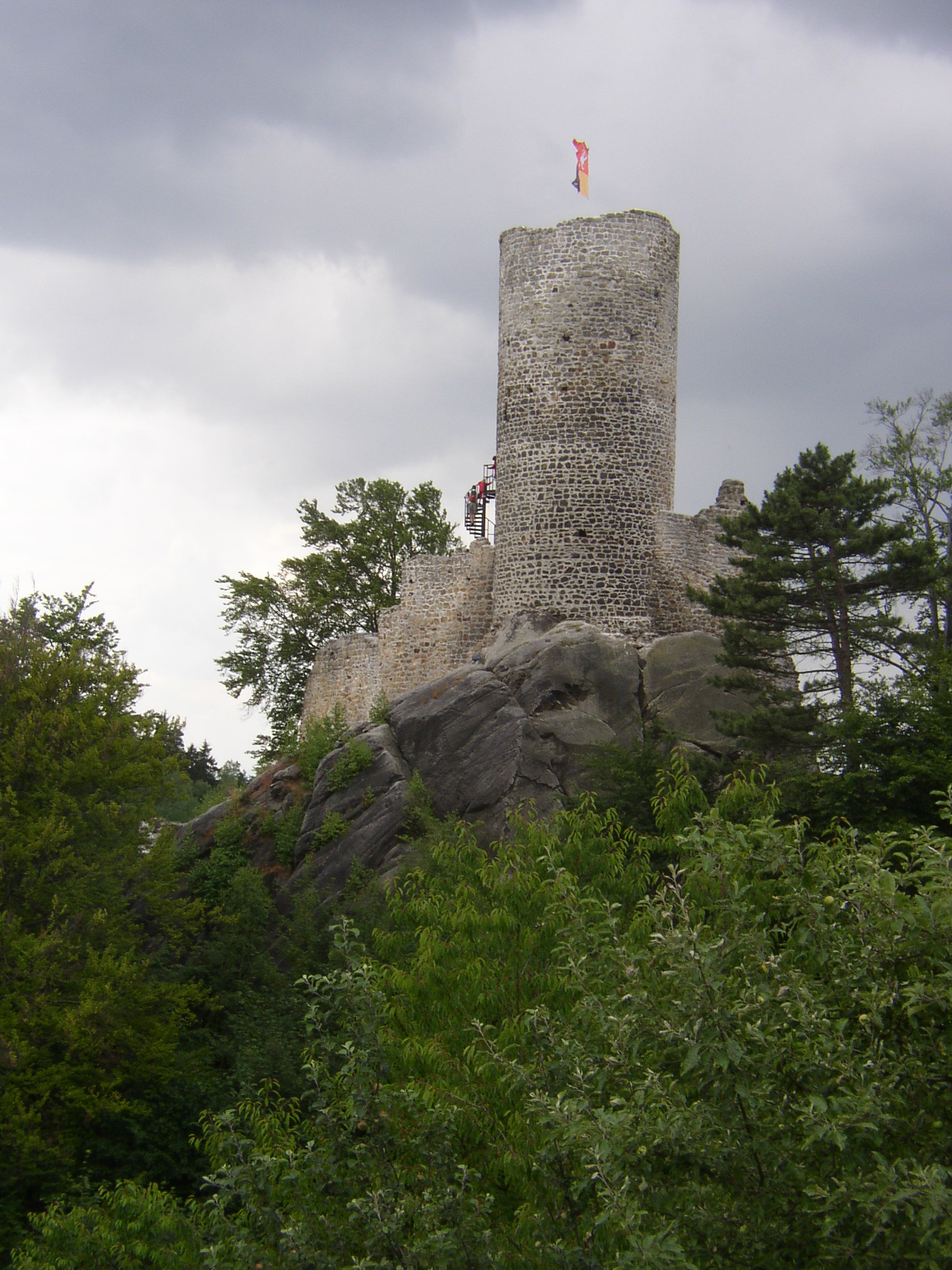
Frýdštejn from the north route

Frýdštejn was constructed during 14th century (exact date is not known). It is mentioned for the first time in a church source from 1385. Being owned by a Catholic it was besieged by Hussites in August 1432 but its lord had agreed to cease hostilities and later joined the Hussites. The castle had changed owners several times. After a sale in 1556 it lost its function as a watchtower and at the end of 16th century it was no longer inhabited. During the Thirty Years' War marauders, deserters, and fugitives of every kind found shelter here.

The whereabouts of the original entrance into the castle is not known. It is believed to be on the right of the tower through the ground floor of the palace itself, a castle lord's residence. Today's entrance was built in modern times.

As there was little space in the castle, a number of small rooms were carved out in the rock, including a small chapel. The dominant feature of the castle is a large tower ("bergfrit") built on the highest rock. The tower is the best conserved part of the castle. It is 15 metres (49 ft) high, has a diameter of 9 metres (30 ft), and its walls are 2 metres (7 ft) thick. The only entrance was on the first floor, about 6 to 7 metres (20 to 23 ft) above yard level.

The public has been allowed to visit the ruins since the 1890s, when the Turnov Adornment Club bought it from Prince of Rohan, who lived in Sychrov Castle. The club had the conserved masonry reinforced. Archaeological findings from this period are available in the Turnov Museum. Today the castle is owned by the municipality of Frýdštejn, which preserves its current state.

== Gallery ==
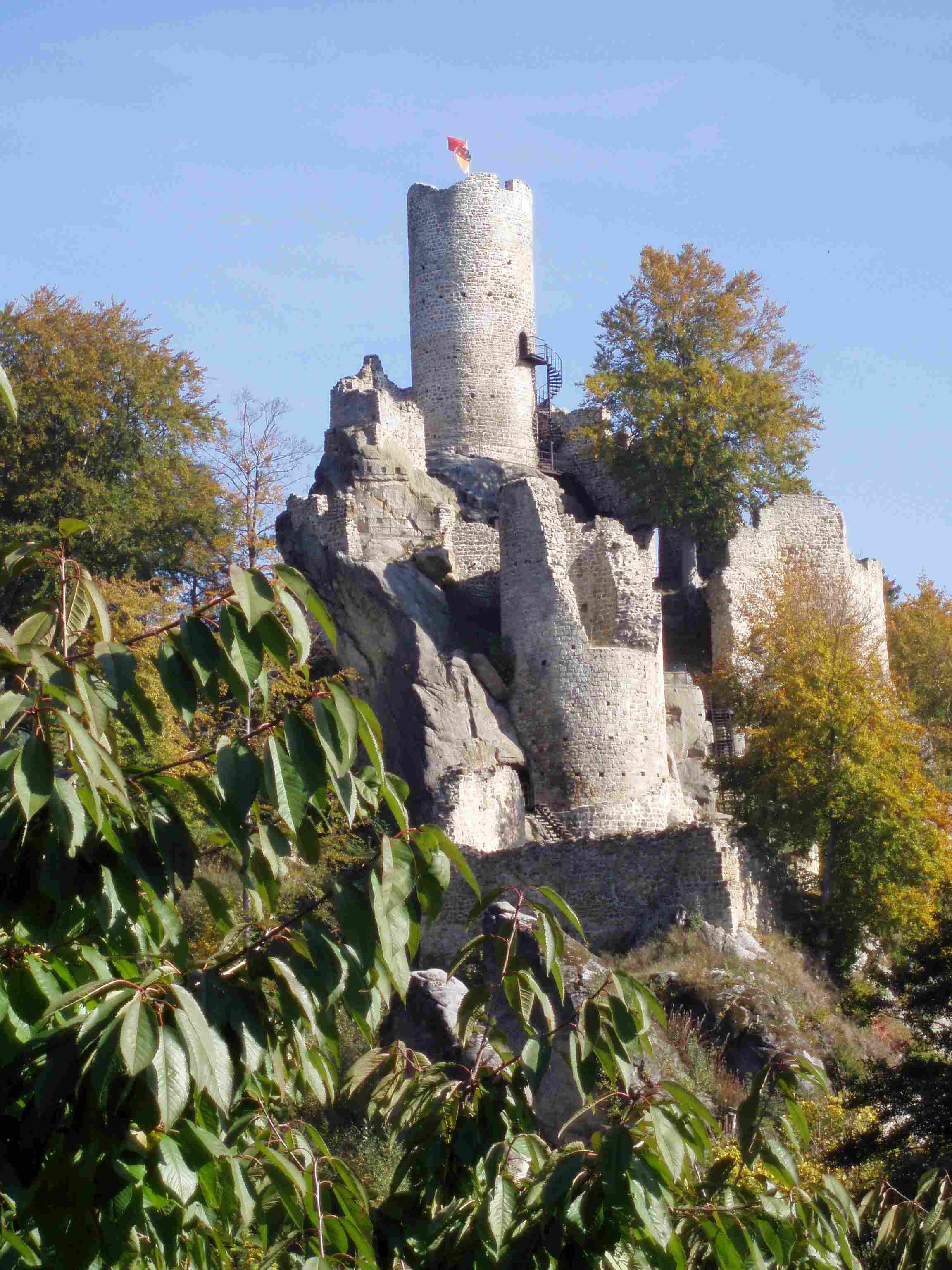
View of Frýdštejn Castle

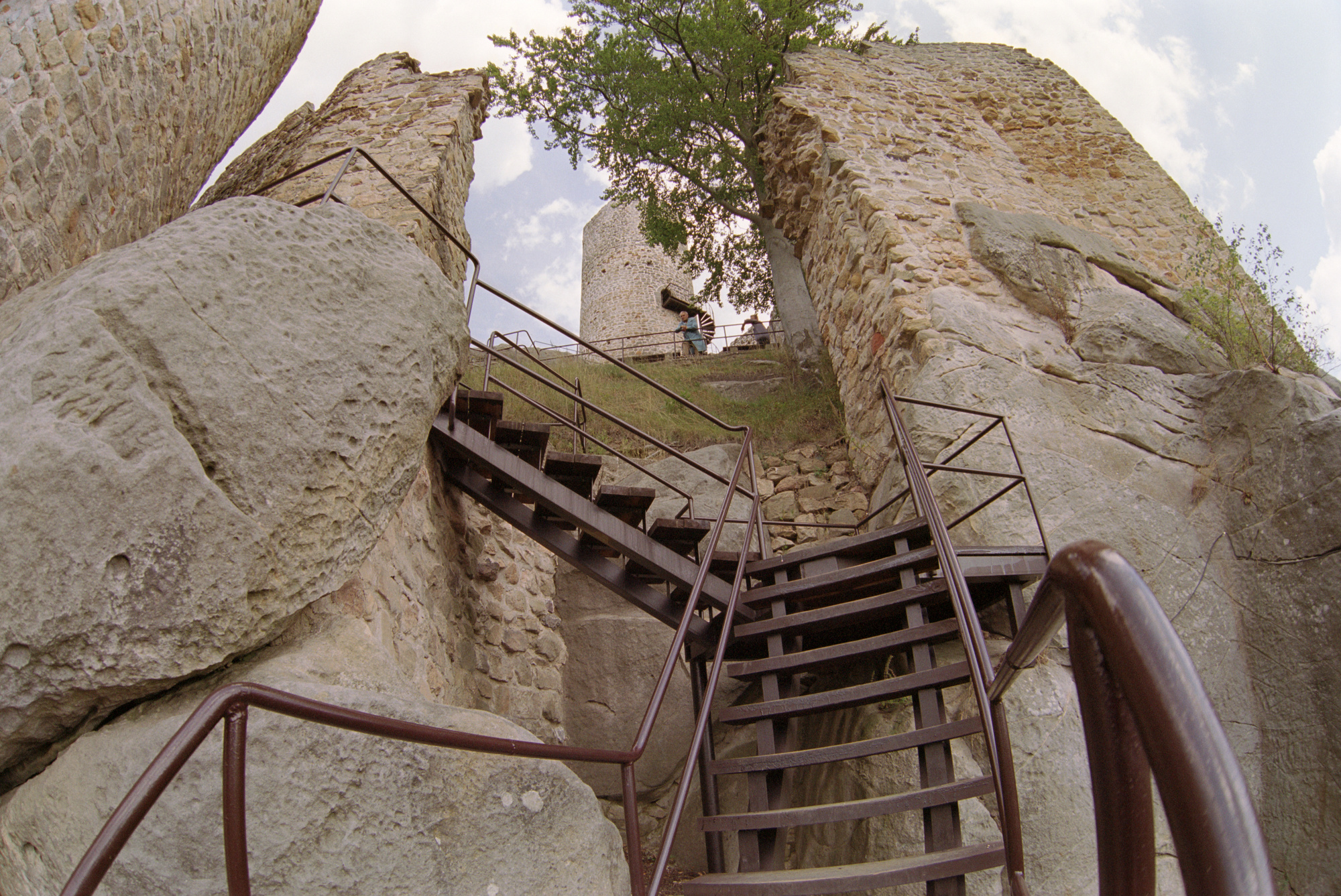
View from a low point up the castle

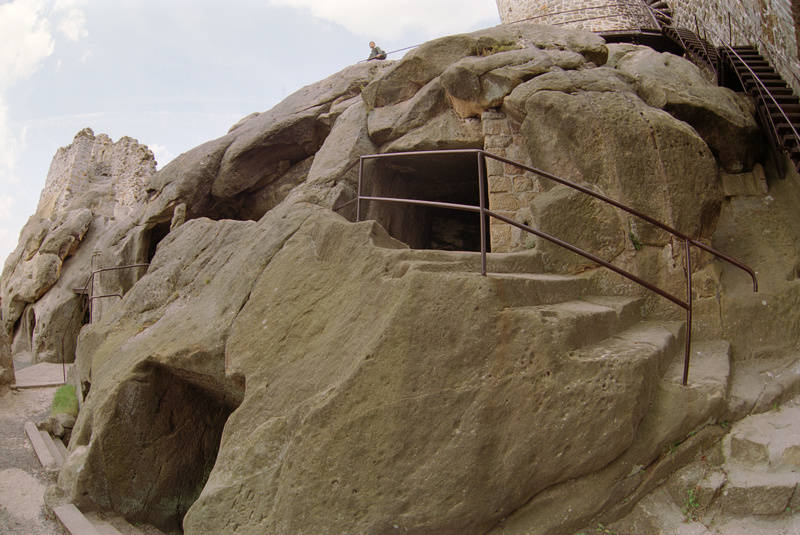
Rooms built into the sandstone-rocks

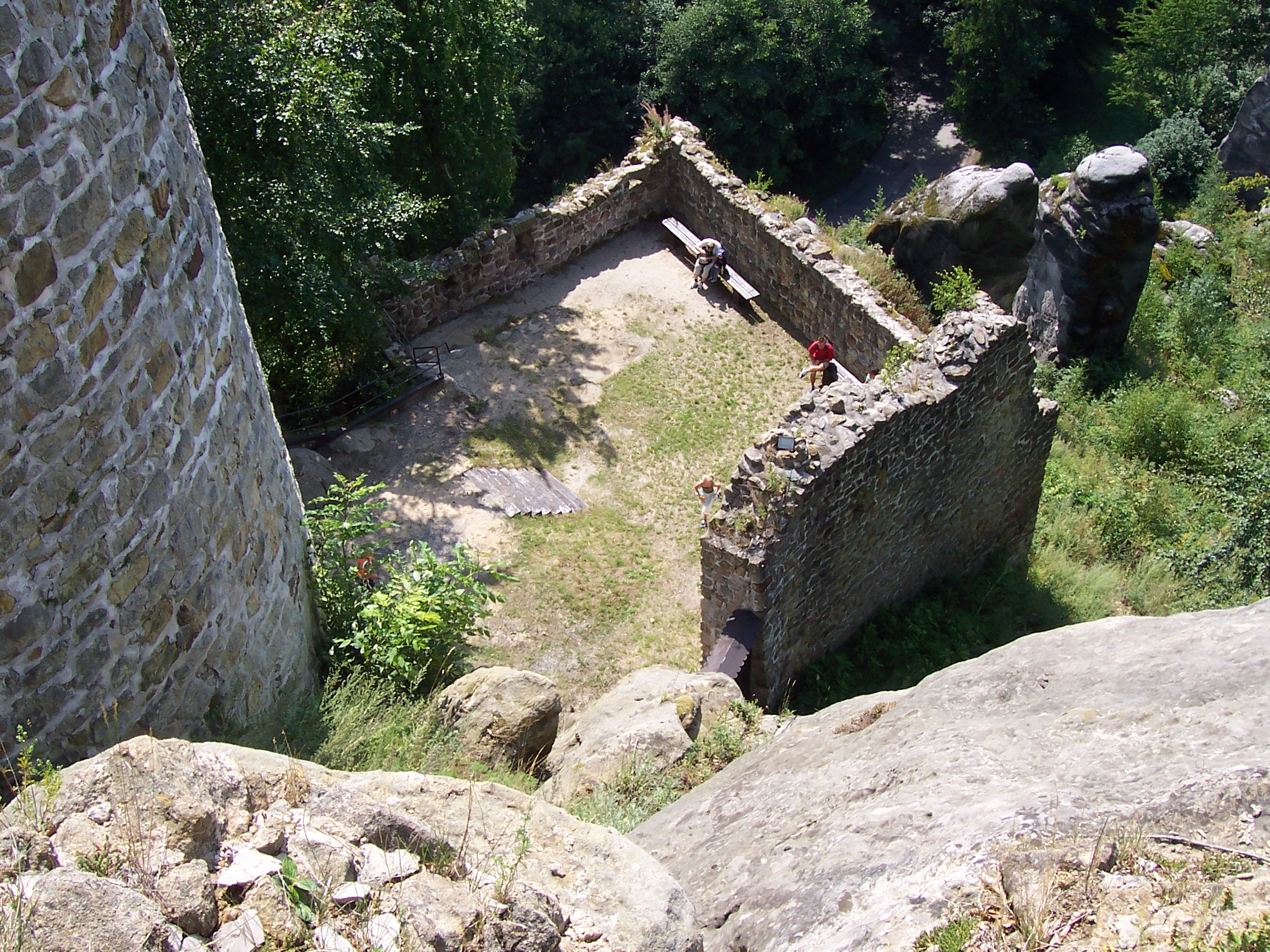
Lower courtyard

== See also ==
- List of castles in the Liberec Region
