= Hamrštejn =

Ruined castle in the Czech Republic

- Liberec District, Czech Republic
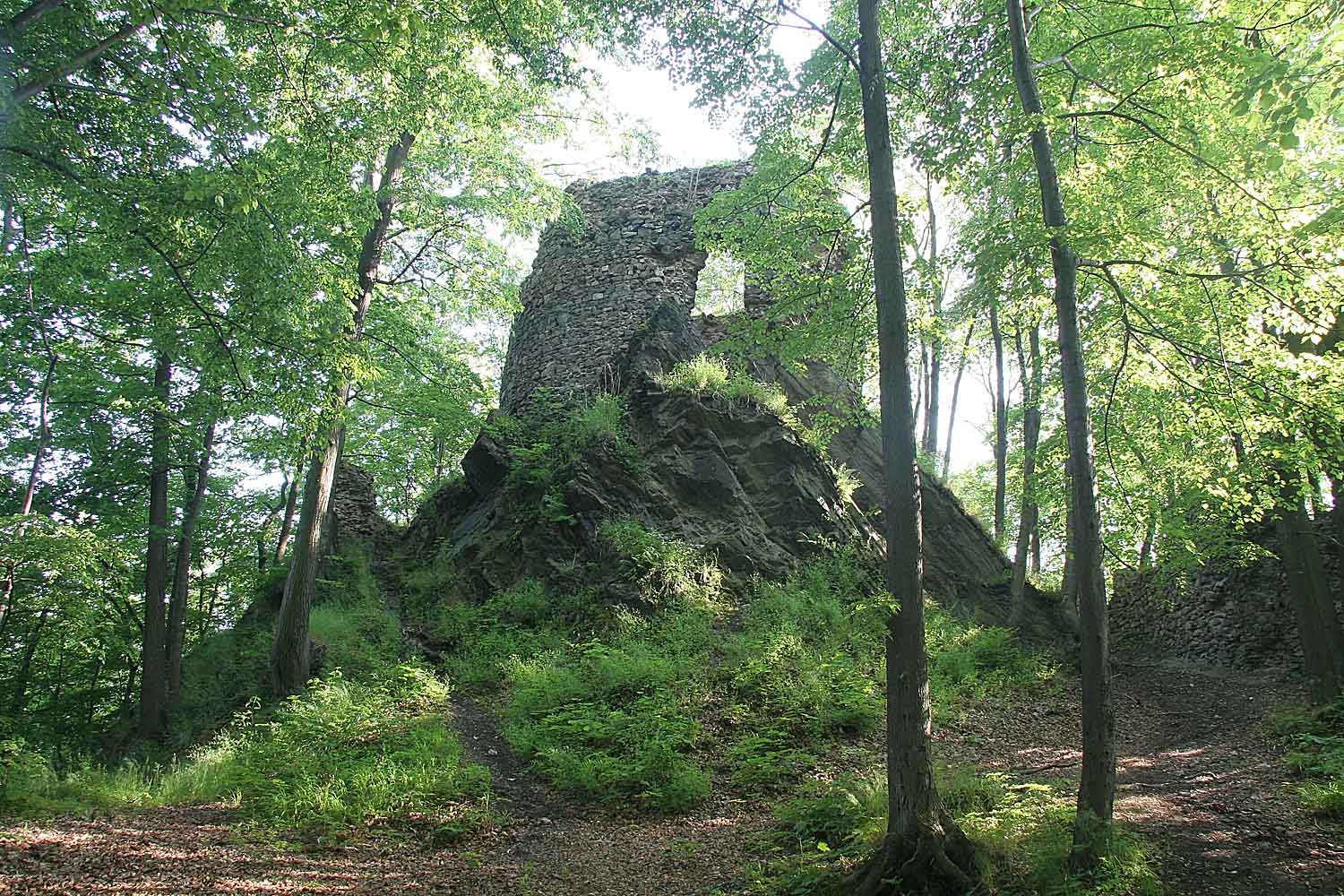
- One of the ruined towers

Site information
- Type: Castle
- Owner: Lesy České republiky
- Condition: Ruin

Location
- Coordinates: 50°47′9″N 14°58′13″E

Site history
- Built: First half of the 14th century
- Materials: Stone

Hamrštejn (German: Hammerstein) is a castle ruin located on the outskirts city of Liberec, Czech Republic. The stone castle was founded on a rocky outcrop, in a bend of the Lusatian Neisse. It was likely established in the 14th century and was abandoned by the mid-16th century.

== Location ==
Hamrštejn was built on rocky ground in a bend of the Lusatian Neisse. It lies in the territory of Liberec, in the district of Liberec XXXIII-Machnín. It is located within a conservation area of the same name that was established in the 1970s.

== History ==
It is uncertain precisely when the castle was established, but it was during the first half of the 14th century. The castle was used during the Hussite Wars (1419–1434) and was captured by the forces of Jan Čapek of Sány in 1433. Hamrštejn was deserted by 1558.

The castle has been protected as a cultural monument since 1958. The ownership of the site in the modern period was unclear, but from 2010 it was owned by Lesy České republiky. The resolution of the ownership led to conservation efforts in the 2010s.

== Layout ==
The castle is a rounded oblong shape, aligned roughly north-south and demarcated by a stone curtain wall which is in a fragmentary state and surrounded by a moat. The land enclosed by the wall is uneven, forming a saddle shape with two promontories. There were three main structures within the castle: a stone tower built on each of the promontories and a timber structure built against the curtain wall between the towers. The castle entrance was at the north end of the site. At least one of the towers and the timber structure were partly residential.

== See also ==
- Deganwy Castle – castle in Wales built spanning two promontories
- List of castles in the Liberec Region
