= Chotyně =

- Municipality
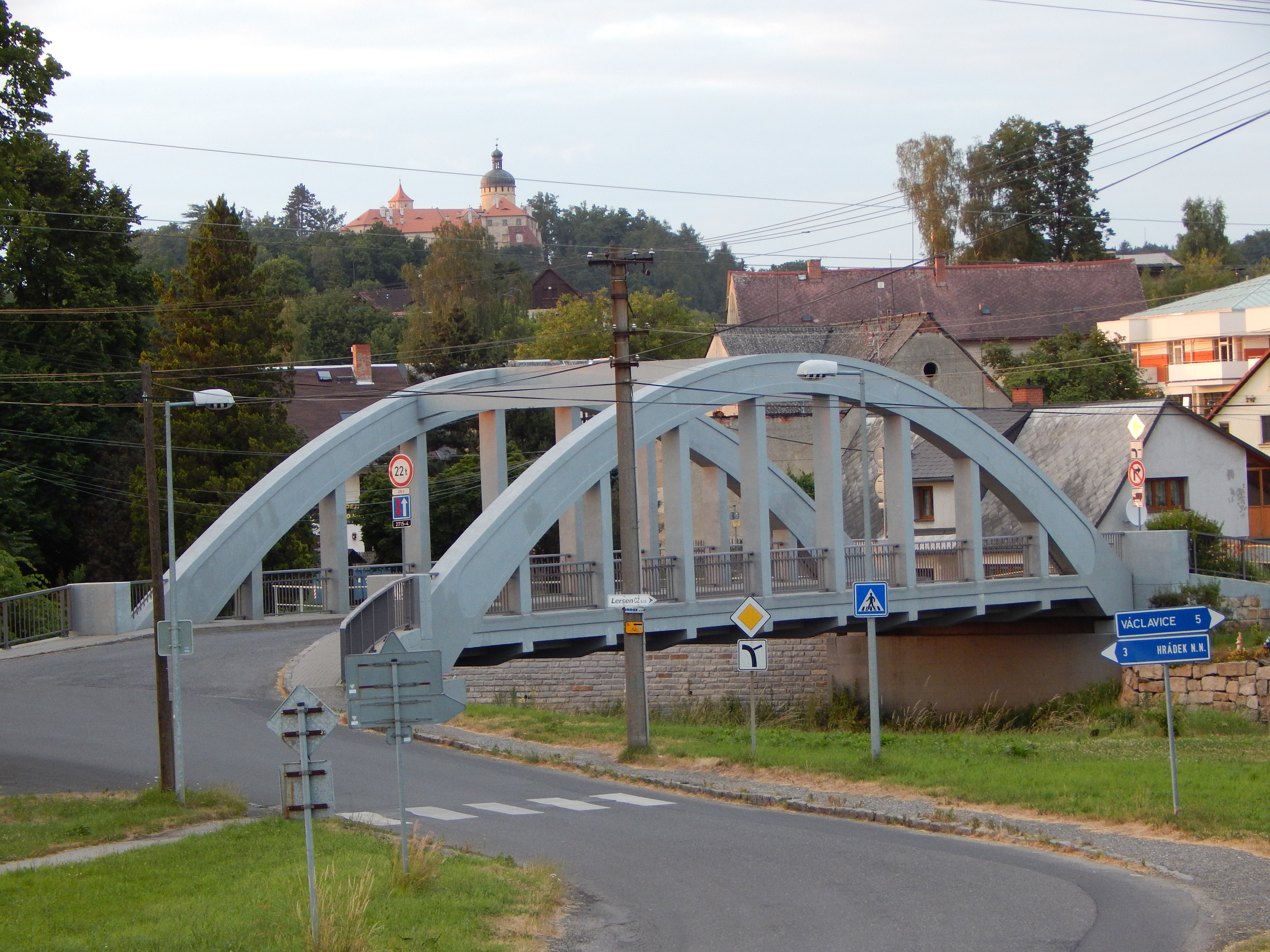
- Bridge over the Lusatian Neisse

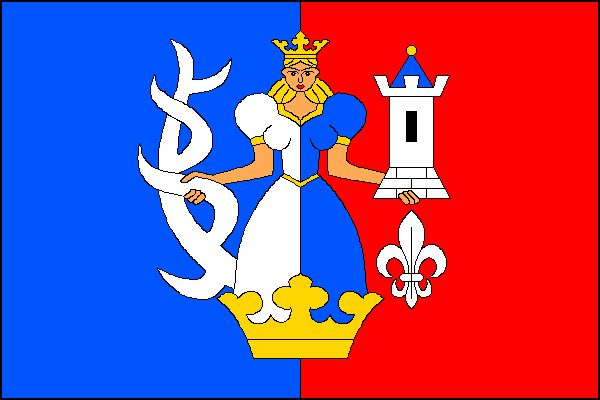
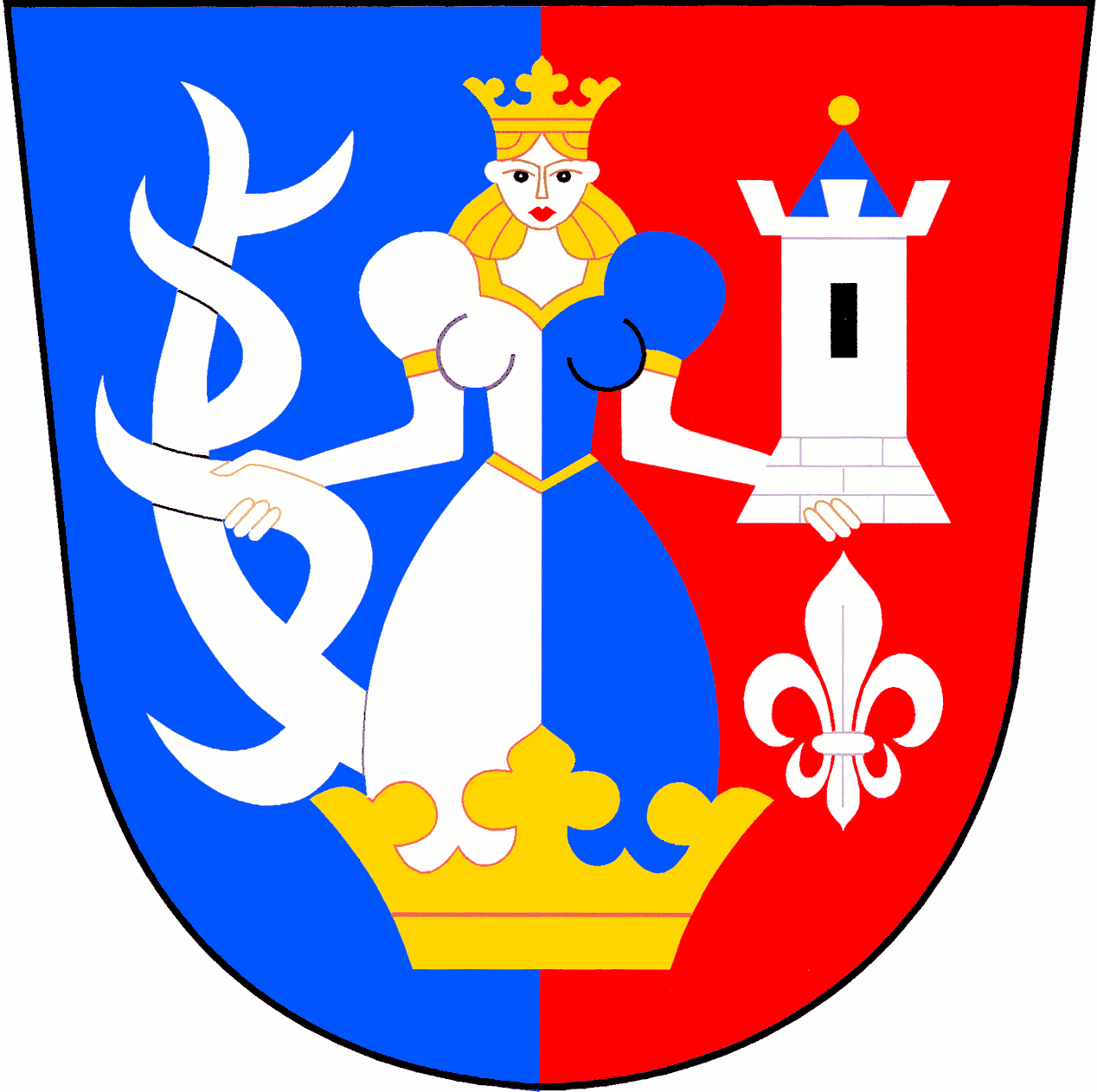
- Flag Coat of arms

- Location in the Czech Republic
- Coordinates: 50°50′11″N 14°52′9″E
- Country: Czech Republic
- Region: Liberec
- District: Liberec
- First mentioned: 1409

Area
  - Total: 9.04 km^{2} (3.49 sq mi)
- Elevation: 260 m (850 ft)

Population (2026-01-01)
  - Total: 1,092
  - Density: 121/km^{2} (313/sq mi)
- Time zone: UTC+1 (CET)
  - Summer (DST): UTC+2 (CEST)
- Postal code: 463 34
- Website: www.chotyne.cz

Chotyně (German: Ketten) is a municipality and village in Liberec District in the Liberec Region of the Czech Republic. It has about 1,100 inhabitants. It is known for the Grabštejn Castle, which is protected as a national cultural monument.

== Administrative division ==
Chotyně consists of two municipal parts (in brackets population according to the 2021 census):

- Chotyně (880)
- Grabštejn (107)

== Etymology ==
The name is probably of Slavic origin. It could have originated from the personal name Chot or Chotěn.

== Geography ==
Chotyně is located about 14 kilometres (9 mi) northwest of Liberec. It lies in the Zittau Basin. The highest point is at 395 m (1,296 ft) above sea level. The Lusatian Neisse River flows through the municipality.

== History ==
The first written mention of Chotyně is from 1409.

== Demographics ==
Historical population

| Year | Pop. | ±% |
|---|---|---|
| 1869 | 940 | — |
| 1880 | 1,035 | +10.1% |
| 1890 | 1,150 | +11.1% |
| 1900 | 1,548 | +34.6% |
| 1910 | 1,594 | +3.0% |

| Year | Pop. | ±% |
|---|---|---|
| 1921 | 1,345 | −15.6% |
| 1930 | 1,447 | +7.6% |
| 1950 | 901 | −37.7% |
| 1961 | 939 | +4.2% |
| 1970 | 892 | −5.0% |

| Year | Pop. | ±% |
|---|---|---|
| 1980 | 925 | +3.7% |
| 1991 | 799 | −13.6% |
| 2001 | 836 | +4.6% |
| 2011 | 863 | +3.2% |
| 2021 | 987 | +14.4% |

Source: Censuses

== Transport ==
The I/35 road from Liberec to the Czech–German border runs through the municipality.

Chotyně is located on a railway line heading from Liberec to Zittau and continuing to Varnsdorf.

== Sights ==
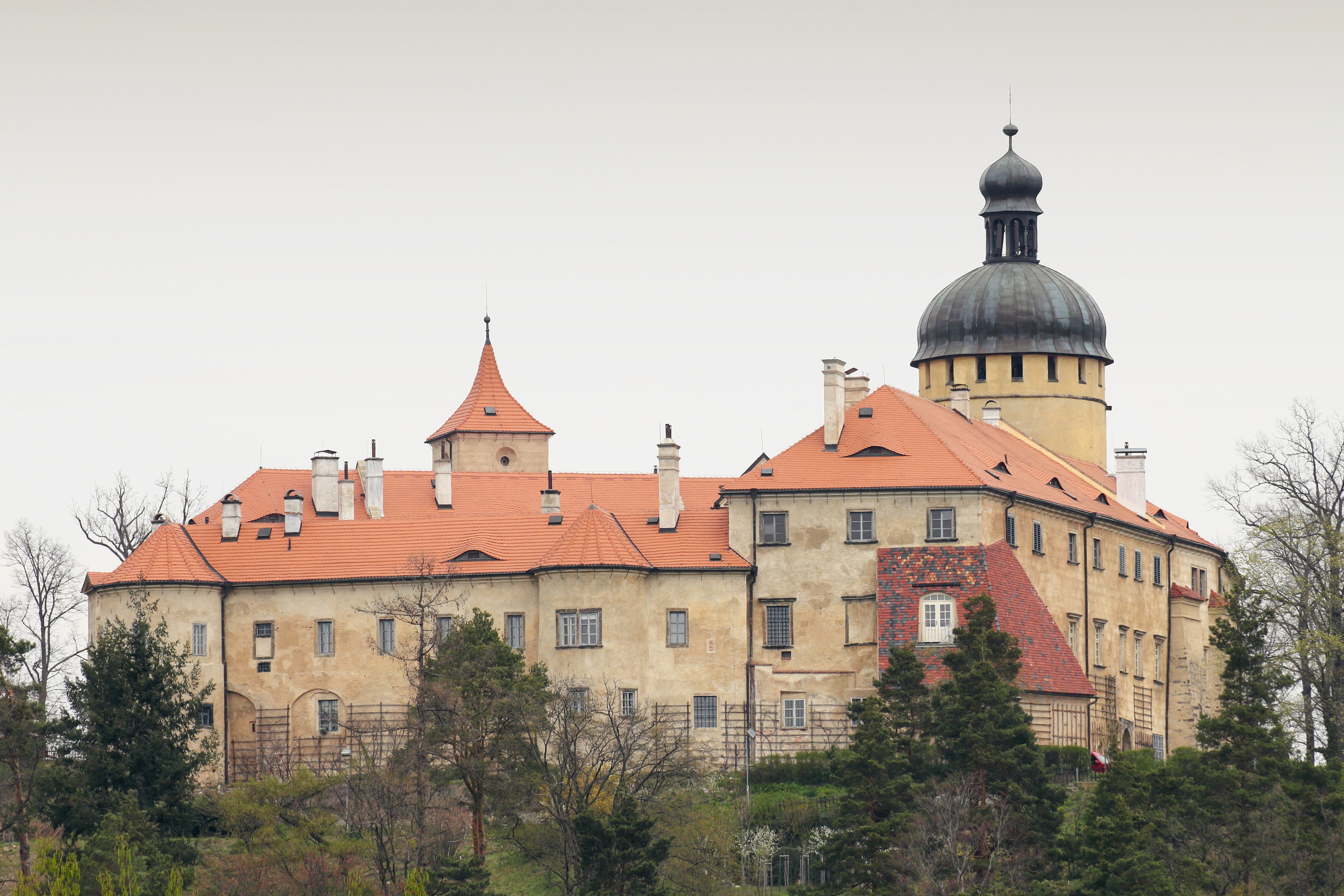
Grabštejn Castle

The main landmark is the Grabštejn Castle. It was originally a Gothic castle, rebuilt in the Renaissance style. It belongs among the most important monuments in the region and is protected as a national cultural monument. Today the castle is owned by the state and offers guided tours.
