= Deganwy Castle =

Castle in Conwy, Wales

- Conwy, North Wales
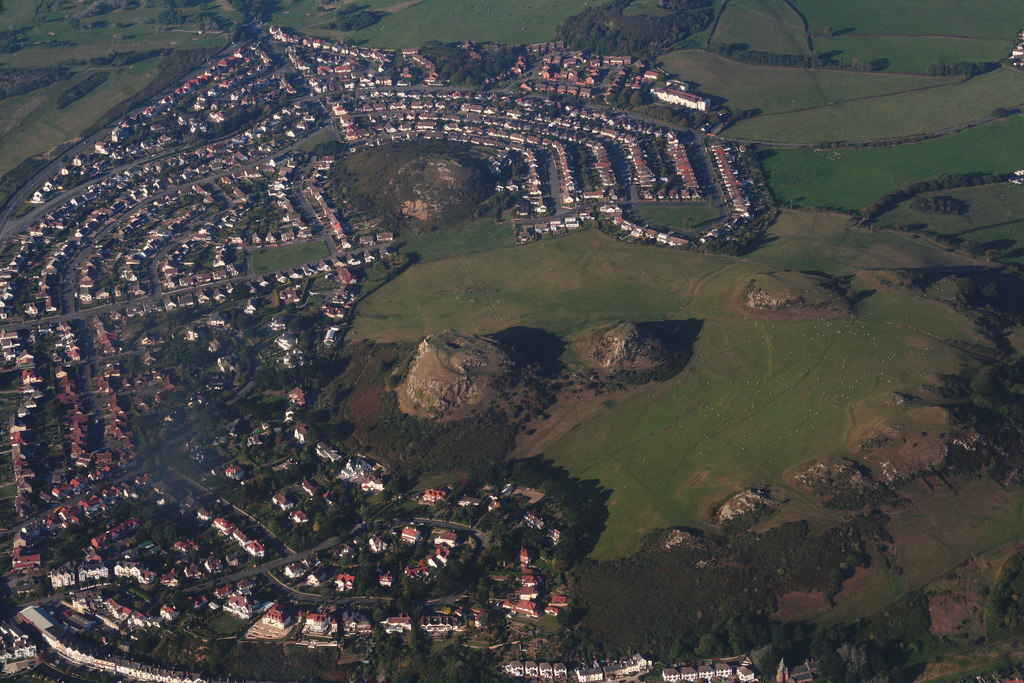
- An aerial view of the castle from the south

Site information
- Type: Castle
- Condition: Earthworks remain

Location
- Deganwy Castle shown within Conwy
- Location within Conwy
- Coordinates: 53.2975°N 3.8290°W
- Grid reference: grid reference SH782794

Site history
- Materials: Stone

Deganwy Castle (Medieval Latin: Arx Deganhui; Middle Welsh: Caer Ddegannwy; Modern Welsh: Castell Degannwy) was an early stronghold of Gwynedd in Deganwy, at the mouth of the River Conwy, now in Conwy county borough, north Wales. It sits at an elevation of 110 m (361 ft) on a volcanic plug in an area of limestone known as the Vardre (Welsh: Y Fardre).

== Before the castle ==
The Early Middle Ages fortress, which is now little more than ditches and mounds, was constructed of wood on a massive rock outcrop in what is now the suburbs of Llandudno. Traditionally, it was the headquarters of Maelgwn Gwynedd, King of Gwynedd (fl. c. 520–547). There are several places nearby associated with him, including a hill called Bryn Maelgwyn. A hoard of 204 silver Cnut pennies was found on Bryn Maelgwyn in July 1979.

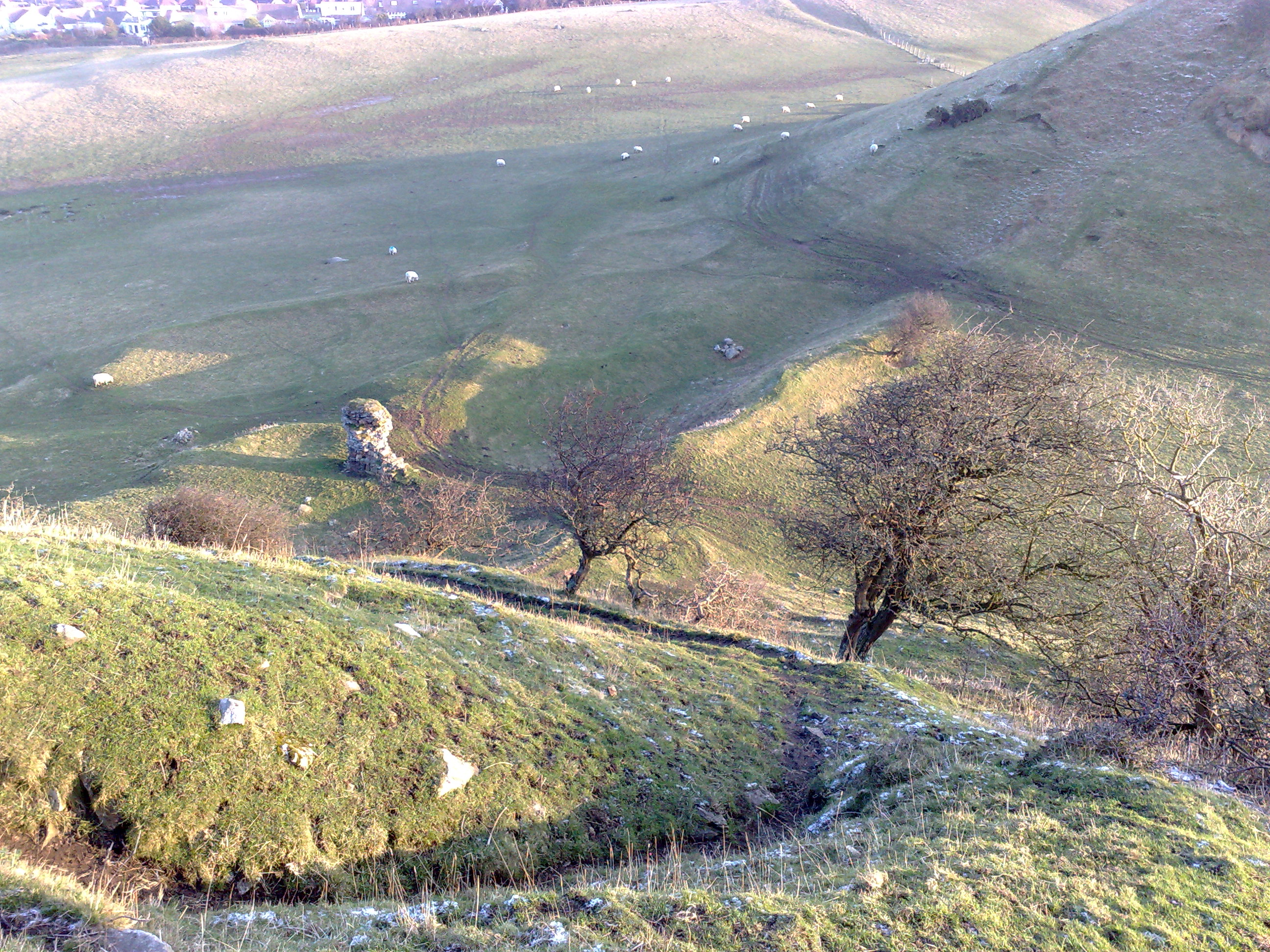
Ruins and features of the main entrance to Deganwy Castle seen from one of the "towers"

Deganwy was probably first occupied during the Roman period, but was popular in the years following their departure because it was safe from Irish raids. The area beneath the rocky stronghold may have been the site of a settlement of serfs. The stronghold was burned down in 812 when it was struck by lightning.

== Castle ==
In the second half of the 11th century, north Wales was part of the Kingdom of Gwynedd. After the Norman invasion of England in 1066, William the Conqueror installed his followers as earls in the English counties bordering Wales, each making advances into Wales at various points. Hugh d'Avranches was made Earl of Chester, and his nephew Robert led a campaign in north Wales. This resulted in Robert establishing a castle at Rhuddlan, and according to Orderic Vitalis at Degannwy. This would have been 1073 at the earliest. The precise location of the castle on the hilltop and its layout are uncertain. Robert was killed in 1093, and the following year the Welsh pushed the Normans out of Gwynedd. The history of the castle in the 12th century is unknown.

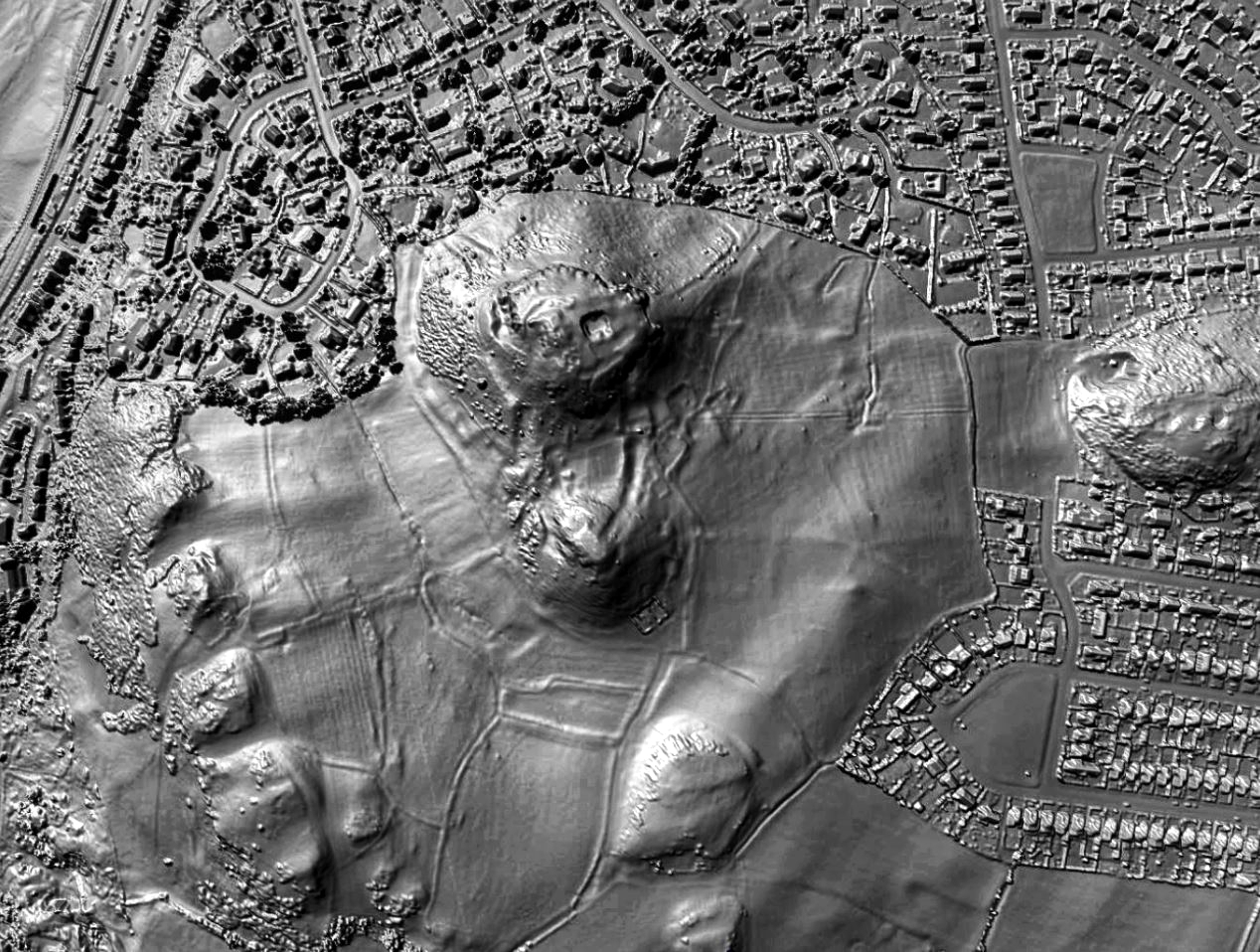
A lidar view of Deganwy Castle

By the 13th century, Deganwy was fortified by the Prince of Wales Llywelyn ab Iorwerth. It was captured by the Earl of Chester in 1210, but recaptured shortly afterward by Llywelyn, who had it refortified in stone. The Brut y Tywysogion recorded that "the earl of Chester again built the castle of Degannwy, which Llywelyn ap Iorwerth had destroyed for fear of the king."

Ownership of the castle descended to his son, Dafydd ap Llywelyn; in 1241 Dafydd had the castle destroyed ahead of an English advance into the region. The destruction is recorded in the Annales Cambriae. King Henry III of England subsequently took control of the castle and embarked on an extensive building programme; the building work cost more than £2,200. The castle was destroyed by Llywelyn ap Gruffudd, Prince of Wales in 1263. In 1283, King Edward I of England had Conwy Castle constructed just across the estuary, but left Deganwy Castle in ruins.

== Excavation and investigation ==
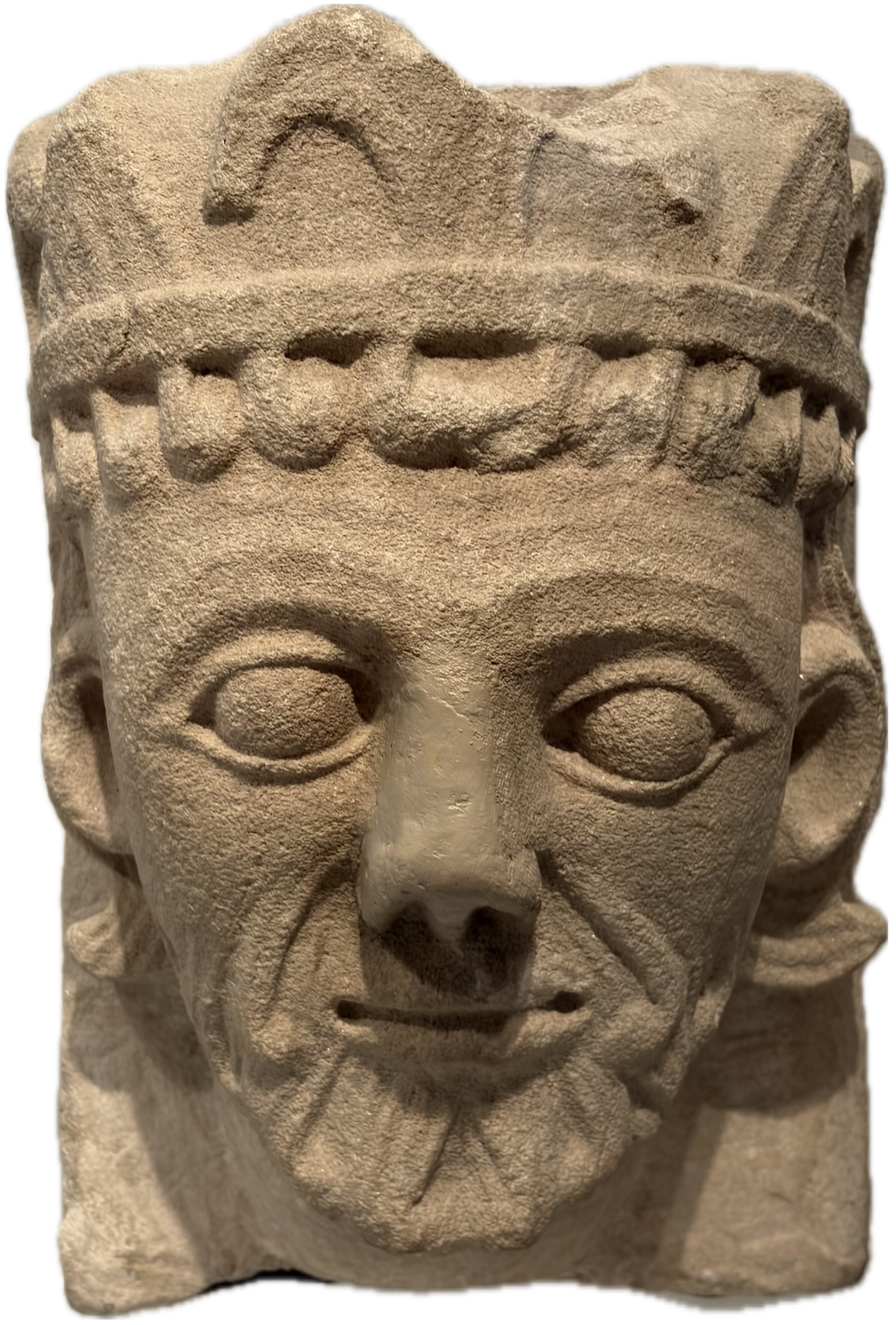
A sculpted head discovered at Deganwy which may depict Llywelyn ab Iorwerth.

Between 1961 and 1966 Leslie Alcock led excavations at Deganwy Castle. The programme of work was planned by the University of Wales and funded by the Board of Celtic Studies and the Caernarvonshire Historical Society.

During the excavations a dozen sherds of early medieval pottery which had been imported from the Mediterranean were discovered, indicating the far-reaching contacts of Gwynedd's royal dynasty.

In 2009, the Gwynedd Archaeological Trust carried out a geophysical survey of the bailey between the two hills and land immediately north and south of the castle.

== Gallery ==
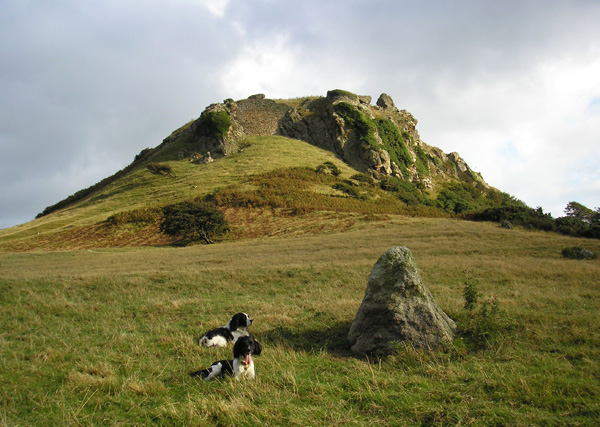
The east end of the saddle at the summit of the hill where Mansell's Tower used to stand

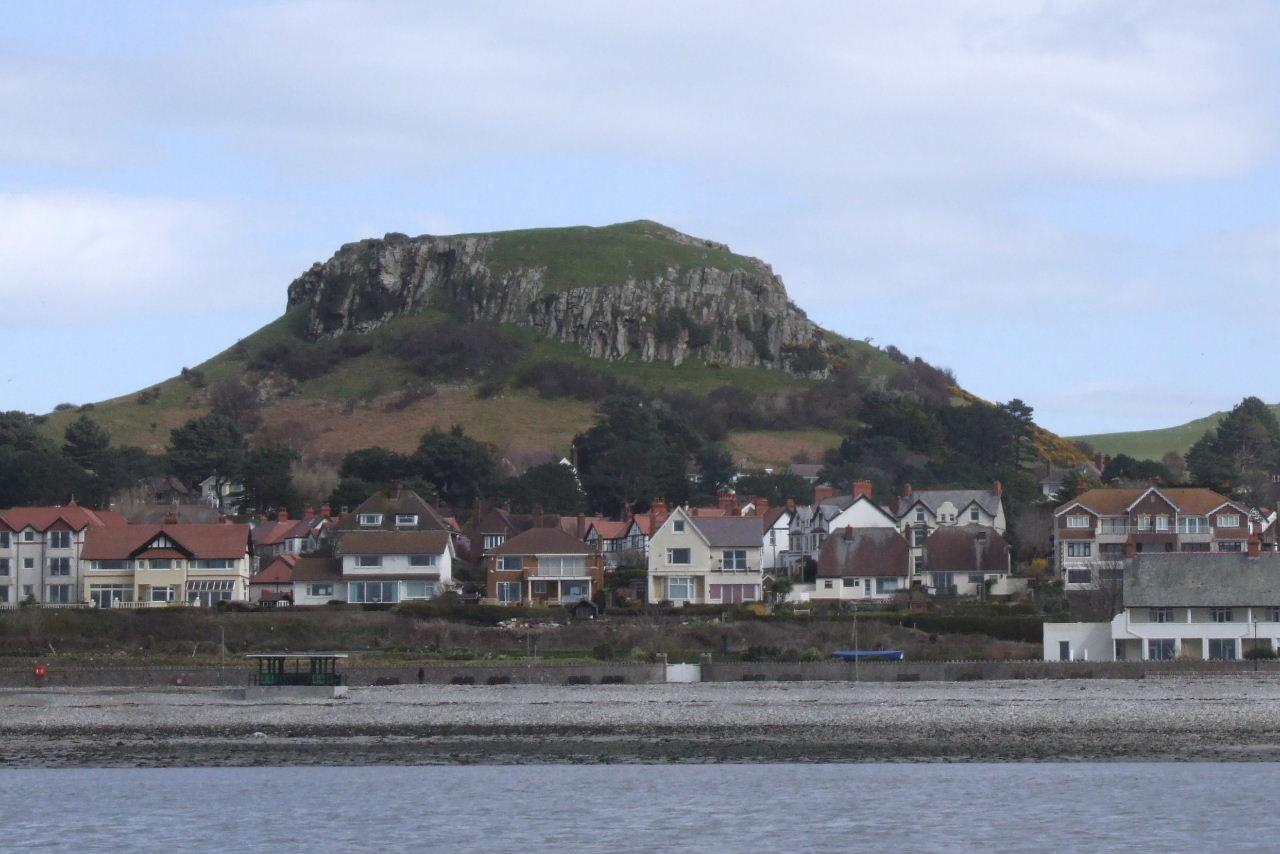
The castle seen from the west across the River Conwy

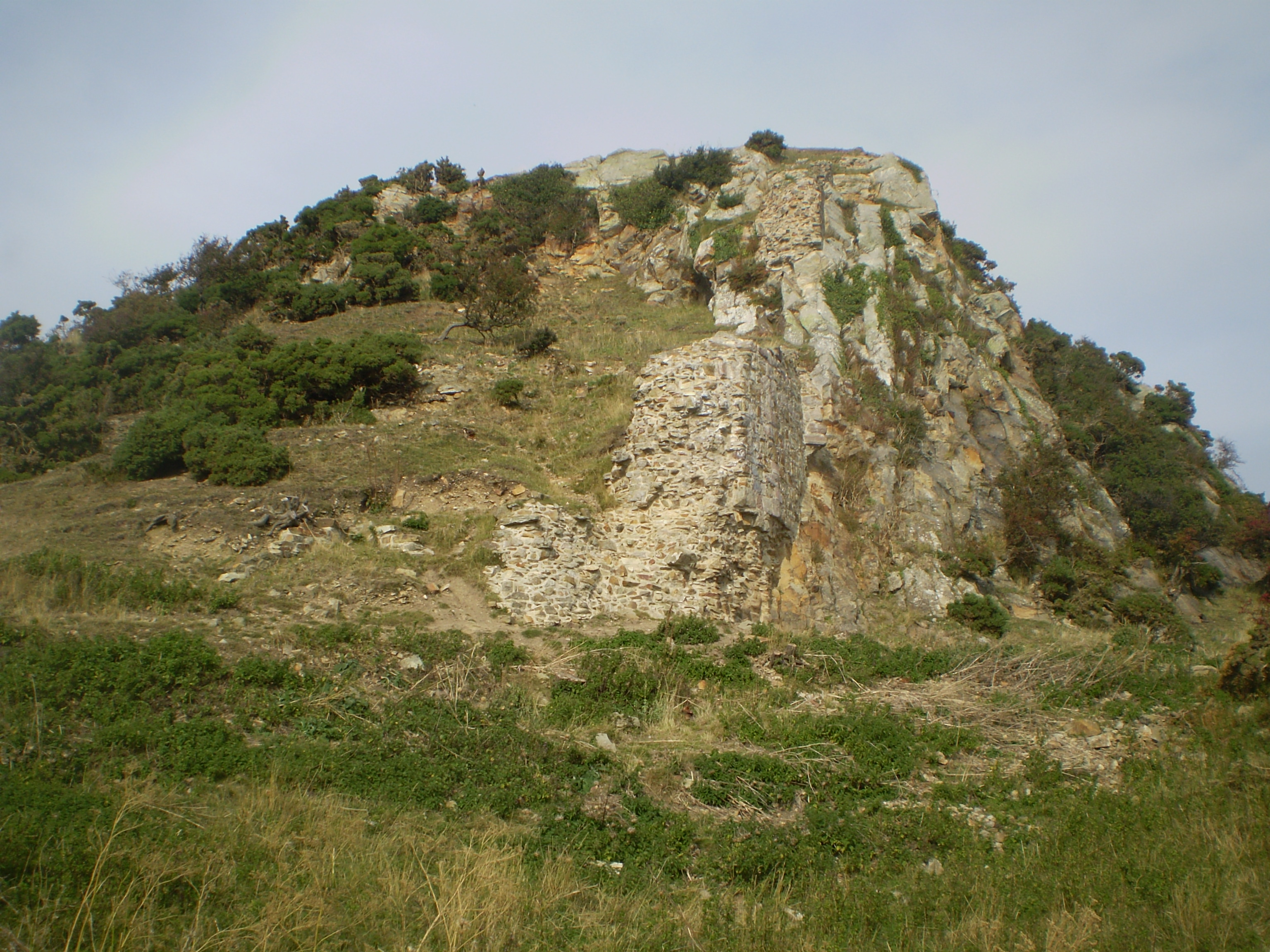

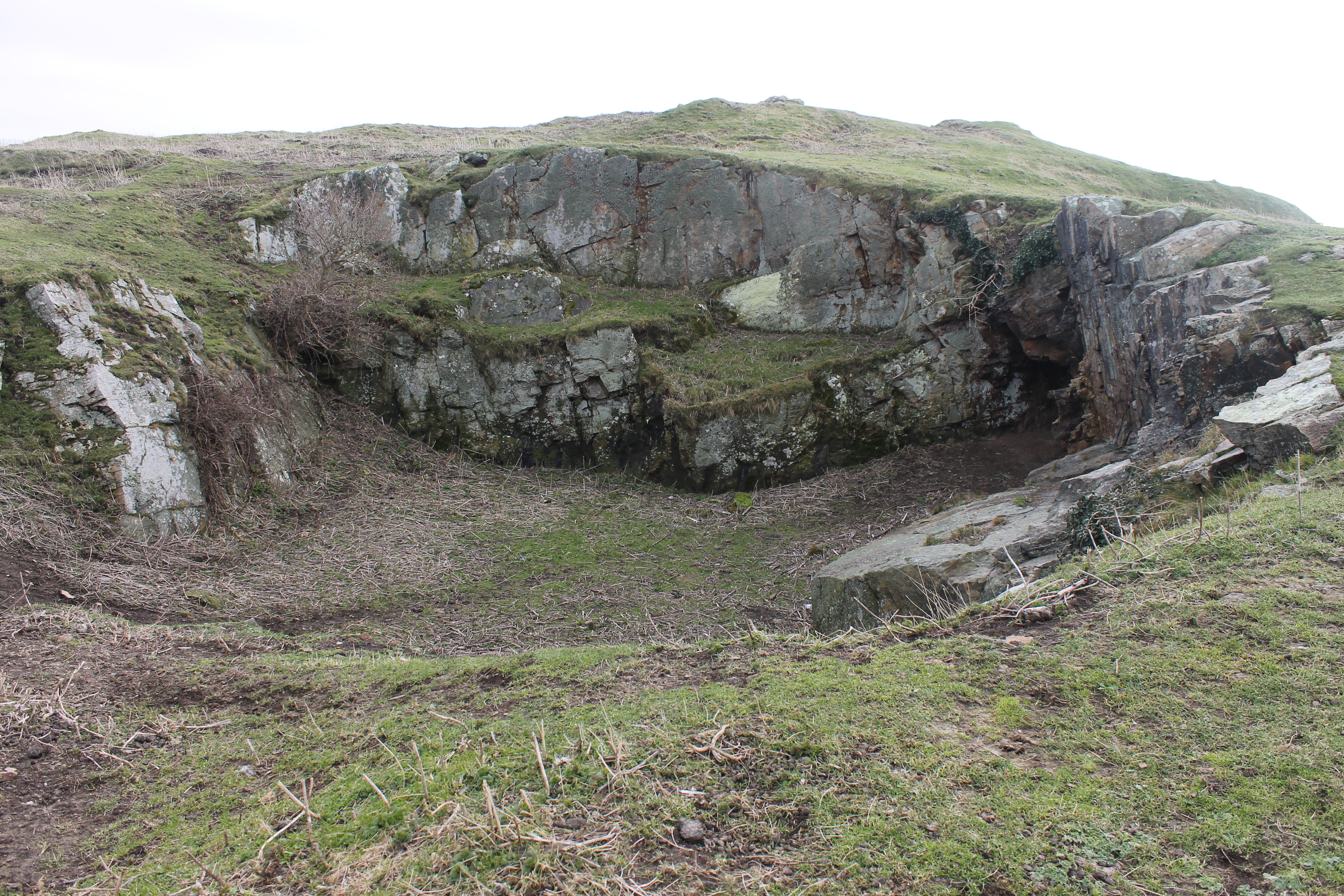

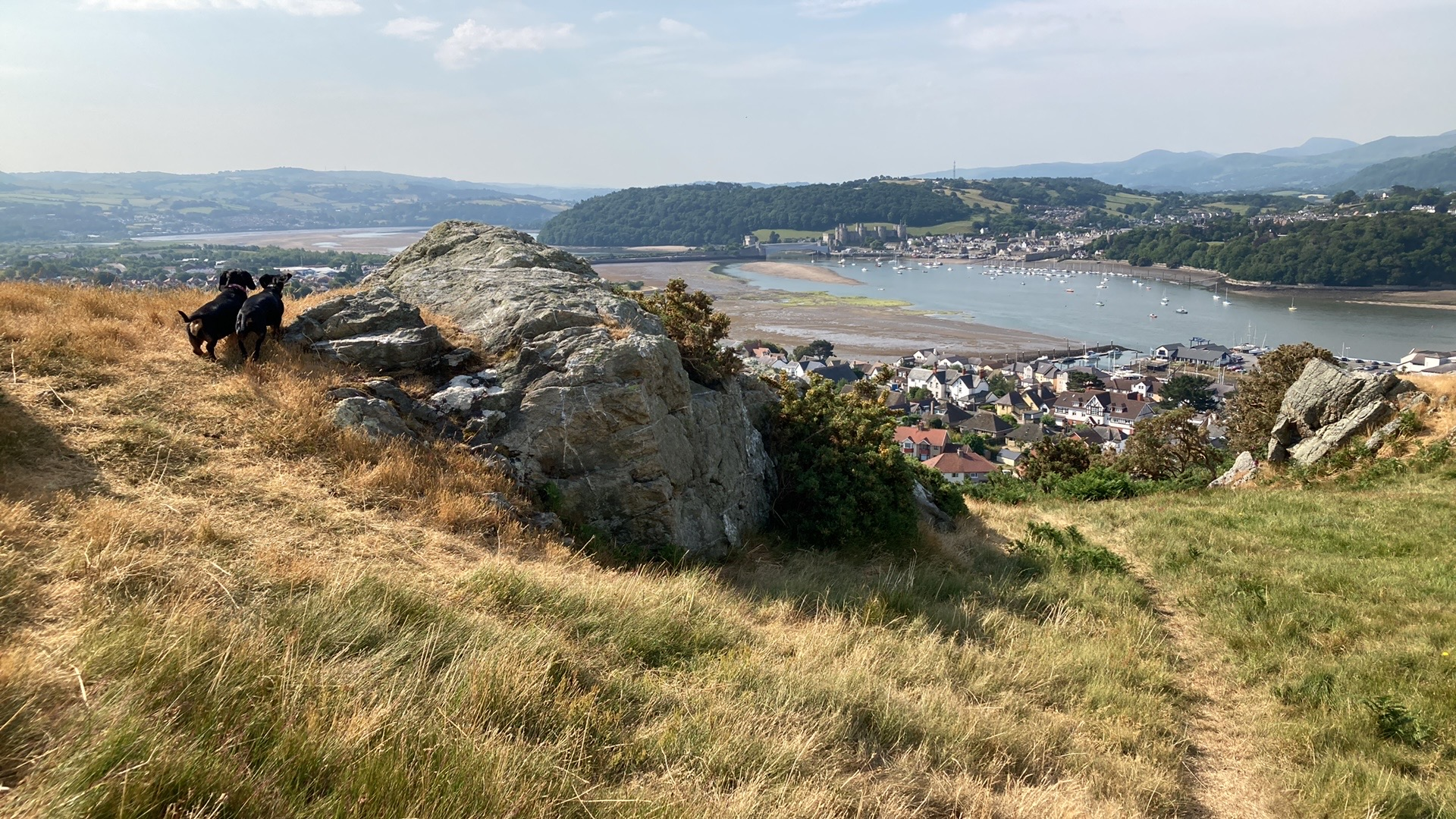
The view south towards Conwy Castle

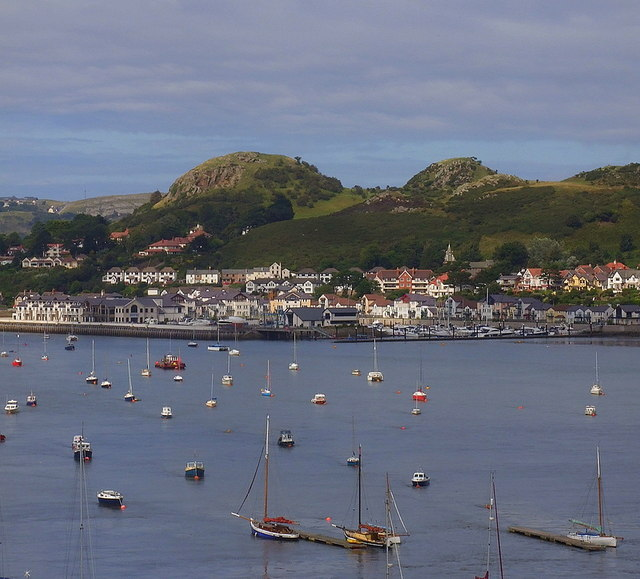
The castle as seen from Conwy Castle

== See also ==
- Castles in Great Britain and Ireland
- List of castles in Wales
- Dyserth Castle
- Hamrštejn, a 14th-century castle in the Czech Republic build spanning two promontories
