= Grabštejn =

- Chotyně, Liberec Region in the Czech Republic
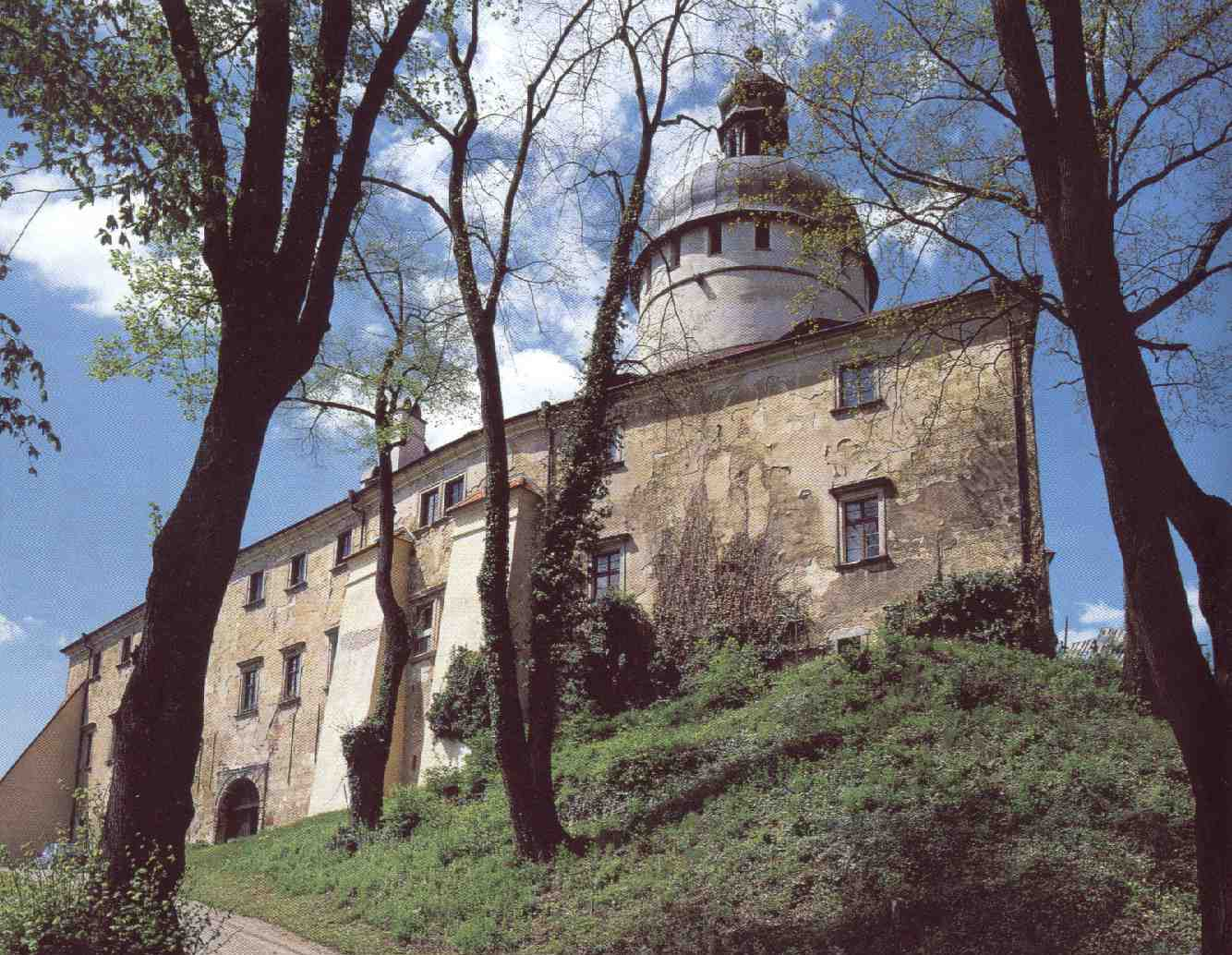
- Grabštejn Castle

Site information
- Type: Castle

Location
- Location in the Czech Republic
- Coordinates: 50°50′46.05″N 14°52′34.28″E

Site history
- Built: 13th century

Grabštejn (German: Grafenstein) is a castle in Chotyně in the Liberec Region of the Czech Republic. Originally a Gothic castle, it was rebuilt in the Renaissance style and later modified in the late Baroque and late Neoclassical styles. It belongs among the most important monuments of the Liberec Region.

== History ==
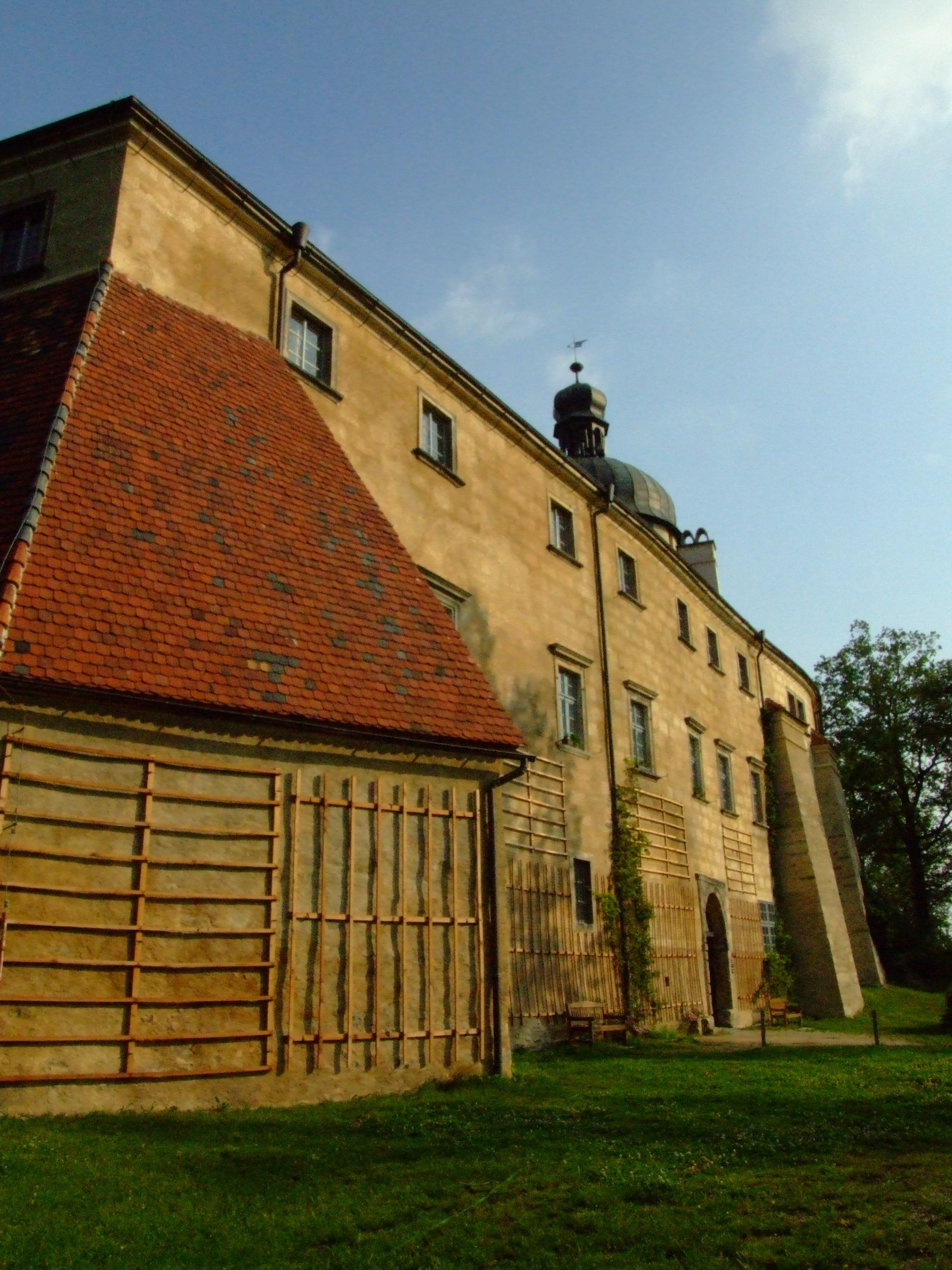
Entrance gate

The original Gothic castle of Grafenstein was founded in the 13th century. In 1562, it was bought by Crown Chancellor Georg Mehl von Strelitz. Between 1566 and 1586, he had rebuilt the castle in the Renaissance style and thus turned it into a representative castle.

Georg Mehl also had a steward's house built below the castle, which was around the year 1830 rebuilt in the Neoclassical style. Shortly before that – around 1818 – Christian of Clam-Gallas had built the New Castle near the Old Castle. The new building was surrounded by a large garden with a number of valuable plants. The Old Castle has preserved its original Renaissance appearance despite a fire which damaged its upper floors in 1843.

The House of Clam-Gallas owned Grabštejn from 1704 until it was confiscated in 1945. After World War II, the castle was open to the public, but in 1953, the whole castle complex was taken over by the Ministry of Defence. The Old Castle's condition significantly deteriorated after the army left in the late 1980s.

Today the castle is owned by the state and offers guided tours. Repairs and restorations began in 1989. Nowadays, Grabštejn is one of the best restored monuments of great importance in the Czech Republic. The castle was opened to the public again in 1993. The tower offers a marvellous view of the three-border-triangle, the castle's northern wing, and the vault. The most touristically attractive part of the castle interior is the St. Barbara chapel decorated with Renaissance fresco paintings from the 16th century. All parts of the ceiling and walls are ornamented in with interlaced figural, animal, and heraldic motifs.

Grabštejn Castle belongs among the most important monuments in the Liberec Region. Since 2008, it has been protected as a national cultural monument.

== See also ==
- List of castles in the Liberec Region

== Gallery ==
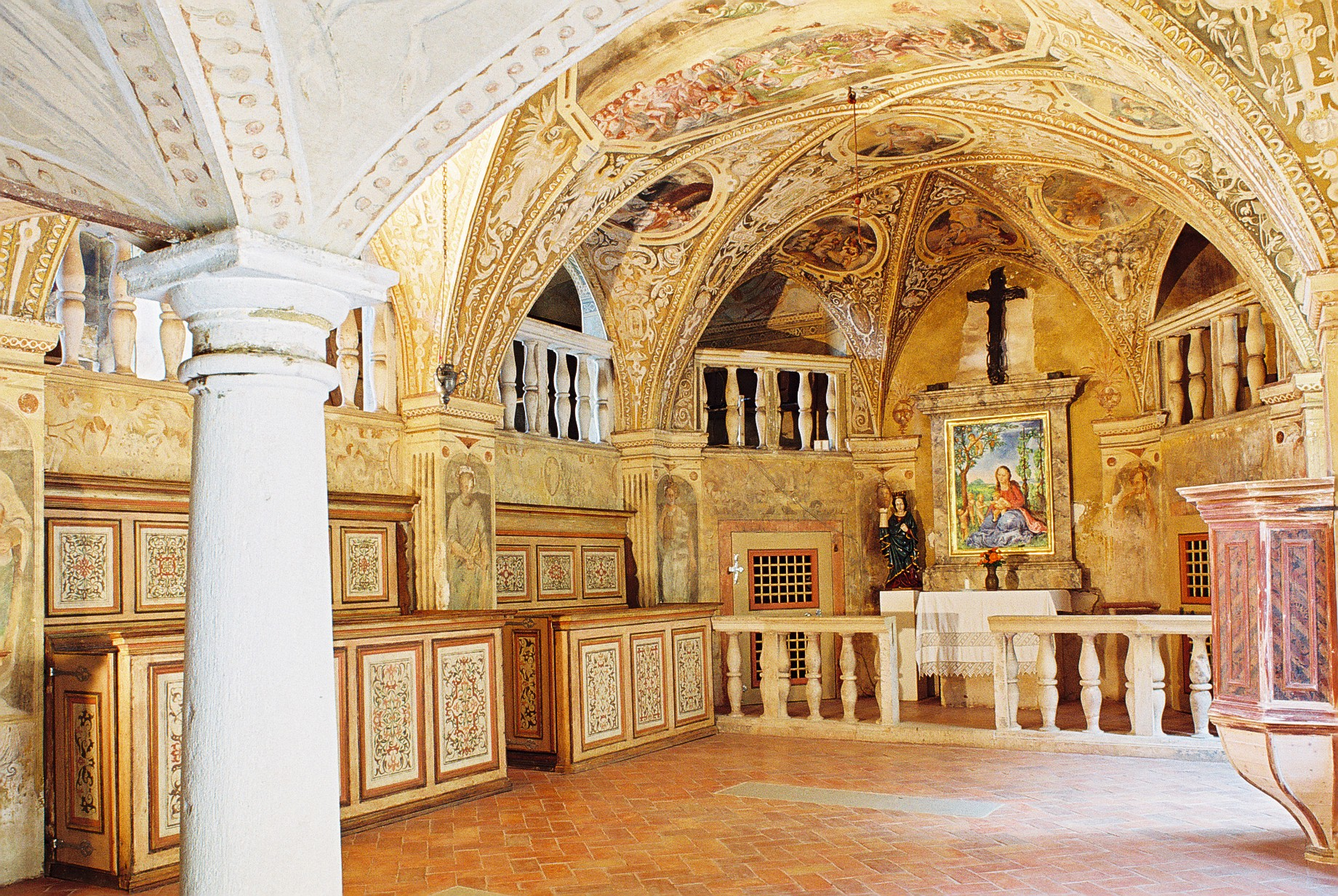
St. Barbara chapel

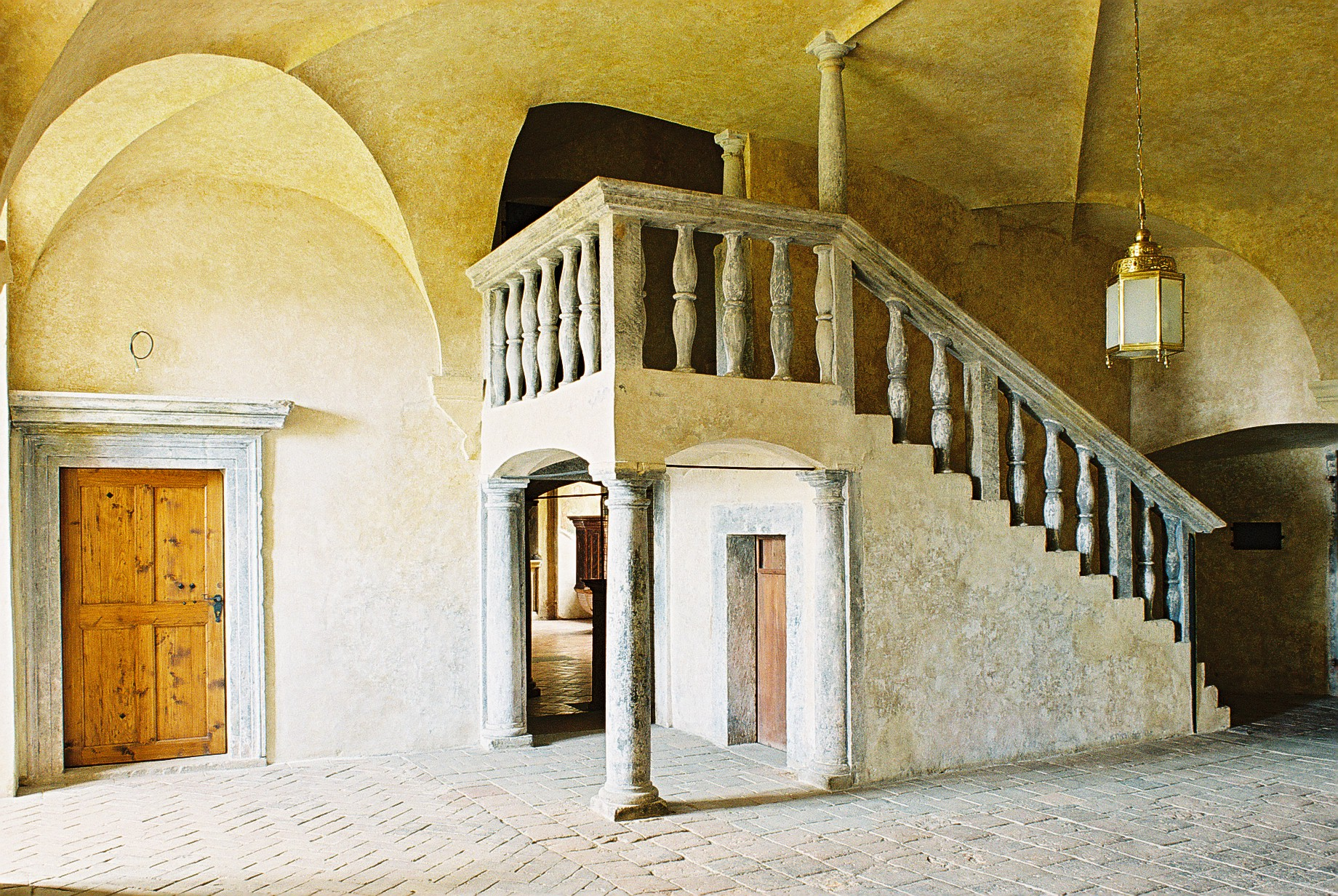
Entrance hall

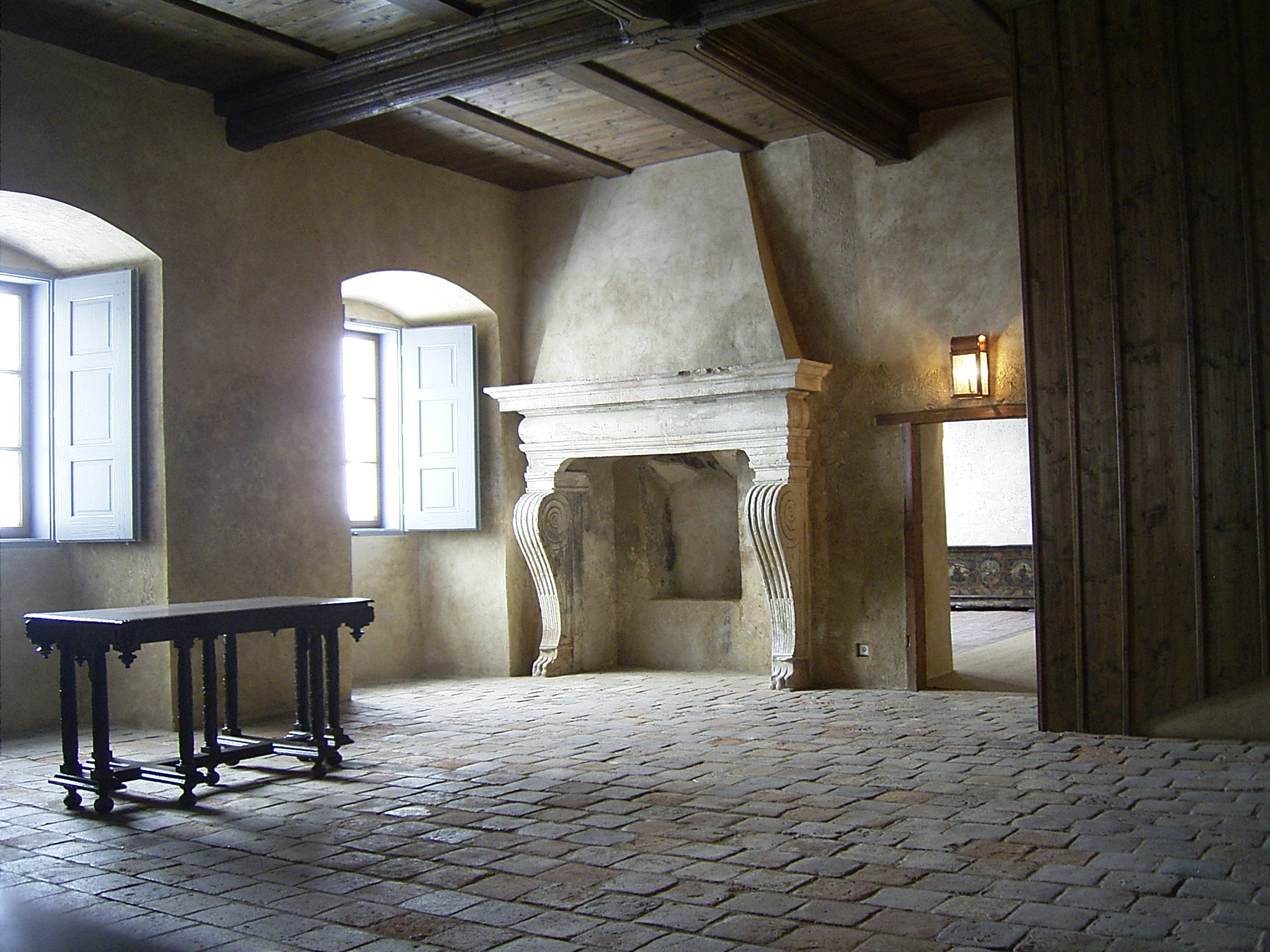
Room with fireplace

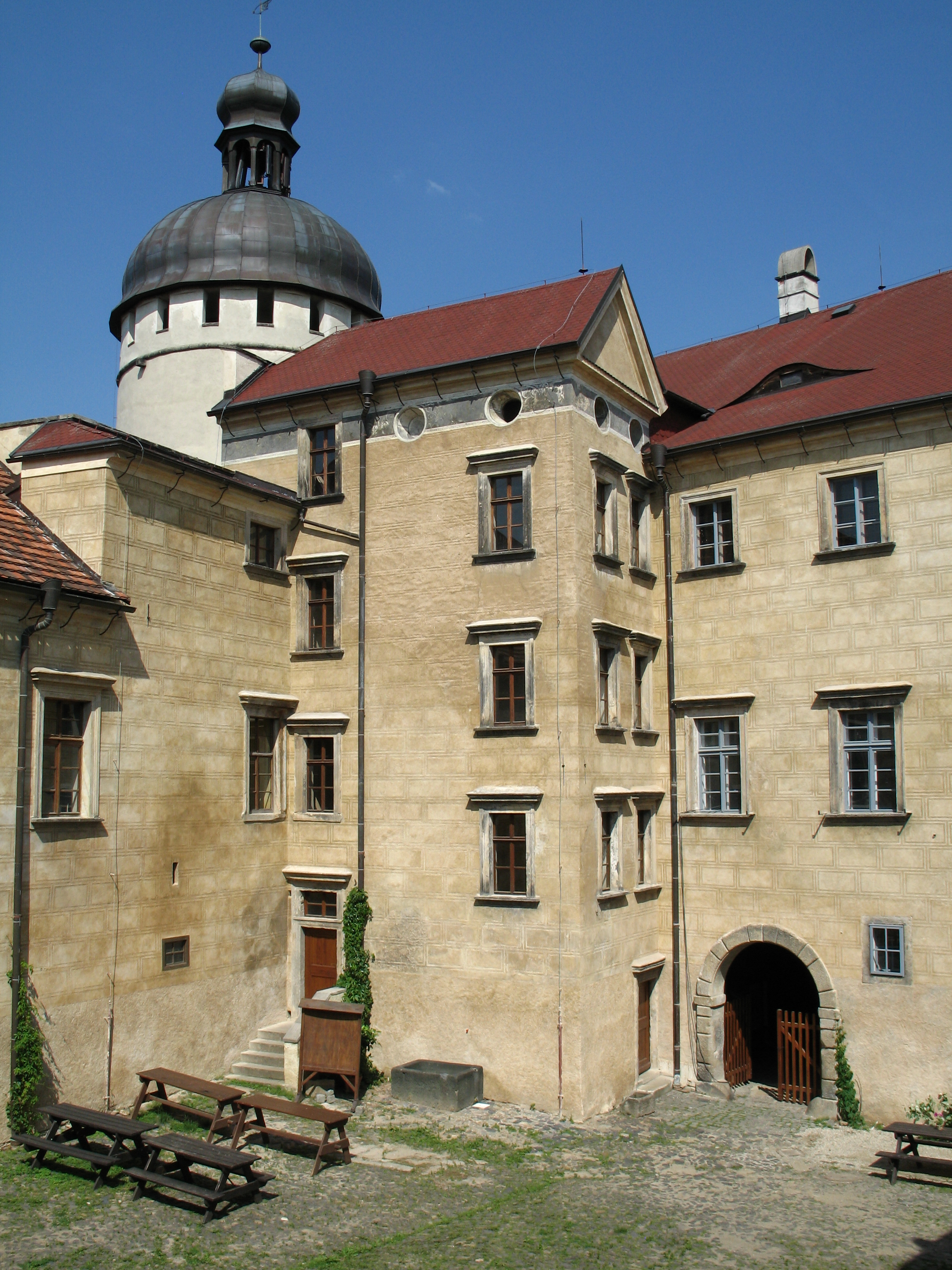
Courtyard
