= Kvítkov =

- Municipality
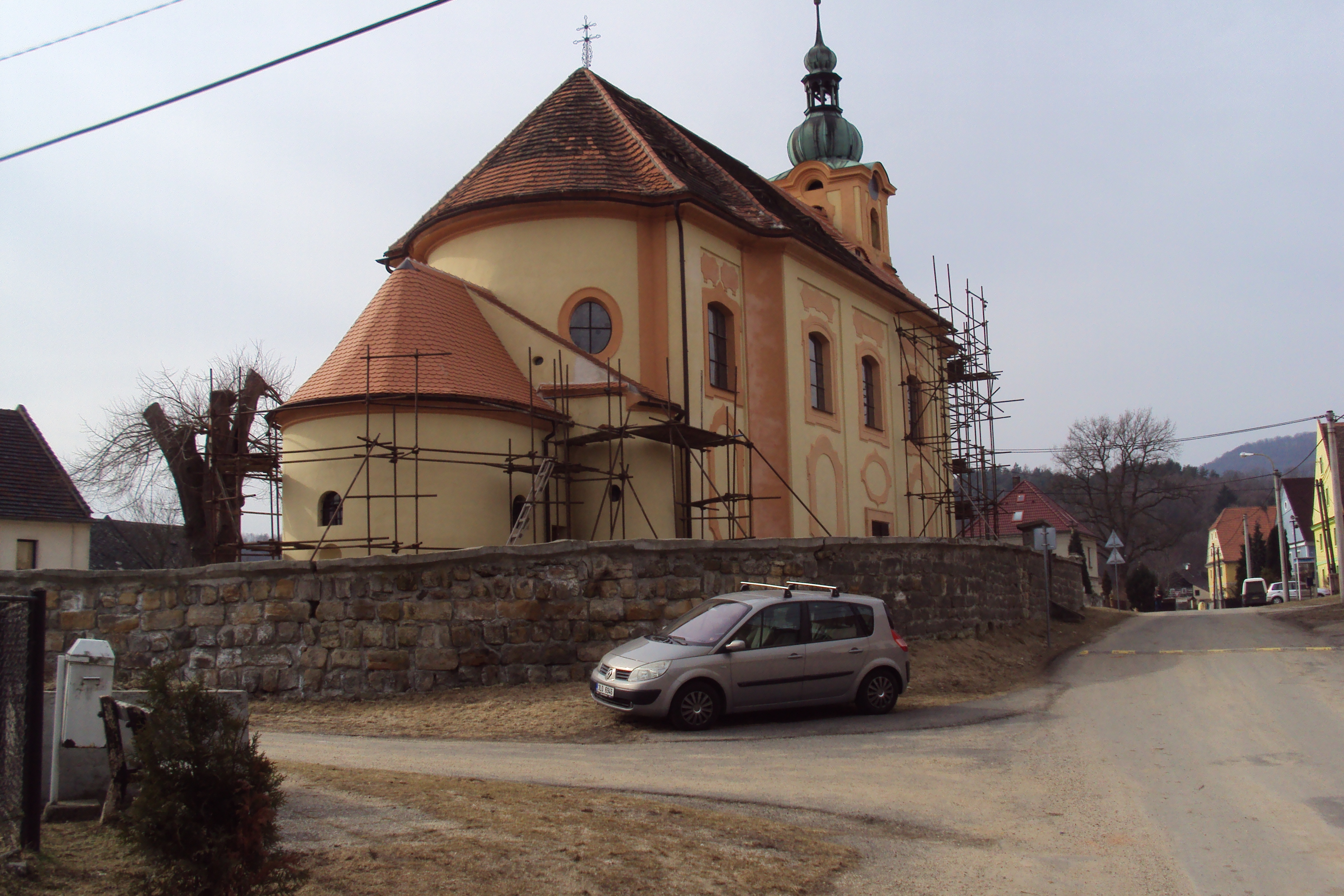
- Church of Saint James the Great

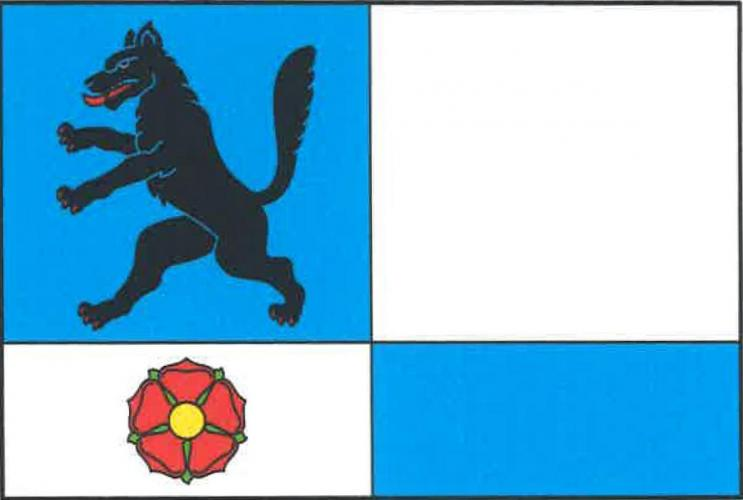
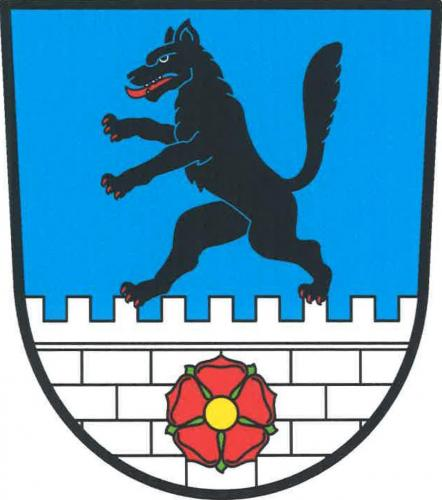
- Flag Coat of arms

- Location in the Czech Republic
- Coordinates: 50°39′18″N 14°29′12″E
- Country: Czech Republic
- Region: Liberec
- District: Česká Lípa
- First mentioned: 1295

Area
  - Total: 6.11 km^{2} (2.36 sq mi)
- Elevation: 303 m (994 ft)

Population (2026-01-01)
  - Total: 234
  - Density: 38.3/km^{2} (99.2/sq mi)
- Time zone: UTC+1 (CET)
  - Summer (DST): UTC+2 (CEST)
- Postal code: 470 01
- Website: www.kvitkov.cz

Kvítkov is a municipality and village in Česká Lípa District in the Liberec Region of the Czech Republic. It has about 200 inhabitants.

== Etymology ==
The name is derived from the personal name Kvítek, meaning "Kvítek's (court)".

== Geography ==
Kvítkov is located about 4 kilometres (2 mi) southwest of Česká Lípa and 40 km (25 mi) southwest of Liberec. It lies mostly in the Ralsko Uplands. A small part of the municipal territory in the northwest extends into the Central Bohemian Uplands and includes the highest point of Kvítkov at 401 m (1,316 ft) above sea level. The stream Robečský potok flows along the eastern municipal border.

== History ==
The first written mention of Kvítkov is from 1295, when the village was owned by Jan of Kvítkov. Until the 15th century, Kvítkov was owned by the Vlk of Kvítkov knights.

From 1980 to 1991, Kvítkov was a municipal part of Česká Lípa. Since 1992, it has been a separate municipality.

== Demographics ==
Historical population

Year	Pop.	±%
1869	248	—
1880	266	+7.3%
1890	241	−9.4%
1900	256	+6.2%
1910	249	−2.7%

Year	Pop.	±%
1921	244	−2.0%
1930	270	+10.7%
1950	153	−43.3%
1961	187	+22.2%
1970	141	−24.6%

Year	Pop.	±%
1980	105	−25.5%
1991	110	+4.8%
2001	147	+33.6%
2011	202	+37.4%
2021	228	+12.9%

Source: Censuses

== Transport ==
There are no railways or major roads passing through the municipality.

== Sights ==
The main landmark of the centre of Kvítkov is the Church of Saint James the Great. it was built in the Baroque style in 1726.

Kvítkov Castle is a ruin of a castle built in the first half of the 13th century. The castle was abandoned already in the 13th century. Only few remains and a cellar carved in the rock, which is still used today, have been preserved.
