= Velký Valtinov =

- Municipality
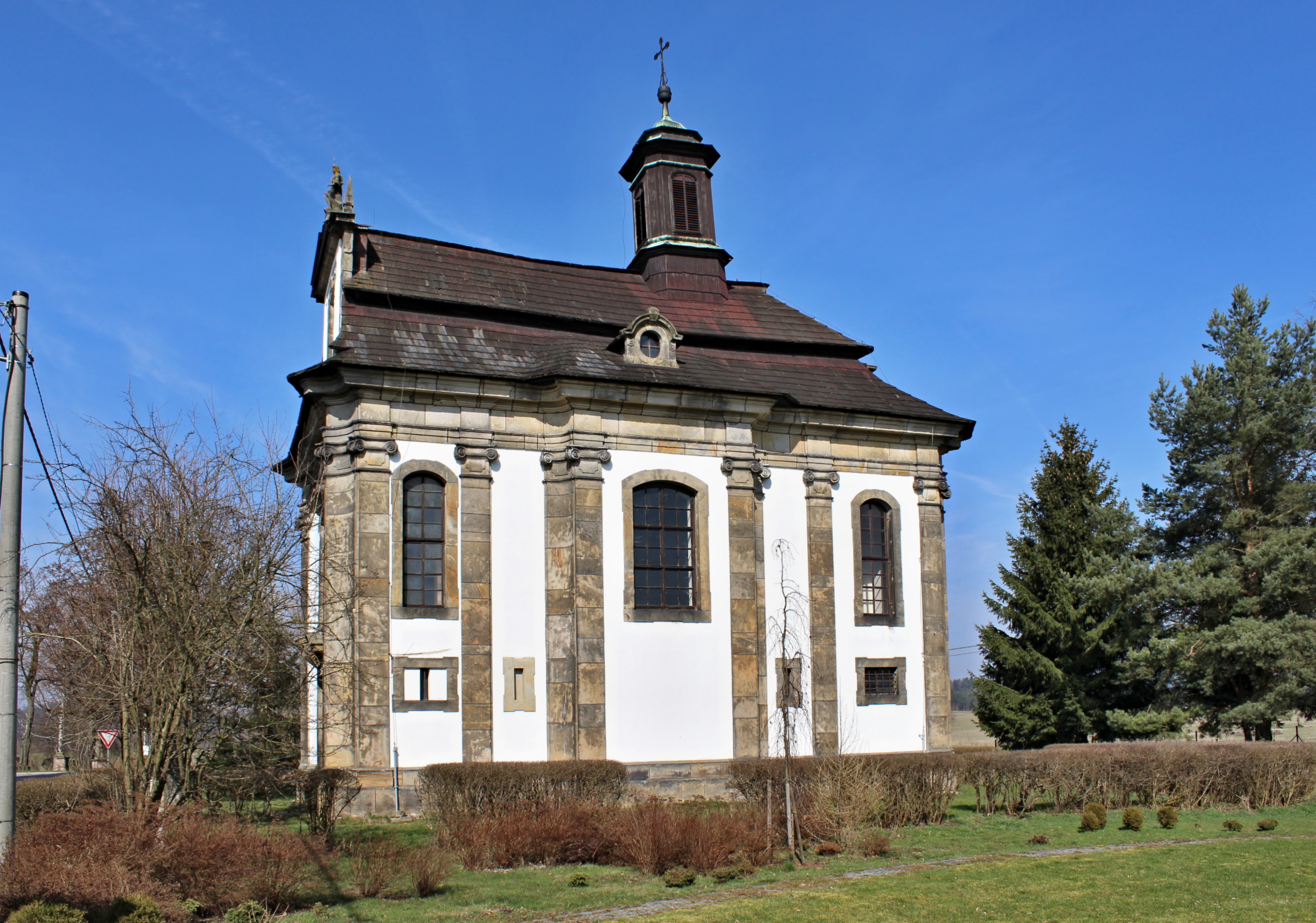
- Church of Saint John of Nepomuk

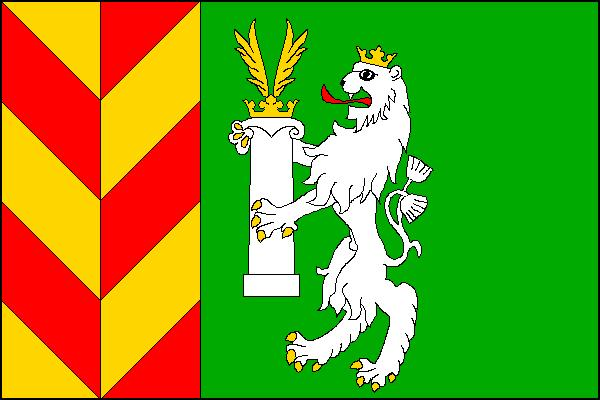
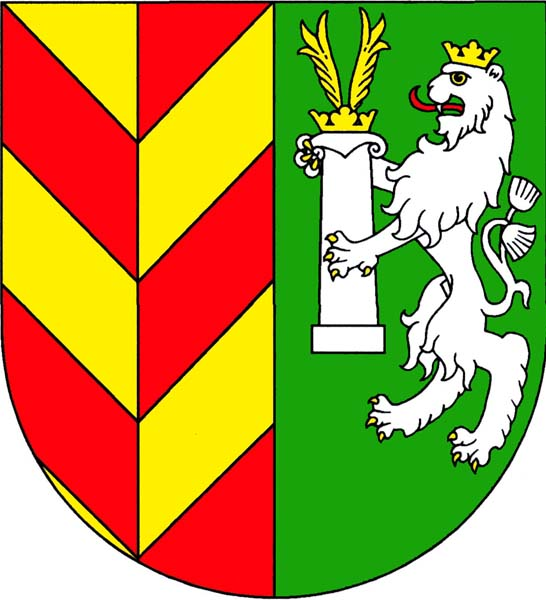
- Flag Coat of arms

- Location in the Czech Republic
- Coordinates: 50°44′37″N 14°44′8″E
- Country: Czech Republic
- Region: Liberec
- District: Česká Lípa
- First mentioned: 1395

Area
  - Total: 10.05 km^{2} (3.88 sq mi)
- Elevation: 292 m (958 ft)

Population (2026-01-01)
  - Total: 196
  - Density: 19.5/km^{2} (50.5/sq mi)
- Time zone: UTC+1 (CET)
  - Summer (DST): UTC+2 (CEST)
- Postal code: 471 25
- Website: www.velkyvaltinov.cz

Velký Valtinov (German: Groß Walten) is a municipality and village in Česká Lípa District in the Liberec Region of the Czech Republic. It has about 200 inhabitants.

== Demographics ==
Historical population
Year	Pop.	±%
1869	768	—
1880	707	−7.9%
1890	595	−15.8%
1900	631	+6.1%
1910	590	−6.5%
1921	562	−4.7%
1930	560	−0.4%
1950	381	−32.0%
1961	349	−8.4%
1970	268	−23.2%
1980	224	−16.4%
1991	181	−19.2%
2001	174	−3.9%
2011	180	+3.4%
2021	185	+2.8%
Source: Censuses
