= Slapy (Tábor District) =

- Municipality
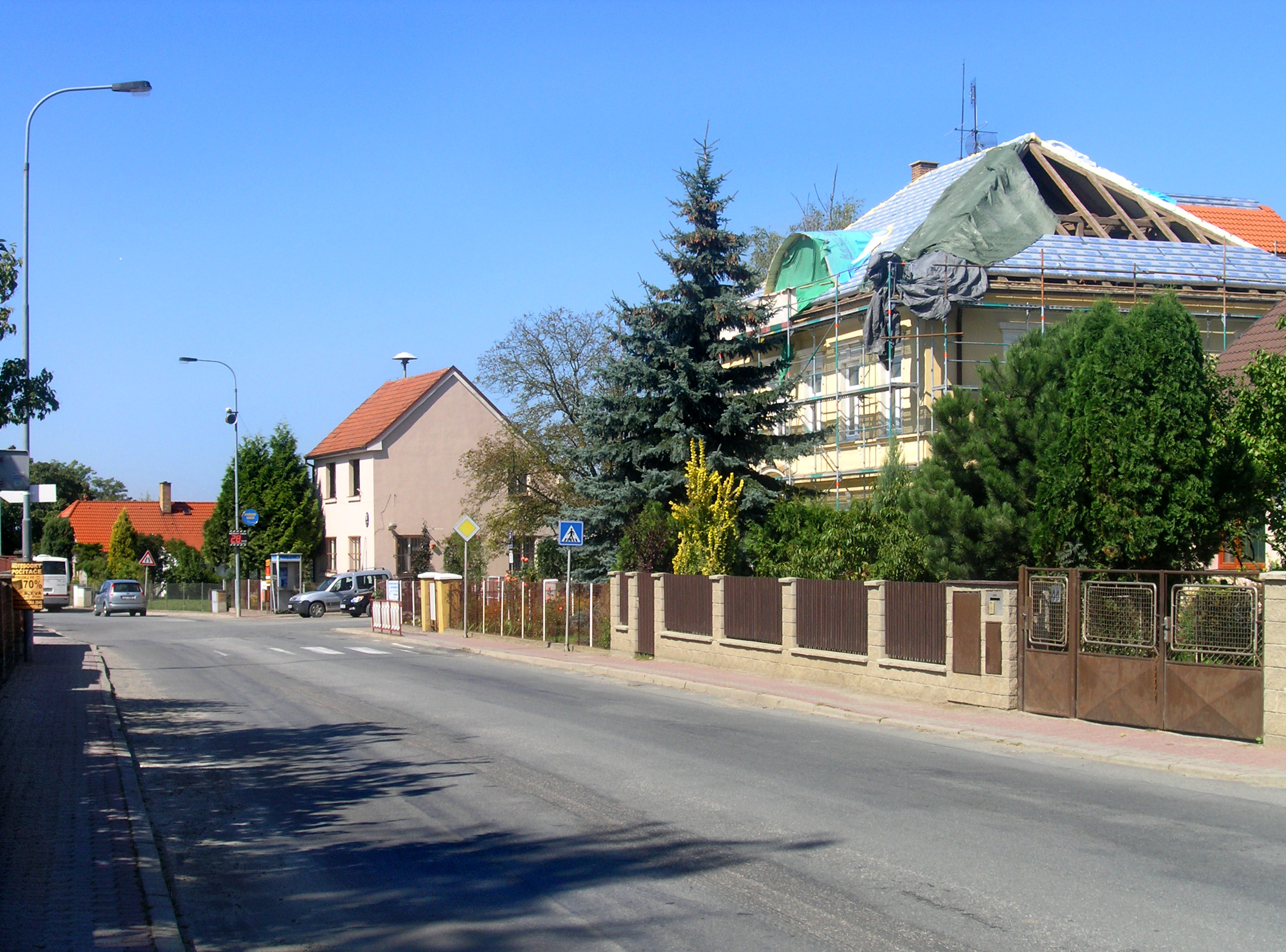
- Main street

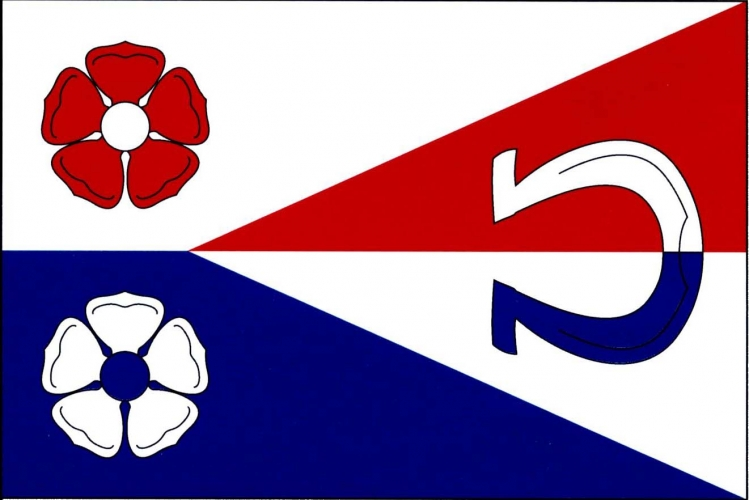
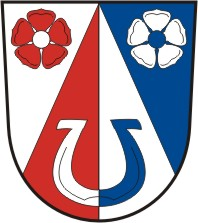
- Flag Coat of arms

- Location in the Czech Republic
- Coordinates: 49°23′13″N 14°37′0″E
- Country: Czech Republic
- Region: South Bohemian
- District: Tábor
- First mentioned: 1379

Area
  - Total: 6.32 km^{2} (2.44 sq mi)
- Elevation: 500 m (1,600 ft)

Population (2026-01-01)
  - Total: 526
  - Density: 83.2/km^{2} (216/sq mi)
- Time zone: UTC+1 (CET)
  - Summer (DST): UTC+2 (CEST)
- Postal codes: 391 75, 391 76
- Website: www.obecslapy.cz

Slapy is a municipality and village in Tábor District in the South Bohemian Region of the Czech Republic. It has about 500 inhabitants.

Slapy lies approximately 5 kilometres (3 mi) south-west of Tábor, 47 km (29 mi) north of České Budějovice, and 79 km (49 mi) south of Prague.

== Administrative division ==
Slapy consists of two municipal parts (in brackets population according to the 2021 census):

- Slapy (479)
- Hnojná Lhotka (17)

== Demographics ==
Historical population
Year	Pop.	±%
1869	344	—
1880	365	+6.1%
1890	359	−1.6%
1900	363	+1.1%
1910	320	−11.8%
1921	315	−1.6%
1930	330	+4.8%
1950	238	−27.9%
1961	314	+31.9%
1970	333	+6.1%
1980	390	+17.1%
1991	396	+1.5%
2001	421	+6.3%
2011	458	+8.8%
2021	496	+8.3%
Source: Censuses
