= Frýdštejn =

- Municipality
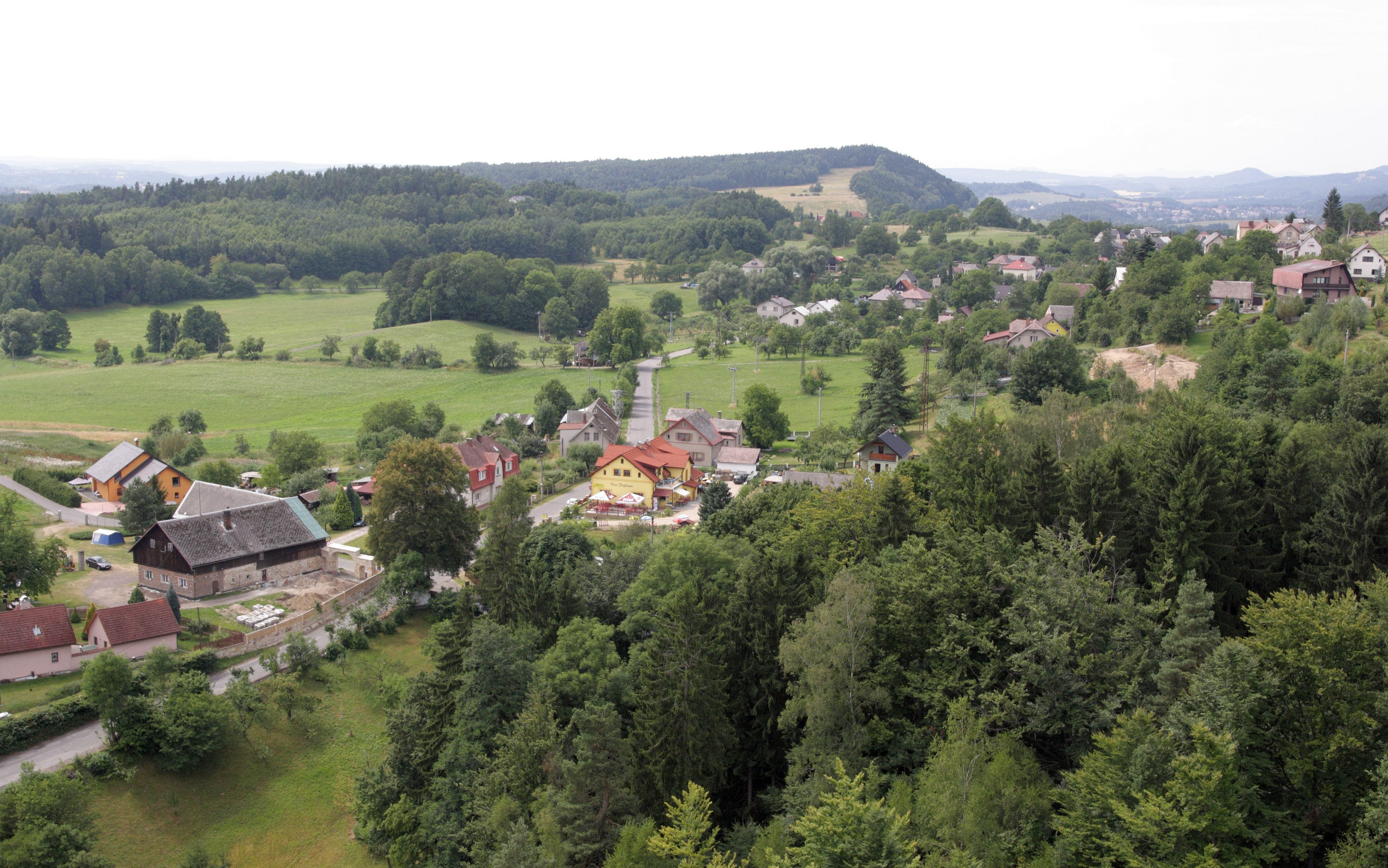
- Frýdštejn seen from the Frýdštejn Castle

- Flag Coat of arms

- Location in the Czech Republic
- Coordinates: 50°39′8″N 15°9′32″E
- Country: Czech Republic
- Region: Liberec
- District: Jablonec nad Nisou
- First mentioned: 1385

Area
  - Total: 14.49 km^{2} (5.59 sq mi)
- Elevation: 474 m (1,555 ft)

Population (2026-01-01)
  - Total: 853
  - Density: 58.9/km^{2} (152/sq mi)
- Time zone: UTC+1 (CET)
  - Summer (DST): UTC+2 (CEST)
- Postal codes: 463 42, 468 22
- Website: www.obec-frydstejn.cz

Frýdštejn (German: Friedstein) is a municipality and village in Jablonec nad Nisou District in the Liberec Region of the Czech Republic. It has about 900 inhabitants.

== Administrative division ==
Frýdštejn consists of 11 municipal parts (in brackets population according to the 2021 census):

- Frýdštejn (311)
- Anděl Strážce (15)
- Bezděčín (125)
- Borek (8)
- Horky (4)
- Kaškovice (51)
- Ondříkovice (32)
- Roudný (95)
- Sestroňovice (63)
- Slapy (0)
- Voděrady (146)

== Etymology ==
The initial German name Friedstein was derived from the Middle High German words vride ('peace', 'protection', 'safety') and stein ('castle'). So the name meant "guard castle", "castle for protection". Frýdštejn is a transcription of the German name.

== Geography ==
Frýdštejn is located about 7 kilometres (4 mi) south of Jablonec nad Nisou and 13 km (8 mi) south of Liberec. It lies on the border between the Jičín Uplands and Ještěd–Kozákov Ridge. The highest point is the hill Kopanina at 657 m (2,156 ft) above sea level.

== History ==
The first written mention of Frýdštejn and the Frýdštejn Castle is from 1385, when the area was owned by the nobleman Jan II of Biterštejn. In 1406, Frýdštejn was acquired by Bohuš of Kováň. He and his descendant owned the estate until 1489. After that, the owners often changed.

In 1552–1591, Frýdštejn was property of the Lords of Oppersdorf. The Smiřický of Smiřice family owned the estate from 1591 to the early 1620s. As a result of the Battle of the White Mountain, their properties were confiscated and Frýdštejn was acquired by Albrecht von Wallenstein in 1623. After his death in 1634, Frýdštejn became property of the Isolani family. Countess Regina Isolani bequeathed the estate to the Augustinians in Vienna. Frýdštejn was a church property until 1838. From 1838 until the establishment of an independent municipality in 1848, Frýdštejn was owned by Count Kamil Rohan.

== Demographics ==
Historical population

Year	Pop.	±%
1869	1,630	—
1880	1,624	−0.4%
1890	1,699	+4.6%
1900	1,780	+4.8%
1910	1,820	+2.2%

Year	Pop.	±%
1921	1,681	−7.6%
1930	1,799	+7.0%
1950	1,160	−35.5%
1961	1,156	−0.3%
1970	1,039	−10.1%

Year	Pop.	±%
1980	989	−4.8%
1991	803	−18.8%
2001	807	+0.5%
2011	824	+2.1%
2021	850	+3.2%

Source: Censuses

== Transport ==
The I/10 road (part of the European route E65) from Turnov to the Czech–Polish border in Harrachov runs through the southern part of the municipality.

== Sights ==
Frýdštejn is known for the ruins of the Frýdštejn Castle. Existence of this rock castle was first documented in 1385. It was abandoned in the second half of the 16th century, after it lost its military function.

Drábovna is a small sandstone rock town with remains of a medieval castle and an archaeological site.

On the hill Kopanina is the eponymous observation tower. It is a 18 m (59 ft) high brick tower, built in 1894.

== Notable people ==
- Zdeněk Hoření (1930–2021), journalist
