= Ralsko Military Training Area =

Military training area in Czechia

Coordinates: 50°36′56″N 14°48′55″E

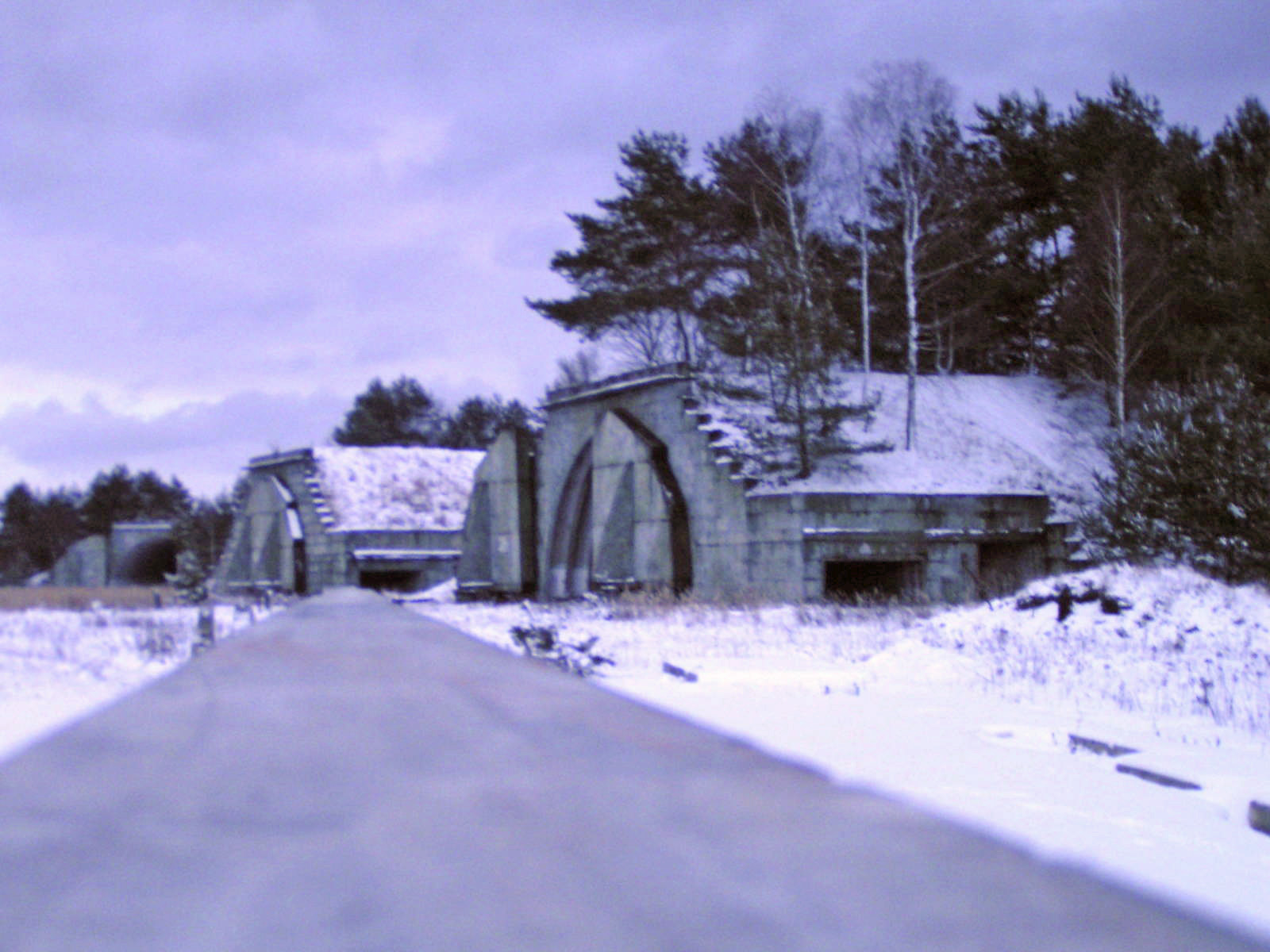
Hradčany airfield in the former Ralsko military training area

The Ralsko Military Training Area (Czech: Vojenský prostor Ralsko) was a restricted military/munitions testing area in Liberec Region of the Czech Republic. It was located between the towns of Mimoň, Stráž pod Ralskem, Mnichovo Hradiště and Bělá pod Bezdězem. It also included the Ralsko mountain peak, as well as the Hradčany Air Base. The area is about 250 square kilometres (97 sq mi) consisting of forests, meadows and sandstone rock formations.

== History ==
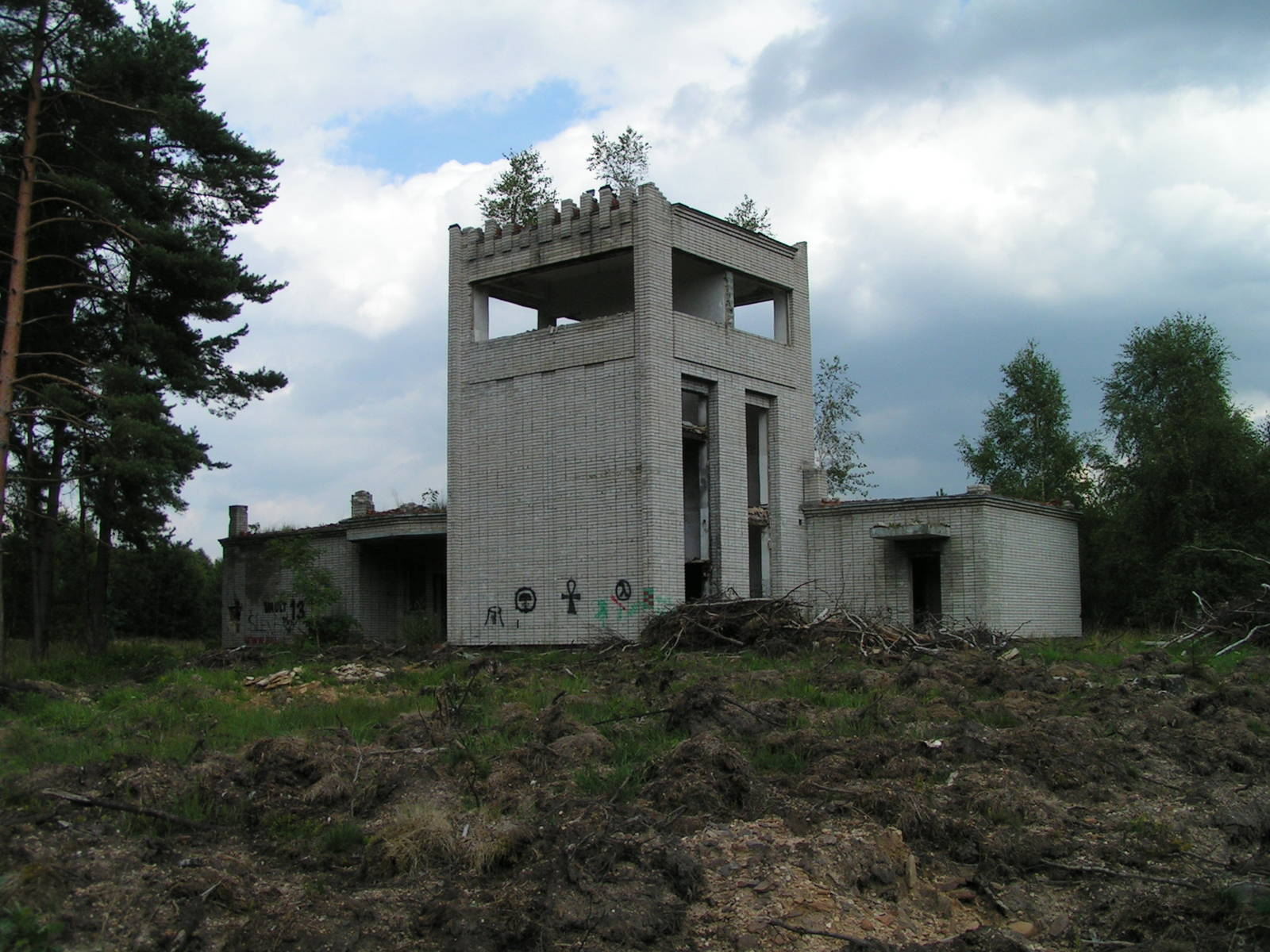
Former Soviet military buildings near Hradový

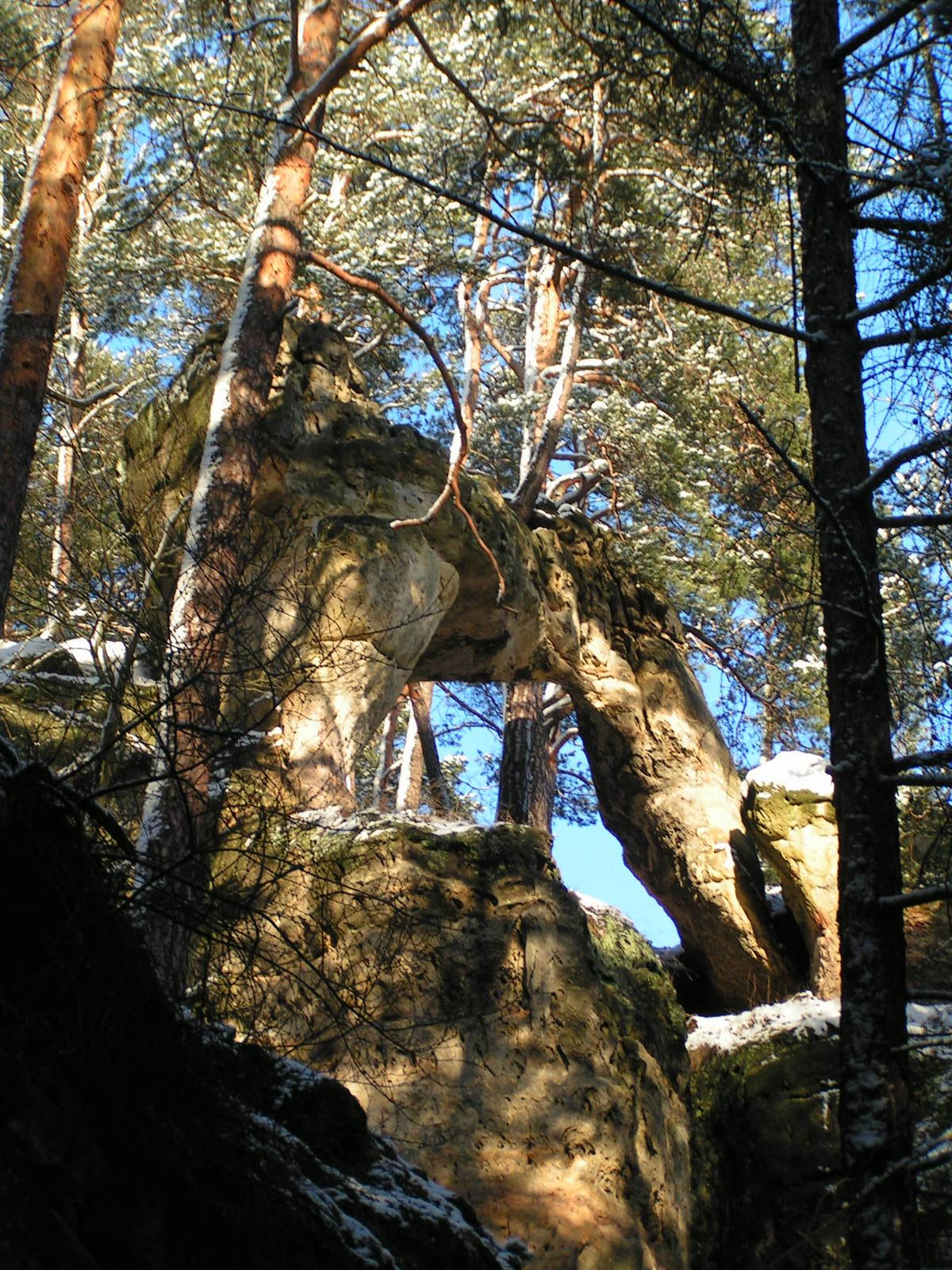
Rock formation at Hradčanské

The Ralsko area was relatively sparsely populated until the first half of the 20th century. The residents were predominantly German-speaking. Most of the forests belonged to some large landowners, such as the noble families Hartig, Rohan and Waldstein. From 1914, the Graeflich Waldstein Forestry Office operated a narrow-gauge forest railway between Rečkov and Kummer, which was used to transport lumber.

After the Munich Agreement in 1938, the German Wehrmacht occupied the area. In March 1945, near the end of World War II the construction of an airfield began near Hradčany. After the Prague Offensive and the Soviet occupation of the area, most of the German-Bohemian population were expelled from the area.

The military zone including all villages previously inhabited by Sudeten Germans that was cleared for the military in 1947, after the expulsion of Germans from Czechoslovakia. About 17 villages were destroyed during this period. From 1947 to 1968 the Czechoslovak Army used the area.

After the 1968 Prague Spring the Soviet Army controlled the area. In the late 1980s the Soviet 442nd Missile Brigade stationed SS-21 short-range tactical missiles at Hvězdov.

After Soviet troops left Czechoslovakia in 1991, the area has been accessible to civilians again. Many of the discarded Czech and Soviet munitions were collected and are now on display at a little museum in Kuřívody.

Several places have been re-populated and have merged to form the Ralsko municipality. Some of these village ruins and remnants of the military facilities (concrete bunkers) are still visible. Some of the open areas and forests are still contaminated with ammunition and the groundwater in some areas still have pollutants. The area also created an ecologically valuable landscape in which many endangered animal and plant species live. Entering the site is permitted with restrictions.

=== Settlements ===
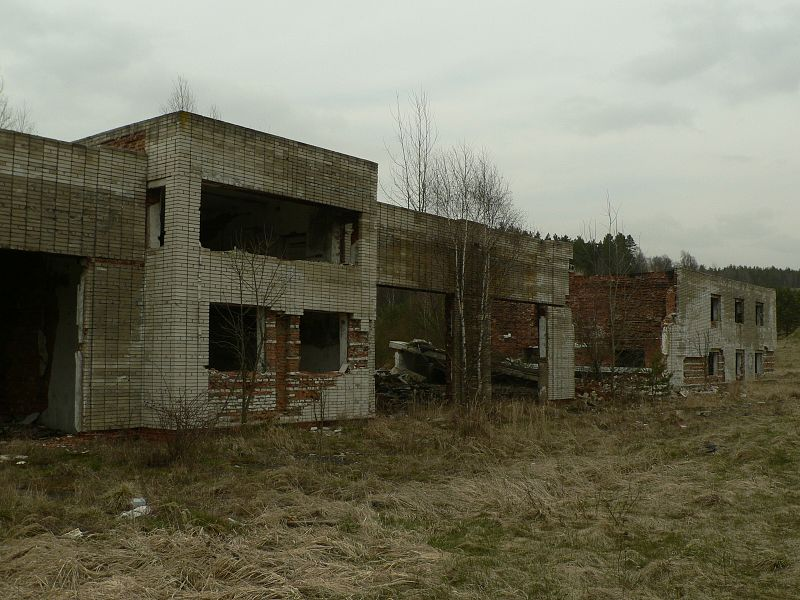
Former soldiers' apartments in Svébořice

Some of the villages and towns in the area have recovered since the closure of the military zone and the pullout of Soviet troops, such as Hvězdov (Höflitz), Kuřívody (Hühnerwasser), Noviny pod Ralskem (Neuland am Rollberge), Stráž pod Ralskem (Wartenberg am Rollberg), Okna (Woken) and Cetenov (Zetten).

Other small villages remain in ruins (pieces of foundations or walls) or have completely disappeared, such as Černá Novina (Schwarzwald), Holičky (Hultschken), Horní Krupá (Kridai), Jablonec (Gablonz), Olšina (Wolschen), Palohlavy (Halbehaupt), Proseč (Proschwitz), Svébořice (Schwabitz), Strážov (Straßdorf) and Židlov (Schiedel).

=== Protected areas ===
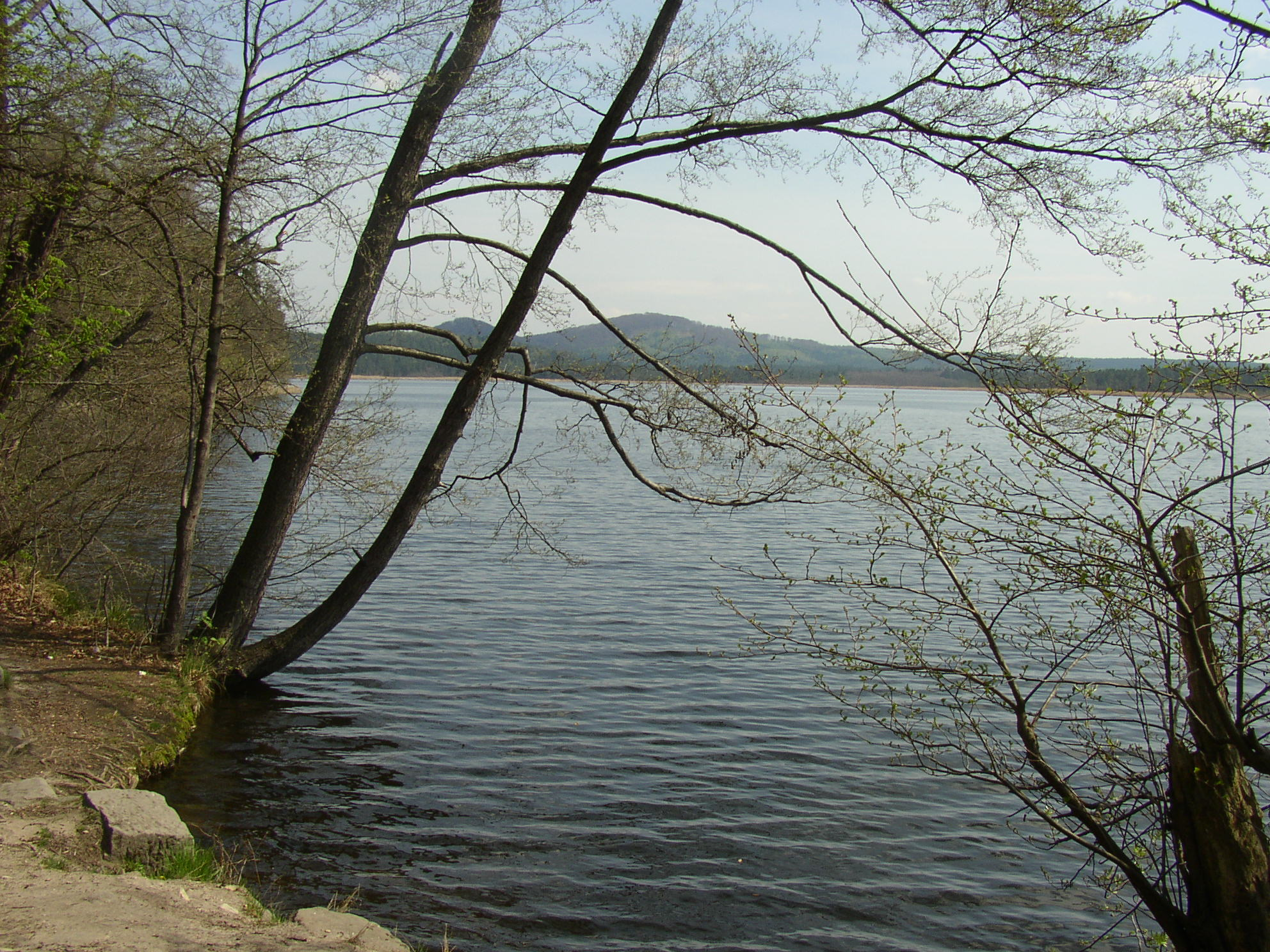
Břehyňský Pond in the Břehyně-Pecopala National Nature Reserve

Much of the former Ralsko military training area is now protected (around 7,000 hectares). Some areas have been declared as nature reserves or natural monuments.

There is also the Českolipsko-Dokeské pískovce a mokřady bird sanctuary in the area.

== In popular culture ==
After the formation of the Czech Republic in 1992, several movies were filmed at the location of the former Ralsko military area and the airfield at Hradčany, such as the war films Stalingrad (1993) and Dark Blue World (2001).
