= Mimoň =

- Town
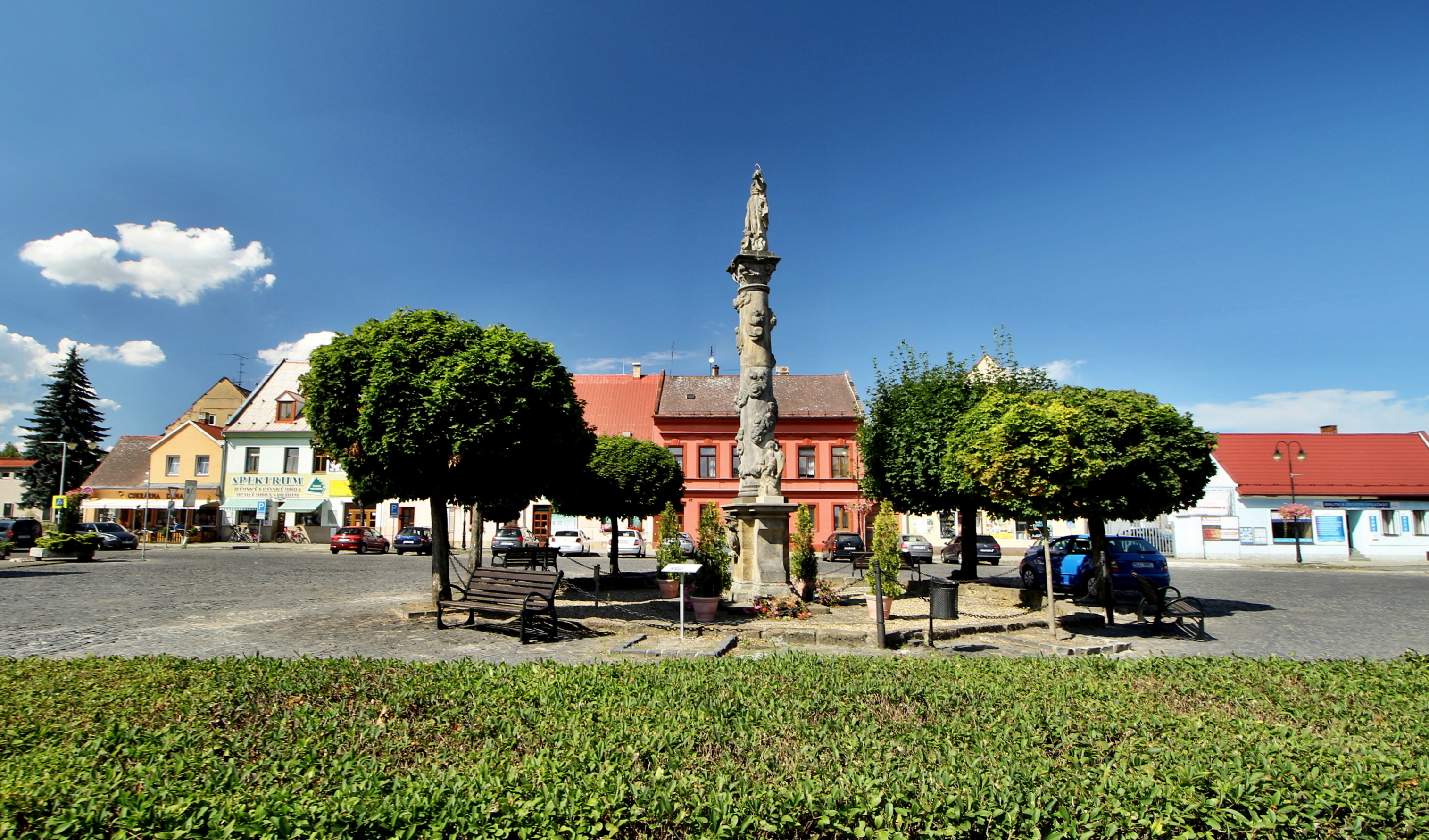
- The square Náměstí 1. máje

- Flag Coat of arms

- Location in the Czech Republic
- Coordinates: 50°39′23″N 14°43′49″E
- Country: Czech Republic
- Region: Liberec
- District: Česká Lípa
- First mentioned: 1352

Government
  - Mayor: Petr Král

Area
  - Total: 15.48 km^{2} (5.98 sq mi)
- Elevation: 280 m (920 ft)

Population (2026-01-01)
  - Total: 6,321
  - Density: 408.3/km^{2} (1,058/sq mi)
- Time zone: UTC+1 (CET)
  - Summer (DST): UTC+2 (CEST)
- Postal code: 471 24
- Website: mestomimon.cz

Mimoň (Czech pronunciation: [ˈmɪmoɲ]; German: Niemes) is a town in Česká Lípa District in the Liberec Region of the Czech Republic. It has about 6,300 inhabitants. The town is located on the Ploučnice River in the Ralsko Uplands.

Mimoň became a town at the beginning of the 16th century. The main landmark of the town is the Church of Saints Peter and Paul.

== Administrative division ==
Mimoň consists of eight municipal parts (in brackets population according to the 2021 census):

- Mimoň I (3,345)
- Mimoň II (237)
- Mimoň III (566)
- Mimoň IV (1,232)
- Mimoň V (580)
- Mimoň VI (25)
- Srní Potok (11)
- Vranov (105)

== Etymology ==
The name is derived from the personal name Mimon, meaning "Mimon's". The German name Niemes was created by taking over the Czech name and gradually distorting it (through the forms Nimon, Niman, Nimans, Niemans).

== Geography ==
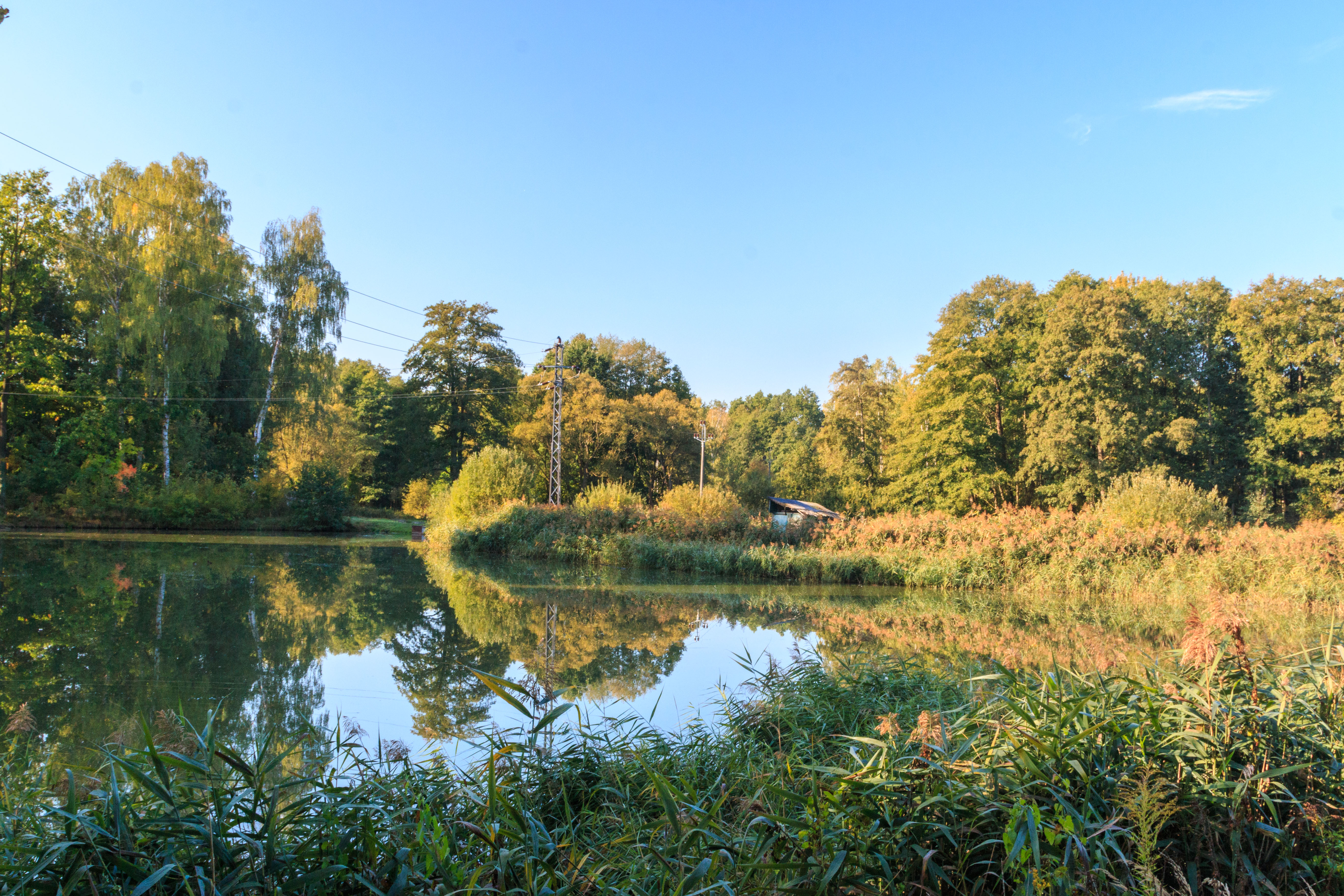
Mimoňské rybníky

Mimoň is located about 13 kilometres (8 mi) east of Česká Lípa and 25 km (16 mi) southwest of Liberec. It lies in the Ralsko Uplands. The highest point is below the mountain Ralsko at 380 m (1,247 ft) above sea level. The town is situated at the confluence of the Ploučnice River and the stream Panenský potok. In the municipal territory is a system of four breeding fishponds fed by the Ploučnice, called Mimoňské rybníky ('Mimoň ponds').

== History ==
The oldest archaeological finds from the area around Mimoň are from the Neolithic and the Bronze Age. The first Slavic settlements appeared in the 5th century, later German colonists came.

=== 14–17th centuries ===
The first written mention of Mimoň is from 1352, when it was a parish village. Mimoň was then mentioned in 1371 as a customs post on an old trading route from Zittau to Prague. At the time, the village was under the control of the Lords of Vartenberk.

The economic development of Mimoň was affected by the Hussite Wars. In 1500, Mimoň was acquired by the Bieberstein family. In 1505, Mimoň was first referred to as a town. The Biebersteins had built here a manor house in 1570. During the Thirty Years' War, Mimoň was damaged by fire. In 1651, Mimoň was bought by the Putz of Adlersthurm family. During their rule, the town prospered. The family had most of the important buildings built: the church, the Chapel of the Holy Sepulchre, the town hall, a hospital, a brewery, and had the manor house rebuilt into a castle.

=== 18th and 19th century ===
In 1718, the town was inherited by the Hartig family, who owned it until 1945. In 1806, the town was almost completely destroyed by a fire. In 1836, a textile factory was established by master cloth maker Anton Schicketanz (1803–1866).

After the Revolutionary events in 1848, Mimoň became part of the judicial district of Niemes for the Habsburg Crownland of Bohemia (and later for Austria-Hungary). This district included 26 small villages in a large wooded area east of Mimoň such as Kuřívody, Hvězdov, Hradčany, Vranov, Svébořice, Černá Novina, Strážov, Stráž pod Ralskem and Olšina.

In 1883, the first railway station of the Imperial Royal Austrian State Railways was completed in Mimoň. At the end of the 19th century, Mimoň had a furniture factory, cloth and cotton weaving companies, a tannery and a beer brewery. Agriculture and forestry was also practiced.

=== 20th–21st centuries ===
After World War I and the Dissolution of Austria-Hungary, Mimoň became part of newly created Czechoslovakia in late October 1918. German citizens in Mimoň protested until Czech soldiers entered the town to keep order. In 1930, the population was of Mimoň was over 6,000 people, of which over 5,000 people were German-speaking.

With the rise of Nazism in Germany, so did German Nationalism through much of German-Bohemia. After the Munich Agreement in 1938, Mimoň was annexed by Nazi Germany and was administered as part of the Reichsgau Sudetenland. Some citizens of Mimoň became part of the paramilitary group Sudetendeutsches Freikorps who officially welcomed German Wehrmacht troops into the town on 10 October 1938. During the World War II, there was a military training camp of the Hitler Youth in Mimoň.

From 6 to 11 May 1945, during the Prague Offensive, Czechoslovakia was liberated by the Soviet Red Army and Czech freedom fighters. The Red Army bombed Mimoň by air and arrived in Mimoň on 10 May 1945. After World War II, most of the German-speaking population was expelled and the town was re-populated by Czechs.

In 2010, Mimoň was hit by a severe flood. Afterwards, the town made extensive repairs to its infrastructure.

== Demographics ==
Historical population

| Year | Pop. | ±% |
|---|---|---|
| 1869 | 4,653 | — |
| 1880 | 4,807 | +3.3% |
| 1890 | 5,814 | +20.9% |
| 1900 | 6,231 | +7.2% |
| 1910 | 6,468 | +3.8% |

| Year | Pop. | ±% |
|---|---|---|
| 1921 | 5,801 | −10.3% |
| 1930 | 6,329 | +9.1% |
| 1950 | 5,377 | −15.0% |
| 1961 | 6,386 | +18.8% |
| 1970 | 6,294 | −1.4% |

| Year | Pop. | ±% |
|---|---|---|
| 1980 | 7,048 | +12.0% |
| 1991 | 6,487 | −8.0% |
| 2001 | 6,737 | +3.9% |
| 2011 | 6,414 | −4.8% |
| 2021 | 6,101 | −4.9% |

Source: Censuses

== Transport ==
Mimoň is located on the Liberec–Ústí nad Labem railway.

== Sights ==
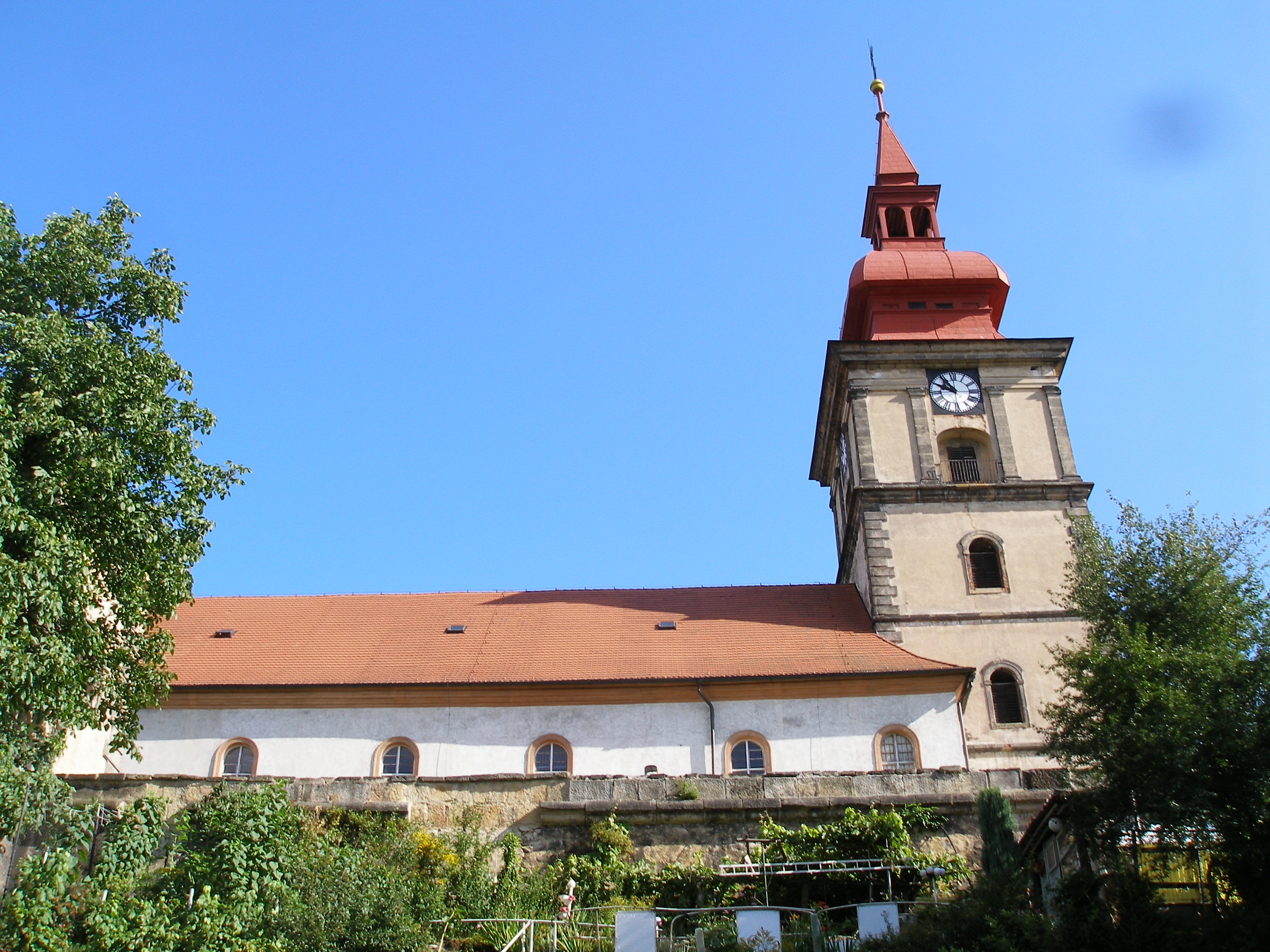
Church of Saints Peter and Paul

The main landmark of Mimoň is the Church of Saints Peter and Paul. A church existed here already in the 12th century. The current parish church was built on the site of the old church in the Baroque style in 1661–1663. The tower was built in 1674 and the rectory in 1678.

The town centre is formed by the square Náměstí 1. máje. A column with statue of the Virgin Mary was set up on the town square in 1677.

The castle in Mimoň was used by the Czechoslovak army and fell into disrepair. By the 1980s, the castle was in ruins and was demolished in 1985. The only reminder of the castle still in existence is the Mimoň Castle Park and the castle pond.

== Notable people ==
- Louis Nerz (1867–1938), screenwriter and actor
- Marie Köstler (1879–1965), nurse, trade unionist and politician
- Stefanie Rabatsch (1887–1975), Hitler's love interest
- Rudolf Watzke (1892–1972), bass singer
- Jaroslav Bureš (born 1954), lawyer and politician

== Twin towns – sister cities ==
Mimoň is twinned with:

- Nová Baňa, Slovakia
- Oelsnitz, Germany
- Złotoryja, Poland
