= Ploučnice =

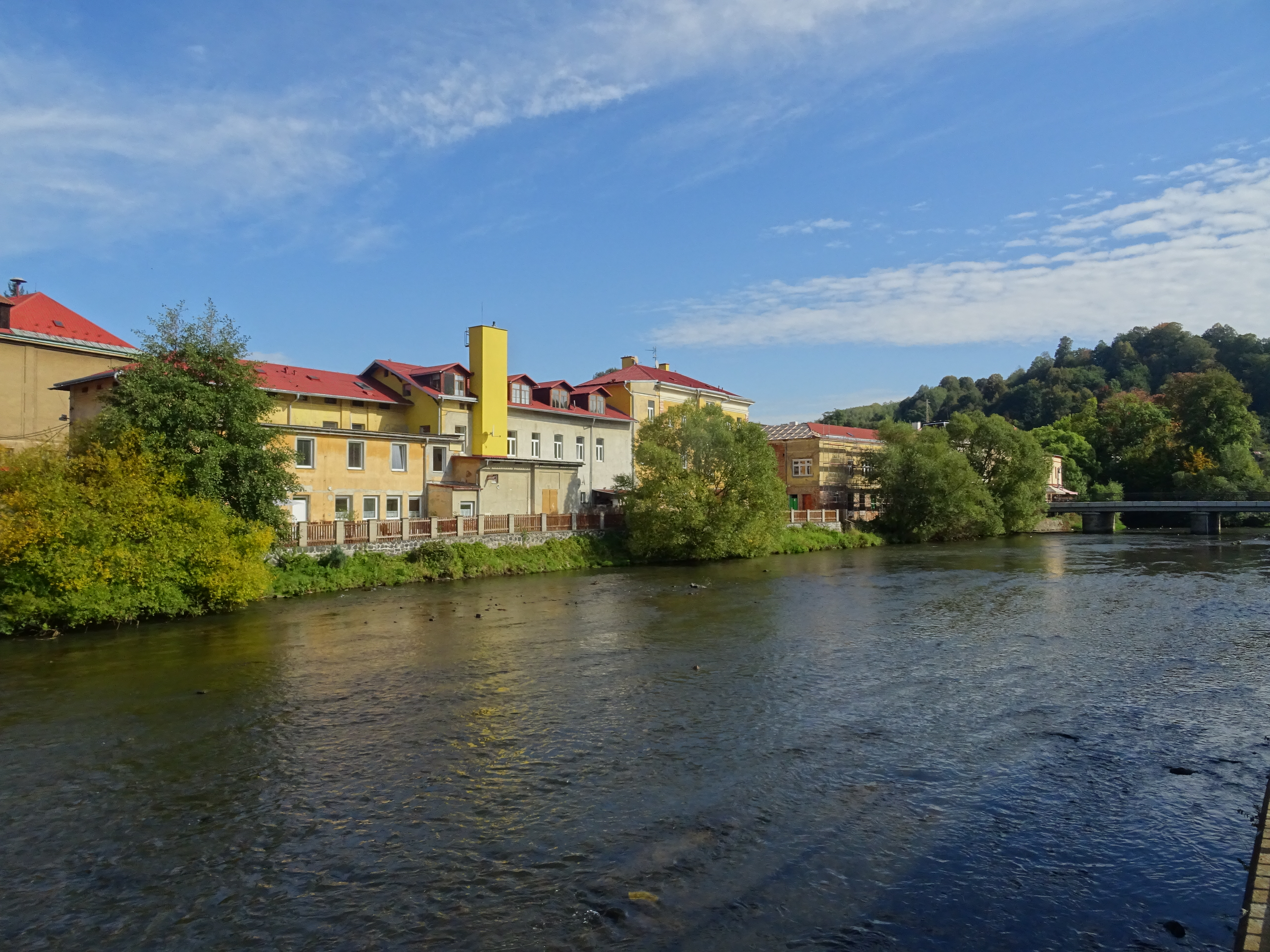
- The Ploučnice in Benešov nad Ploučnicí

Location
- Country: Czech Republic
- Regions: Liberec; Ústí nad Labem

Physical characteristics
- Source
  - location: Osečná, Ralsko Uplands
  - coordinates: 50°42′13″N 14°55′52″E
  - elevation: 387 m (1,270 ft)
- Mouth
  - location: Elbe
  - coordinates: 50°46′41″N 14°12′25″E
  - elevation: 124 m (407 ft)
- Length: 101.4 km (63.0 mi)
- Basin size: 1,188.1 km^{2} (458.7 sq mi)
- Discharge
  - average: 8.13 m^{3}/s (287 cu ft/s) near estuary

Basin features
- Progression: Elbe→ North Sea

The Ploučnice (Czech pronunciation: [ˈploutʃɲɪtsɛ]; German: Polzen) is a river in the Czech Republic, a right tributary of the Elbe River. It flows through the Liberec and Ústí nad Labem regions. It is 101.4 km (63.0 mi) long, making it the 23rd longest river in the Czech Republic.

== Etymology ==
The name of the river is derived from the Czech word plž (meaning 'mollusc'). The river was probably originally called plžčnice (meaning "a stream full of molluscs").

== Characteristic ==
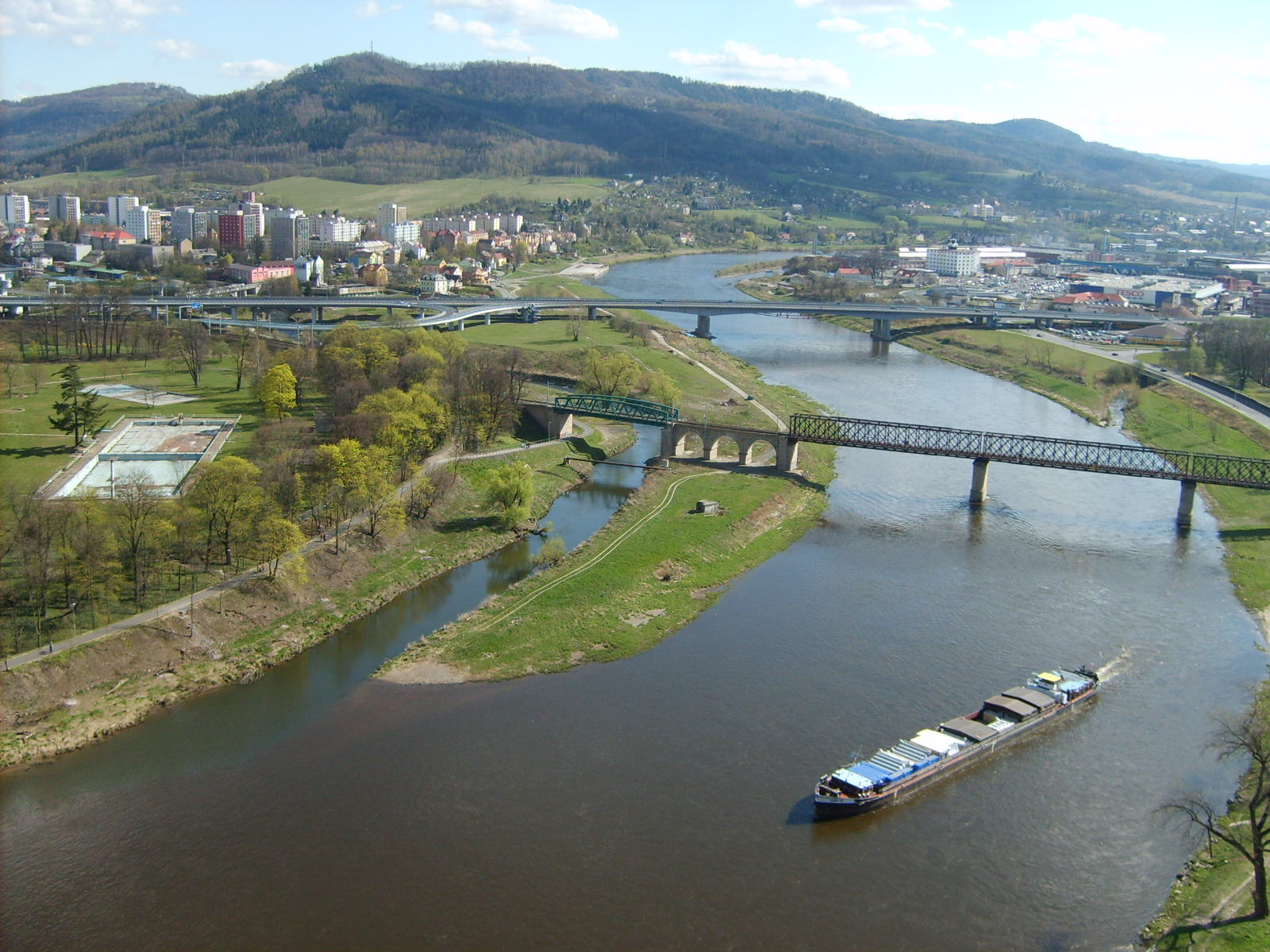
Confluence of the Ploučnice (left) with the Elbe in Děčín

The Ploučnice originates in the territory of Osečná in the Ralsko Uplands at an elevation of 387 m (1,270 ft). The spring area is considered to be one of the most abundant in Central Europe, which is why this spring is the main one. The secondary spring of the Ploučnice is located in the territory of Světlá pod Ještědem, on the slopes of Ještěd Mountain in the Ještěd–Kozákov Ridge at an elevation of 613 m (2,011 ft). The river flows to Děčín, where it enters the Elbe River at an elevation of 124 m (407 ft). It is 101.4 km (63.0 mi) long, making it the 23rd longest river in the Czech Republic. Its drainage basin has an area of 1,188.1 km^{2} (458.7 sq mi).

The longest tributaries of the Ploučnice are:

Tributary	Length (km)	River km	Side
Svitavka / Zwittebach	37.1	50.5	right
Panenský potok	30.1	73.4	right
Robečský potok	27.2	32.9	left
Šporka	23.2	34.2	right
Bystrá	19.6	10.9	right
Dobranovský potok	18.4	44.0	right
Ještědský potok	18.4	84.9	right
Dubnický potok	13.8	84.6	right
Merboltický potok	11.4	19.1	left
Ploužnický potok	10.1	72.1	left

== Course ==
The most notable settlements on the river are the town of Česká Lípa and the city of Děčín. The river flows through the municipal territories of Osečná, Hamr na Jezeře, Stráž pod Ralskem, Noviny pod Ralskem, Mimoň, Ralsko, Zákupy, Česká Lípa, Stružnice, Horní Police, Žandov, Starý Šachov, Františkov nad Ploučnicí, Benešov nad Ploučnicí and Děčín.

== Bodies of water ==
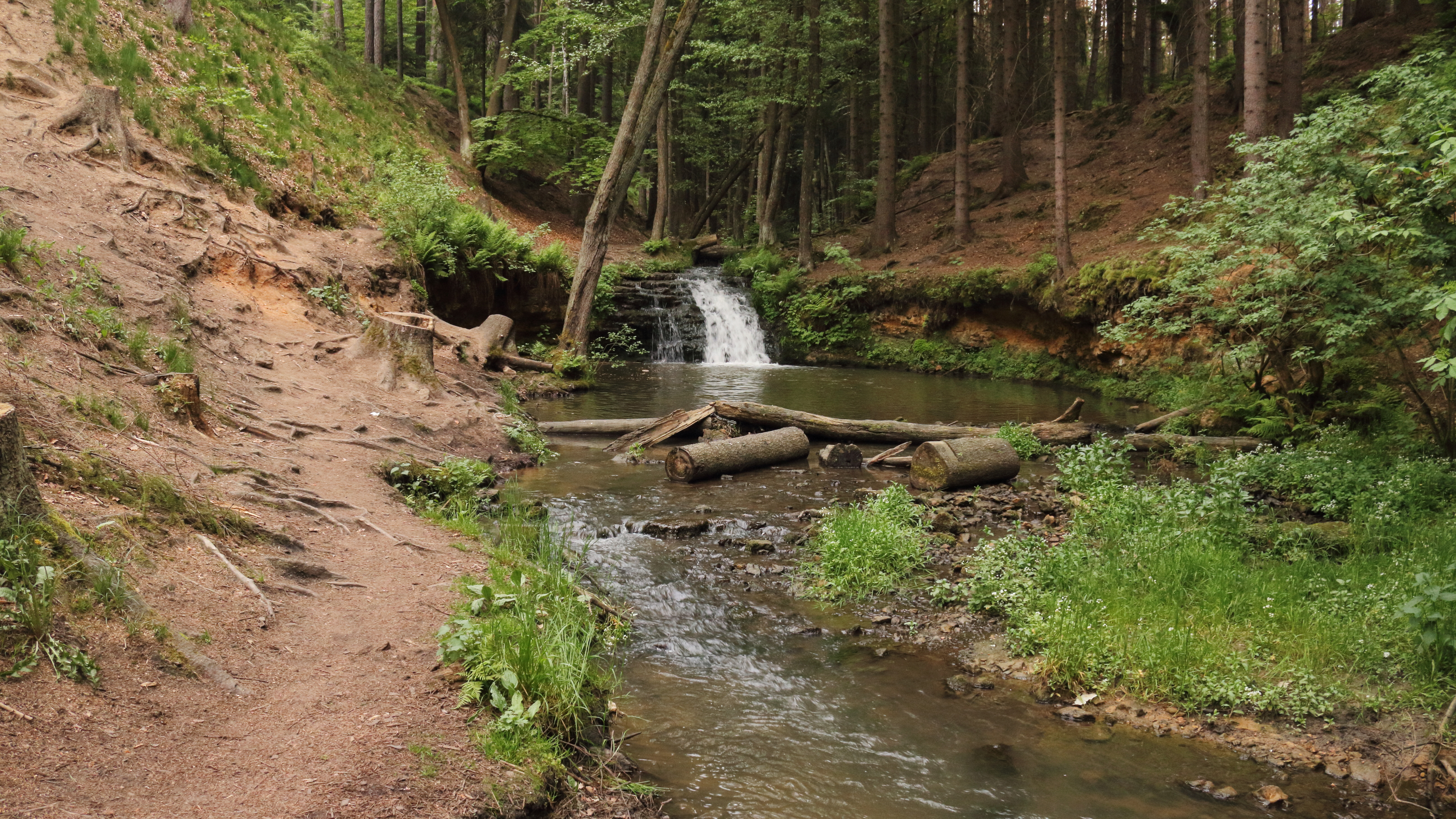
Chrastenský Waterfall on the upper course of the river

There are 99 bodies of water larger than 1 ha in the basin area. The largest of them is Lake Mácha with an area of 284 ha (700 acres). The largest bodies of water built directly on the Ploučnice are the Stráž pod Ralskem Reservoir and the fishpond Hamerské jezero. There is also the fishpond Jenišovský rybník built just beyond the main spring of the river.

== Fauna ==
In 2007–2011, 66 species of molluscs (27% of the species living in the Czech Republic) was founded in and around the river. Among the most endangered species are Clausilia bidentata, Daudebardia brevipes, Ruthenica filograna, Vertigo angustior and Vertigo antivertigo.

Near Mimoň, the river meanders and this area is protected as Meandry Ploučnice u Mimoně Nature Monument. It has an area of 49.4 ha (122 acres). The river and the surrounding wetlands are home to green snaketail, scarce large blue, large copper, Atlantic salmon and Eurasian otter.

== Tourism ==
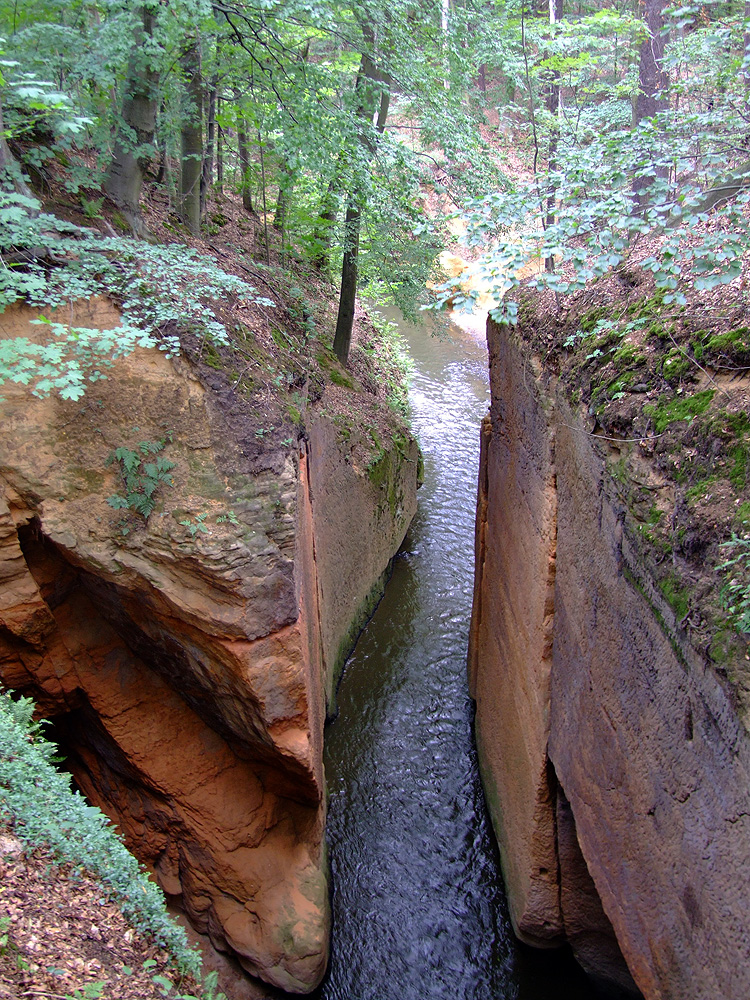
Ploučnice Gap

The Ploučnice is suitable for river tourism. Due to the high volume of water, the river is navigable all year round up to Benešov nad Ploučnicí. The river meanders a lot throughout its course and flows through an intact landscape (including the Ralsko Military Training Area), which makes it one of the most attractive rivers in the Czech Republic for paddlers.

A popular tourist section of the river is the Ploučnice Gap, located in Noviny pod Ralskem. It is an artificially created tunnel through the rock, which served the operation of a hammer mill. It is several centuries old and is protected as a cultural monument.
