= Olšina (Ralsko) =

Extinct village in the Czech Republic

Coordinates: 50°37′44″N 14°52′48″E

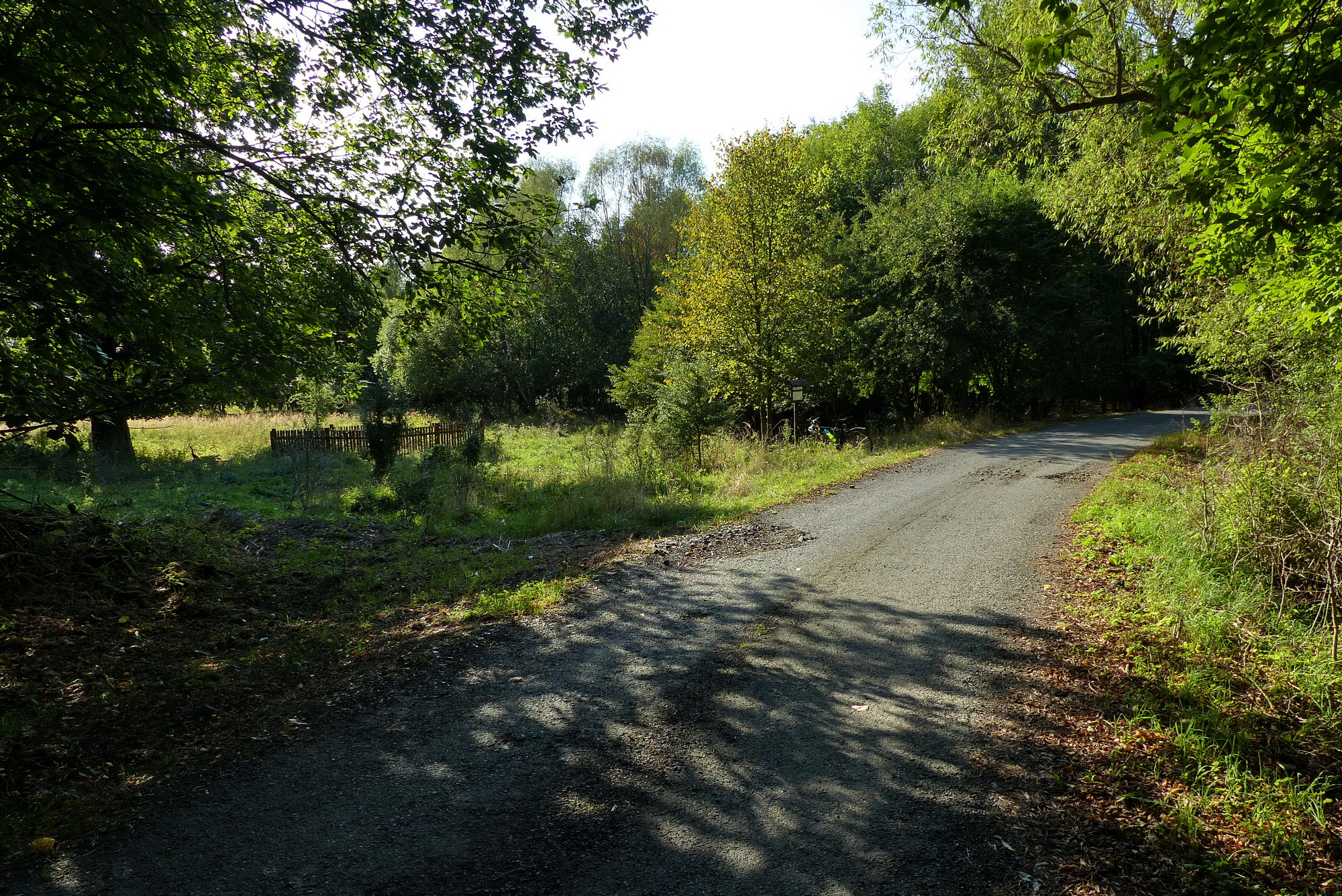
Road leading through Olšina

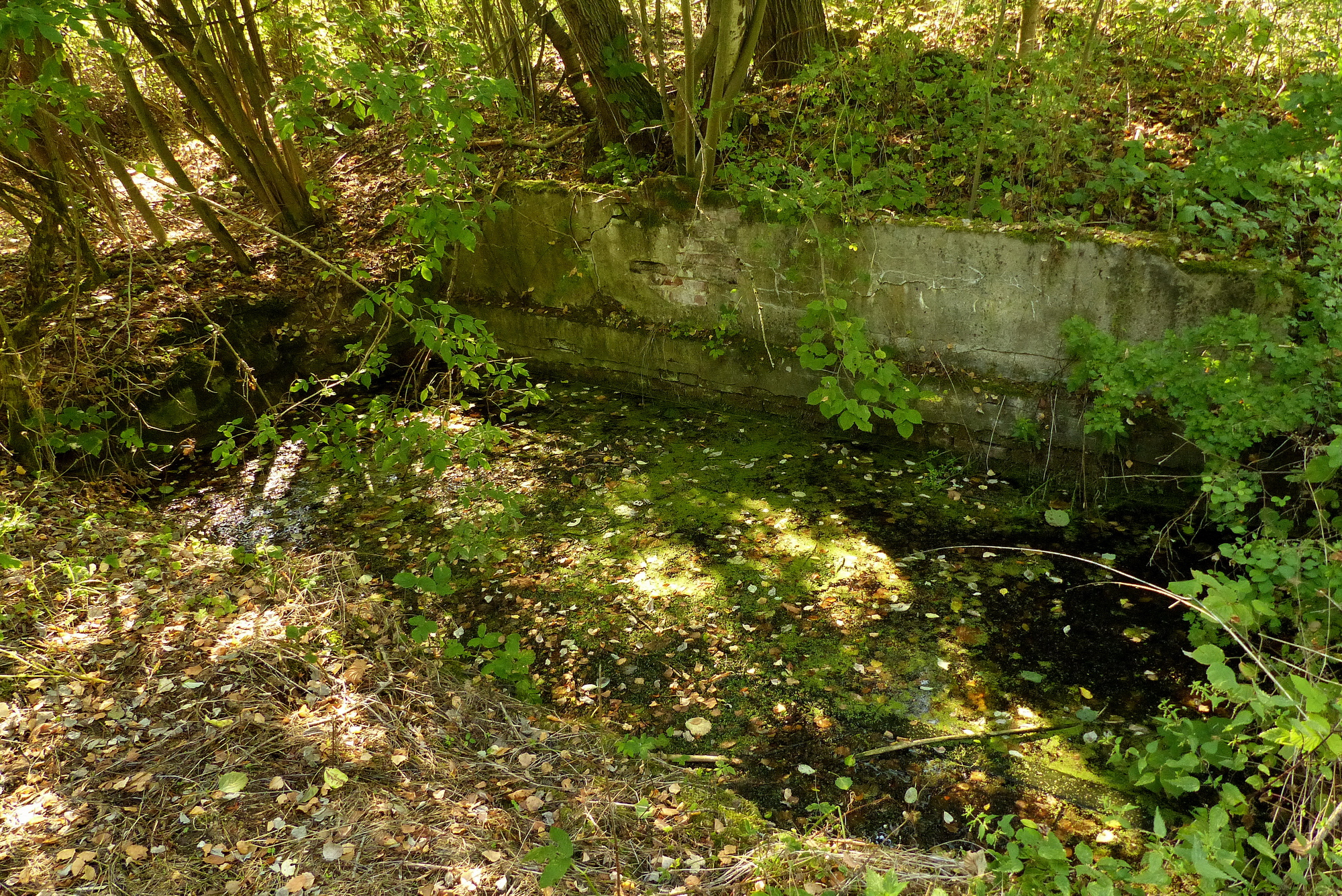
Remnants of a water tank in the former village of Olšina

Olšina (German: Wolschen or Wolsina) is an extinct village in Ralsko in the Česká Lípa District in the Czech Republic. It lies in the former Ralsko military training area, about 13 kilometres east of Mimoň.

== History ==
The founding of the village is vague. There is a legend that a farmer named Josef Rusitschka (or Ružička) discovered a large stash of Meissen groschen coins dating from the 15th century in the area. If true, then these coins may have been hidden or lost during the Hussite Wars, (Meissen was a Principality in modern-day Saxony that existed in the late Middle-Ages). Other historians cite the Kirschner Family as the founders of the settlement, but when exactly is unknown. Olšina was in a remote, thickly-forested and rocky region east of Niemes(Mimoň), and most-likely had only indirect contact with noble Bohemian Families such as the Wartenburgs or the Waldsteins.

The village was populated by both German-speaking and Czech-speaking Bohemians. In the mid-19th century, Wolschen/Olšina became part of the judicial district of Niemes for the Habsburg Crownland of Bohemia (and later for Austria-Hungary). This district included 26 small villages in a large wooded area east of Niemes/Mimoň.

In the early 1900s, Wolschen had 46 houses and 214 inhabitants, (mainly German-speaking with only a few Czechs). Agriculture, livestock and forestry were the main sources of livelihood. There was a church, a water pond, a school, three inns, two shops with several craftsmen and merchants. The village also had its own gendarmerie (sheriff), telephone connection, post office, brickyard, steam-powered sawmill and a milk dairy with a high chimney. The village was wired for electricity around 1922. The nearest railway station was at Niemes/Mimoň.

After World War II, in 1947, Wolschen and the other villages in the area became part of the Ralsko military training area for decades. Most of the villages in this restricted area were destroyed. The military testing area was shut down in 1991 after Czechoslovakia's Velvet Revolution. Plans were being made to turn the area into a natural reserve/tourist area. There are only scant remnants of the village today.
