= Marie Köstler =

Austrian nurse, trade unionist and politician (1879–1965)

Member of the Austrian National Council
- In office 2 December 1930 – 17 February 1934

Member of the Landtag of Styria
- In office 1920–1930

Personal details
- Born: 21 November 1879 Niemes, Bohemia, Austria-Hungary
- Died: November 1965 (aged 85–86) Austria
- Party: Social Democratic Party of Austria (SDAPÖ); Communist Party of Austria (KPÖ)
- Other political affiliations: League of Austrian Socialists in Great Britain; Free Austrian Movement (FAM); Association of Democratic Women (BDF)

Marie Köstler (née Mattauch, 21 November 1879 – November 1965), also known as Maria or Marie Koestler, was an Austrian nurse, trade unionist and politician. As a member of the Social Democratic Party of Austria (SDAPÖ), she was elected to the Landtag of Styria in 1920 and was elected to the National Council in 1930. She was expelled from Austria in 1934 and lived in exile in London during World War II, where she co-founded the League of Austrian Socialists in Great Britain. She returned to Austria after the end of the war and joined the Communist Party of Austria (KPÖ).

== Biography ==
Köstler was born on 21 November 1879 in Niemes, Bohemia, Austria-Hungary (now Mimoň in the Czech Republic). She grew up with her grandparents as a child (as her father died and her mother was unwell) and moved to Vienna to live with her maternal aunt after her grandfather died. In 1897, she married a Viennese municipal employee.

During World War I, Köstler trained as a nurse and worked in a military hospital in Styria then in the Red Cross regional office in Styria. She founded a nurses' union in Graz in 1917 and was secretary until trade unions were banned in 1934.

As a member of the Social Democratic Party of Austria (SDAPÖ), in 1920, Köstler was elected to the Landtag of Styria (Styrian State Parliament), where she served until 1930. Köstler served as the delegate from Styria to the 1926 Women's Reich Conference. She was chair of the Styrian Women's Regional Committee of the SDAPÖ, succeeding Martha Tausk.

At the 1930 Austrian legislative election, she was elected to the Austrian National Council, serving during the fourth legislative period. Köstler was arrested in February 1934 for "high treason," was imprisoned in Graz for a few weeks and was expelled from Austria. She emigrated to London, England.

Köstler remained politically active as a political émigré and co-founded the League of Austrian Socialists in Great Britain in London with Annie Hatschek. She argued that a broad coalition had to be forged on the political left to win the war against fascism and Nazi Germany. She also participated in the May Day rally of the working-class groups of the Free Austrian Movement (FAM) at Conway Hall in London in 1942.

After the allied victory and end of World War II in Europe, Köstler returned to Austria in 1945 and joined the Communist Party of Austria (KPÖ) in 1946. She became a member of the Central Committee of the KPÖ and a member of the Association of Democratic Women (BDF).

Köstler retired in 1954. She died in November 1965.
