= Rudolf Watzke =

German opera singer

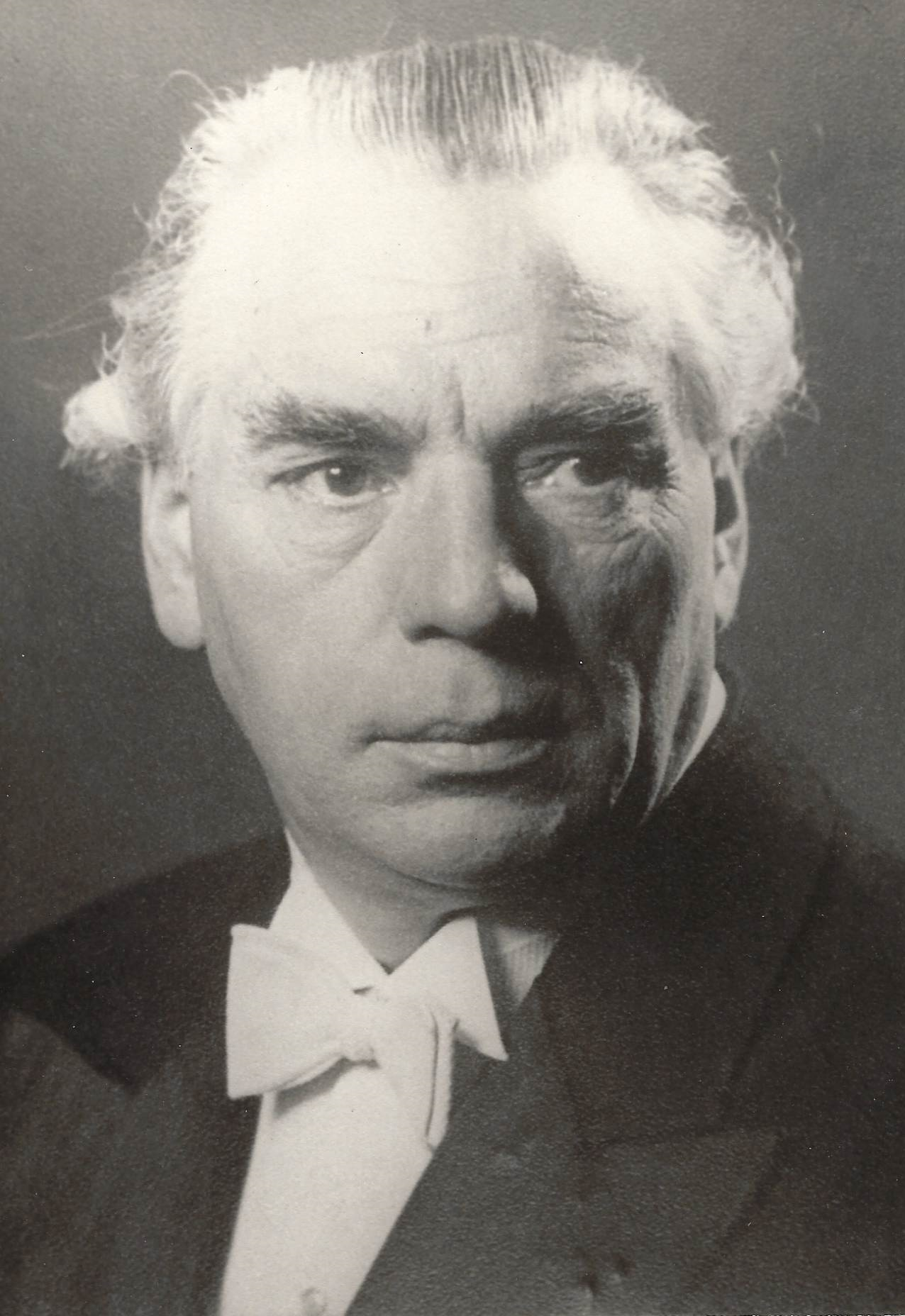
Rudolf Watzke (1965)

Rudolf Watzke (5 April 1892 in Niemes, now Mimoň, Bohemia – 18 December 1972 in Wuppertal) was an operatic and concert bass singer.

He sang from 1924 to 1928 at the Berliner Staatsoper|Berlin State Opera, and later sang and taught voice in Dortmund. He was a prominent singer in German oratorios, operas and concerts. Some of his performances were recorded, and are still available on vinyl records and CDs.

He sang live in Beethoven's Ninth Symphony with the Berlin Philharmonic on March 22, 1942, under Wilhelm Furtwängler, with Tilla Briem, Elisabeth Höngen, Peter Anders and the Bruno Kittel Choir (issued on labels Vox Turnabout, Classica d'Oro, Music and Arts, Opus Kura, Tahra, SWF). Video footage of this concert survived, and is still available to the public. It was performed in anticipation of Adolf Hitler's 53rd birthday the following April 20. In 2007, a memorial plaque was unveiled to Rudolf Watzke.

== Biography ==
Rudolf Watzke was the son of Josef Watzke, a room painter and painter who married in Mimona of Jablonné v Podještědí (then Deutsch Gabel) to see a certain Johanna Teifelová of Mimona.

Rudolf Watzke was born on April 5, 1892, in Mimona at No. 13 / I in today's Pražská Street. After graduating from national and burgher school, he learned his father's craft, which he also practiced. He went through the First World War and then continued his craft. He liked to sing at work and there was no sign that he would stand on the boards that signify the world. It is now known that Emil Kühnel, the music director of the church choir, was responsible for his discovery, who recommended him for further singing training with the prominent Croatian singer Drage Kreißl - Hauptfeld in Liberec. This is where his distinguished singing career began. Rudolf Watzke very quickly understood his mission, which he decided to undertake. He was a very diligent student who had war experience and 2.5 years of Russian captivity in World War I.

He then studied in Bayreuth, where he was supported by the wealthy family of Siegfried Wagner, then studied singing with Professor Karel Kittel and then underwent teaching at Bankhort in Karlsruhe. In 1923 he was allowed to perform as a singer for the first time at the Bayreuth Festival, where he was very interested in the present Max von Schillings, who won Rudolf Watzke for the Berlin State Opera from 1924 to 1928. After that he performed only as a singer of oratorios and concerts. He was the first radio singer in Berlin in the so-called "Vox House". This was followed by a long singing tour to Scandinavia, Budapest, Sofia, Athens, Rome, Paris and other major European cities. He sang in front of the Italian queen Eleonora and Princess Maria, he also sang in front of Pope Pius XII.

He has received a large number of awards and honors. He especially enjoyed singing Schubert and Handel's compositions. At home, that is, in the Czech Republic, he became an honorary member of many German choirs, as well as of various associations and communities, of course in Mimoň. He was also a guest on the stage of the forest theater in Mimona. To support the purchase of a new organ for the St. Peter and Paul Church in Mimoň, he organized a benefit concert in Mimona.

After joining the State Opera in Berlin, Rudolf Watzke lived here until 1942, when he moved back to his homeland, he lived in Liberec, from where he was displaced in 1946 as a German from Czechoslovakia to Bremen. His family stayed in Liberec. In 1948 he met his family again in Bremen, but soon the family came from moved to Wuppertal. He died shortly after his 80th birthday party on December 18, 1972, in Wuppertal.

Rudolf Watzke was twice married. He was to marry for the first time on October 2, 1918, to Marta Morndl from Vratislavice near Liberec. His second wife was Liliana Christova from Sofia, who was the daughter of a Bulgarian composer. Liliana was an excellent and talented pianist who played concerts at the age of eight and later studied music in Leipzig. Watzke met Lilian in Paris at a concert with German Ambassador Hoesch, where she accompanied him on the piano. Two children, a son and a daughter, were to be born from this marriage. His personal hobbies include fishing, driving, photography and dog breeding.
