= Ralsko Uplands =

Mountain range in the Czech Republic

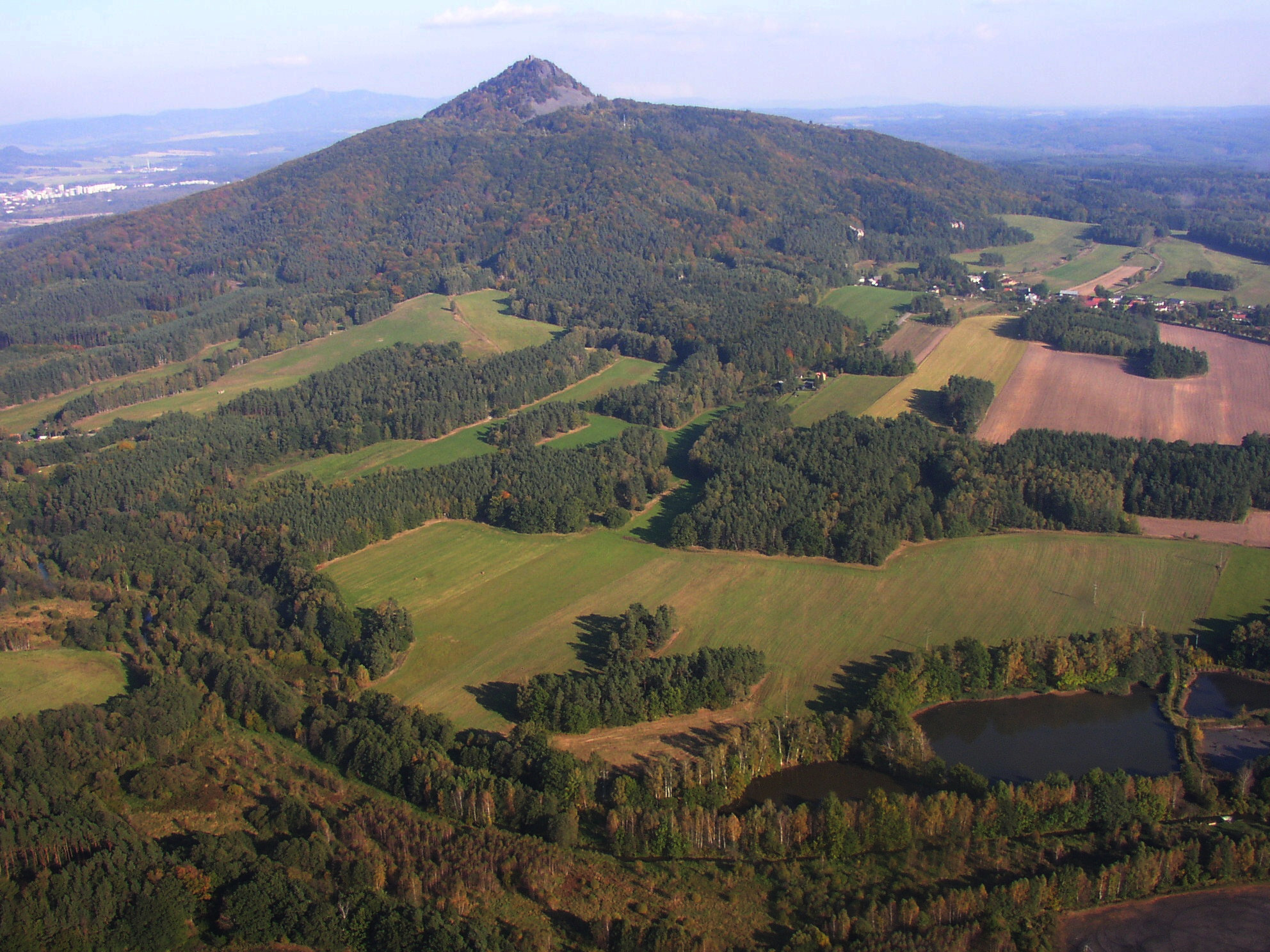
- Ralsko, the highest peak

Highest point
- Peak: Ralsko
- Elevation: 698 m (2,290 ft)

Dimensions
- Length: 60 km (37 mi)
- Area: 1,356 km^{2} (524 mi^{2})

Geography
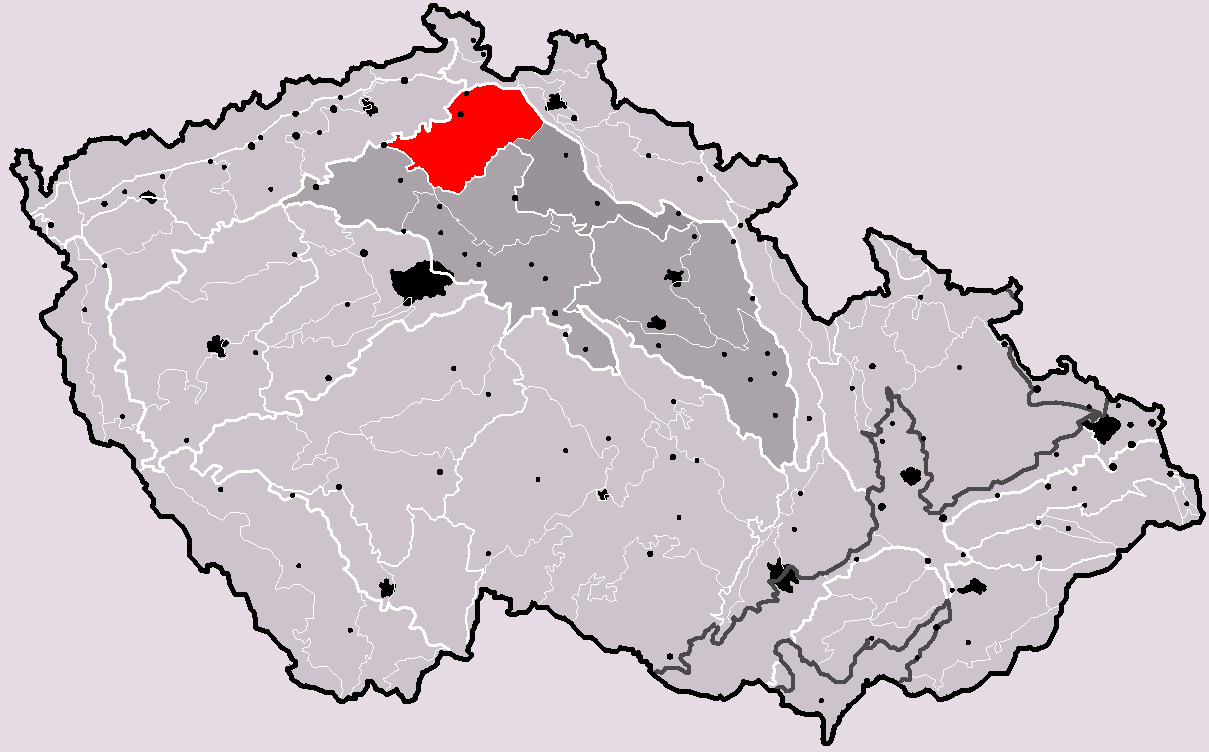
- Ralsko Uplands in the geomorphological system of the Czech Republic
- Country: Czech Republic
- Regions: Liberec, Ústí nad Labem, Central Bohemian
- Range coordinates: 50°37′N 14°37′E
- Parent range: North Bohemian Table

Geology
- Rock type(s): Quartz sandstone, marlstone

The Ralsko Uplands (Czech: Ralská pahorkatina) are uplands and a geomorphological mesoregion of the Czech Republic. It is located in the Liberec, Ústí nad Labem and Central Bohemian regions.

== Geomorphology ==
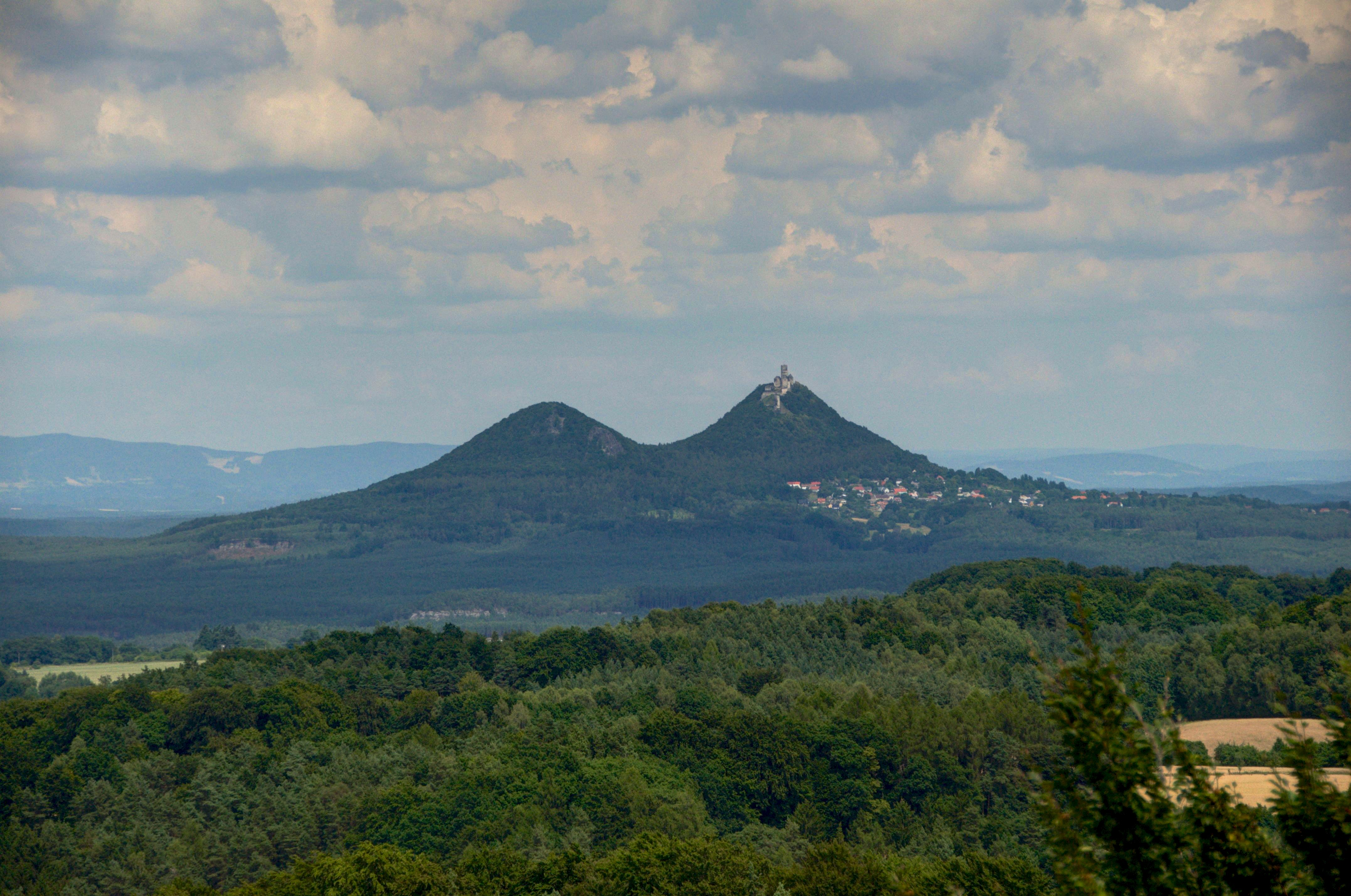
Bezděd and Malý Bezděz, the most prominent hills

The Ralsko Uplands are a mesoregion of the North Bohemian Table within the Bohemian Massif. Four types of formations predominate in the landscape: volcanic (basaltic) inselbergs, flat-bottomed basins, sandstone structural formations with rock formations, and medium relief with acidic brown soils. The uplands are further subdivided into the microregions of Doksy Uplands and Zákupy Uplands.

There are a lot of medium-high hills. The highest point is Ralsko, whose new measured altitude is 698 m (2,290 ft). The elevations are the highest within the sub-province of the Bohemian Table. The uplands are thus a transition between lowland areas in the south (Lower Ohře Table, Jizera Table) and between mountain ranges in the north (Lusatian Mountains, Central Bohemian Uplands, Ještěd–Kozákov Ridge). The highest peaks are located in the northern part of the territory. The highest peaks of the Ralsko Uplands are:

- Ralsko, 698 m (2,290 ft)
- Jezevčí vrch, 666 m (2,185 ft)
- Vlhošť, 614 m (2,014 ft)
- Bezděz, 606 m (1,988 ft)
- Tlustec, 592 m (1,942 ft)
- Zelený vrch, 586 m (1,923 ft)
- Malý Bezděz, 577 m (1,893 ft)
- Mazova horka, 569 m (1,867 ft)
- Holubník, 562 m (1,844 ft)
- Ortel, 554 m (1,818 ft)

== Geography ==
The territory has a relatively regular shape and stretches from southwest to northeast. The region has an area of 1,356 square kilometres (524 sq mi) and an average elevation of 318 m (1,043 ft).

The territory is drained by the Ploučnice River and by small right-handed tributaries of the Elbe. There are no other notable rivers, but there are many middle-sized streams. The Elbe flows just beyond the southwestern border of the Ralsko Uplands. The largest body of water is Lake Mácha.

The most populated settlements located in whole or in large part in the territory are Česká Lípa, Nový Bor, Mimoň, Doksy and Stráž pod Ralskem.

== Geology ==
The uplands are formed by Late Cretaceous kaolinic, clayey and calcareous quartz sandstones, and to a lesser extent marlstones and sandy marlstones.

== Nature ==
The territory alternates between forested and agricultural landscapes. Almost the entire area of the Kokořínsko – Máchův kraj Protected Landscape Area lies within the Ralsko Uplands, located in the southern and central parts of the uplands. In the north, the Lužické hory and České středohoří protected landscape areas extend into the territory. A large part of the Ralsko Uplands in the southeast has an intact and uninhabited landscape due to the existence of the former Ralsko military training area.

== Gallery ==
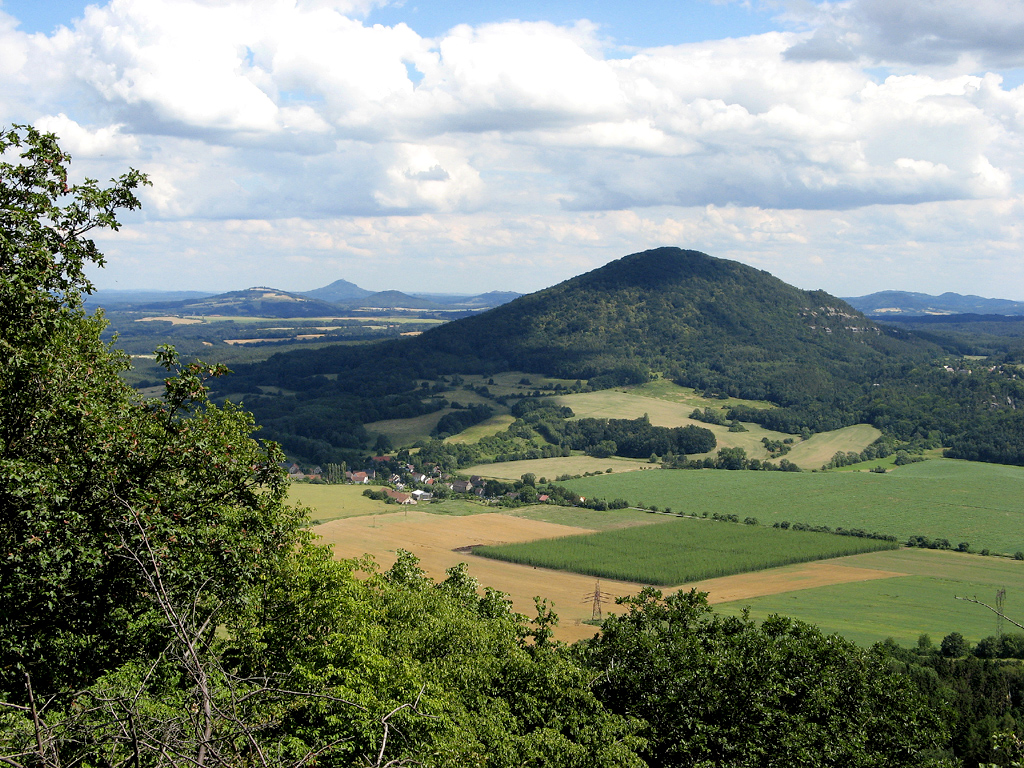
Vlhošť as seen from the Ronov hill

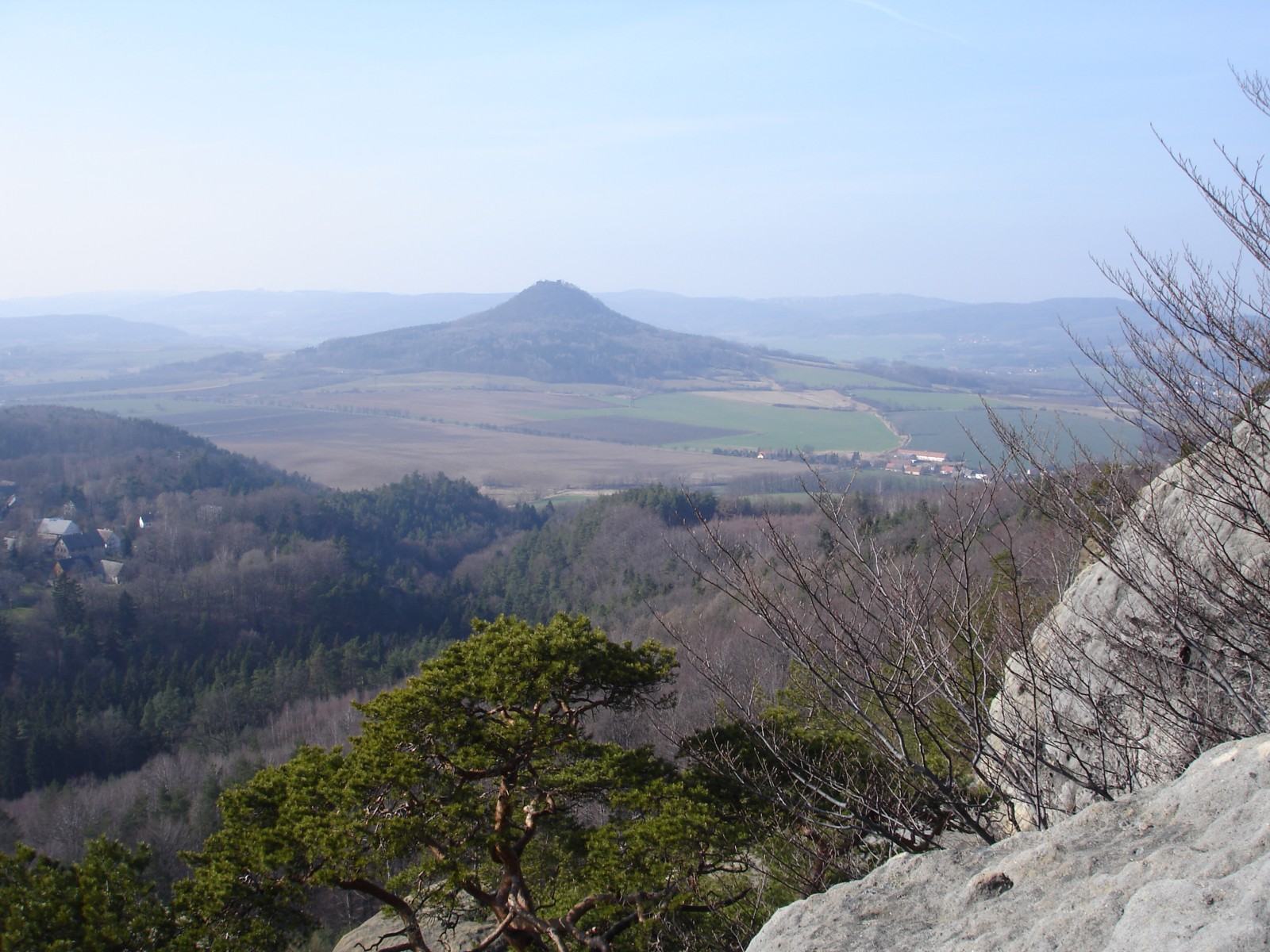
Ronov as seen from Vlhošť

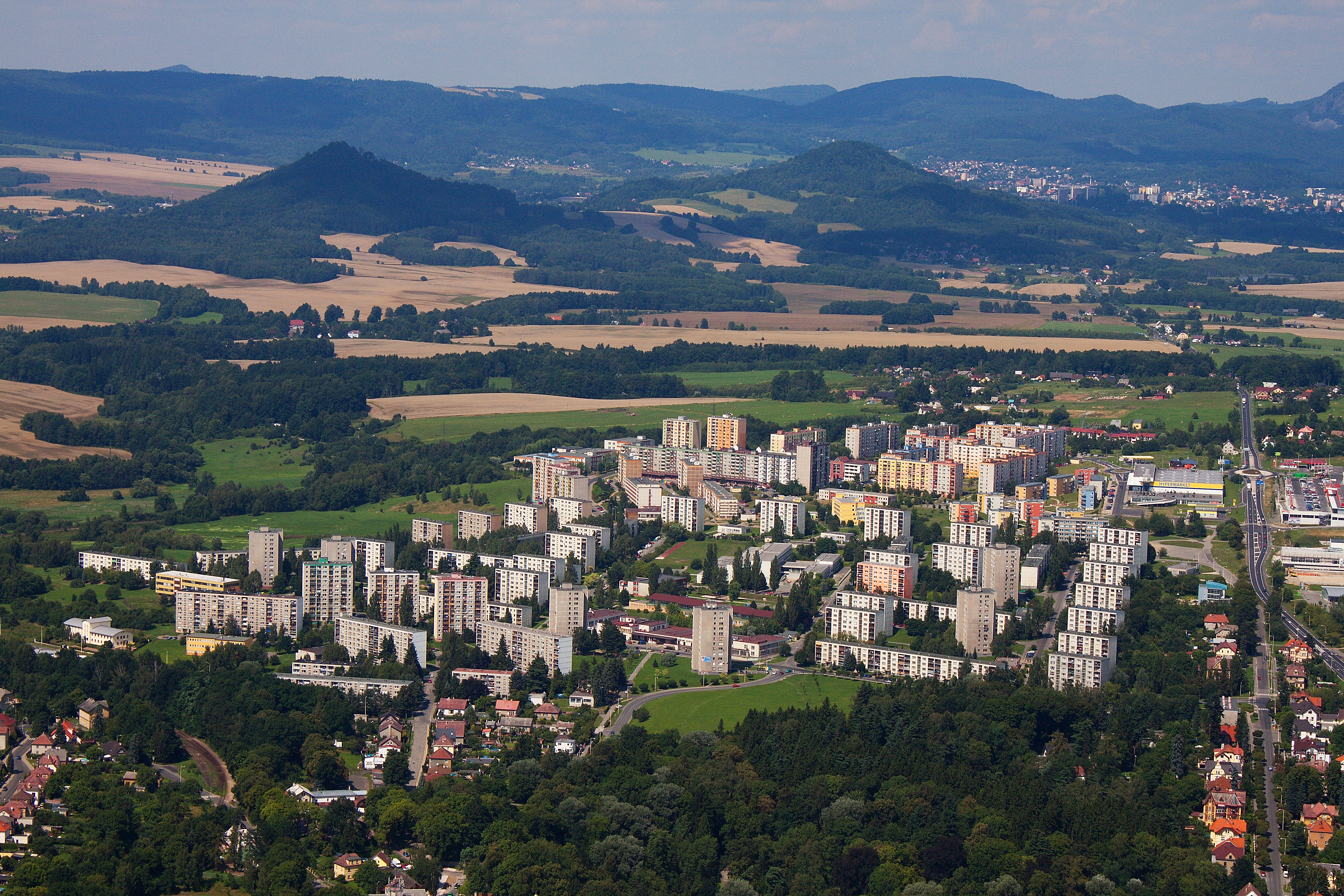
Northern part of Česká Lípa

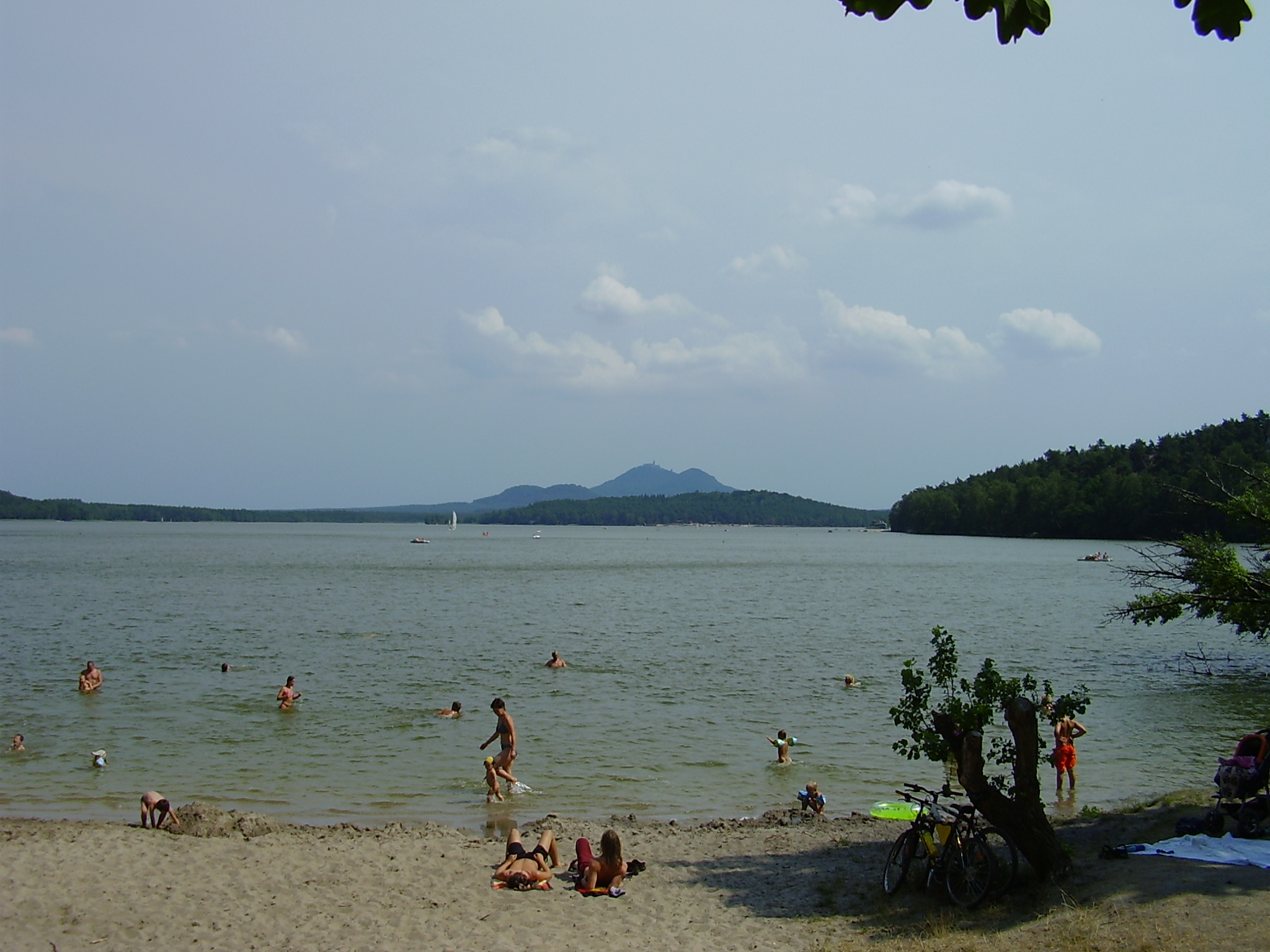
Lake Mácha

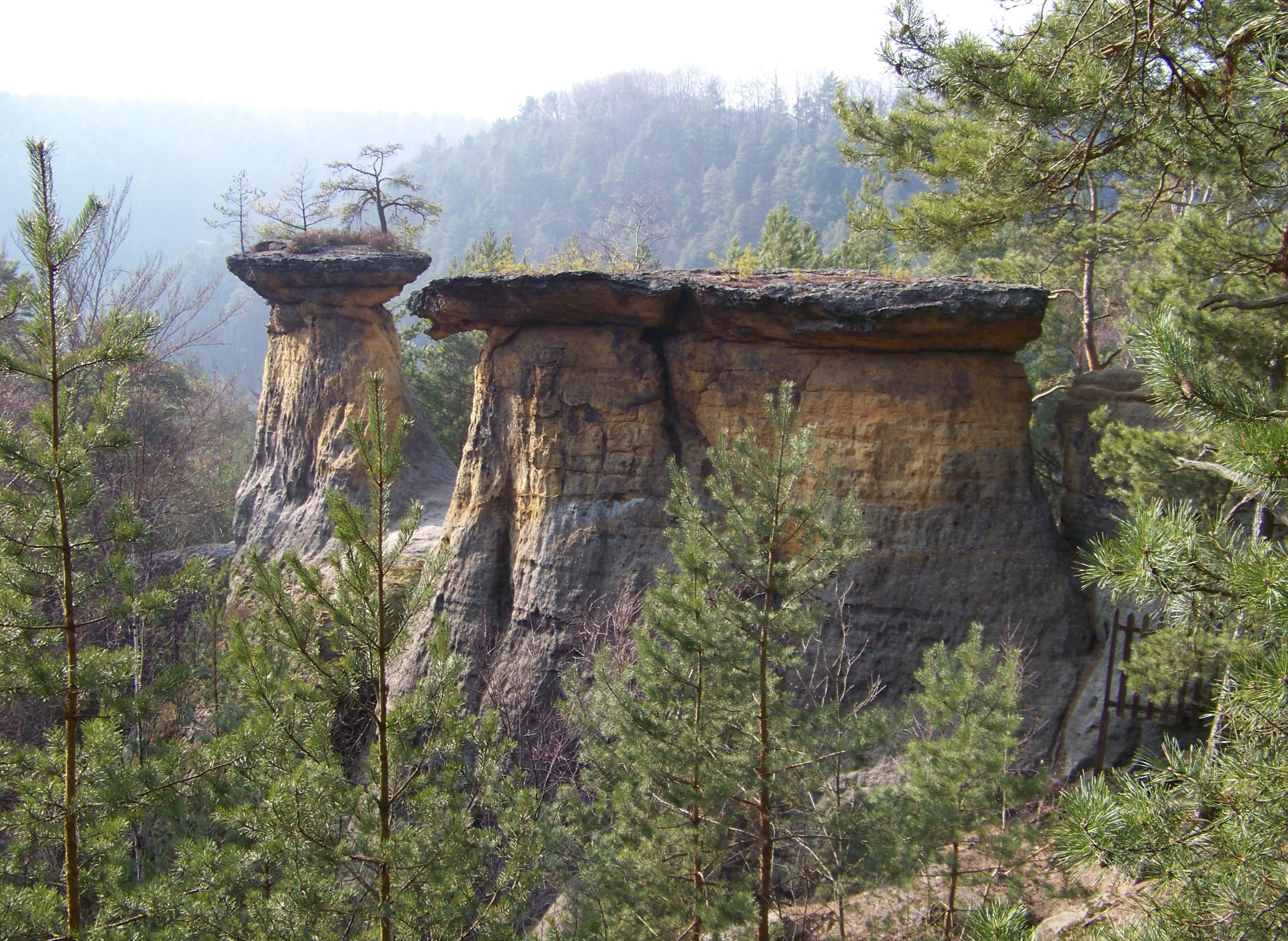
Pokličky rock
