= Ralsko =

- Town
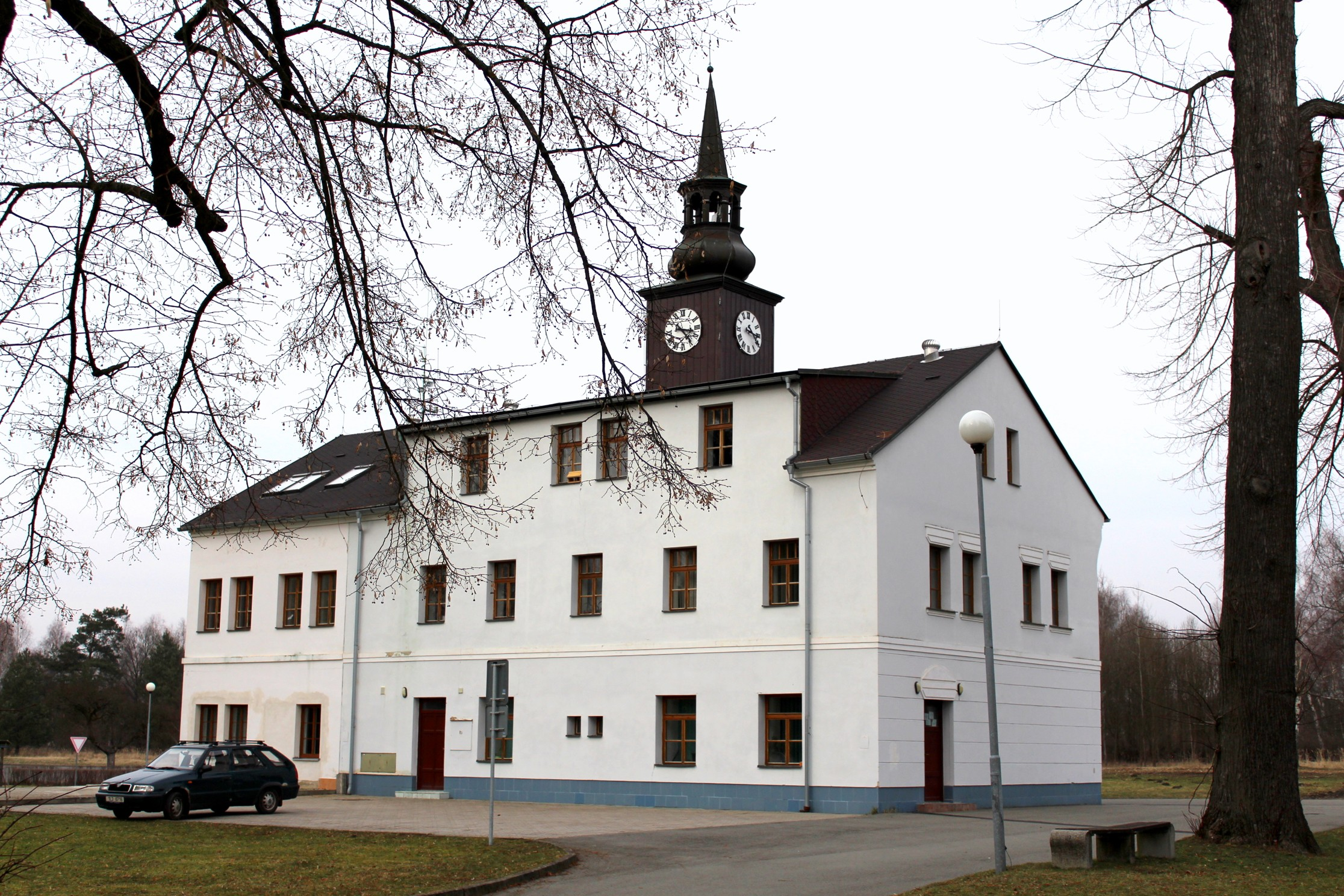
- Town hall

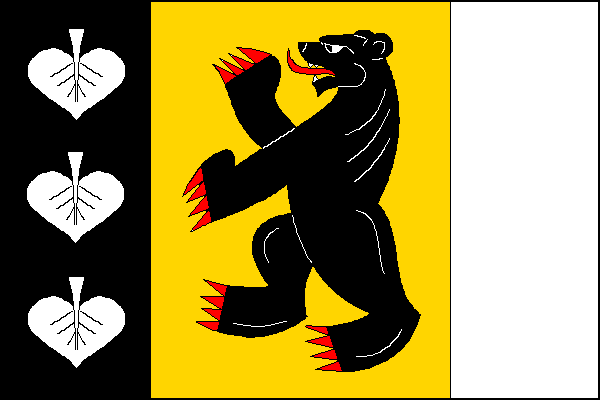
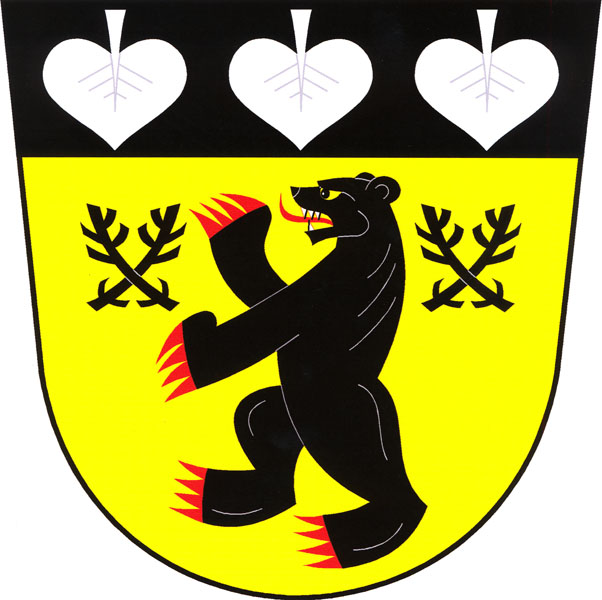
- Flag Coat of arms

- Location in the Czech Republic
- Coordinates: 50°36′45″N 14°47′27″E
- Country: Czech Republic
- Region: Liberec
- District: Česká Lípa
- First mentioned: 1279

Government
  - Mayor: Miloslav Tůma

Area
  - Total: 170.23 km^{2} (65.73 sq mi)
- Elevation: 331 m (1,086 ft)

Population (2026-01-01)
  - Total: 2,209
  - Density: 12.98/km^{2} (33.61/sq mi)
- Time zone: UTC+1 (CET)
  - Summer (DST): UTC+2 (CEST)
- Postal codes: 295 01, 463 52, 471 24
- Website: mestoralsko.cz

Ralsko (Czech pronunciation: [ˈralsko]; German: Roll) is a town in Česká Lípa District in the Liberec Region of the Czech Republic. It has about 2,200 inhabitants. The town is located in the Ralsko Uplands. It comprises the area of the former Ralsko Military Training Area with Hradčany Air Base, which makes Ralsko the fourth largest municipality in the country by area.

== Administrative division ==
Ralsko consists of nine municipal parts (in brackets population according to the 2021 census):

- Boreček (65)
- Horní Krupá (41)
- Hradčany (156)
- Hvězdov (140)
- Jabloneček (0)
- Kuřívody (606)
- Náhlov (107)
- Ploužnice (955)
- Svébořice (17)

The town hall is located in Kuřívody.

== Etymology ==
The town is named after the mountain Ralsko. The mountain was initially named Radlsko, meaning "belonging to a place called Rádlo".

== Geography ==
Ralsko is located about 21 km (13 mi) southeast of Česká Lípa and 25 km (16 mi) southwest of Liberec. It lies in the Ralsko Uplands. The highest point of Ralsko and the entire Ralsko Uplands in the Ralsko mountain at 696 m (2,283 ft) above sea level, located on the northern municipal border. The Ploučnice River shortly crosses the municipal territory in the northeast. There are several fishonds in the area, the largest of which are Hradčanský rybník and Novodvorský rybník.

Because of the former military area, the town's municipal territory is 170.23 km^{2} (65.73 sq mi), which makes it the fourth largest municipality in the country after the cities of Prague, Brno and Ostrava.

== History ==
The oldest part of Ralsko is Kuřívody. The first written mention of Kuřívody is from 1279. It was founded between 1264 and 1278 by King Ottokar II as a royal town. Due to lack of water, it remained a small town throughout its existence.

Before 1945, there was more than 7,000 inhabitants in today's Ralsko area, with ethnic German forming a majority. At the beginning of 1945, Hradčany Air Base was built by German army. After World War II, the German-speaking population was expelled.

In 1950, the Ralsko Military Training Area was established. In 1992, it was abolished and the municipality of Ralsko was established. In 2006, Ralsko became a town.

=== Ralsko Military Training Area ===
Between 1946 and 1950, the inhabitants were relocated to establish a military training area in surroundings of the mountain Ralsko. The displacement of the population was completed on 31 October 1952. More than 3,000 inhabitants were evicted from the villages.

The mountain Ralsko and the airfield were used as a military weapons-testing area for decades. After the Prague Spring of 1968, the installation was manned by Soviet Troops. In the late 1980s the Soviet 442nd Missile Brigade stationed SS-21 short-range tactical missiles at Hvězdov. It 1988, there was more than 20,000 permanent Soviet inhabitants (soldiers and their families) in the area. After the collapse of the Soviet Union in 1990–1991, the missiles were withdrawn and the entire weapons-testing area was closed off.

== Demographics ==
Historical population

Year	Pop.	±%
1869	7,861	—
1880	7,418	−5.6%
1890	6,871	−7.4%
1900	6,410	−6.7%
1910	6,322	−1.4%

Year	Pop.	±%
1921	6,065	−4.1%
1930	5,862	−3.3%
1950	3,250	−44.6%
1961	831	−74.4%
1970	768	−7.6%

Year	Pop.	±%
1980	571	−25.7%
1991	524	−8.2%
2001	1,386	+164.5%
2011	1,954	+41.0%
2021	2,087	+6.8%

Source: Censuses

== Transport ==
Despite its large area, there are no railways or major roads passing through the municipal territory.

== Sights ==
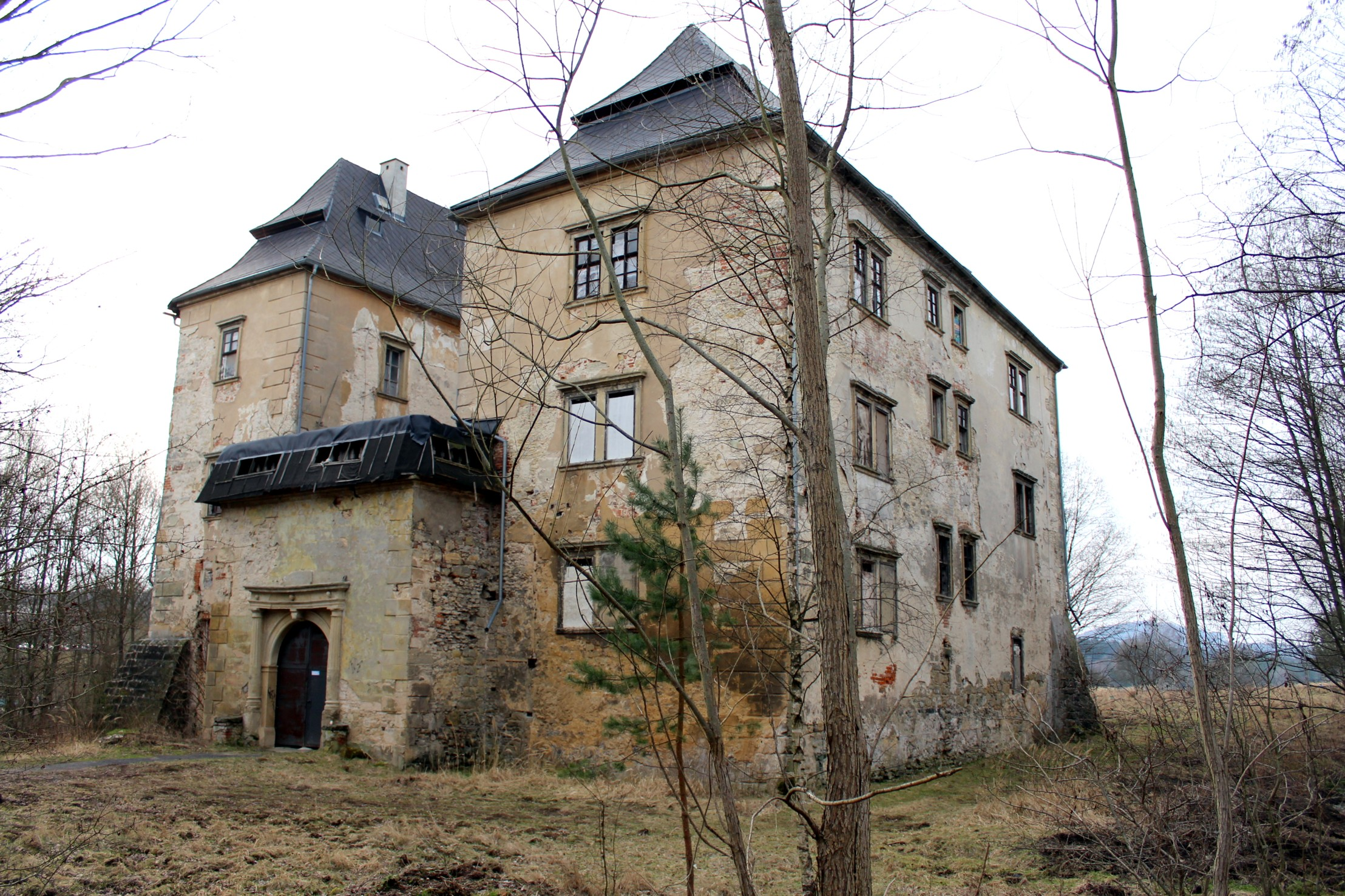
Kuřívody Castle

Many of the discarded Czech and Soviet munitions were collected and are now on display at a little museum in Kuřívody. Only recently has the former military training area been opened as a nature reserve. On the mountain Ralsko is a ruin of a Gothic castle. It has been desolate since the 16th century.

There is a Renaissance castle in Kuřívody, formerly a fortress.
