= Hradčany Air Base =

Hradčany Airport Letiště Hradčany
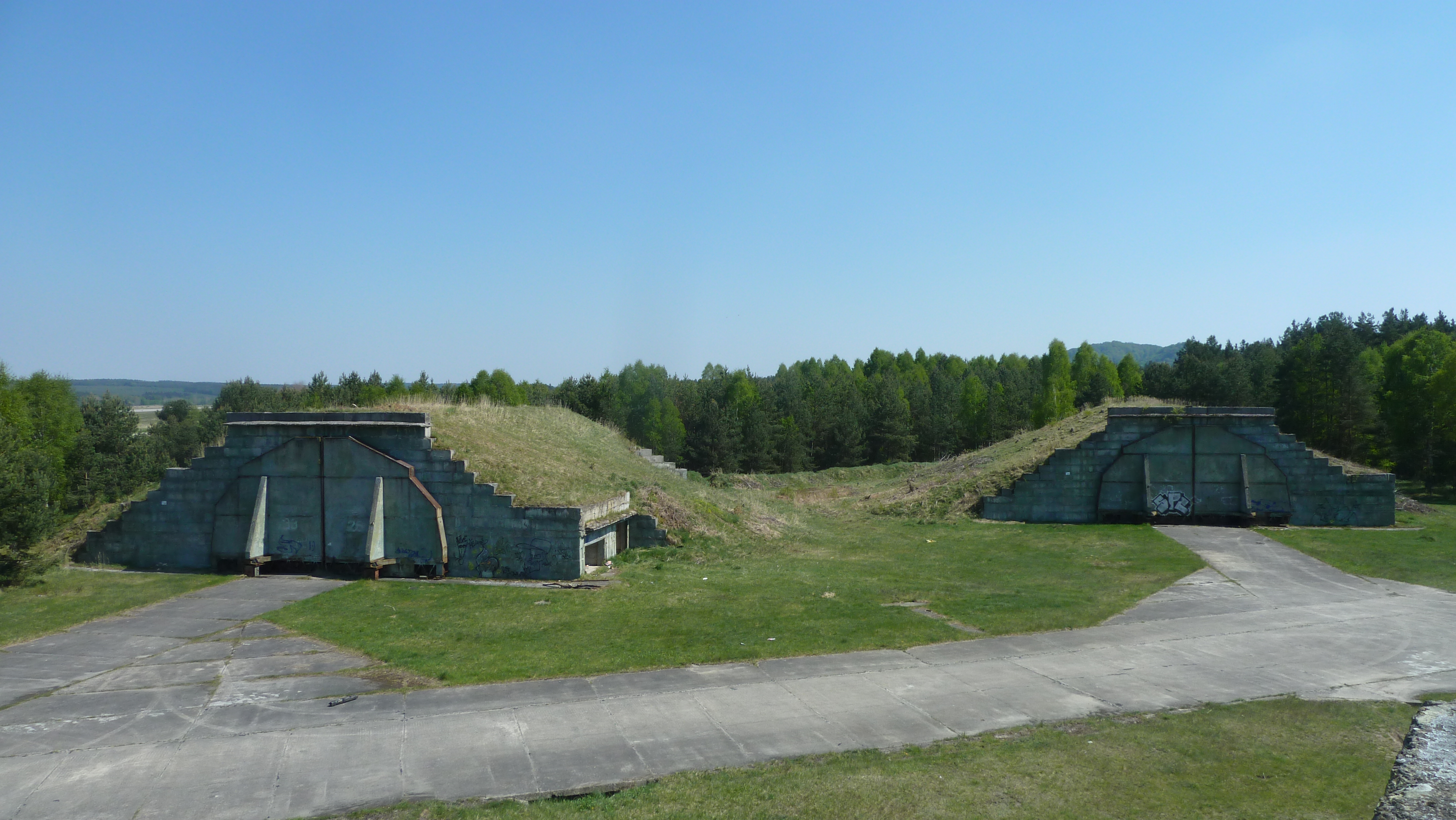
- Hangars of the base
- IATA: none; ICAO: LKHR

Summary
- Airport type: Military
- Location: Ralsko (Česká Lípa District)
- Elevation AMSL: 278 m (912 ft)
- Coordinates: 50°37′14″N 14°44′17″E

Map
- Location of airport in Czech Republic Hradčany Airport (Europe)

Runways
Direction	Length		Surface
Direction	ft	m	Surface
09L/27R	9,186	2,800	Concrete

Hradčany Airport (in Czech Letiště Hradčany, often Letiště Ralsko) is a former military airport within the area of Ralsko in Liberec Region, northern Czech Republic. Built toward the end of World War II for the Luftwaffe, it was expanded after the war. In 1968 the Soviet Army took control and set up a large air base here. However, after the Soviets left in 1991, the airport was abandoned and it is now neglected and damaged.

== History ==
The area was used for military training during Austria-Hungary and during the First Republic of Czechoslovakia. Since 1938 the area was controlled by the Wehrmacht and used for training. In March 1945 the Wehrmacht built a field airport next to village Hradčany (Kummer). By April 1945 Stab and II./SG 2 of Luftwaffe's Schlachtgeschwader 2 were based here, while its I./SG 2 was in Austria, and III./SG 2 near Prague. The airport was also used by a wing of Messerschmitt Me 262 at the end of the war, and later damaged by American bombing.

After the war, German speaking inhabitants were expelled. On 30 October 1946 the Czechoslovak Army closed up the area and established military base, later known as Military District Ralsko (Vojenský újezd Ralsko). In 1968, during the initial phases of Soviet occupation of Czechoslovakia, Soviet planes shipped military materiel through the airport. The whole base was handed over to the newly established Central Group of Forces of the Soviet Armed Forces. To host the Soviet 236th bomber-fighter squadron and part of the 131st air division the airport runway was expanded to 2,800 meters (width 60 m, one of the largest in Central Europe) and completely covered with concrete. Over forty hardened hangars hosted about 44 Mig-21 fighters and Mi-24 helicopters. Fuel tanks had capacity over 37,000 m^{3}.

Between 1945 and 1968 the Czechoslovak Air Force operated several regiments from Hradčany airfield:

- 46 Bomber Division (46 letecké bombardovací divize) between 1951 and 1955.
- 24 Bomber Regiment (24. letecký bombardovací pluk) between 1952 and 1954.
- 25 Bomber Regiment (25. letecký bombardovací pluk) between 1952 and 1954.
- 17 Fighter Regiment (17. stíhací letecký pluk) between 1955 and 1964.
- 26 Fighter Regiment (26. stíhací letecký pluk) between 1956 and 1958.
- 30 Fighter-Bomber Regiment (30. stíhací bombardovací letecký pluk) between 1958 and 1959.
- 2 Fighter-Bomber Regiment (2 stíhací bombardovací letecký pluk) between 1964 and 1968.

Aircraft operated from the airfield included Arado Ar-96Bs, AS-11s, and MiG-15 (MiG-15, MiG-15bisR and MiG-15UTI).

== Former airport ==
After the fall of the communist party from power in 1989, withdrawal of Soviet troops was negotiated in February 1990. The last soldier left the district in May 1991. The district lost its military status in the same year, was open to the public and on 1 January 1992 the village of Ralsko (area of 170 km^{2}, town since 2006) was established by joining of nine villages together. Between 1993 and 2004 the area was extensively cleaned up from chemical contamination and searched for unexploded ammunition.

Soon after the airport was handed over to Czech authorities several projects has been proposed: setting up large cargo terminal here, to use it by Rolls-Royce for engine tests, to attract a low-cost carrier or create a Czech Scout base for huge events such as a jamboree. Due to unwillingness and inability of the authorities none of the plans has materialized. The state was unable even to provide protection of existing structures and these became target of vandals and looters and were completely devastated during the 1990s.

The airport is now (without official certification) used by ultralight clubs, for unorganized car races and for rave parties. Newer plans propose to turn the location into a recreational area.

== Literature ==
- Ladislav Lahoda: Průvodce bývalým vojenským prostorem Ralsko (Guide through former military district Ralsko), 2000, selfpublished. Shortened version online (PDF).
