= Stráž pod Ralskem =

- Town
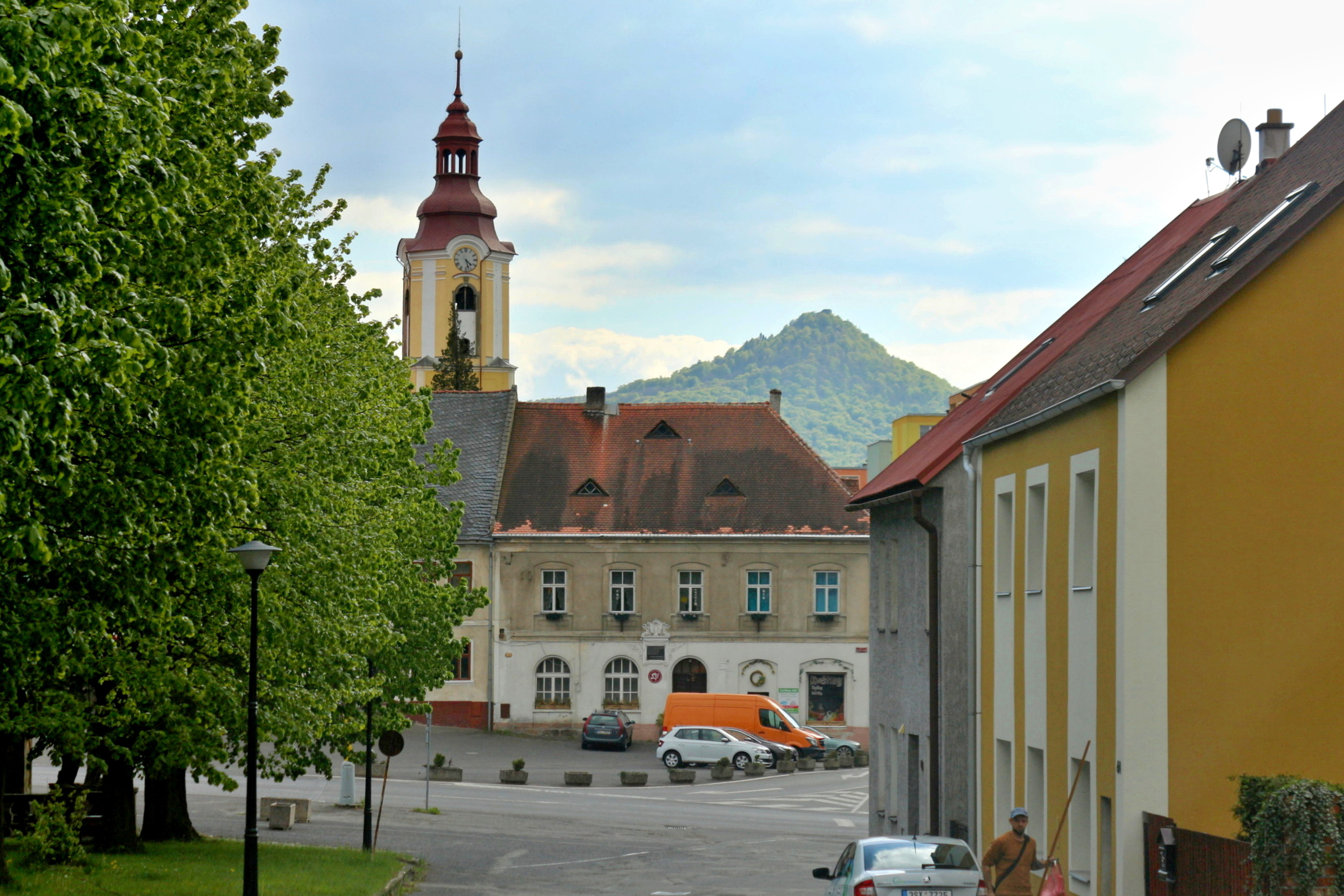
- The square Náměstí 5. května

- Flag Coat of arms

- Location in the Czech Republic
- Coordinates: 50°42′10″N 14°48′4″E
- Country: Czech Republic
- Region: Liberec
- District: Česká Lípa
- First mentioned: 1283

Government
  - Mayor: Zdeněk Hlinčík

Area
  - Total: 21.58 km^{2} (8.33 sq mi)
- Elevation: 310 m (1,020 ft)

Population (2026-01-01)
  - Total: 3,773
  - Density: 174.8/km^{2} (452.8/sq mi)
- Time zone: UTC+1 (CET)
  - Summer (DST): UTC+2 (CEST)
- Postal code: 471 27
- Website: www.strazpr.cz

Stráž pod Ralskem (Czech pronunciation: [ˈstraːʃ ˈpod ralskɛm]; until 1946 Vartenberk; German: Wartenberg (am Rollberg)) is a town in Česká Lípa District in the Liberec Region of the Czech Republic. It has about 3,800 inhabitants. The town is located on the Ploučnice River in the Ralsko Uplands.

Stráž pod Ralskem is known for a jailhouse. In the second half of the 20th century, it was known for uranium ore mining.

== Etymology ==
The local castle was called Wartenberg (derived from Warte auf Berge, meaning 'guard on the hill' in German). Vartenberk was the Czech transcription of the name. The modern Czech name of the town Stráž means 'guard' and the suffix pod Ralskem refers to its location below the mountain Ralsko.

== Geography ==
Stráž pod Ralskem is located about 18 kilometres (11 mi) east of Česká Lípa and 18 km (11 mi) southwest of Liberec. It lies in the Ralsko Uplands. The highest point is a nameless hill at 407 m (1,335 ft) above sea level (the mountain of Ralsko is located outside the municipal territory).

The Ploučnice River flows through the town. The town lies on the shores of Stráž pod Ralskem Reservoir. It was built in 1911–1913 and is one of the oldest reservoirs in the country. The reservoir has an area of 75.5 ha (187 acres) and is used for fish farming and water sports. There are also several fishponds around the town.

== History ==
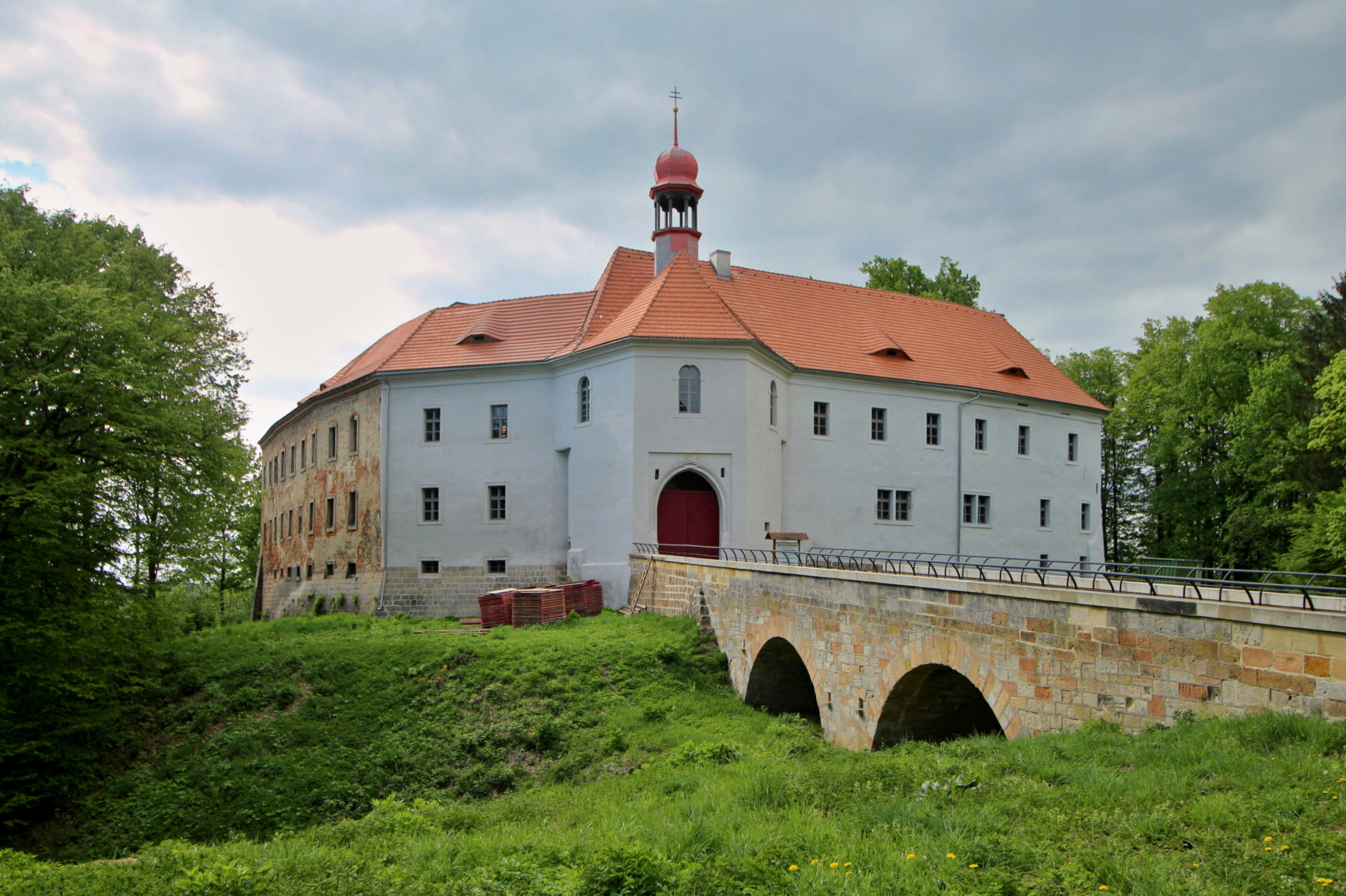
Vartenberk Castle

The first written mention is from 1283, when a castle was built here. The castle and the settlement were called Wartenberg/Vartenberk and their owners became known as the Vartenberk family. In 1504, the Vartenberk family sold the estate to Bartholomew Hirschpergar, who rebuilt the medieval Gothic castle into a comfortable aristocratic residence.

At the end of the 19th century, tourism began to develop and Stráž pod Ralskem turned into a resort. In 1963, uranium ore was found and tourism has partly given way to industrialisation. The uranium ore mining ended in 1996.

== Demographics ==
Historical population

Year	Pop.	±%
1869	1,661	—
1880	1,597	−3.9%
1890	1,384	−13.3%
1900	1,205	−12.9%
1910	1,117	−7.3%

Year	Pop.	±%
1921	1,066	−4.6%
1930	1,061	−0.5%
1950	869	−18.1%
1961	756	−13.0%
1970	898	+18.8%

Year	Pop.	±%
1980	2,476	+175.7%
1991	3,873	+56.4%
2001	4,028	+4.0%
2011	4,522	+12.3%
2021	4,377	−3.2%

Source: Censuses

== Economy ==
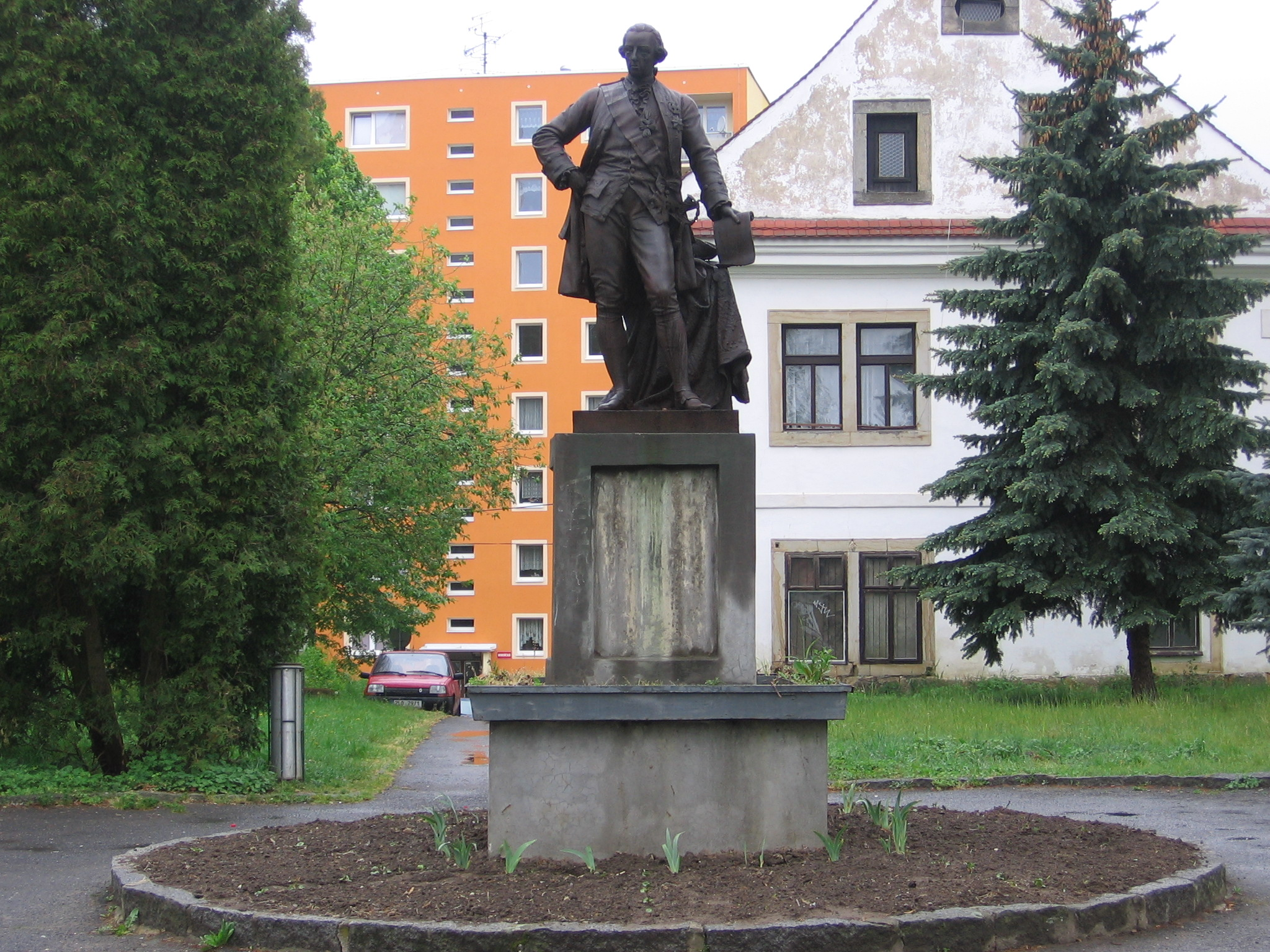
Statue of Joseph II in the town

Stráž pod Ralskem is known for its jailhouse. It was created in 1973 from the original hostels that were used for uranium mine workers. It employs around 300 people and has a capacity of 635 prisoners.

== Transport ==
There are no railways or major roads passing through the municipality.

== Sights ==
The Church of Saint Sigismund was built in the late Baroque style in 1772–1779. It was built on the site of an old medieval church, first documented in 1363.

The Vartenberk Castle was rebuilt into its present Renaissance form in 1563. After it was damaged by a fire in 1987, it was reconstructed in 2006.

== Notable people ==
- Heinrich Ignaz Franz Biber (1644–1704), Czech-Austrian composer
- Anton von Jaksch (1810–1887), Czech-Austrian medical doctor, rector of Charles University
