= Ralsko (mountain) =

Mountain in the Czech Republic

Coordinates: 50°40′27″N 14°45′55″E

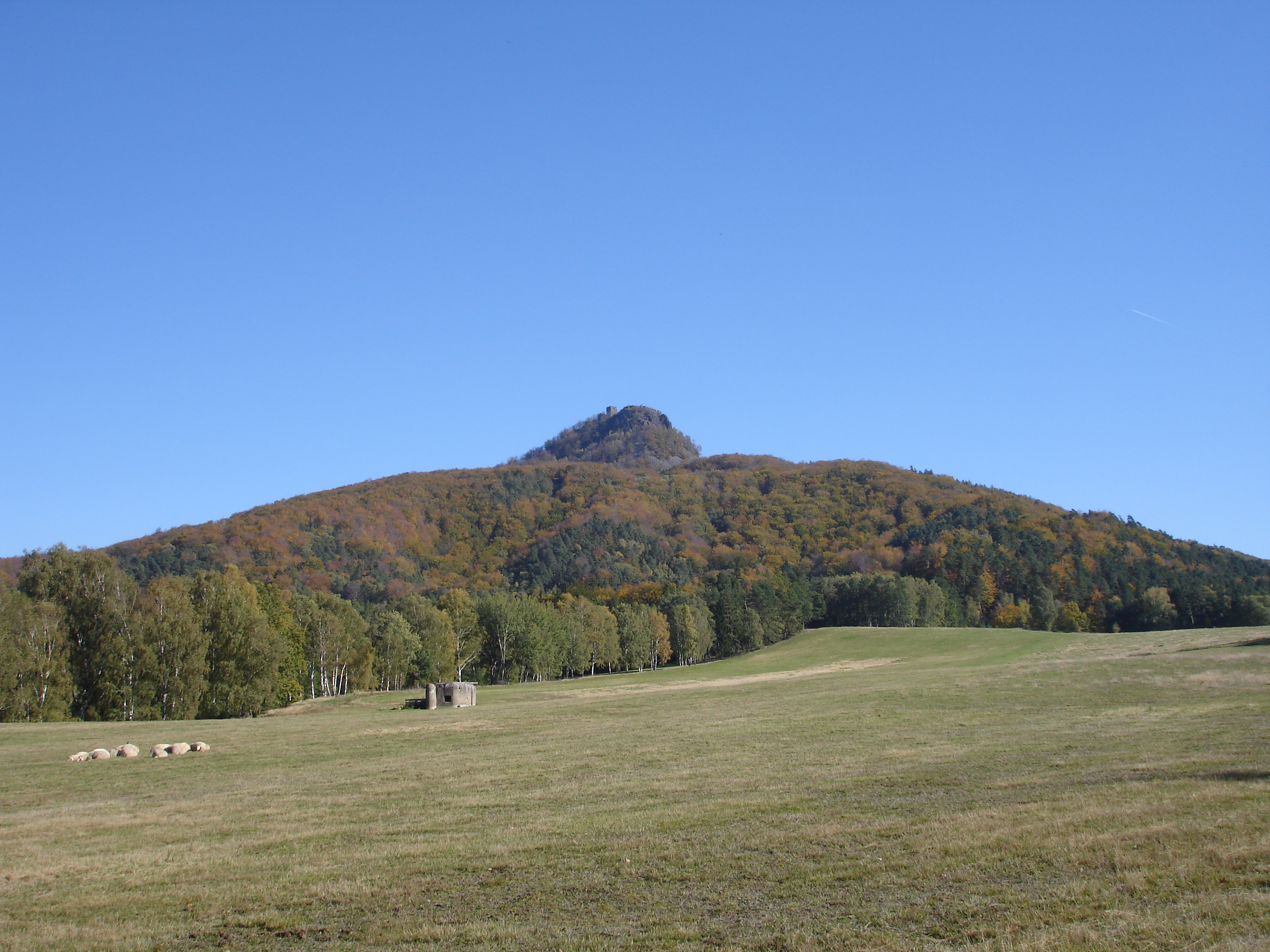
Ralsko Mountain

Ralsko (German: Rollberg or Roll) is a mountain in the Liberec Region of the Czech Republic. It is a 698-metre-high (2,290 ft) basalt isolated cone mountain. It is the highest peak of the Ralsko Uplands and of the entire Bohemian Table subprovince. The ruins of the Gothic Ralsko Castle are on its top. The summit area is protected as a nature reserve.

== Location ==
Ralsko is located in the municipal territories of Noviny pod Ralskem and Ralsko, about 16 kilometres (10 mi) east of Česká Lípa and 22 kilometres (14 mi) west of Liberec.

== History ==
The peak of the mountain formed as a volcanic upheaval during the geologic Tertiary Period.

From 1950 to 1991, the mountain part of the Ralsko military training area.

The summit area with an area of 23.7 hectares (59 acres) has been protected as a nature reserve since 1967.

== Ralsko Castle ==
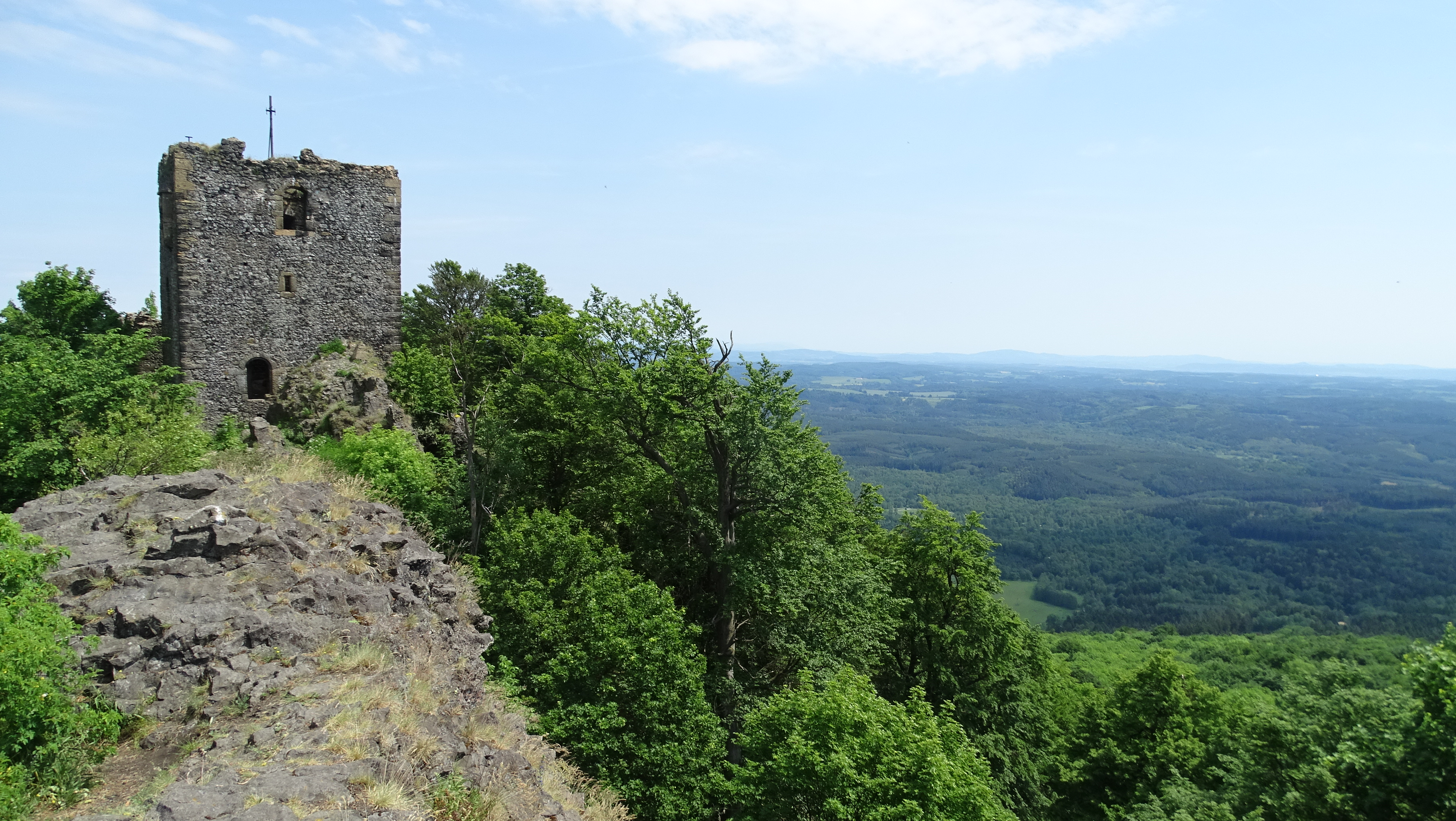
Castle ruins

The first wooden castle was probably built as early as the 13th century. The oldest preserved parts of the castle are the two residential towers, which were probably built as early as the 14th century. In the 15th century, the castle was expanded with a shield wall.

The castle was conquered in 1468 by the troops of the Bohemian Lusatian League. A ruse was used to do this, and soldiers secretly entered the castle while the cattle were returning from the pasture. In 1505 the castle is mentioned as being abandoned.
