= Bezdědice =

Bezdědice may refer to the following places in the Czech Republic:

- Bezdědice (Bělá pod Bezdězem)
- Bezdědice (Hostomice)
