= Hlínoviště =

- Village
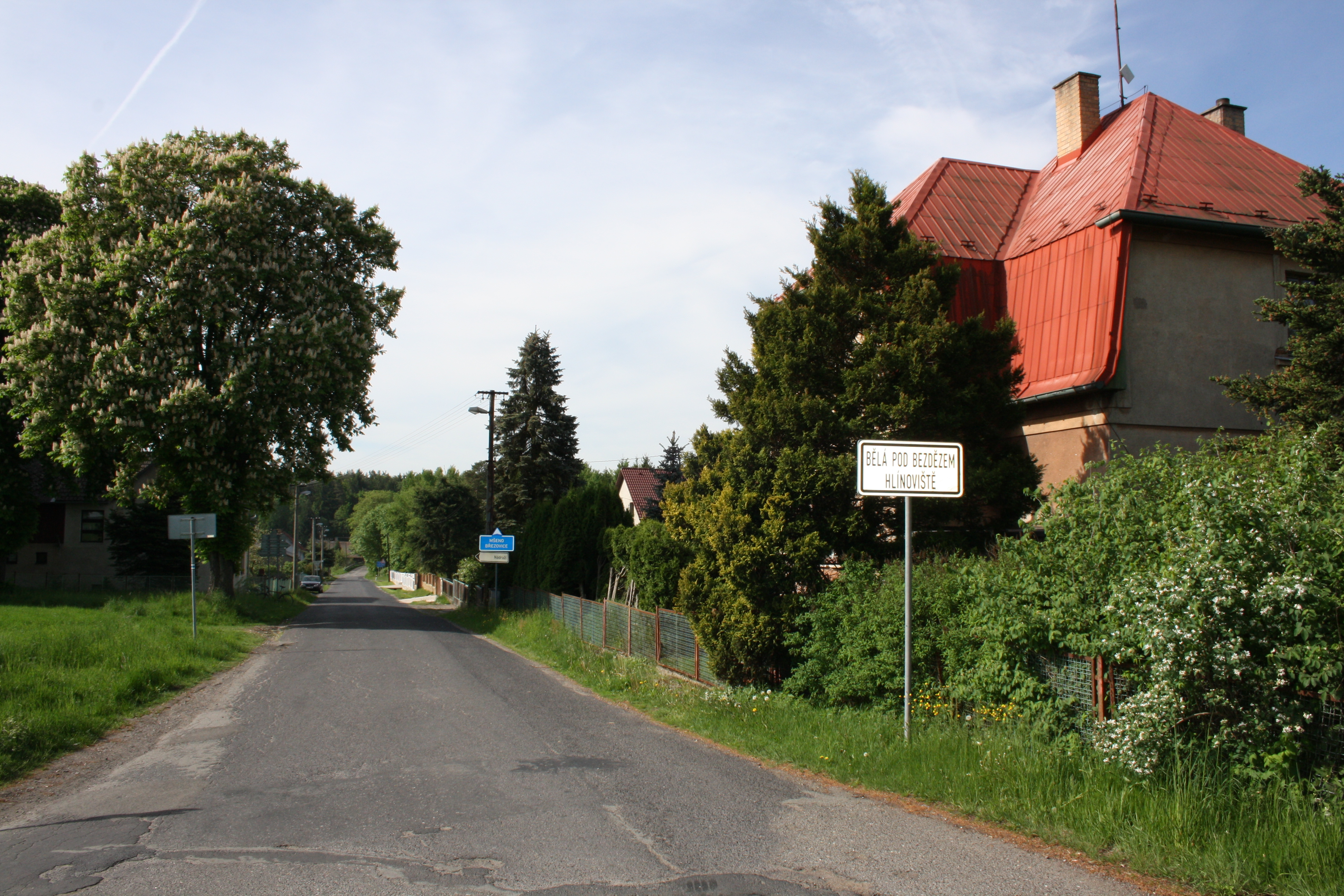
- Main road

- Location in the Czech Republic
- Coordinates: 50°30′57″N 14°44′51″E
- Country: Czech Republic
- Region: Central Bohemian
- District: Mladá Boleslav
- Municipality: Bělá pod Bezdězem
- First mentioned: 1834

Area
  - Total: 2.34 km^{2} (0.90 sq mi)
- Elevation: 330 m (1,080 ft)

Population (2021)
  - Total: 174
  - Density: 74.4/km^{2} (193/sq mi)
- Time zone: UTC+1 (CET)
  - Summer (DST): UTC+2 (CEST)
- Postal code: 294 21

Hlínoviště is a village and municipal part of Bělá pod Bezdězem in Mladá Boleslav District in the Central Bohemian Region of the Czech Republic. It has about 200 inhabitants. It is located in the western part of the town's territory.

== Demographics ==
Historical population
Year	Pop.	±%
1869	317	—
1880	312	−1.6%
1890	318	+1.9%
1900	301	−5.3%
1910	299	−0.7%
1921	280	−6.4%
1930	304	+8.6%
1950	224	−26.3%
1961	213	−4.9%
1970	210	−1.4%
1980	189	−10.0%
1991	173	−8.5%
2001	179	+3.5%
2011	174	−2.8%
2021	174	+0.0%
Source: Censuses
