= Hrdlořezy =

Hrdlořezy is name of several locations in the Czech Republic:

- Hrdlořezy (Prague)
- Hrdlořezy (Mladá Boleslav District)
