= Dolní Krupá =

Dolní Krupá may refer to places in the Czech Republic:

- Dolní Krupá (Havlíčkův Brod District), a municipality and village in the Vysočina Region,
- Dolní Krupá (Mladá Boleslav District), a municipality and village in the Central Bohemian Region
