= Nosálov =

- Municipality
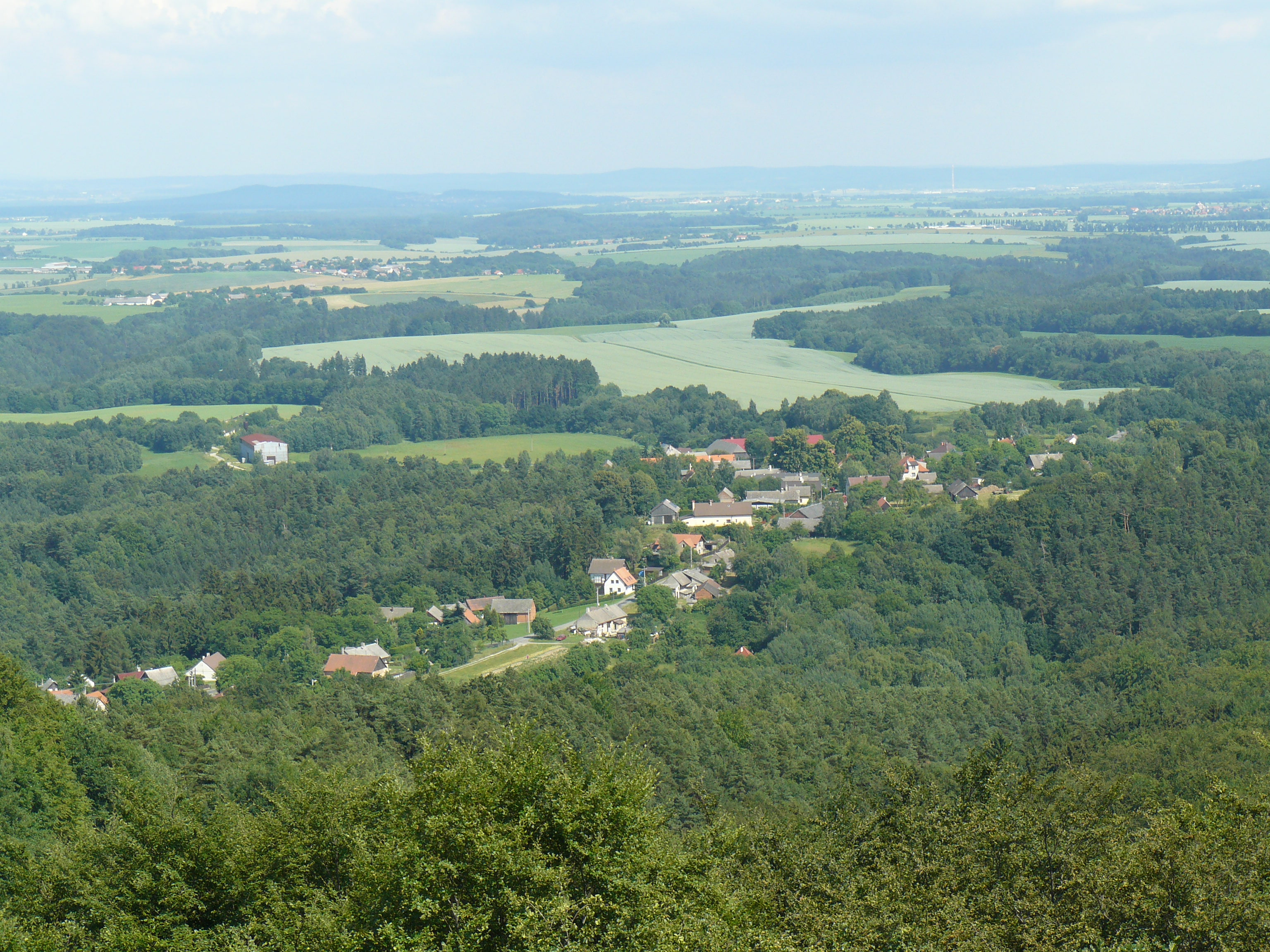
- View from the west

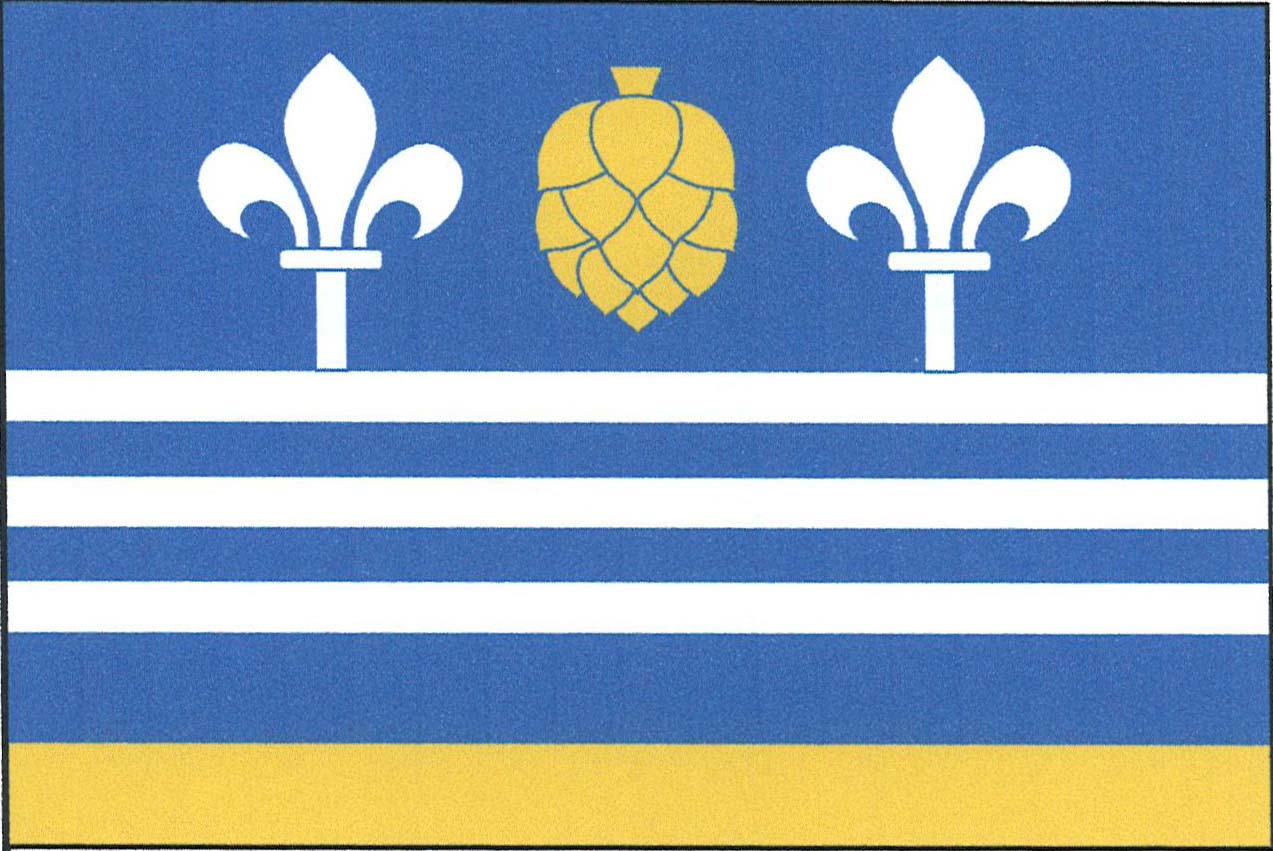
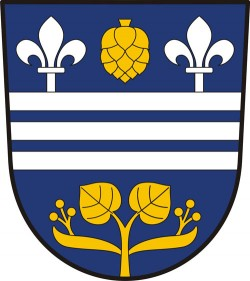
- Flag Coat of arms

- Location in the Czech Republic
- Coordinates: 50°28′25″N 14°40′15″E
- Country: Czech Republic
- Region: Central Bohemian
- District: Mělník
- First mentioned: 1324

Area
  - Total: 11.10 km^{2} (4.29 sq mi)
- Elevation: 385 m (1,263 ft)

Population (2026-01-01)
  - Total: 179
  - Density: 16.1/km^{2} (41.8/sq mi)
- Time zone: UTC+1 (CET)
  - Summer (DST): UTC+2 (CEST)
- Postal code: 277 35
- Website: www.nosalov.cz

Nosálov (German: Nosadl) is a municipality and village in Mělník District in the Central Bohemian Region of the Czech Republic. It has about 200 inhabitants. The village with well preserved examples of folk architecture is protected as a village monument reservation.

== Administrative division ==
Nosálov consists of four municipal parts (in brackets population according to the 2021 census):

- Nosálov (135)
- Brusné 1.díl (0)
- Libovice (50)
- Příbohy (12)

== Etymology ==
The name is derived from the personal name Nosál, meaning "Nosál's (court)".

== Geography ==
Nosálov is located about 19 kilometres (12 mi) northeast of Mělník and 41 km (25 mi) north of Prague. It lies on the border between the Ralsko Uplands and Jizera Table. The highest point is the hill Vrátenská hora at 507 m (1,663 ft) above sea level. The western half of the municipal territory lies in the Kokořínsko – Máchův kraj Protected Landscape Area.

== History ==
The first written mention of Nosálov is from 1324.

== Demographics ==
Historical population

Year	Pop.	±%
1869	767	—
1880	700	−8.7%
1890	629	−10.1%
1900	539	−14.3%
1910	491	−8.9%

Year	Pop.	±%
1921	526	+7.1%
1930	513	−2.5%
1950	306	−40.4%
1961	268	−12.4%
1970	265	−1.1%

Year	Pop.	±%
1980	224	−15.5%
1991	176	−21.4%
2001	152	−13.6%
2011	168	+10.5%
2021	197	+17.3%

Source: Censuses

== Transport ==
There are no railways or major roads passing through the municipality.

== Sights ==
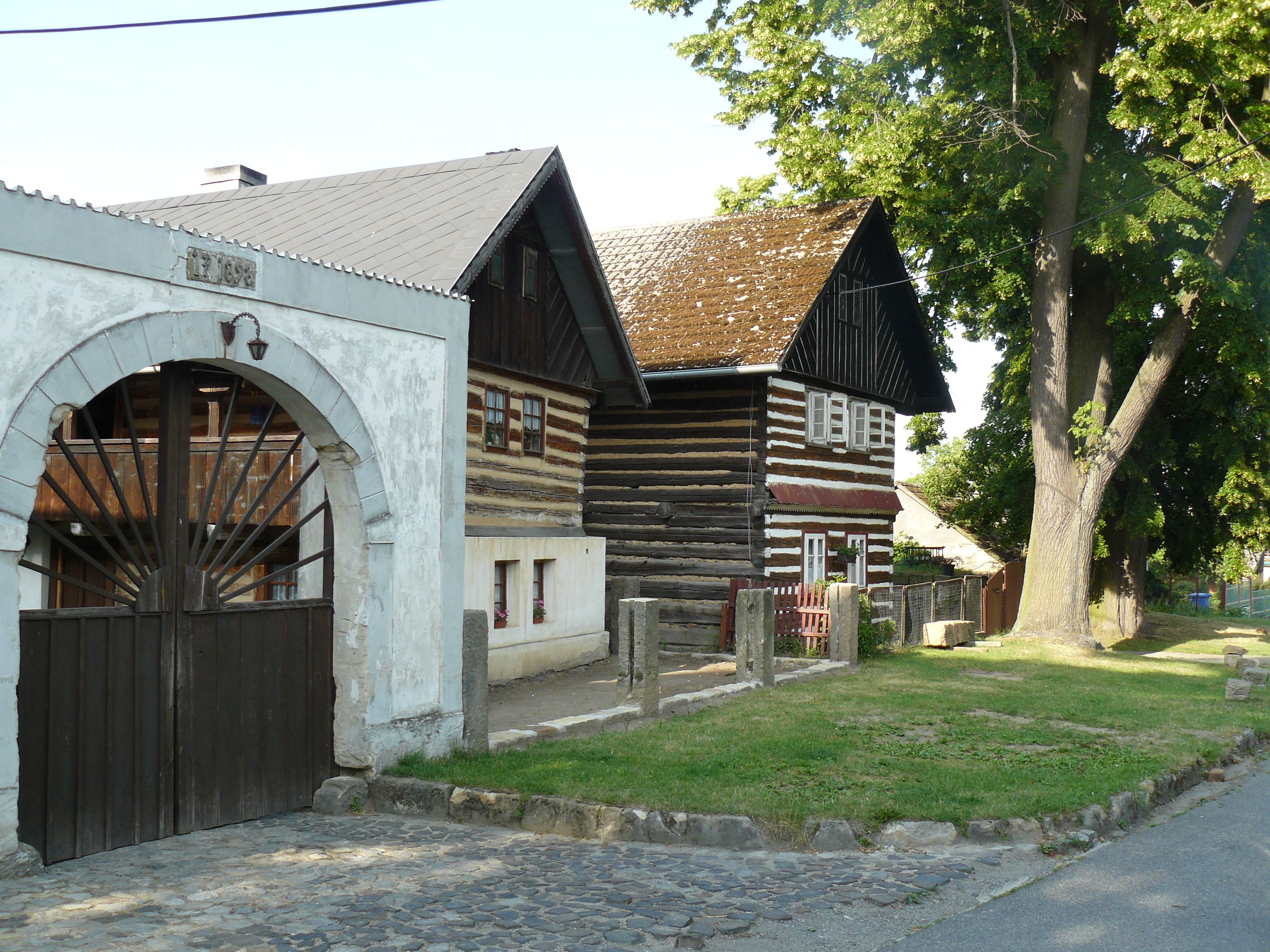
Folk architecture in the centre of Nosálov

The village of Nosálov consists of a unique complex of original wooden cottages from the turn of the 18th and 19th centuries, so called hop houses. They are a remnant of the times when there was a hop-growing area. The village is protected as a village monument reservation.

The Chapel of the Holy Trinity in the centre of Nosálov was built in 1808 and is a valuable example of a small village building of this period.
