= Zdětín =

Zdětín may refer to places in the Czech Republic:

- Zdětín (Mladá Boleslav District), a municipality and village in the Central Region
- Zdětín (Prostějov District), a municipality and village in the Olomouc Region
