= Jizera =

Jizera may refer to places in the Czech Republic:

- Jizera (river), a river
- Jizera Mountains, a mountain range
- Jizera Table, a plateau
