= Pěčice =

- Municipality
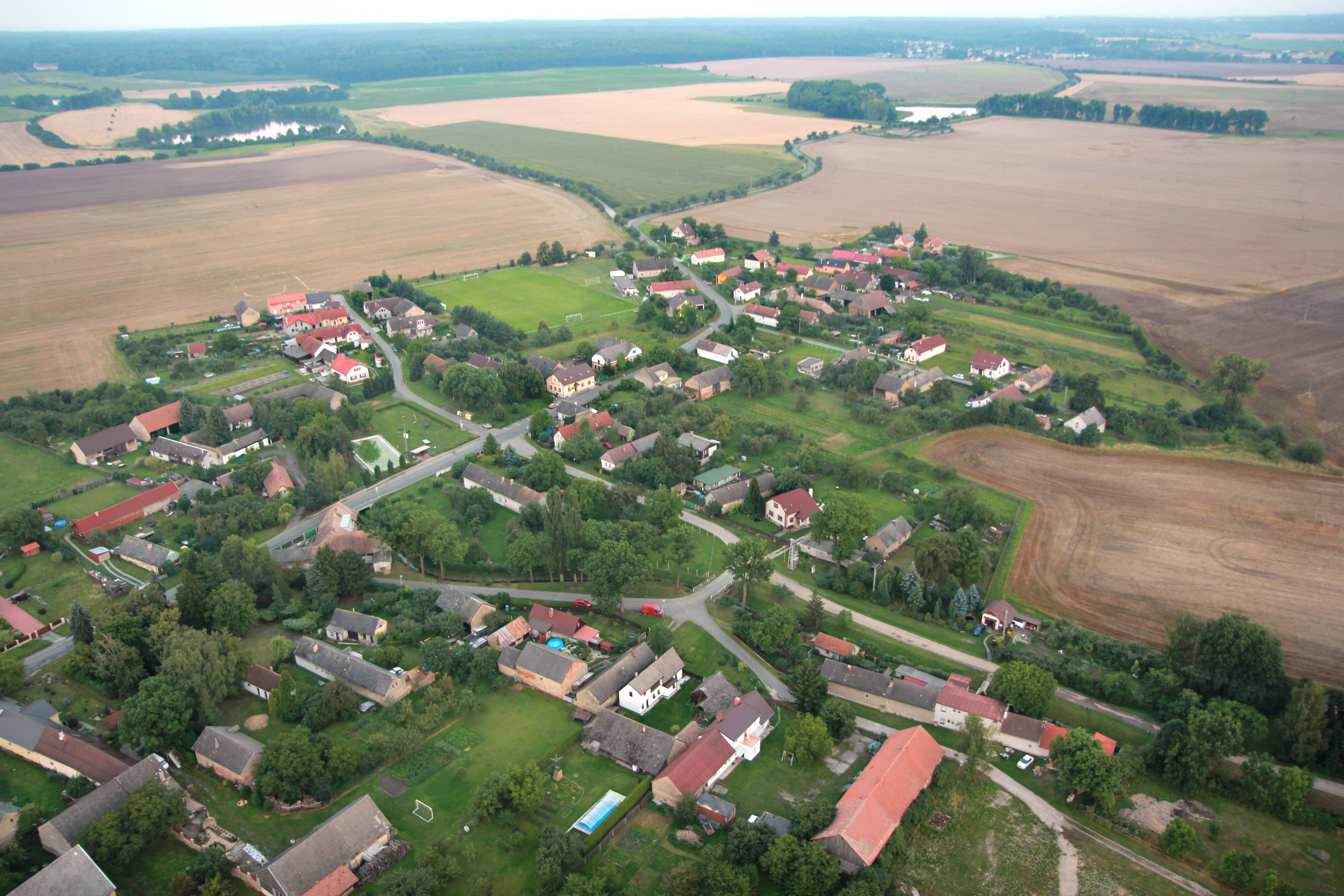
- Southern part of Pěčice

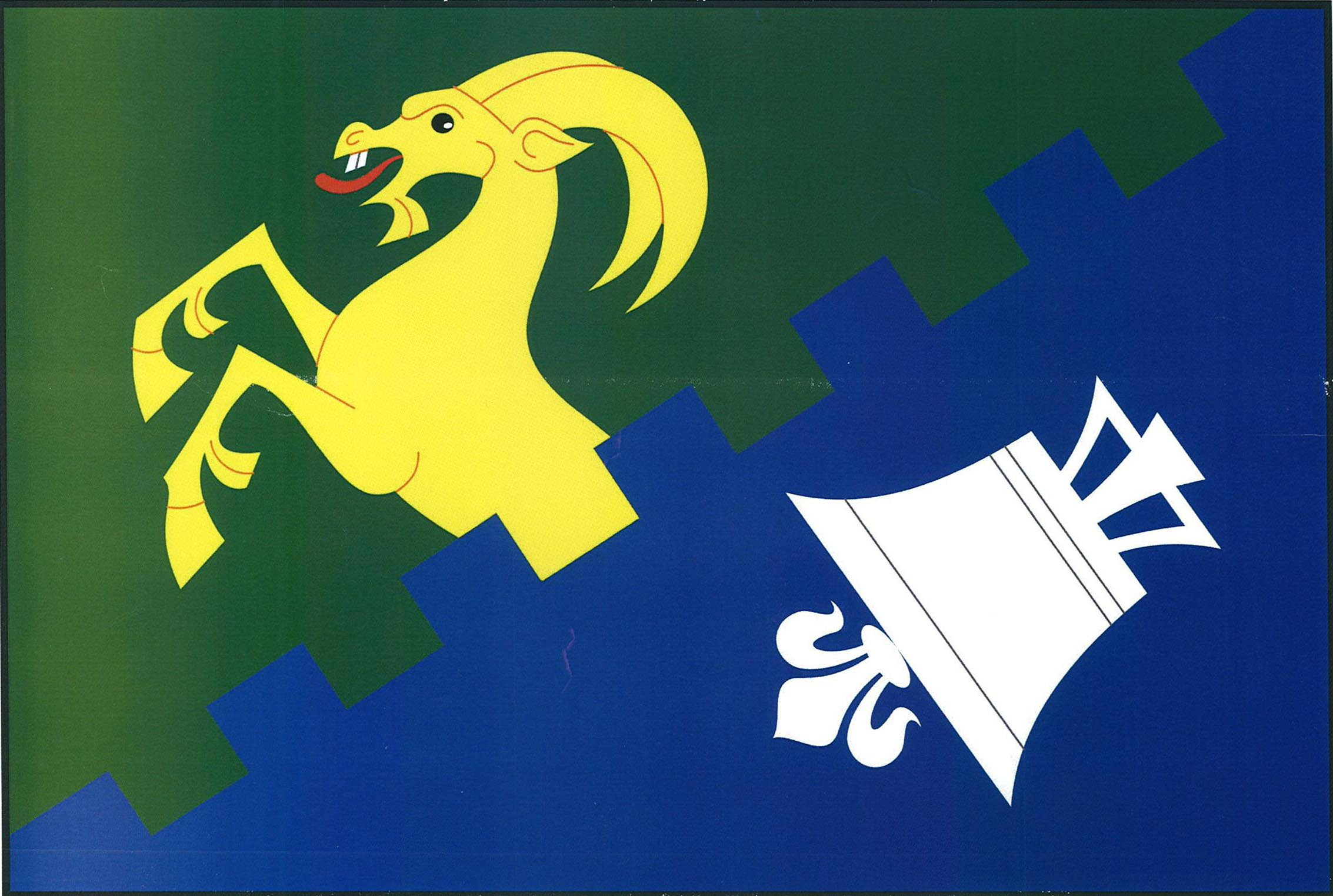
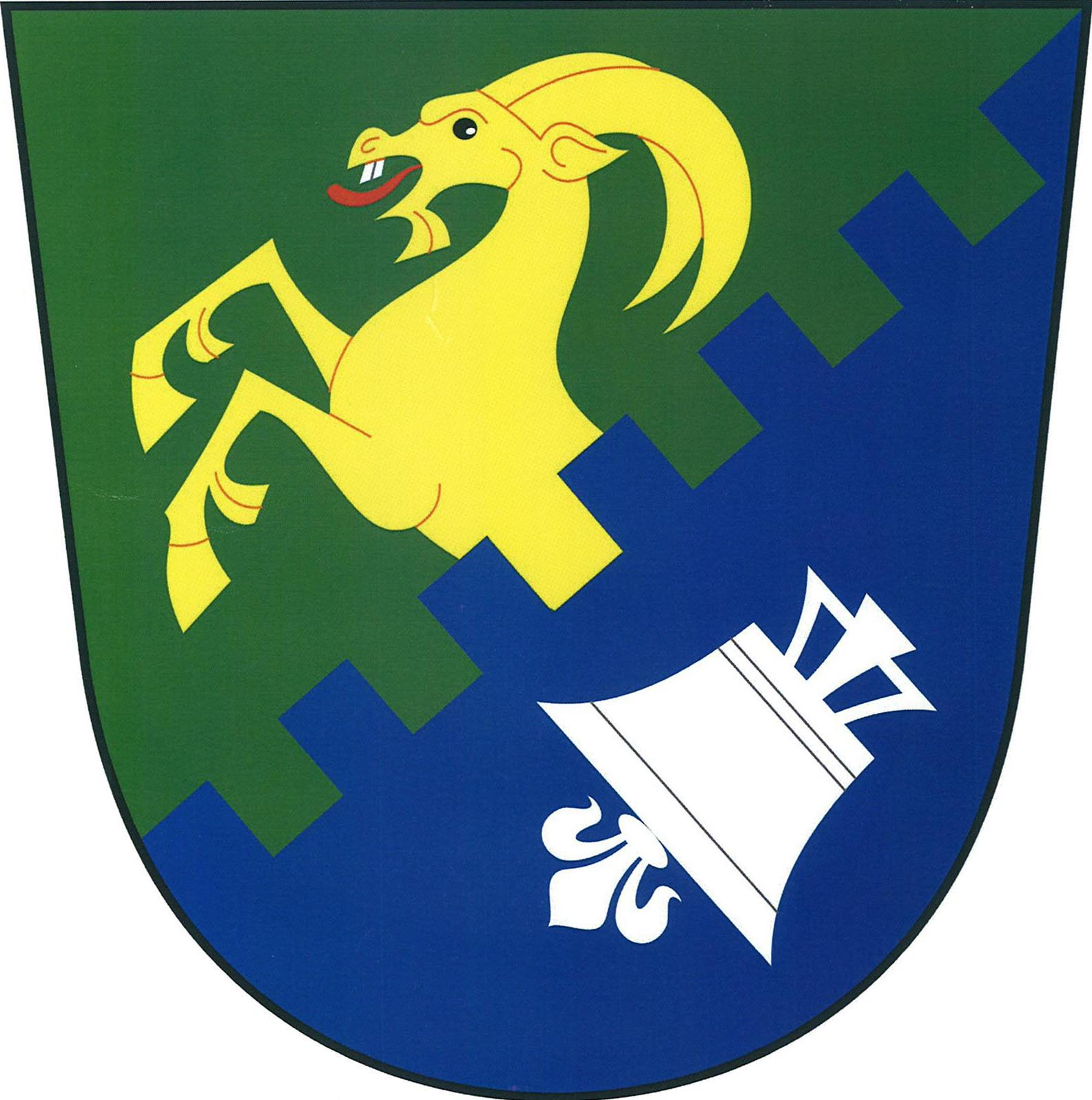
- Flag Coat of arms

- Location in the Czech Republic
- Coordinates: 50°21′4″N 15°0′15″E
- Country: Czech Republic
- Region: Central Bohemian
- District: Mladá Boleslav
- First mentioned: 1290

Area
  - Total: 8.77 km^{2} (3.39 sq mi)
- Elevation: 217 m (712 ft)

Population (2026-01-01)
  - Total: 227
  - Density: 25.9/km^{2} (67.0/sq mi)
- Time zone: UTC+1 (CET)
  - Summer (DST): UTC+2 (CEST)
- Postal code: 294 46
- Website: www.obec-pecice.cz

Pěčice is a municipality and village in Mladá Boleslav District in the Central Bohemian Region of the Czech Republic. It has about 200 inhabitants.

== Etymology ==
The name is derived from the personal name Pěka, meaning "the village of Pěka's people".

== Geography ==
Pěčice is located about 9 kilometres (6 mi) southeast of Mladá Boleslav and 43 km (27 mi) northeast of Prague. It lies in the Jizera Table. The highest point is at 261 m (856 ft) above sea level. The western part of the municipality with the Pěčice village is predominantly agricultural and the eastern part is forested. The Vlkava Stream flows through the municipality. The river and its tributary Ovčárenský potok supply a system of fishponds there.

== History ==
The first written mention of Pěčice is from 1290.

== Demographics ==
Historical population

Year	Pop.	±%
1869	384	—
1880	401	+4.4%
1890	444	+10.7%
1900	468	+5.4%
1910	425	−9.2%

Year	Pop.	±%
1921	463	+8.9%
1930	443	−4.3%
1950	334	−24.6%
1961	323	−3.3%
1970	267	−17.3%

Year	Pop.	±%
1980	209	−21.7%
1991	151	−27.8%
2001	141	−6.6%
2011	168	+19.1%
2021	202	+20.2%

Source: Censuses

== Transport ==
There are no railways or major roads passing through the municipality.

== Sights ==
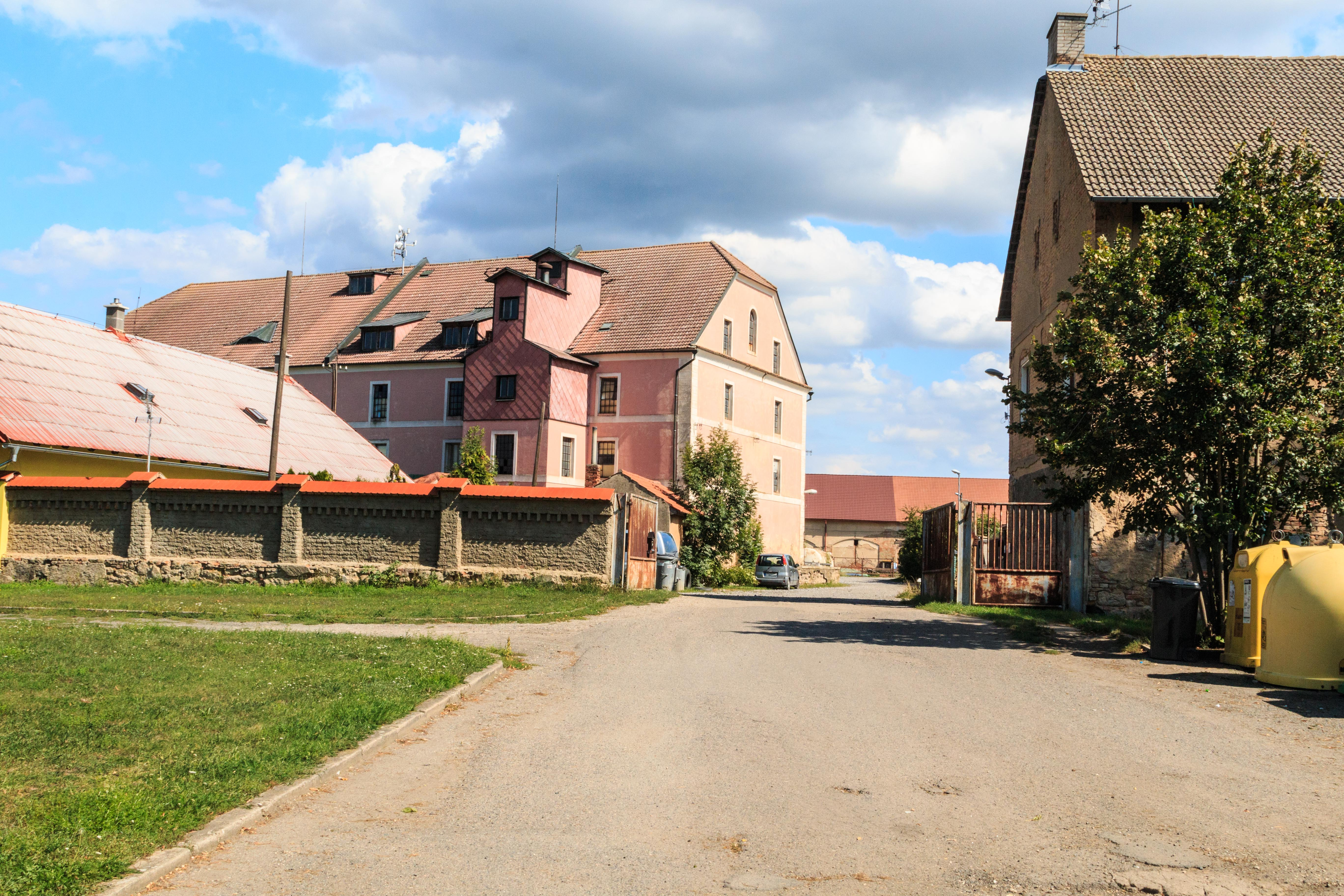
Granary

The only protected cultural monument in the municipality is a Baroque granary. Originally it was a Renaissance fortress from the second half of the 16th century, elements of which are still evident today.
