= Všejany =

- Municipality
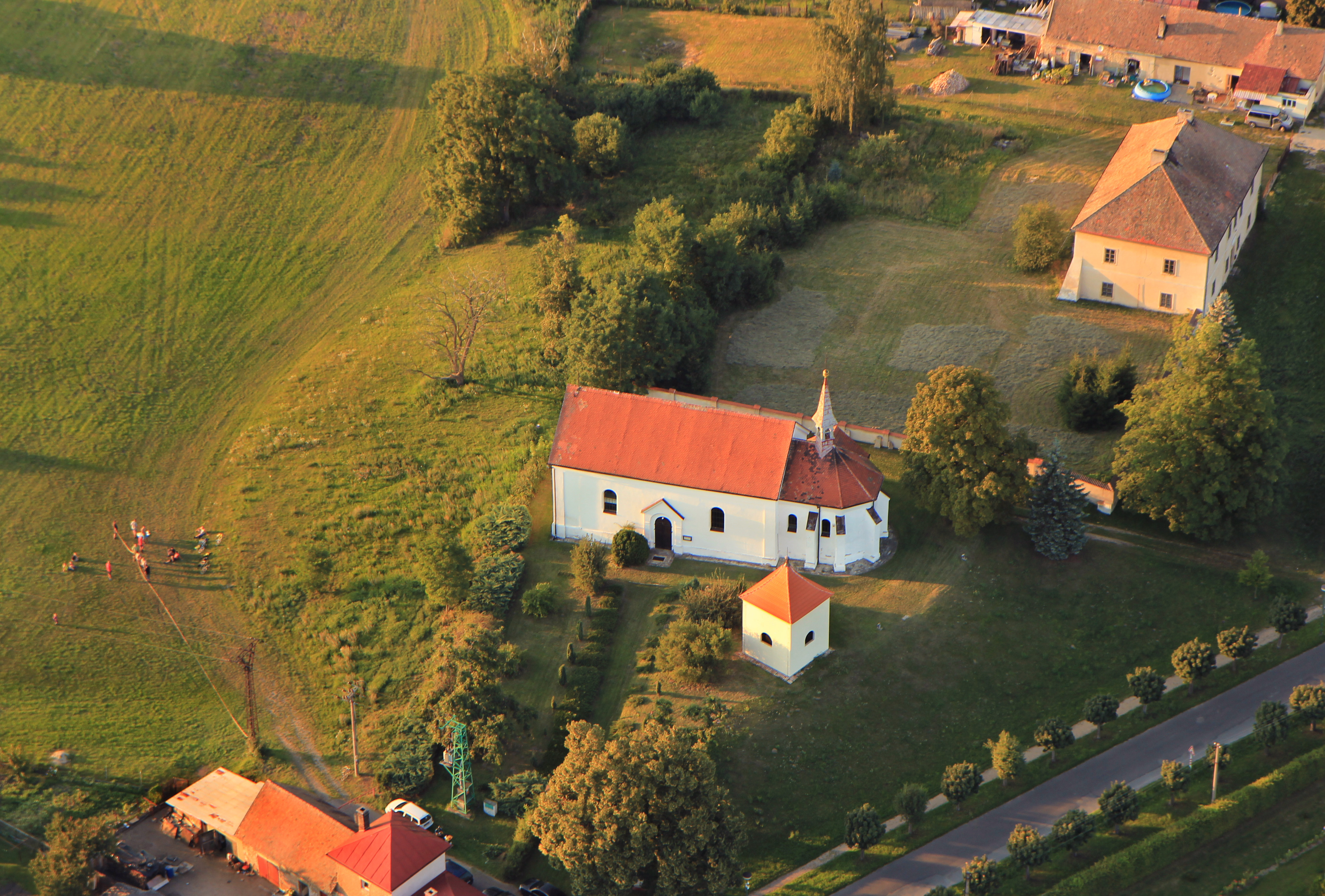
- Church of Saint John the Baptist

- Flag Coat of arms

- Location in the Czech Republic
- Coordinates: 50°15′17″N 14°57′13″E
- Country: Czech Republic
- Region: Central Bohemian
- District: Mladá Boleslav
- First mentioned: 1382

Area
  - Total: 9.39 km^{2} (3.63 sq mi)
- Elevation: 200 m (660 ft)

Population (2026-01-01)
  - Total: 725
  - Density: 77.2/km^{2} (200/sq mi)
- Time zone: UTC+1 (CET)
  - Summer (DST): UTC+2 (CEST)
- Postal code: 294 44
- Website: www.vsejany.cz

Všejany is a municipality and village in Mladá Boleslav District in the Central Bohemian Region of the Czech Republic. It has about 700 inhabitants.

== Administrative division ==
Všejany consists of two municipal parts (in brackets population according to the 2021 census):

- Všejany (347)
- Vanovice (327)

== Etymology ==
From the oldest documents to those from the 19th century, the name of the village fluctuated between the forms Všejany and Všejamy, and it is not clear which name was the original and which was the distortion. The first part Vše- means 'all' in Czech, but in local names it means 'full of'. If the village was named Všejany, it was probably derived from the given name Jan and people with this name predominated in the village. If the original form was Všejamy, it was probably derived from the word jáma ('pit') and the village was located in an area full of pits.

== Geography ==
Všejany is located about 18 kilometres (11 mi) south of Mladá Boleslav and 33 km (21 mi) northeast of Prague. It lies on the border between the Central Elbe Table and Jizera Table. The highest point is at 255 m (837 ft) above sea level. The Vlkava River flows through the municipality.

== History ==
The first written mention of Všejany is from 1382.

== Demographics ==
Historical population

Year	Pop.	±%
1869	567	—
1880	732	+29.1%
1890	797	+8.9%
1900	746	−6.4%
1910	840	+12.6%

Year	Pop.	±%
1921	931	+10.8%
1930	986	+5.9%
1950	865	−12.3%
1961	865	+0.0%
1970	755	−12.7%

Year	Pop.	±%
1980	679	−10.1%
1991	577	−15.0%
2001	569	−1.4%
2011	641	+12.7%
2021	674	+5.1%

Source: Censuses

== Transport ==
Všejany is located on the railway line Mladá Boleslav–Nymburk.

== Sights ==
The main landmark of Všejany is the Church of Saint John the Baptist. It was originally a Gothic church, rebuilt in the Baroque style.
