= Jivina (Mladá Boleslav District) =

- Municipality
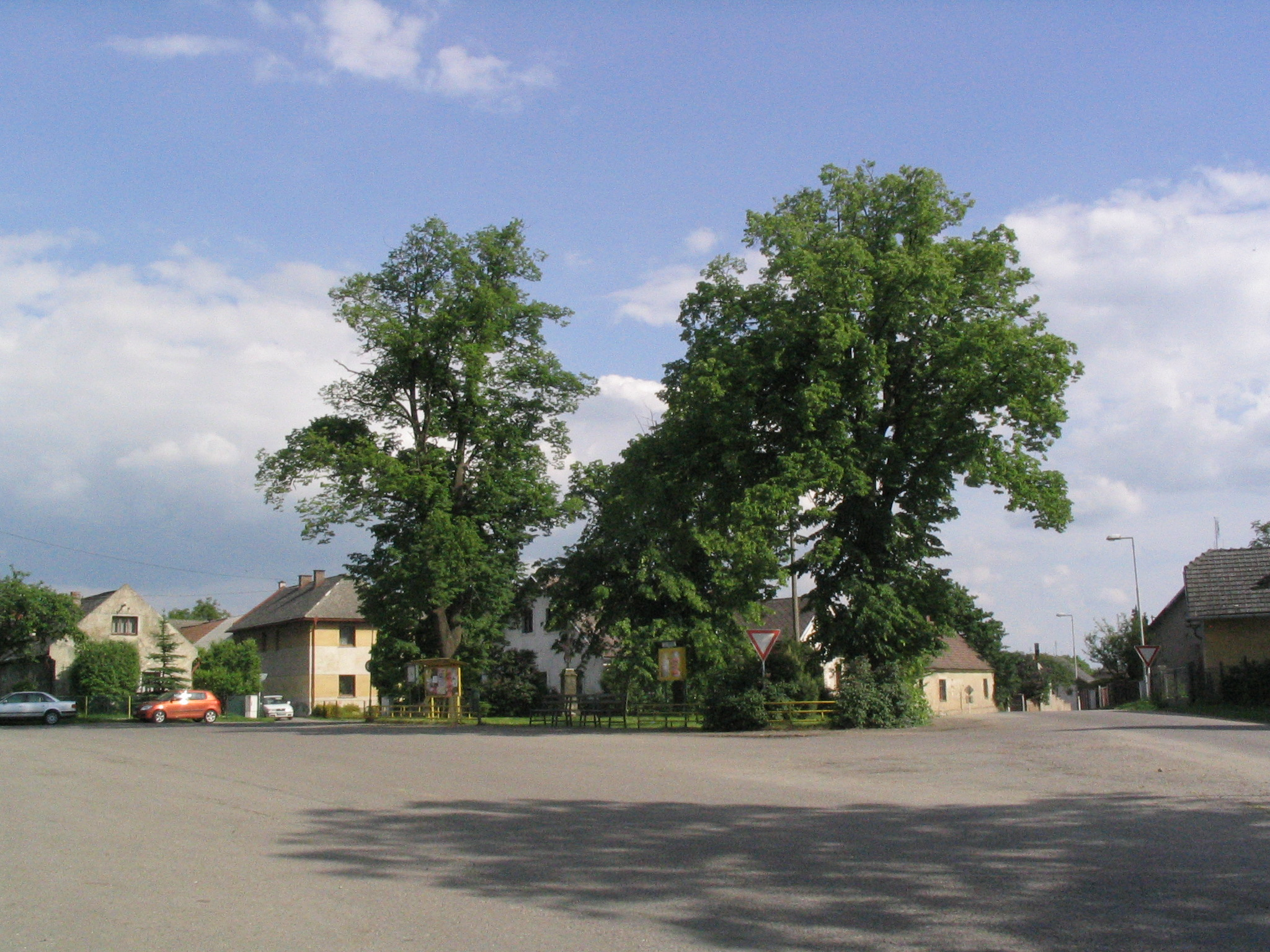
- Centre of Jivina

- Location in the Czech Republic
- Coordinates: 50°33′15″N 14°56′50″E
- Country: Czech Republic
- Region: Central Bohemian
- District: Mladá Boleslav
- First mentioned: 1400

Area
  - Total: 5.07 km^{2} (1.96 sq mi)
- Elevation: 309 m (1,014 ft)

Population (2026-01-01)
  - Total: 500
  - Density: 99/km^{2} (260/sq mi)
- Time zone: UTC+1 (CET)
  - Summer (DST): UTC+2 (CEST)
- Postal code: 294 14
- Website: www.jivina.cz

Jivina is a municipality and village in Mladá Boleslav District in the Central Bohemian Region of the Czech Republic. It has about 500 inhabitants.

== Etymology ==
The name is derived from the word jíva (i.e. 'goat willow'), meaning "goat willow grove".

== Geography ==
Jivina is located about 14 kilometres (9 mi) north of Mladá Boleslav and 58 km (36 mi) northeast of Prague. It lies in the Jizera Table. The highest point is at 326 m (1,070 ft) above sea level. The Jizera River flows along the eastern municipal border and the Zábrdka Stream flows along the western municipal border.

== History ==
The first written mention of Jivina is from 1400.

== Demographics ==
Historical population

Year	Pop.	±%
1869	312	—
1880	340	+9.0%
1890	340	+0.0%
1900	368	+8.2%
1910	361	−1.9%

Year	Pop.	±%
1921	434	+20.2%
1930	434	+0.0%
1950	318	−26.7%
1961	334	+5.0%
1970	326	−2.4%

Year	Pop.	±%
1980	313	−4.0%
1991	363	+16.0%
2001	401	+10.5%
2011	441	+10.0%
2021	480	+8.8%

Source: Censuses

== Transport ==
There are no railways or major roads passing through the municipality.

== Sights ==
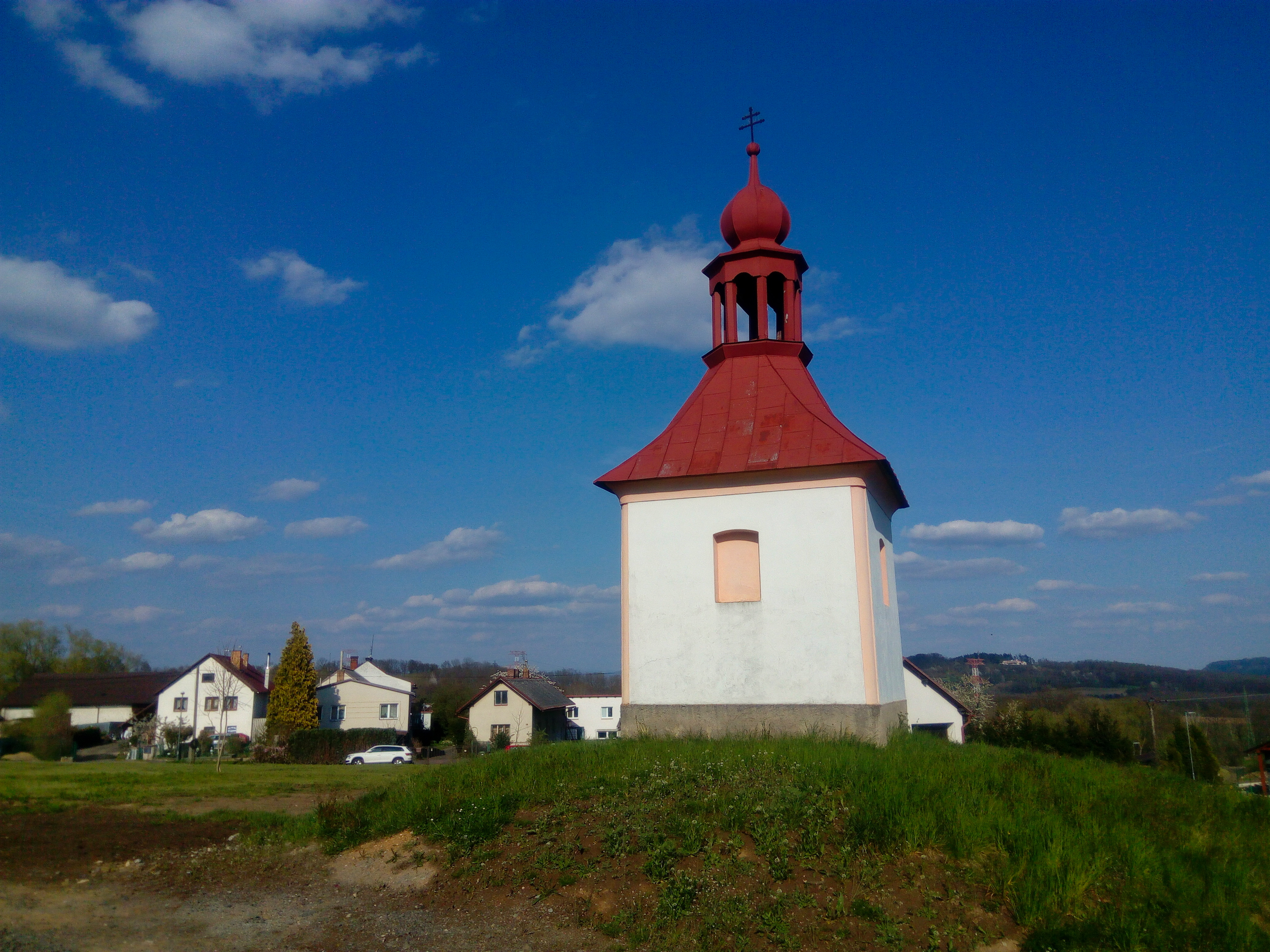
Chapel in Jivina

There are no protected cultural monuments in the municipality. Among the landmarks of Jivina are the two chapels.
