= Bezděz =

- Municipality
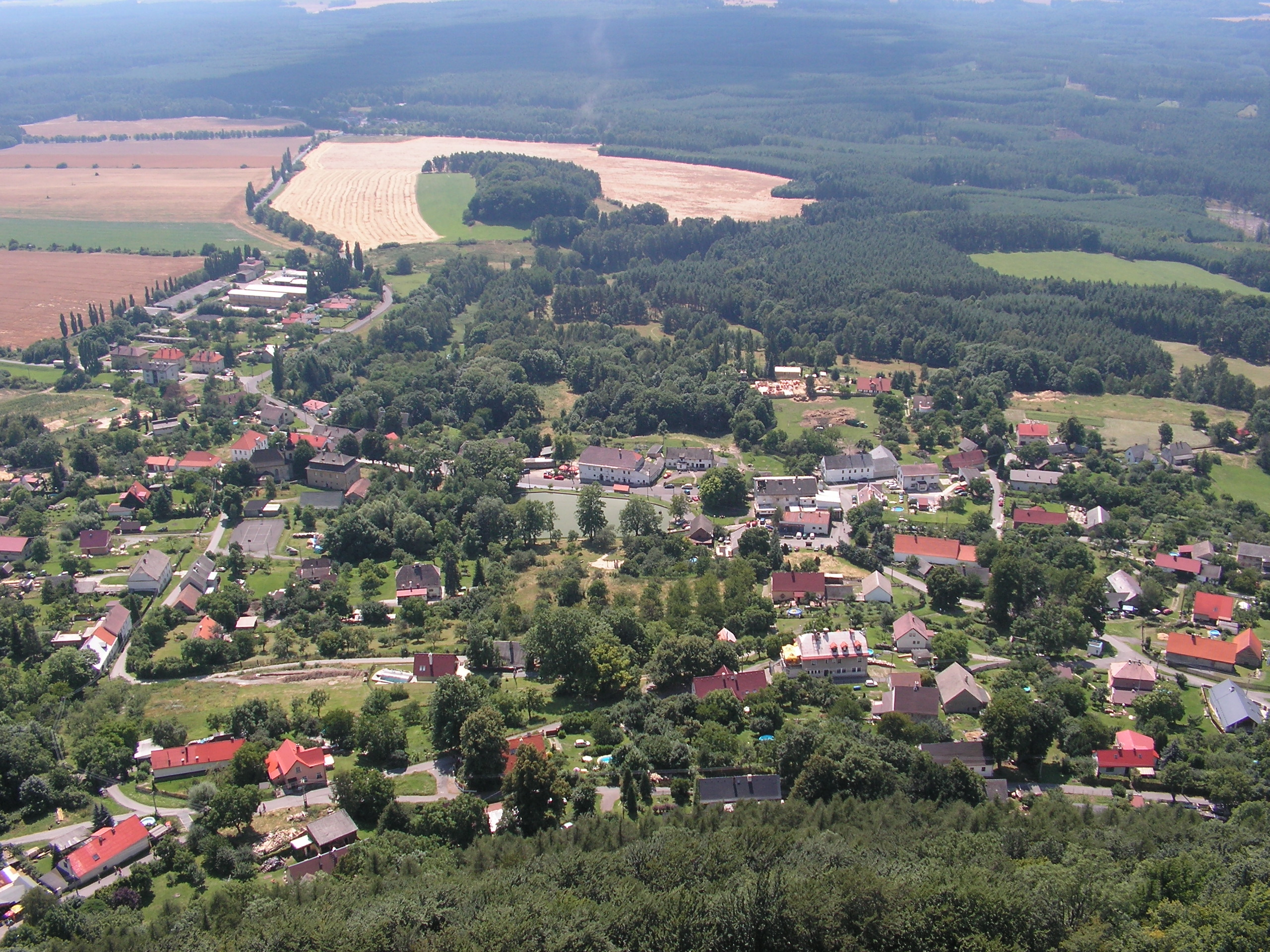
- Bezděz seen from Bezděz hill

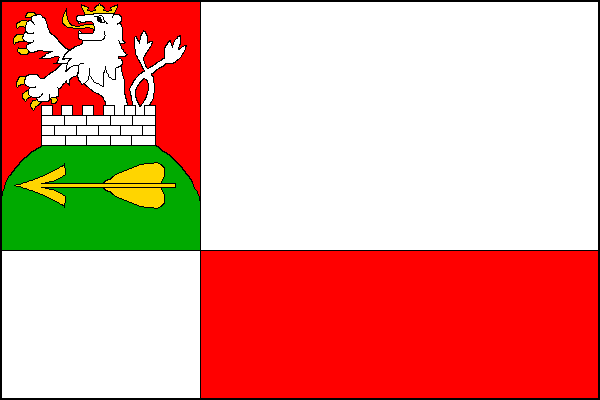
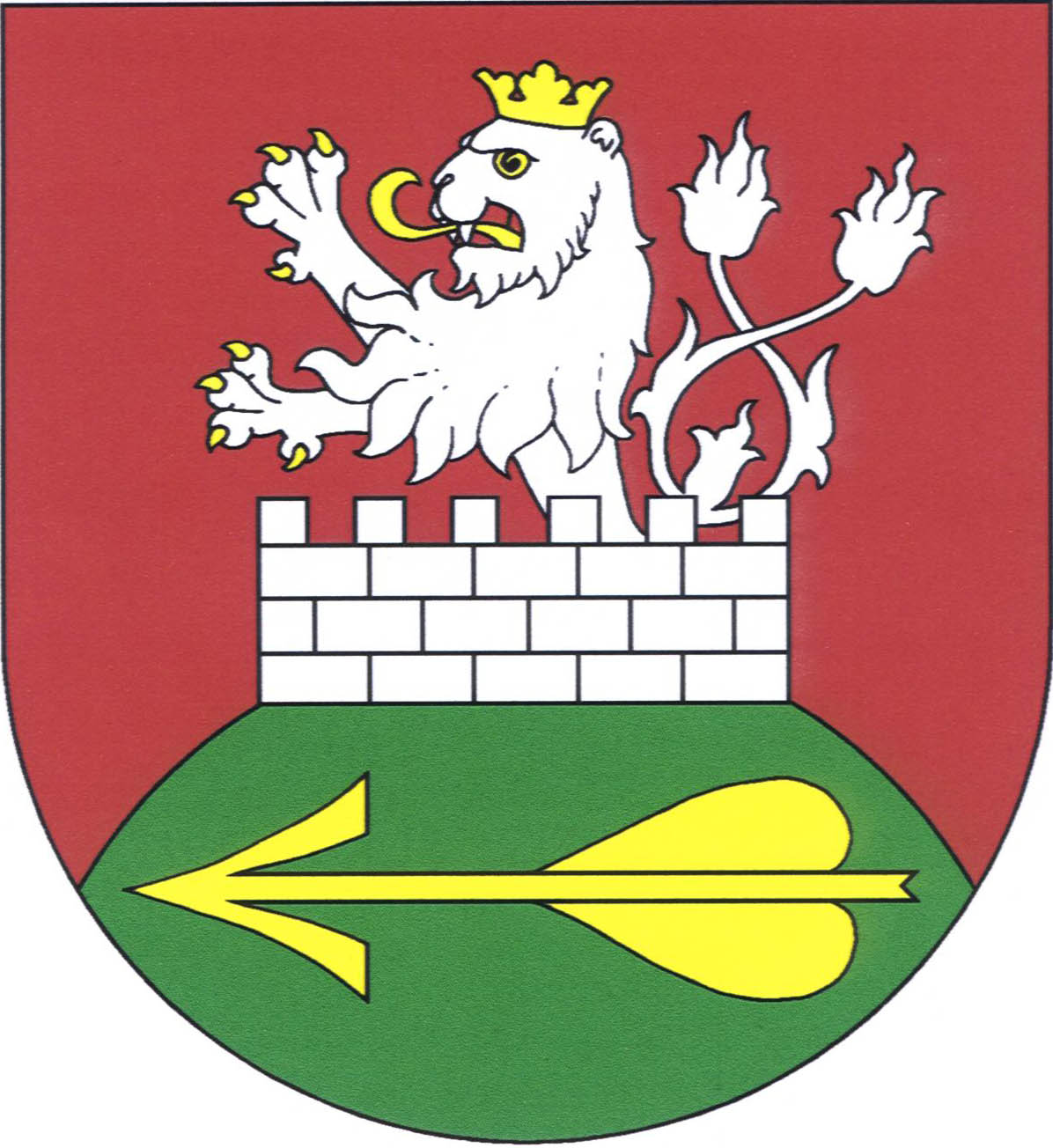
- Flag Coat of arms

- Location in the Czech Republic
- Coordinates: 50°32′1″N 14°43′19″E
- Country: Czech Republic
- Region: Liberec
- District: Česká Lípa
- First mentioned: 1264

Area
  - Total: 23.83 km^{2} (9.20 sq mi)
- Elevation: 362 m (1,188 ft)

Population (2026-01-01)
  - Total: 355
  - Density: 14.9/km^{2} (38.6/sq mi)
- Time zone: UTC+1 (CET)
  - Summer (DST): UTC+2 (CEST)
- Postal code: 472 01
- Website: bezdez.cz

Bezděz (German: Schloßbösig) is a municipality and village in Česká Lípa District in the Liberec Region of the Czech Republic. It has about 400 inhabitants. It is known for the ruin of the medieval Bezděz Castle, protected as a national cultural monument.

== Etymology ==
The name Bezděz is derived from the personal name Bezděd (Besdeth), meaning "Bezděd's (property)".

== Geography ==
Bezděz is located about 21 kilometres (13 mi) southeast of Česká Lípa and 33 km (21 mi) southwest of Liberec. It lies mostly in the Ralsko Uplands, only the southeastern part of the municipal territory extends into the Jizera Table. The highest point is the hill Bezděz at 606 m (1,988 ft) above sea level. Most of the territory lies within the Kokořínsko – Máchův kraj Protected Landscape Area.

== History ==
The first written mention of Bezděz is from 1264. In 1291 or 1293, the village was promoted to a town, but it lost its town privileges after Bělá pod Bezdězem was founded in 1304. In 1898, the village was severely damaged by fire.

== Demographics ==
Historical population

Year	Pop.	±%
1869	680	—
1880	638	−6.2%
1890	588	−7.8%
1900	499	−15.1%
1910	499	+0.0%

Year	Pop.	±%
1921	539	+8.0%
1930	547	+1.5%
1950	339	−38.0%
1961	327	−3.5%
1970	349	+6.7%

Year	Pop.	±%
1980	295	−15.5%
1991	279	−5.4%
2001	268	−3.9%
2011	299	+11.6%
2021	358	+19.7%

Source: Censuses

== Economy ==
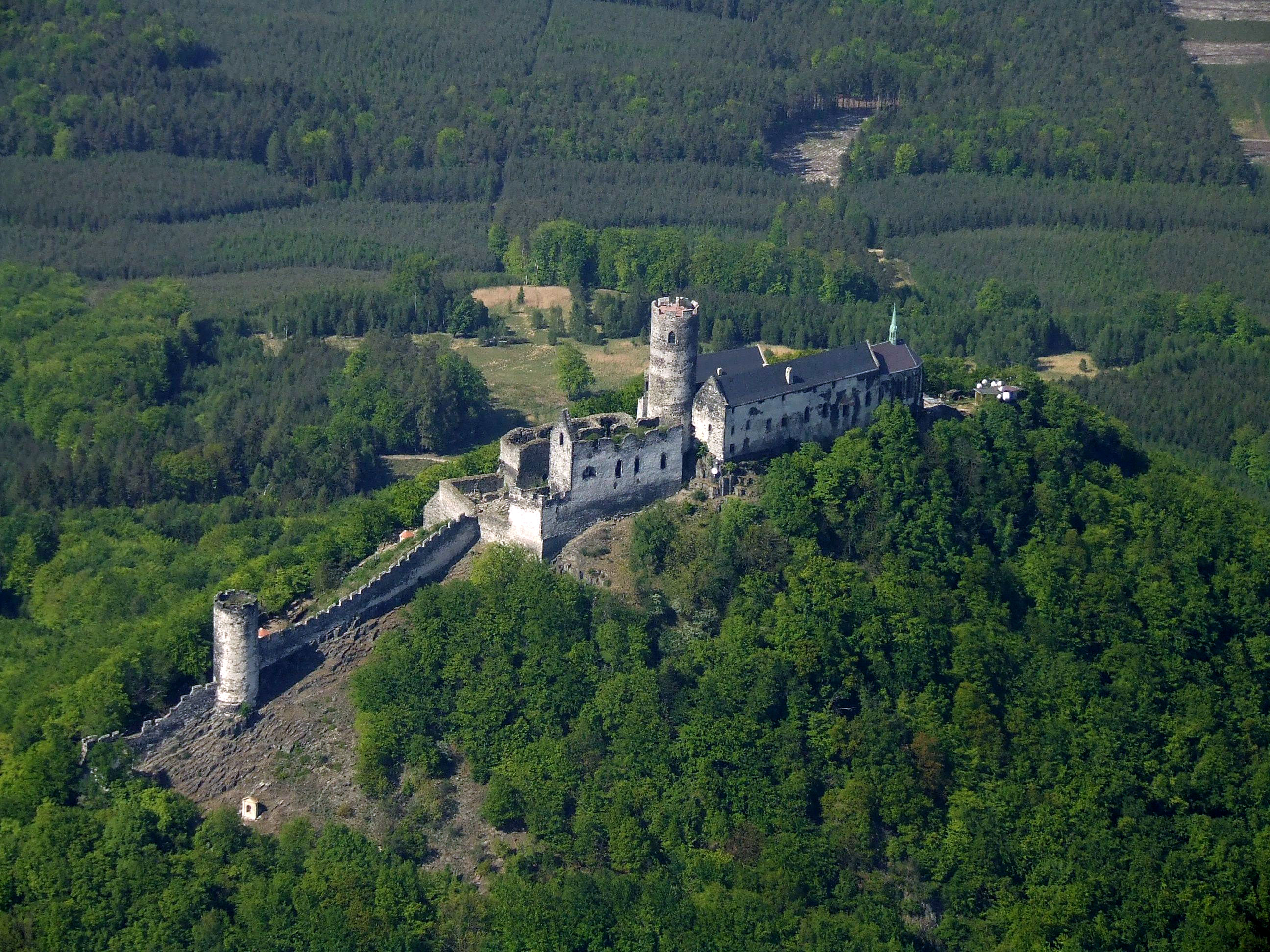
Bezděz Castle on Bezděz hill

There are almost no job opportunities in the municipality. Most residents commute to work in nearby towns.

== Transport ==
The I/38 road (the section which connects Mladá Boleslav with Česká Lípa) runs through the municipality.

The railway line Kolín–Rumburk briefly crosses the municipal territory. The train station Bezděz is located just outside the municipality.

== Sights ==
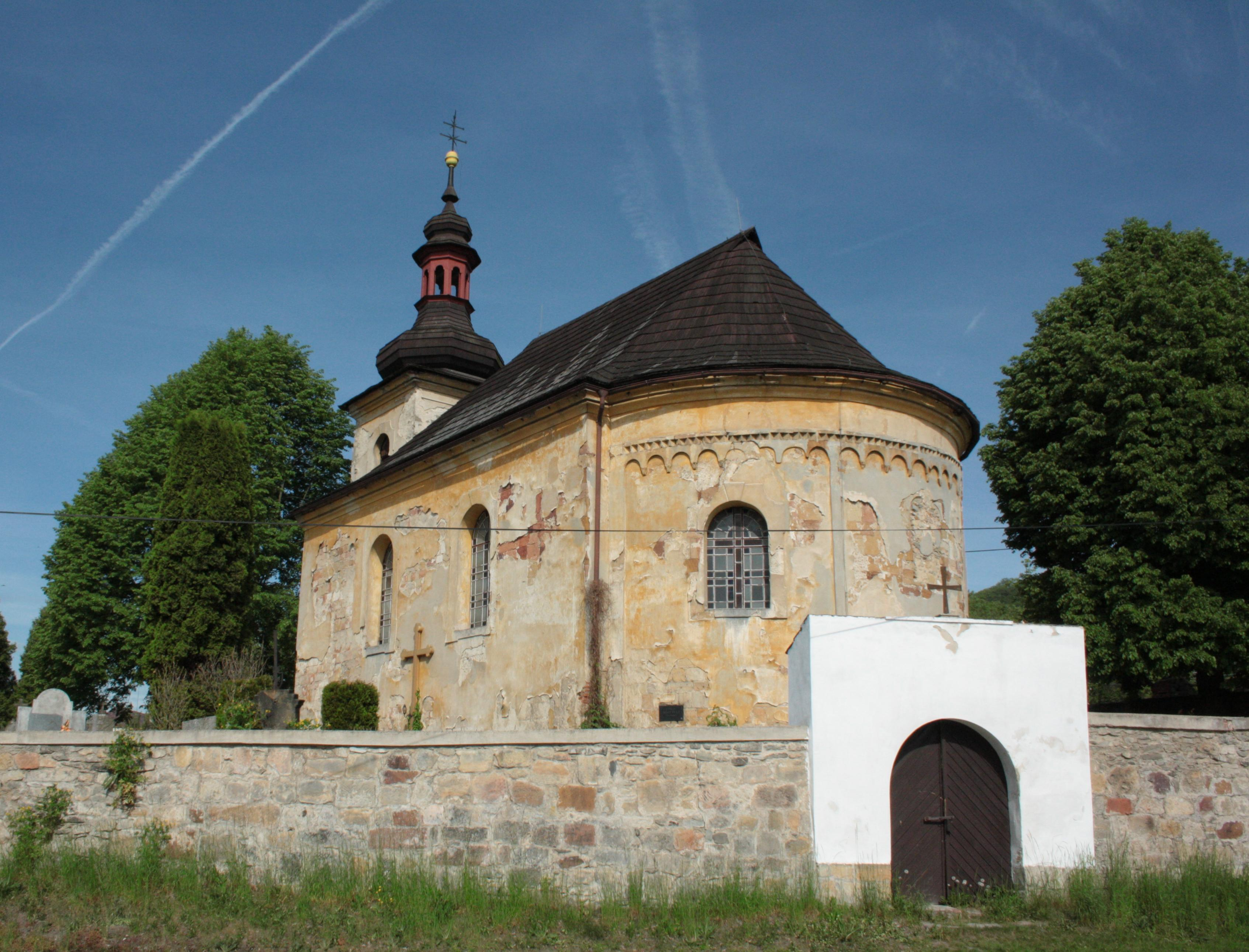
Church of Saint Giles

Bezděz is known for the Bezděz Castle. The well-preserved ruin of the Gothic castle is one of the most important monuments of the whole region, protected as a national cultural monument.

The Church of Saint Giles dates from the end of the 13th century at the latest and has a Romanesque core. It was rebuilt in the Baroque style in 1764–1769, when the tower was added. The interior is equipped with valuable late Baroque and Rococo furniture.
