= Bezděz Castle =

Bezděz
- Hrad Bezděz
- Bezděz, Liberec Region; Near Česká Lípa in the Czech Republic
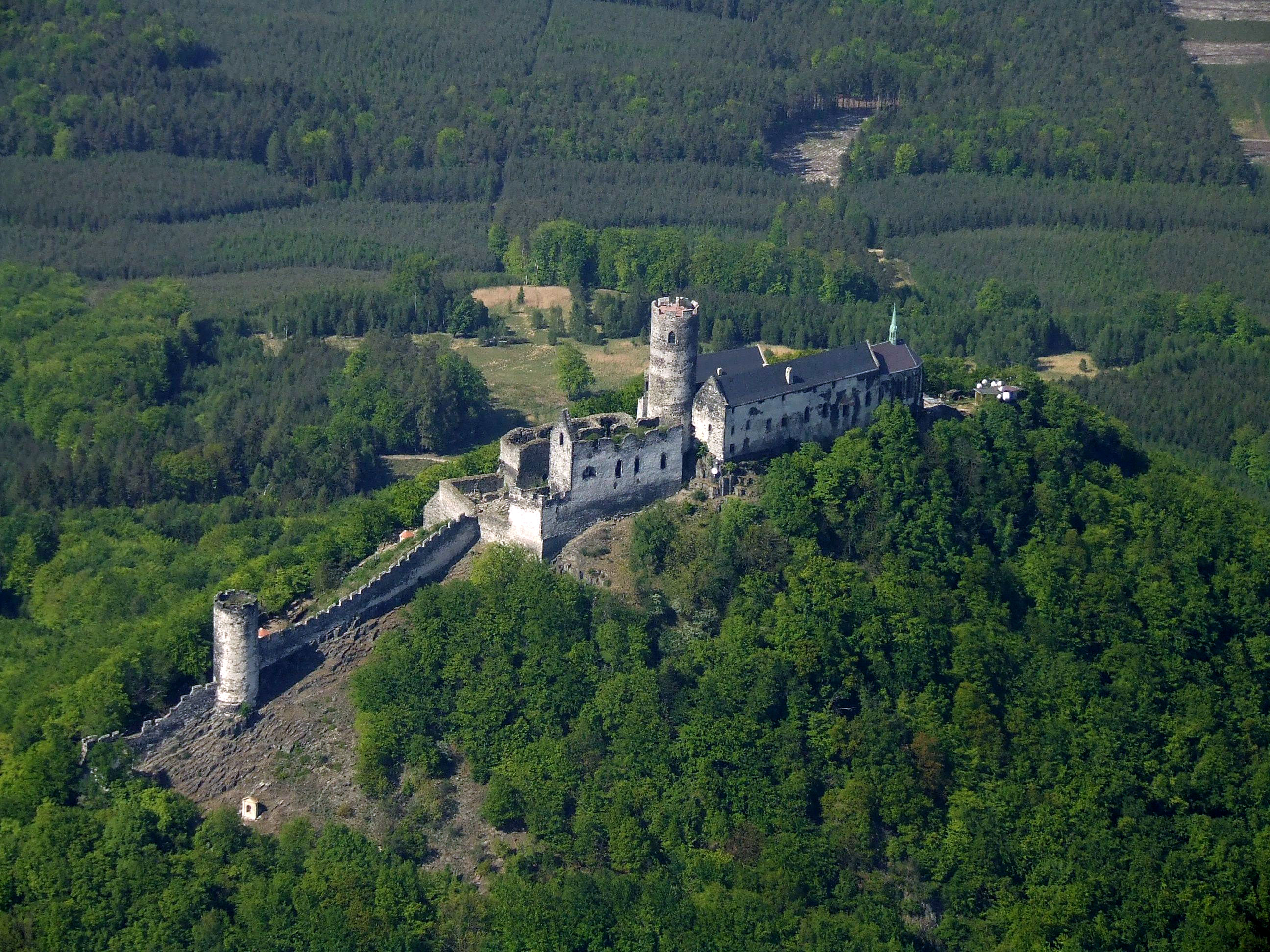
- Bezděz Castle from above

Site information
- Type: Castle

Location
- Location in the Czech Republic
- Coordinates: 50°32′21″N 14°43′13″E

Site history
- Built: 1264

Bezděz Castle (Czech: hrad Bezděz) is a Gothic castle in the Liberec Region of the Czech Republic. It is located about 20 kilometres (12 mi) southeast of Česká Lípa. Its construction began before 1264 by order of King Ottokar II of Bohemia.

The royal castle of Bezděz was one of the most important Gothic castles in the Czech lands until its destruction in the Thirty Years' War. Erected between 1260 and 1280 on the phonolite hill of Velký Bezděz, 604 metres (1,982 ft) above sea level, it became the characteristic landmark of the local landscape and met the demands for an inaccessible as well as respectable royal castle.

== History ==
A year after Ottokar II's death, the castle Bezděz, which was still unfinished, became the place of imprisonment of Queen Kunhuta and her underage son Wenceslaus II, kept under lock and key in very spartan conditions by Wenceslaus's guardian Otto of Brandenburg, Margrave of Brandenburg, after the Battle on the Marchfeld. The boy, only 6 or 7 at the time, remained there alone when his mother escaped under a pretext and it is widely accepted that the place left its mark on him. As an adult, and ruling monarch, he returned to Bezděz to order the construction of a chapel, one of the best preserved areas of the castle today.

The castle complex was completed during the reign of Wenceslaus II, who used the local forests very frequently for hunting and relaxation. It served for this purpose until the Thirty Years' War when, as part of the round of confiscations after the Battle of the White Mountain, it fell into the hands of Albrecht of Wallenstein. The famous general started turning the castle into a fortress in 1623, but then halted the construction work. In 1627 he decided that it should be rebuilt into a monastery for the Benedictines from Montserrat, who later brought a copy of the Virgin of Montserrat (the Black Madonna) in 1666, making the castle a pilgrimage site for years to come.

In 1686 Stations of the Cross were built along the path to the castle and the whole complex served for religious purposes until 1785, when the monastery was dissolved on the orders of Joseph II. Pilgrimages were banned and the castle became forlorn, slowly becoming dilapidated. The Romantic Movement's passion for medieval monuments helped preserve the castle, which is a sole preserved example of an unaltered castle of the 13th century.

Parts that are accessible to visitors are the castle precincts including the royal palace, burgrave's house and the unique early Gothic chapel. The castle tower serves as an observation tower. The castle's romantic silhouette gave rise to many legends and inspired a great number of writers, artists and composers, the most famous of whom included the poet Karel Hynek Mácha and the composer Bedřich Smetana.

== See also ==
- Frýdlant
