= Zdětín (Mladá Boleslav District) =

- Municipality
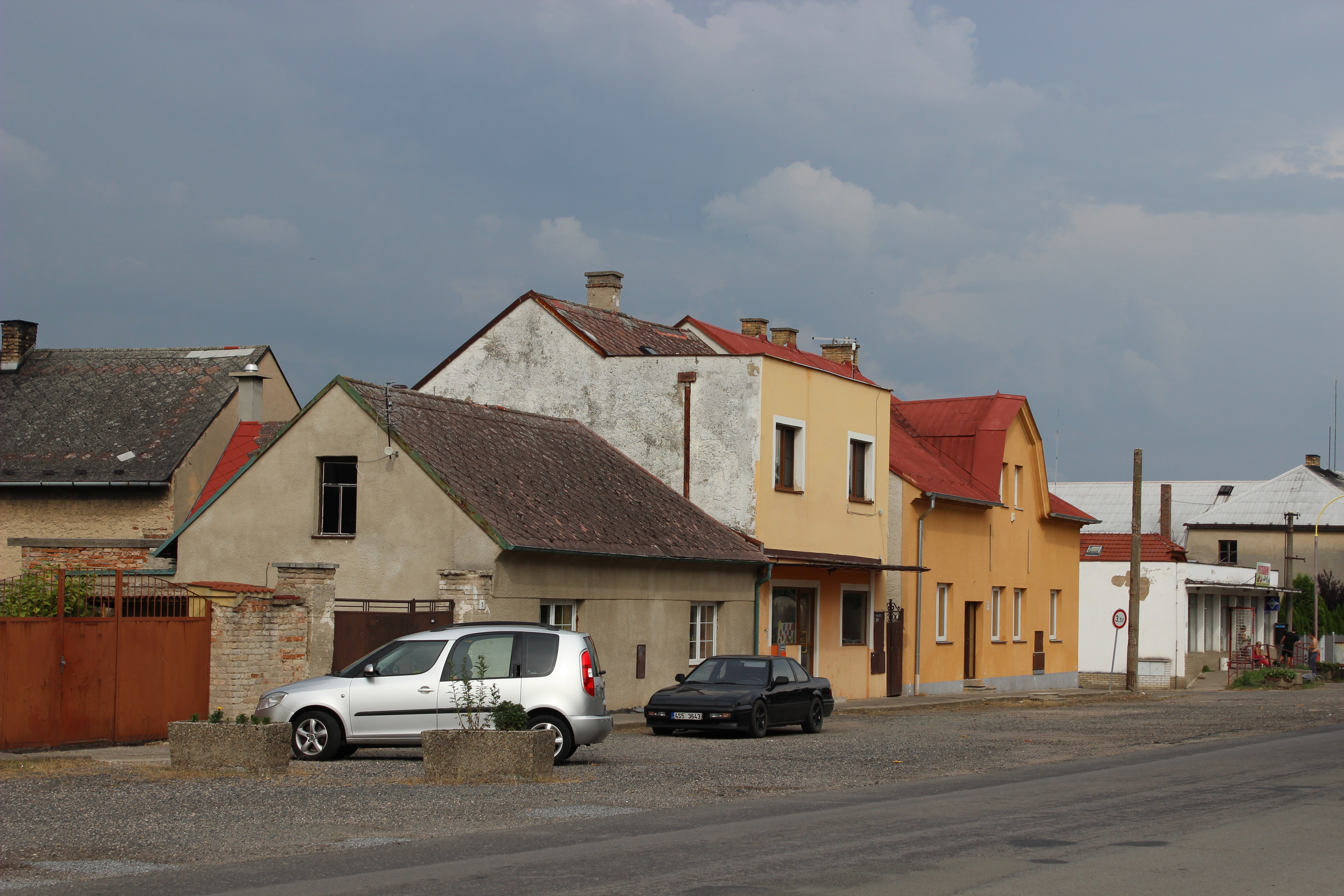
- Housing in Zdětín

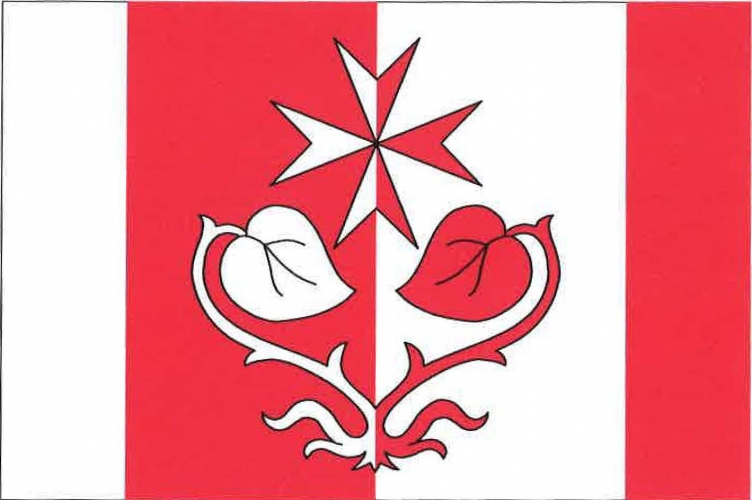
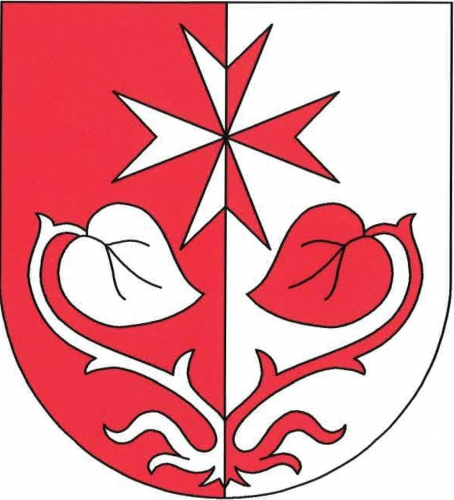
- Flag Coat of arms

- Location in the Czech Republic
- Coordinates: 50°18′46″N 14°48′45″E
- Country: Czech Republic
- Region: Central Bohemian
- District: Mladá Boleslav
- First mentioned: 1189

Area
  - Total: 7.92 km^{2} (3.06 sq mi)
- Elevation: 252 m (827 ft)

Population (2026-01-01)
  - Total: 657
  - Density: 83.0/km^{2} (215/sq mi)
- Time zone: UTC+1 (CET)
  - Summer (DST): UTC+2 (CEST)
- Postal code: 294 71
- Website: www.zdetin.net

Zdětín (German: Zdietin) is a municipality and village in Mladá Boleslav District in the Central Bohemian Region of the Czech Republic. It has about 700 inhabitants.

== Etymology ==
The name is derived from the personal name Zďata, meaning "Zďata's (court)".

== Geography ==
Zdětín is located about 13 kilometres (8 mi) southwest of Mladá Boleslav and 30 km (19 mi) northeast of Prague. It lies in a flat agricultural landscape in the Jizera Table.

== History ==
The first written mention of Zdětín is from 1189.

== Demographics ==
Historical population

Year	Pop.	±%
1869	357	—
1880	481	+34.7%
1890	517	+7.5%
1900	585	+13.2%
1910	648	+10.8%

Year	Pop.	±%
1921	690	+6.5%
1930	738	+7.0%
1950	563	−23.7%
1961	598	+6.2%
1970	524	−12.4%

Year	Pop.	±%
1980	436	−16.8%
1991	392	−10.1%
2001	420	+7.1%
2011	492	+17.1%
2021	611	+24.2%

Source: Censuses

== Transport ==
Zdětín is located on the railway line Prague–Turnov.

== Sights ==
The main landmark of Zdětín is the Church of All Saints. It is a Gothic cemetery church from the 14th century with Baroque modifications.
