= Bezdědice (Bělá pod Bezdězem) =

- Village
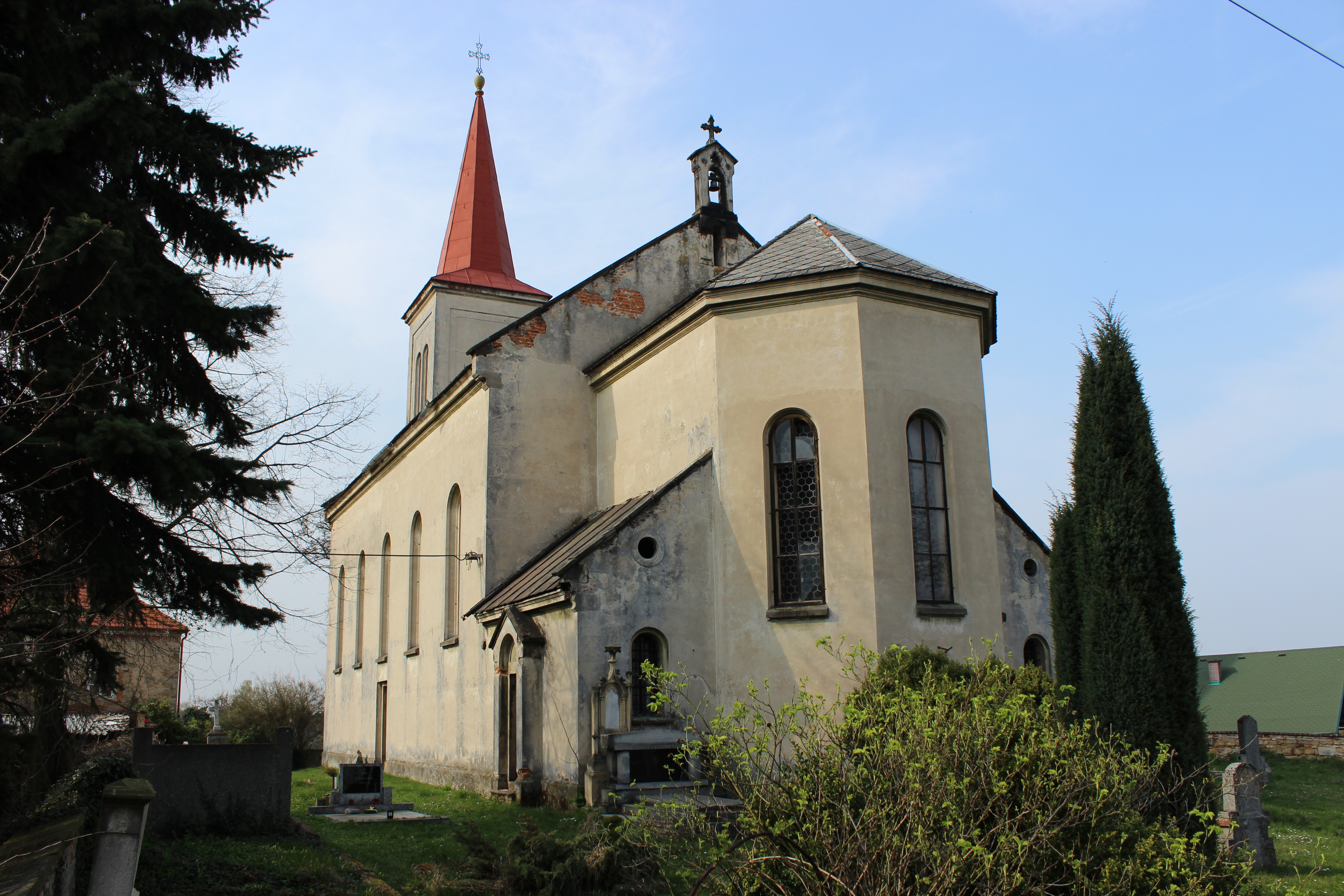
- Church of Saint Wenceslaus

- Location in the Czech Republic
- Coordinates: 50°29′1″N 14°41′46″E
- Country: Czech Republic
- Region: Central Bohemian
- District: Mladá Boleslav
- Municipality: Bělá pod Bezdězem
- First mentioned: 1337

Area
  - Total: 4.05 km^{2} (1.56 sq mi)
- Elevation: 355 m (1,165 ft)

Population (2021)
  - Total: 78
  - Density: 19/km^{2} (50/sq mi)
- Time zone: UTC+1 (CET)
  - Summer (DST): UTC+2 (CEST)
- Postal code: 294 25

Bezdědice is a village and municipal part of Bělá pod Bezdězem in Mladá Boleslav District in the Central Bohemian Region of the Czech Republic. It has about 80 inhabitants. It is located in the western part of the town's territory.

== Demographics ==
Historical population
| Year | Pop. | ±% |
|---|---|---|
| 1869 | 232 | — |
| 1880 | 219 | −5.6% |
| 1890 | 176 | −19.6% |
| 1900 | 205 | +16.5% |
| 1910 | 180 | −12.2% |
| 1921 | 199 | +10.6% |
| 1930 | 213 | +7.0% |
| 1950 | 127 | −40.4% |
| 1961 | 131 | +3.1% |
| 1970 | 103 | −21.4% |
| 1980 | 76 | −26.2% |
| 1991 | 41 | −46.1% |
| 2001 | 52 | +26.8% |
| 2011 | 52 | +0.0% |
| 2021 | 78 | +50.0% |
Source: Censuses
