= Hrdlořezy (Mladá Boleslav District) =

- Municipality
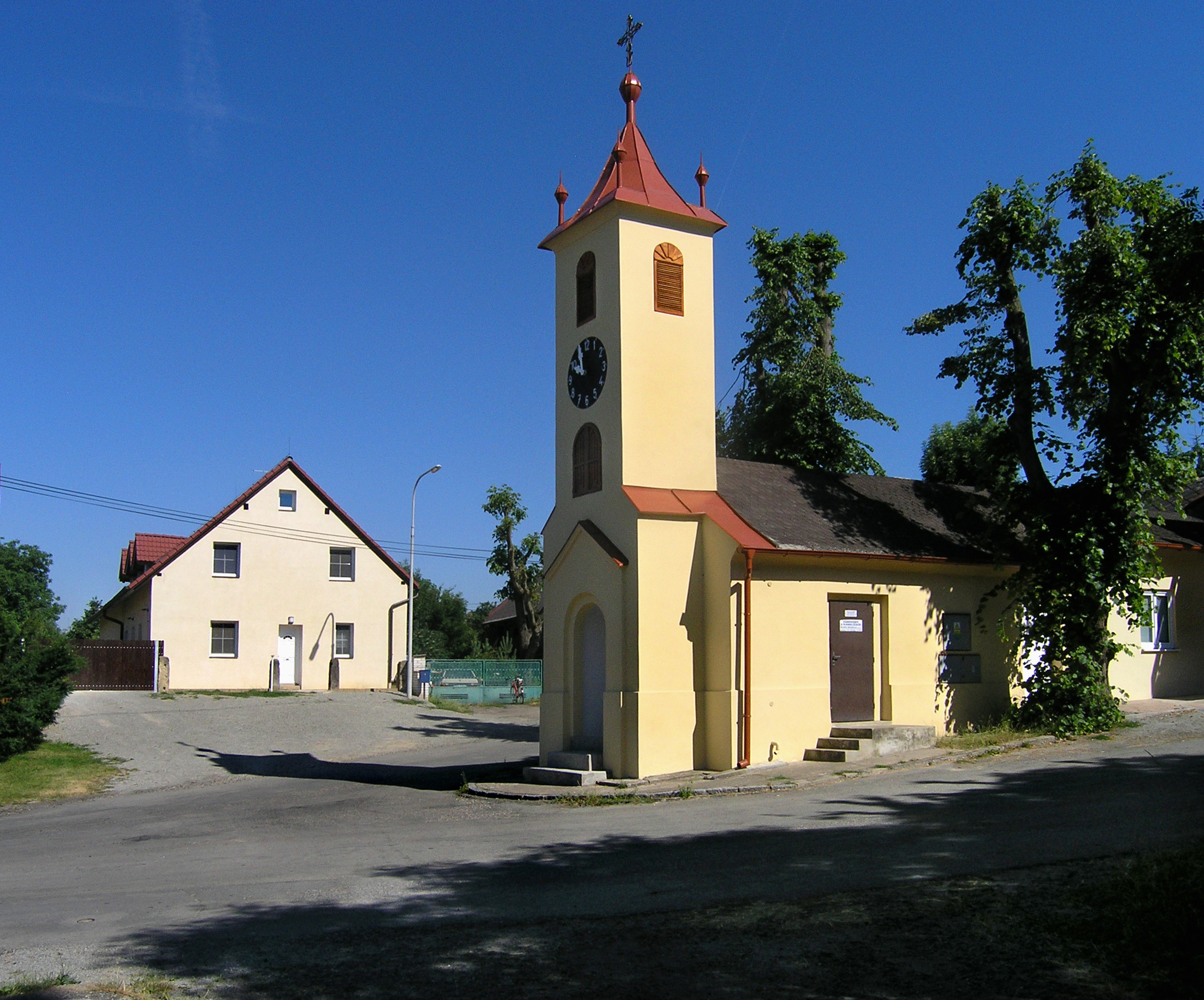
- Chapel of Saint John of Nepomuk

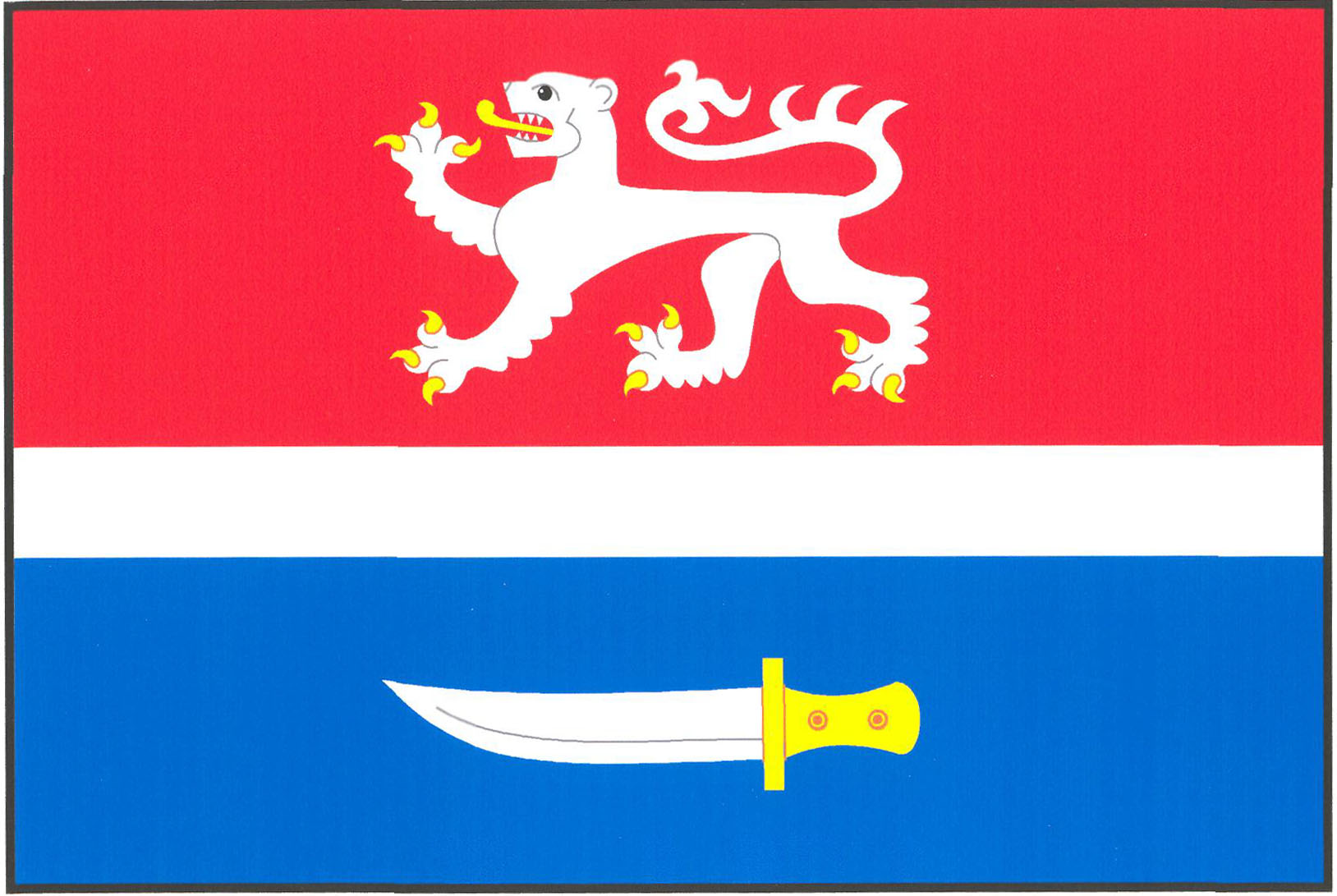
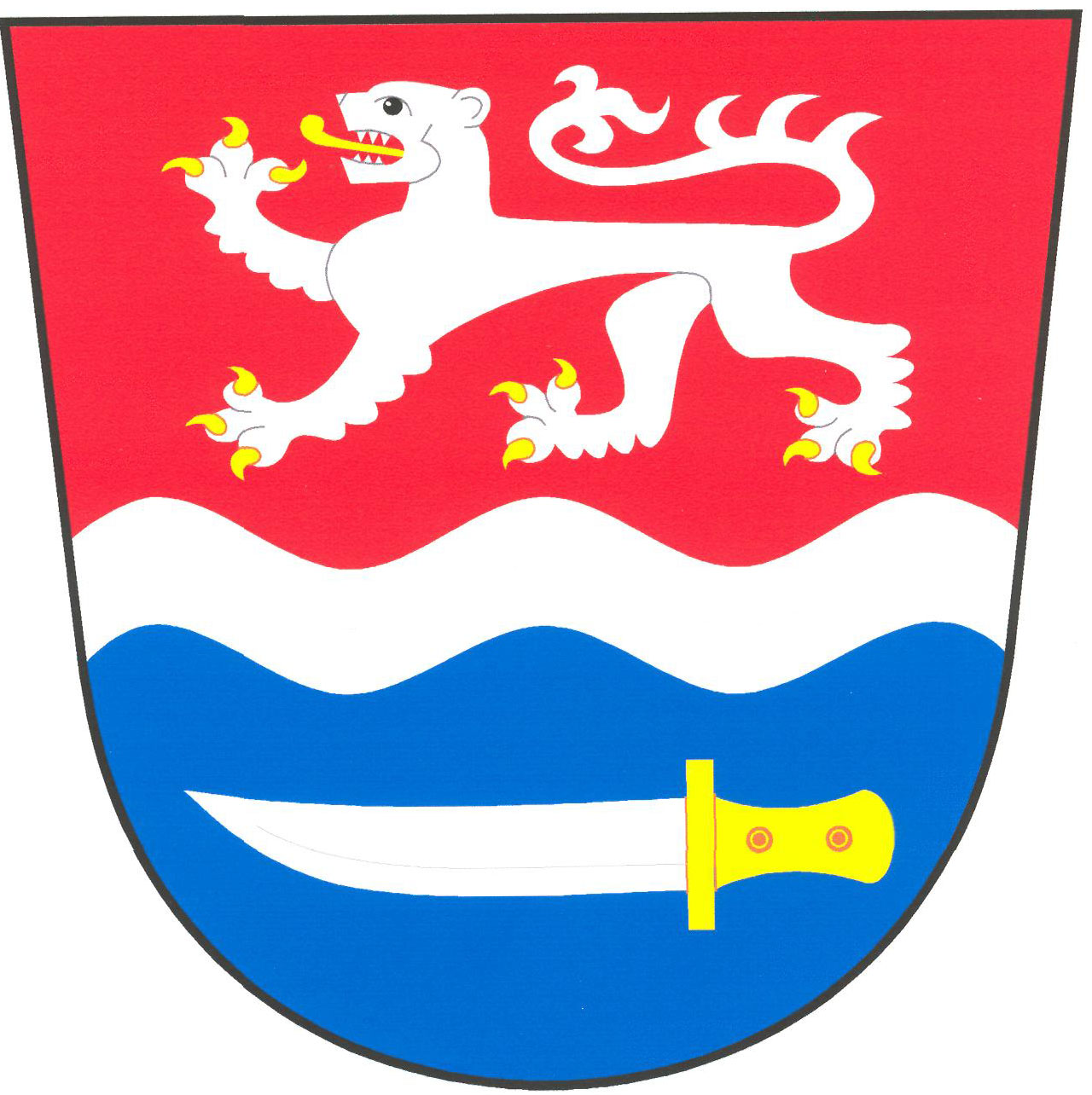
- Flag Coat of arms

- Location in the Czech Republic
- Coordinates: 50°27′5″N 14°52′32″E
- Country: Czech Republic
- Region: Central Bohemian
- District: Mladá Boleslav
- First mentioned: 1406

Area
  - Total: 9.68 km^{2} (3.74 sq mi)
- Elevation: 286 m (938 ft)

Population (2026-01-01)
  - Total: 741
  - Density: 76.5/km^{2} (198/sq mi)
- Time zone: UTC+1 (CET)
  - Summer (DST): UTC+2 (CEST)
- Postal code: 293 07
- Website: www.obechrdlorezy.cz

Hrdlořezy is a municipality and village in Mladá Boleslav District in the Central Bohemian Region of the Czech Republic. It has about 700 inhabitants.

== Etymology ==
The name consists of the Czech words hrdlo ('throat') and řezat ('cut'), and hrdlořez means 'cut-throat'. Hrdlořezy was a derisive name for a village of brawlers.

== Geography ==
Hrdlořezy is located about 3 kilometres (2 mi) northwest of Mladá Boleslav and 46 km (29 mi) northeast of Prague. It lies in the Jizera Table. The municipality is situated on the right bank of the Jizera River.

== History ==
The first written mention of Hrdlořezy is from 1406. It was a typical agricultural village.

== Demographics ==
Historical population

Year	Pop.	±%
1869	529	—
1880	601	+13.6%
1890	741	+23.3%
1900	749	+1.1%
1910	938	+25.2%

Year	Pop.	±%
1921	878	−6.4%
1930	947	+7.9%
1950	644	−32.0%
1961	659	+2.3%
1970	641	−2.7%

Year	Pop.	±%
1980	557	−13.1%
1991	490	−12.0%
2001	517	+5.5%
2011	735	+42.2%
2021	753	+2.4%

Source: Censuses

== Transport ==
The I/38 road (the section from Mladá Boleslav to Česká Lípa) runs through the municipality.

== Sights ==
The main landmark of Hrdlořezy is the Chapel of Saint John of Nepomuk, located in the centre of the village.
