= Dolní Krupá (Mladá Boleslav District) =

- Municipality
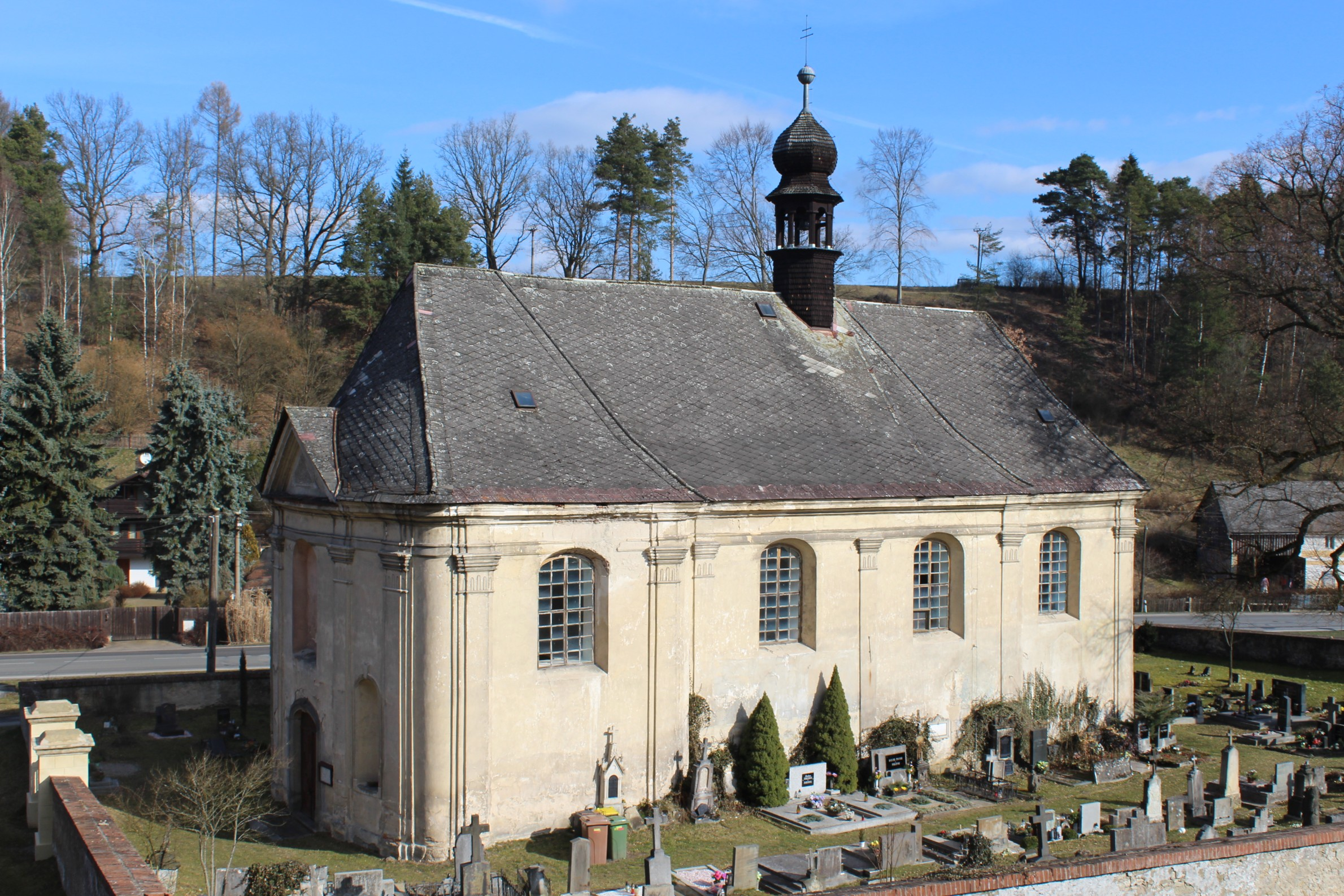
- Church of Saint Wenceslaus

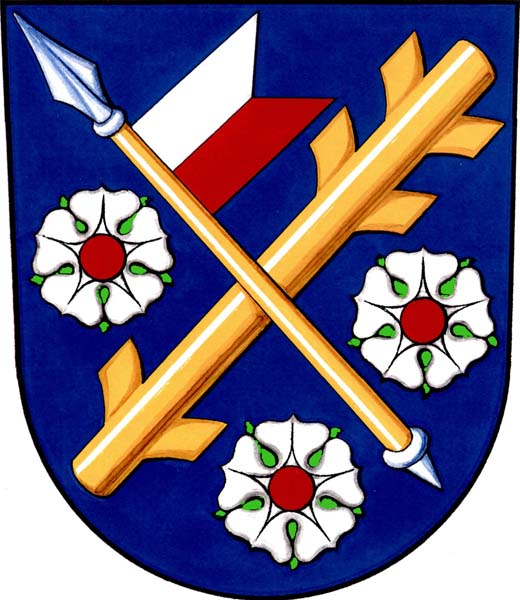
- Flag Coat of arms

- Location in the Czech Republic
- Coordinates: 50°32′47″N 14°52′2″E
- Country: Czech Republic
- Region: Central Bohemian
- District: Mladá Boleslav
- First mentioned: 1229

Area
  - Total: 11.20 km^{2} (4.32 sq mi)
- Elevation: 275 m (902 ft)

Population (2026-01-01)
  - Total: 248
  - Density: 22.1/km^{2} (57.3/sq mi)
- Time zone: UTC+1 (CET)
  - Summer (DST): UTC+2 (CEST)
- Postal code: 294 16
- Website: www.dolni-krupa.cz

Dolní Krupá is a municipality and village in Mladá Boleslav District in the Central Bohemian Region of the Czech Republic. It has about 200 inhabitants.

== Etymology ==
The name Krupá was derived from the old Czech adjective krupá, which meant 'rough', but sometimes it was also used figuratively in the meaning of 'large' ("large rock", "large hill", possibly referring to some natural feature near which the village was founded). The prefix dolní means 'lower'.

== Geography ==
Dolní Krupá is located about 14 kilometres (9 mi) north of Mladá Boleslav and 55 km (34 mi) northeast of Prague. It lies in the Jizera Table. The highest point is the hill Radechov at 392 m (1,286 ft) above sea level, whose peak is protected as a nature monument.

== History ==
The first written mention of Krupá is from 1229. In 1766 Krupá was divided into two villages, Horní Krupá (today part of Ralsko) and Dolní Krupá. Until the 19th century, the local population made a living from agriculture and forestry, then crafts developed.

== Demographics ==
Historical population

Year	Pop.	±%
1869	449	—
1880	450	+0.2%
1890	514	+14.2%
1900	462	−10.1%
1910	409	−11.5%

Year	Pop.	±%
1921	409	+0.0%
1930	437	+6.8%
1950	324	−25.9%
1961	313	−3.4%
1970	278	−11.2%

Year	Pop.	±%
1980	210	−24.5%
1991	160	−23.8%
2001	164	+2.5%
2011	202	+23.2%
2021	231	+14.4%

Source: Censuses

== Transport ==
There are no railways or major roads passing through the municipality.

== Sights ==
The main landmark of Dolní Krupá is the Church of Saint Wenceslaus. It is a Baroque church from the second half of the 18th century.

The Baroque rectory next to the church is also a cultural monument. Today it houses a branch of the Museum of the Mladá Boleslav Region.
