= Bezdědice (Hostomice) =

- Village
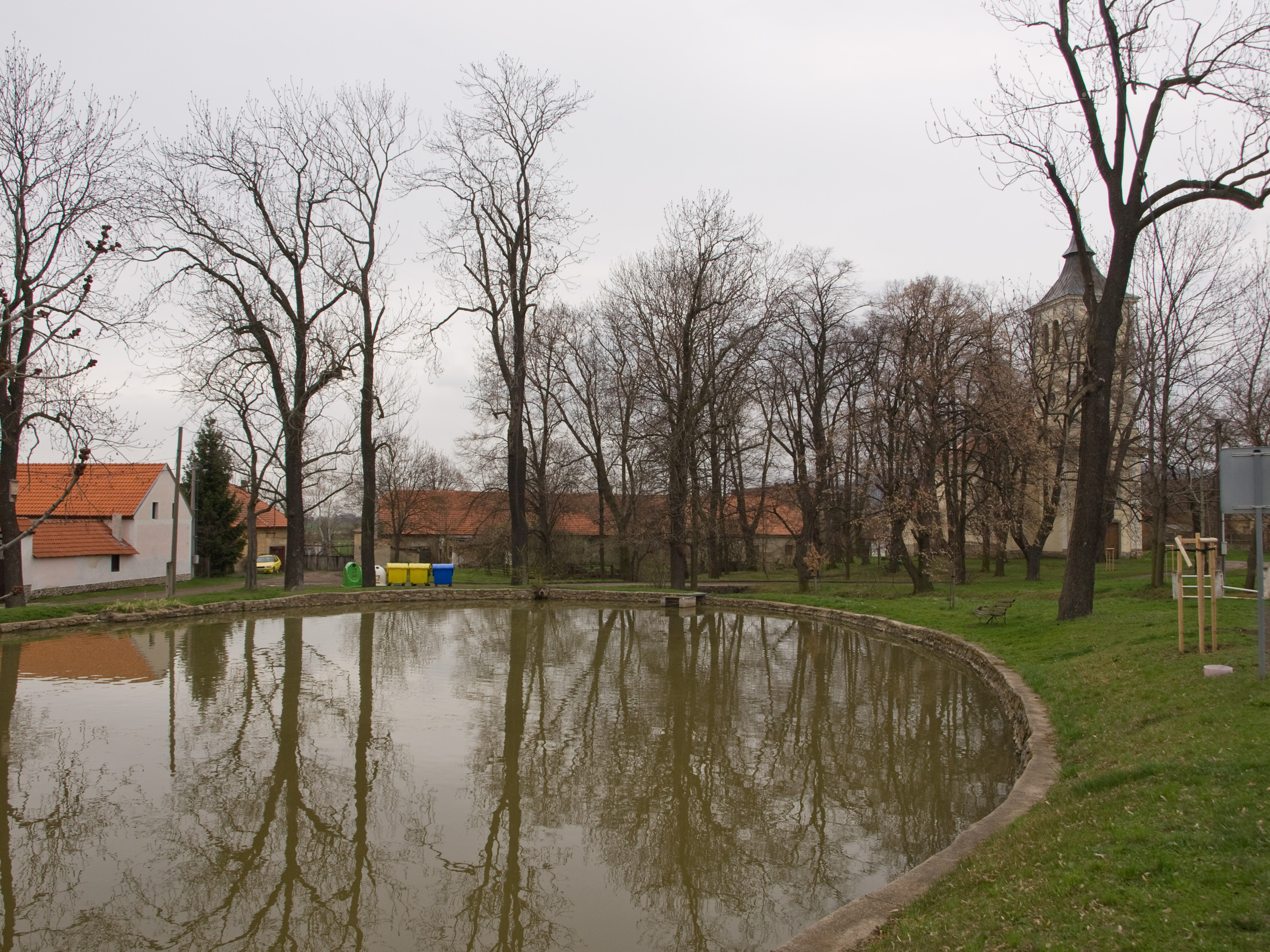
- Centre of Bezdědice

- Location in the Czech Republic
- Coordinates: 49°50′0″N 14°1′42″E
- Country: Czech Republic
- Region: Central Bohemian
- District: Beroun
- Municipality: Hostomice
- First mentioned: 1352

Area
  - Total: 2.06 km^{2} (0.80 sq mi)
- Elevation: 337 m (1,106 ft)

Population (2021)
  - Total: 144
  - Density: 69.9/km^{2} (181/sq mi)
- Time zone: UTC+1 (CET)
  - Summer (DST): UTC+2 (CEST)
- Postal code: 267 24

Bezdědice is a village and municipal part of Hostomice in Beroun District in the Central Bohemian Region of the Czech Republic. It has about 150 inhabitants.

== Demographics ==
Historical population
Year	Pop.	±%
1869	310	—
1880	315	+1.6%
1890	246	−21.9%
1900	276	+12.2%
1910	266	−3.6%
1921	222	−16.5%
1930	203	−8.6%
1950	173	−14.8%
1961	129	−25.4%
1970	102	−20.9%
1980	89	−12.7%
1991	66	−25.8%
2001	65	−1.5%
2011	117	+80.0%
2021	144	+23.1%
Source: Censuses
