= Bělá pod Bezdězem =

- Town
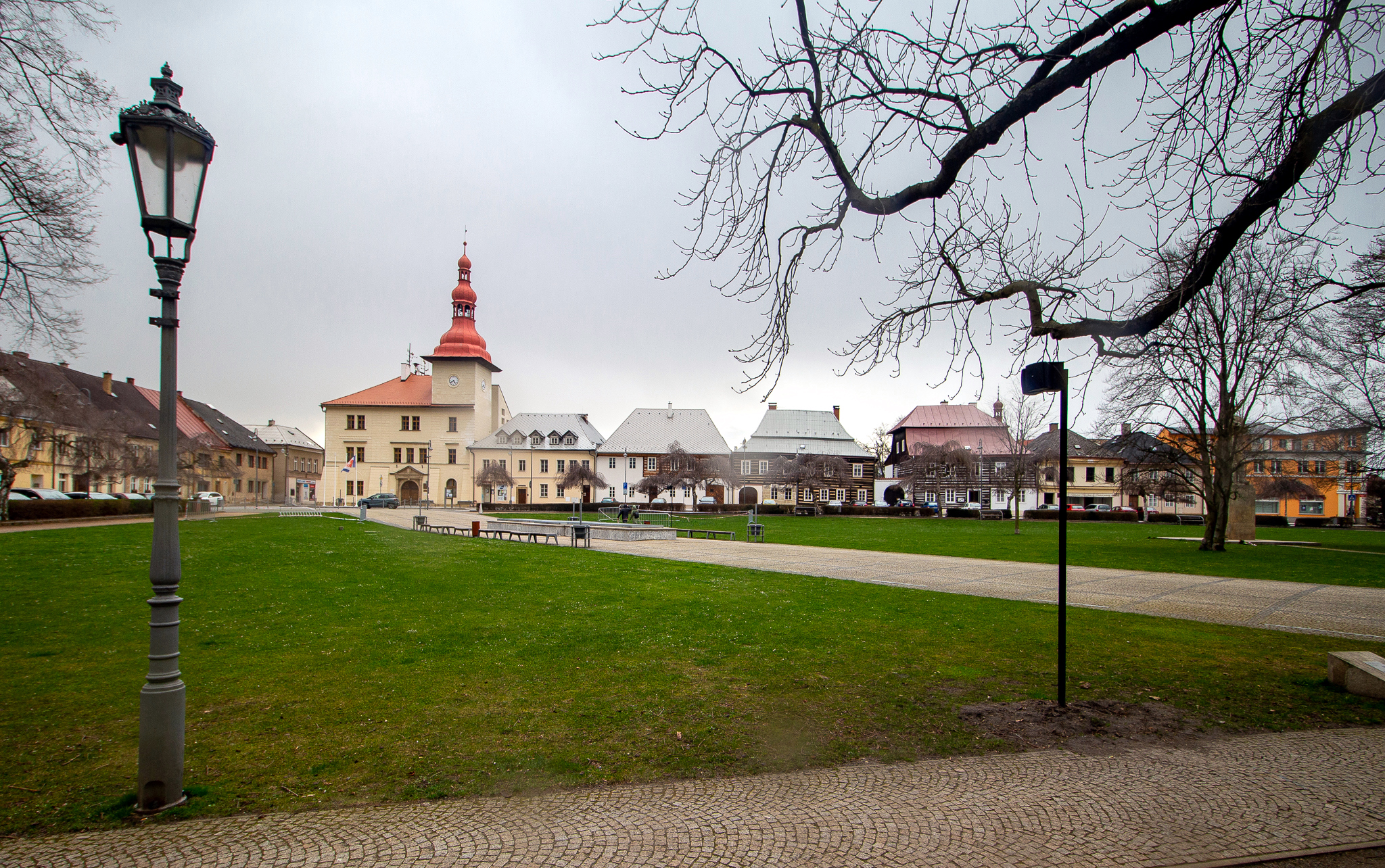
- Town square

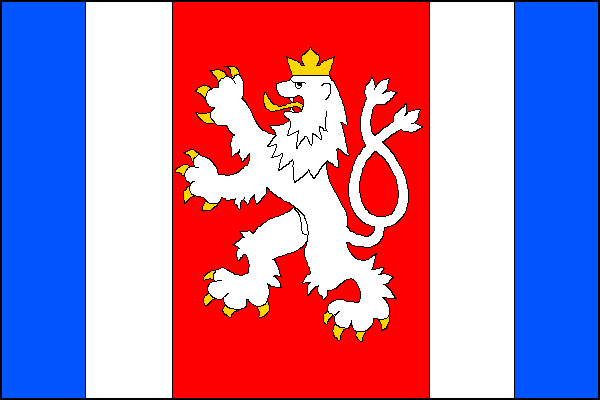
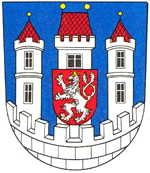
- Flag Coat of arms

- Location in the Czech Republic
- Coordinates: 50°30′4″N 14°48′15″E
- Country: Czech Republic
- Region: Central Bohemian
- District: Mladá Boleslav
- First mentioned: 1304

Government
  - Mayor: Jitka Tošovská

Area
  - Total: 63.21 km^{2} (24.41 sq mi)
- Elevation: 301 m (988 ft)

Population (2026-01-01)
  - Total: 4,815
  - Density: 76.17/km^{2} (197.3/sq mi)
- Time zone: UTC+1 (CET)
  - Summer (DST): UTC+2 (CEST)
- Postal codes: 294 21, 294 25
- Website: www.mubela.cz

Bělá pod Bezdězem (Czech pronunciation: [ˈbjɛlaː ˈpod bɛzɟɛzɛm]; German: Weisswasser) is a town in Mladá Boleslav District in the Central Bohemian Region of the Czech Republic. It has about 4,800 inhabitants. It is located on the Bělá Stream in the Jizera Table.

Bělá pod Bezdězem is known for one of the largest town squares in the Czech Republic. The historic town centre is well preserved and is protected as an urban monument zone.

== Administrative division ==
Bělá pod Bezdězem consists of five municipal parts (in brackets population according to the 2021 census):

- Bělá pod Bezdězem (4,320)
- Bezdědice (78)
- Březinka (134)
- Hlínoviště (174)
- Vrchbělá (19)

Bezdědice forms an exclave of the municipal territory.

== Etymology ==
The town's name is derived from the local stream Bělá and the nearby hill Bezděz. The town was first named Nový Bezděz ('new Bezděz'), but soon the name changed to Bělá.

== Geography ==
Bělá pod Bezdězem is located about 11 kilometres (7 mi) northwest of Mladá Boleslav and 49 km (30 mi) northeast of Prague. It lies in the Jizera Table with an exception of the Bezdědice exclave, which belongs to the Ralsko Uplands. The highest point is the hill Lysá hora at 365 m (1,198 ft) above sea level; the hill of Bezděz included in the town's name lies outside the municipal territory. The Bělá Stream originates here and flows through the town.

== History ==
Bělá pod Bezdězem was founded in 1304. Until 1398 it was a royal town. In the 16th and early 17th centuries, it was owned by the Berka of Dubá family. After their properties were confiscated after the Battle of White Mountain, Bělá pod Bezdězem was purchased by Albrecht von Wallenstein in 1622. After his death in 1634, it was acquired by Count Caretto-Millesimo. He sold the town to the Waldstein family in 1678 and they owned it until 1848.

== Demographics ==
Historical population

Year	Pop.	±%
1869	4,274	—
1880	4,214	−1.4%
1890	4,351	+3.3%
1900	4,622	+6.2%
1910	5,381	+16.4%

Year	Pop.	±%
1921	5,106	−5.1%
1930	5,662	+10.9%
1950	4,334	−23.5%
1961	4,642	+7.1%
1970	4,842	+4.3%

Year	Pop.	±%
1980	4,923	+1.7%
1991	4,736	−3.8%
2001	4,789	+1.1%
2011	4,890	+2.1%
2021	4,725	−3.4%

Source: Censuses

== Transport ==
The I/38 road (the section which connects Mladá Boleslav with Česká Lípa) runs next to the town.

Bělá pod Bezdězem is located on the railway line Kolín–Rumburk.

== Sights ==
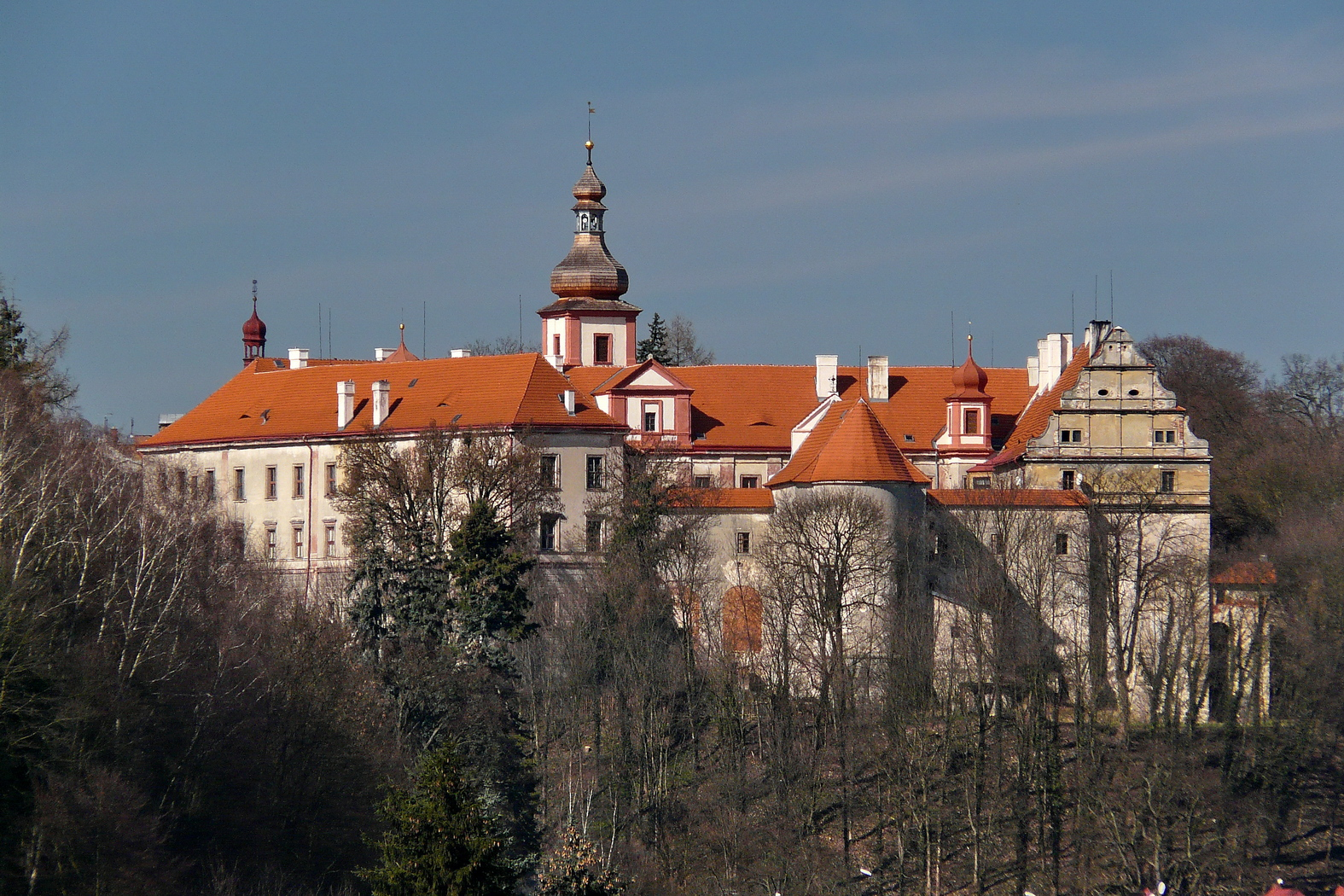
Bělá Castle

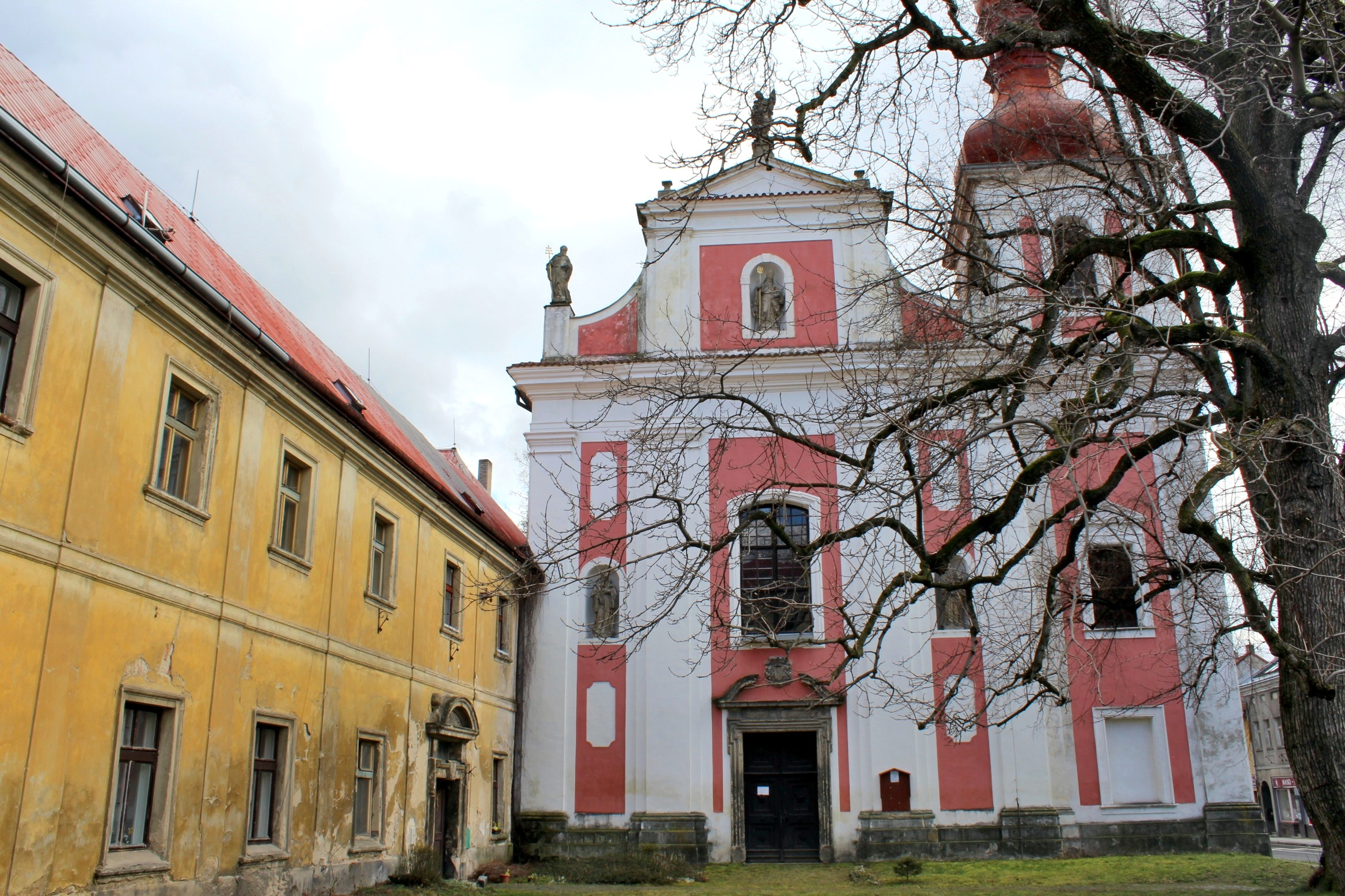
Church of Saint Wenceslaus and part of the convent

The historic centre of Bělá pod Bezdězem is protected as an urban monument zone. It is formed by the square Masarykovo náměstí, surrounding streets and the castle complex. The square has an area of 2.5 ha (6.2 acres) and is among the largest town squares in the Czech Republic.

Among the main landmarks of the town square is the town hall. It was built in 1613 and the second floor was added in 1852.

In 1337, building of the town walls was finished. Their fragments have been preserved to this day. Bělá Castle was built on the place of a former fortress in 1582–1615. Today it houses a museum.

The former Augustinian convent was built in 1345. Today, there are flats in the convent buildings. The Church of Saint Wenceslaus was built next to the monastery in the Baroque style in 1708–1712.

The Church of the Exaltation of the Holy Cross was built in the Gothic style in the early 14th century and rebuilt in the Baroque style in 1655. It used to be a cemetery church. Three of the preserved tombstones are valuable and are protected as a cultural monument together with the church.

In Vrchbělá is a sports and recreational area with an area of 60 ha (150 acres). It includes an observation tower, a mini zoo and trails for cycling and in-line skating.

== Notable people ==
- Václav Trégl (1902–1979), actor
- Luděk Pachman (1924–2003), Czech-German chess grandmaster

== Twin towns – sister cities ==
Bělá pod Bezdězem is twinned with:

- Groß-Bieberau, Germany
- Svätý Jur, Slovakia
