= Jizera Table =

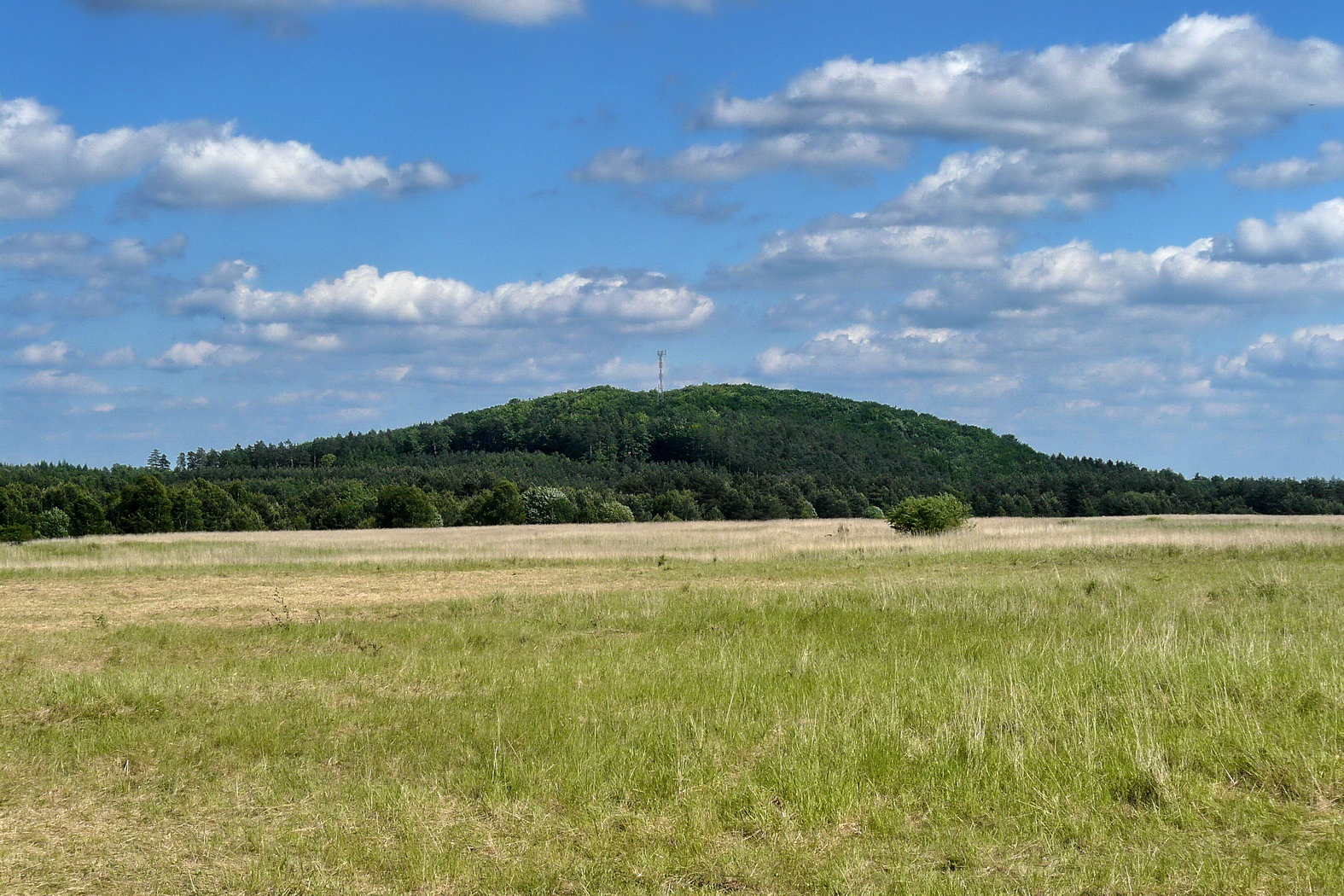
- The hill Jezovská hora

Highest point
- Peak: Rokytská horka
- Elevation: 410 m (1,350 ft)

Dimensions
- Length: 45 km (28 mi)
- Area: 949 km^{2} (366 mi^{2})

Geography
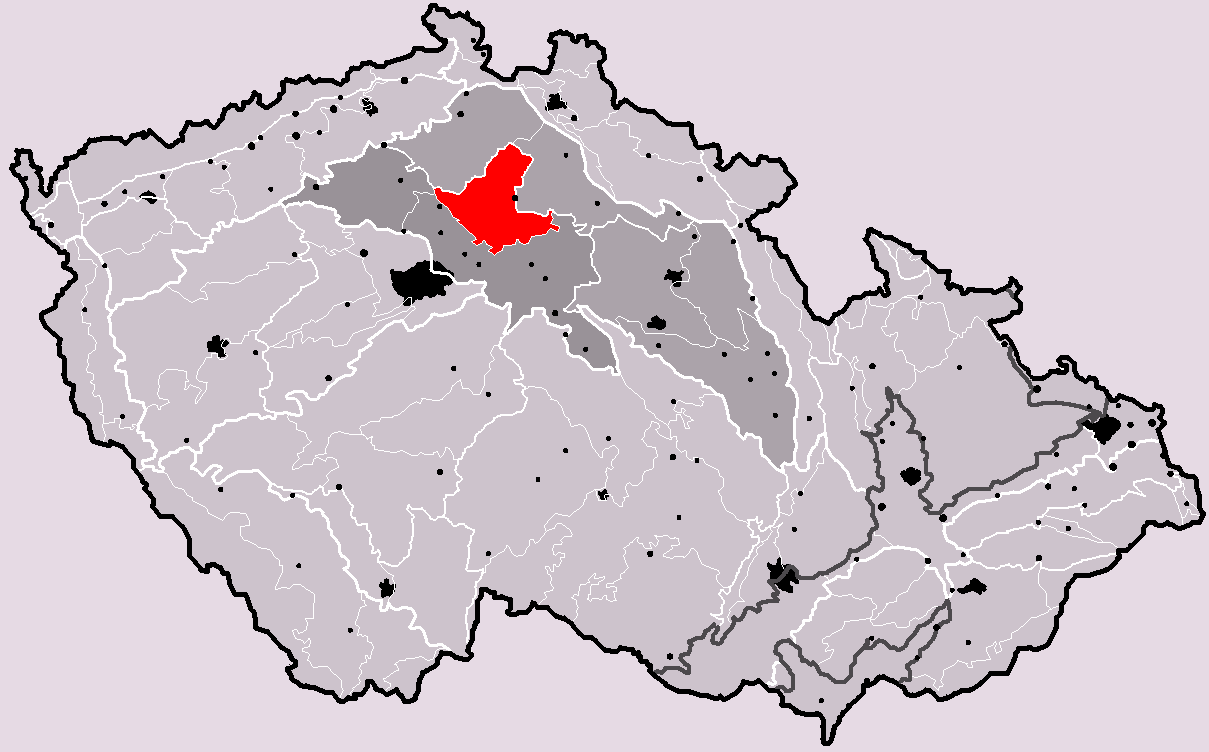
- Jizera Table in the geomorphological system of the Czech Republic
- Country: Czech Republic
- Region: Central Bohemian
- Range coordinates: 50°22′N 14°48′E
- Parent range: Central Bohemian Table

Geology
- Rock type(s): Sandstone, claystone, marlstone, siltstone, basalt

The Jizera Table (Czech: Jizerská tabule) is a plateau and a geomorphological mesoregion of the Czech Republic. It is located mostly in the Central Bohemian Region, northeast of Prague.

== Geomorphology ==
The Jizera Table is a mesoregion of the Central Bohemian Table within the Bohemian Massif. It is a height-constant denudation plateau divided by erosion notches. The plateau is further subdivided into the microregions of Central Jizera Table and Lower Jizera Table.

The area is rich in low peaks. The highest peaks are Rokytská horka at 410 metres (1,350 ft) above sea level, Jezovská hora at 400 metres (1,300 ft) and Radechov at 392 metres (1,286 ft), all located in the northern part of the Jizera Table.

== Geography ==
The territory is approximately anchor-shaped. The plateau has an area of 949 square kilometres (366 sq mi) and an average elevation of 261 metres (856 ft).

The territory is mostly without watercourses. The only notable river is the Jizera, after which the plateau is named. It flows across the entire territory.

The most populated settlements entirely located in the territory are Benátky nad Jizerou, Bělá pod Bezdězem and Mšeno. Small parts of Mladá Boleslav, Mělník, Lysá nad Labem and Dobrovice also extends into the Jizera Table.

== Vegetation ==
The landscape has predominantly an agricultural character and is relatively sparsely forested.

== Gallery ==
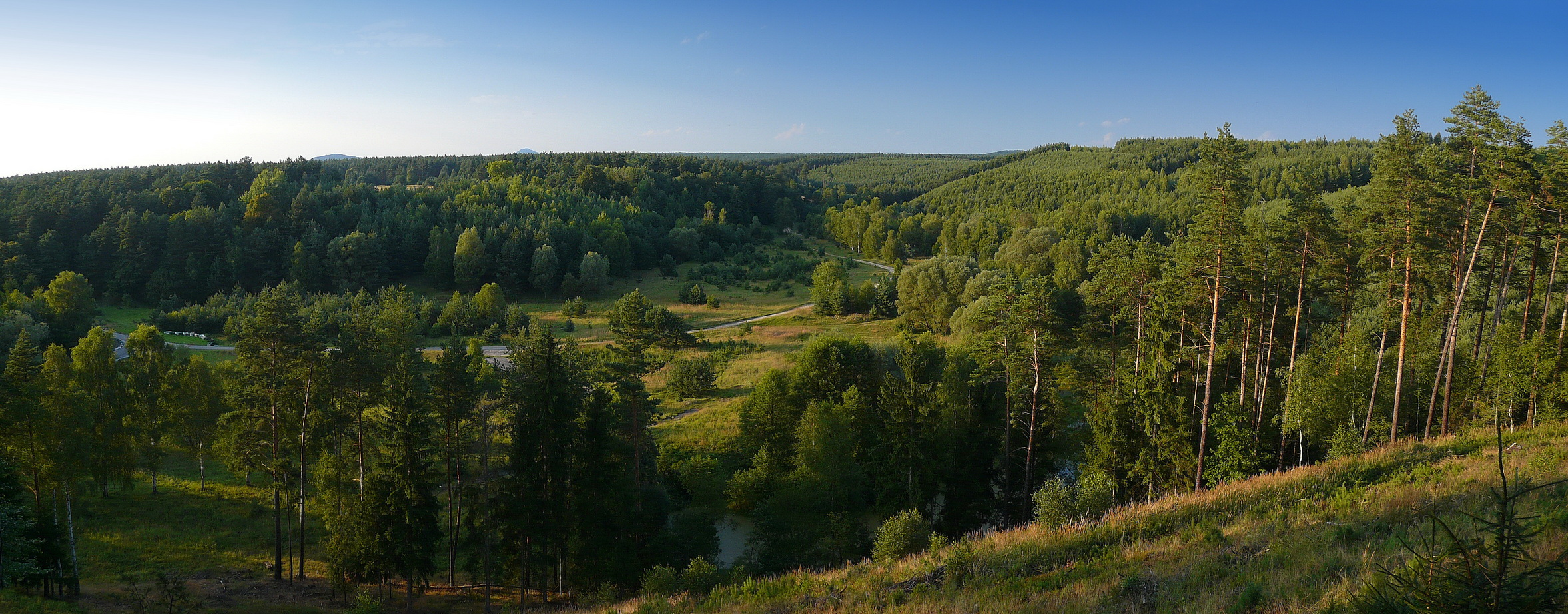
Bělá valley near Vrchbělá

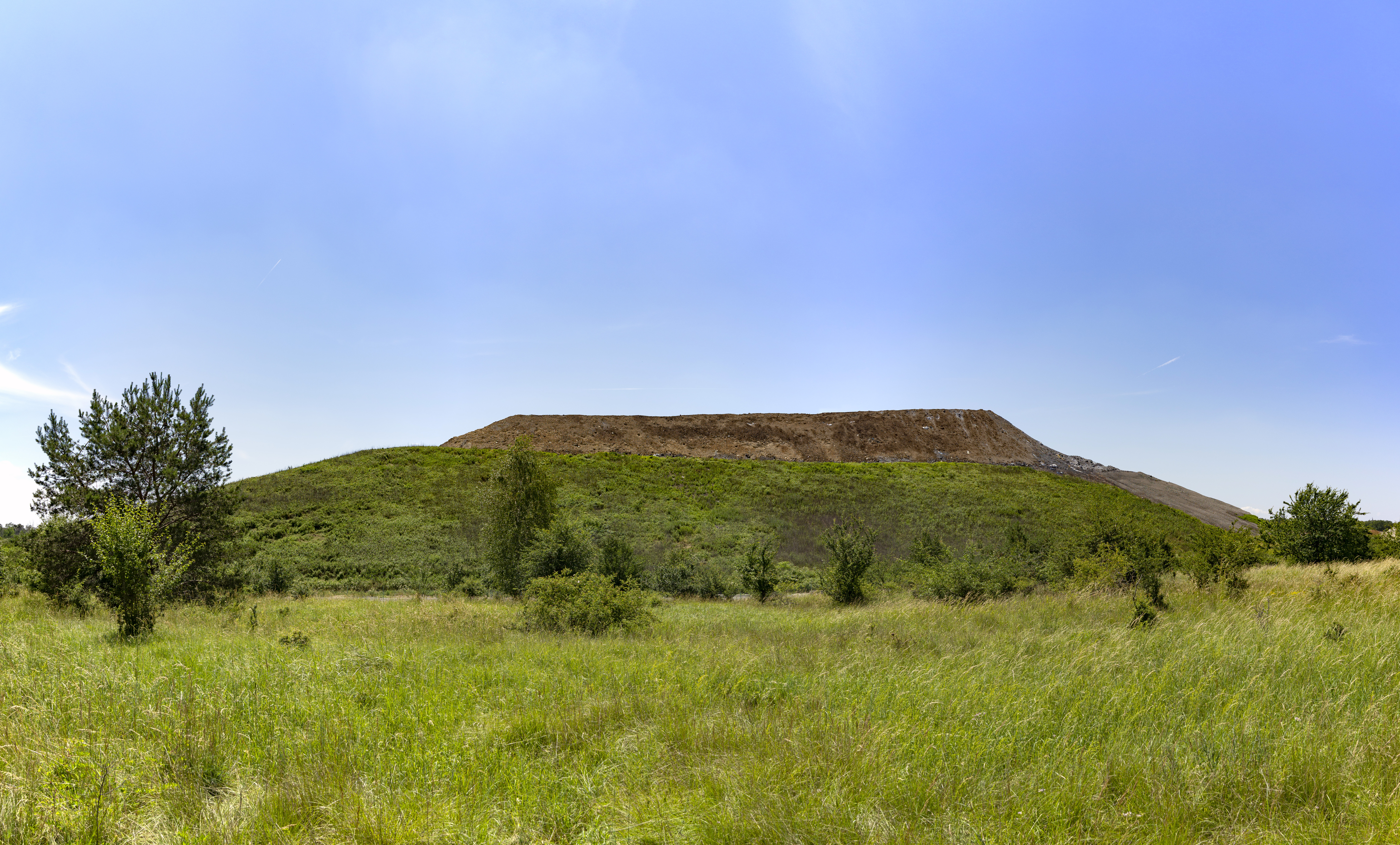
Benátecký vrch

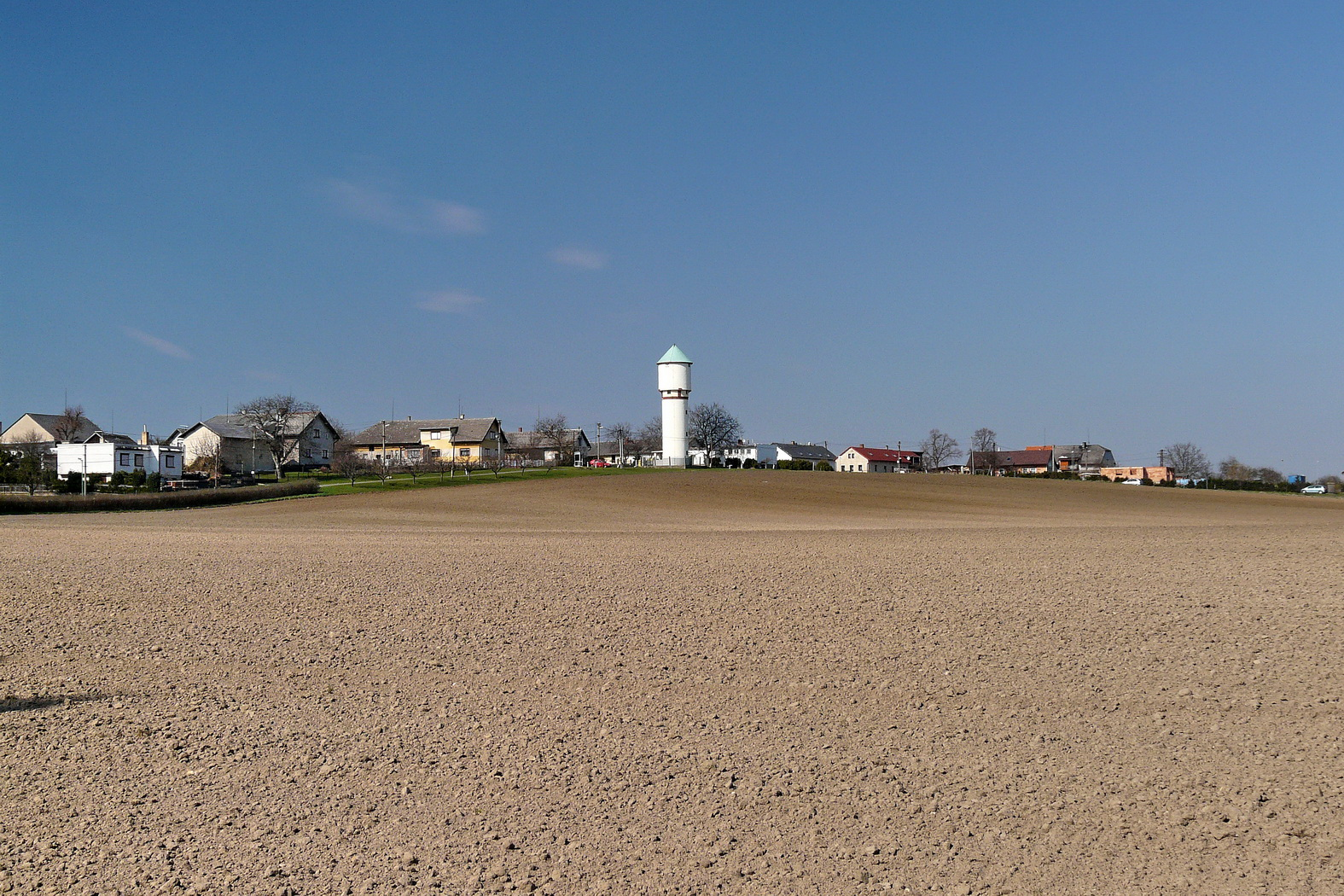
Agricultural landscape in Bílá Hlína
