= Ronov Castle =

- Hrad Ronov
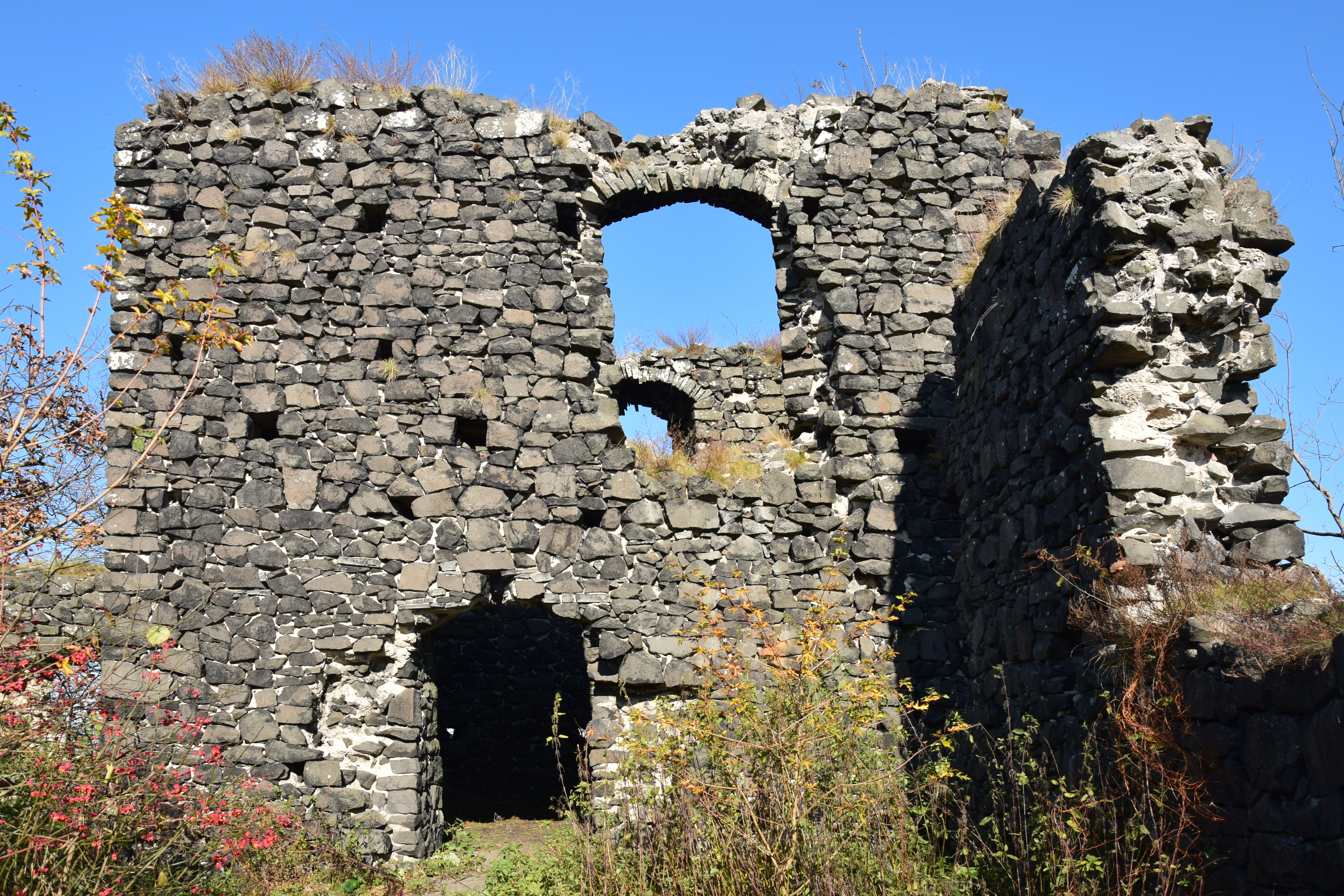
- The tower in the north-east corner with entrance to the rampart on the first floor

- Location within Czech Republic

General information
- Type: Medieval castle
- Architectural style: Gothic architecture
- Location: Blíževedly, Liberec Region, Czech Republic, Czech Republic
- Coordinates: 50°37′12″N 14°24′51″E
- Elevation: 378 m (1,240 ft)
- Owner: Lords of Klinštejn

Ronov Castle (Czech: hrad Ronov) is a castle ruin northeast of Blíževedly in the Česká Lípa District in the Liberec Region of the Czech Republic. The remains of the castle are protected as a cultural monument of the Czech Republic.

The oldest direct reports about the castle come from the 15th century. In 1438, it was owned by Vilém of Ilburk, who significantly rebuilt the castle. After 1538, Ronov castle was abandoned and gradually became a ruin.

== Geography ==
The castle is located on the top of the Ronov hill, which is part of the Ralsko Uplands. The hill is located on the territory of the Kokořínsko – Máchův kraj Protected Landscape Area, and its slope and summit are protected as a nature monument.

== History ==
The time of the foundation of the castle and its earliest history are unclear. Considering the name, there is no doubt that it was founded by a member of the Ronovci family. August Sedláček thought that the castle was founded around 1420 by Hynek Hlaváč of Dubá, but according to Dobroslava Menclová it could have been founded as early as the second half of the fourteenth century. The first written mention of the castle probably dates from 1427.

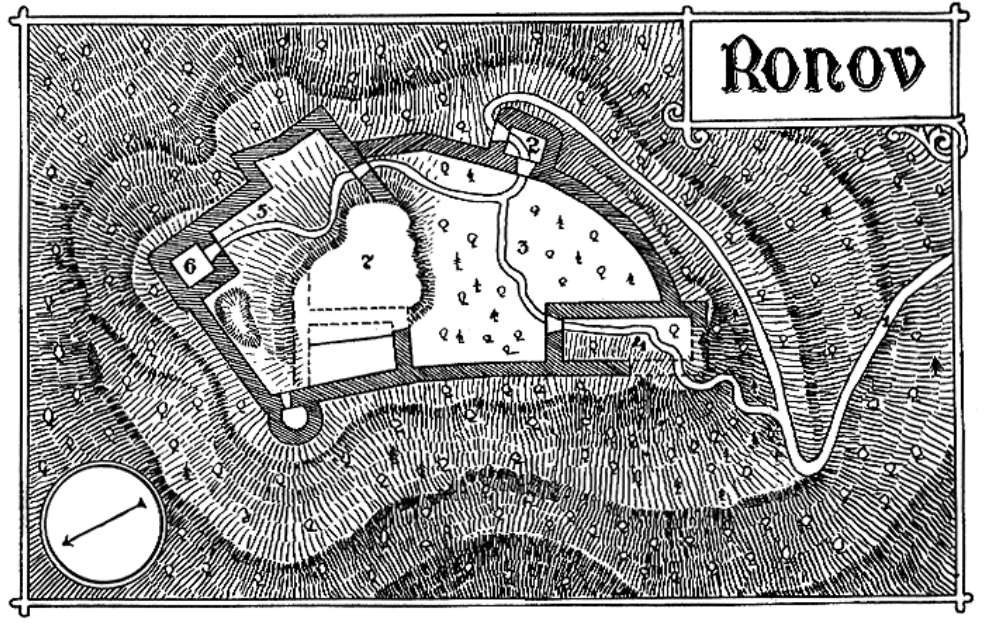
Floor plan of the castle by Josef Vítězslav Šimák published in the work of August Sedláček

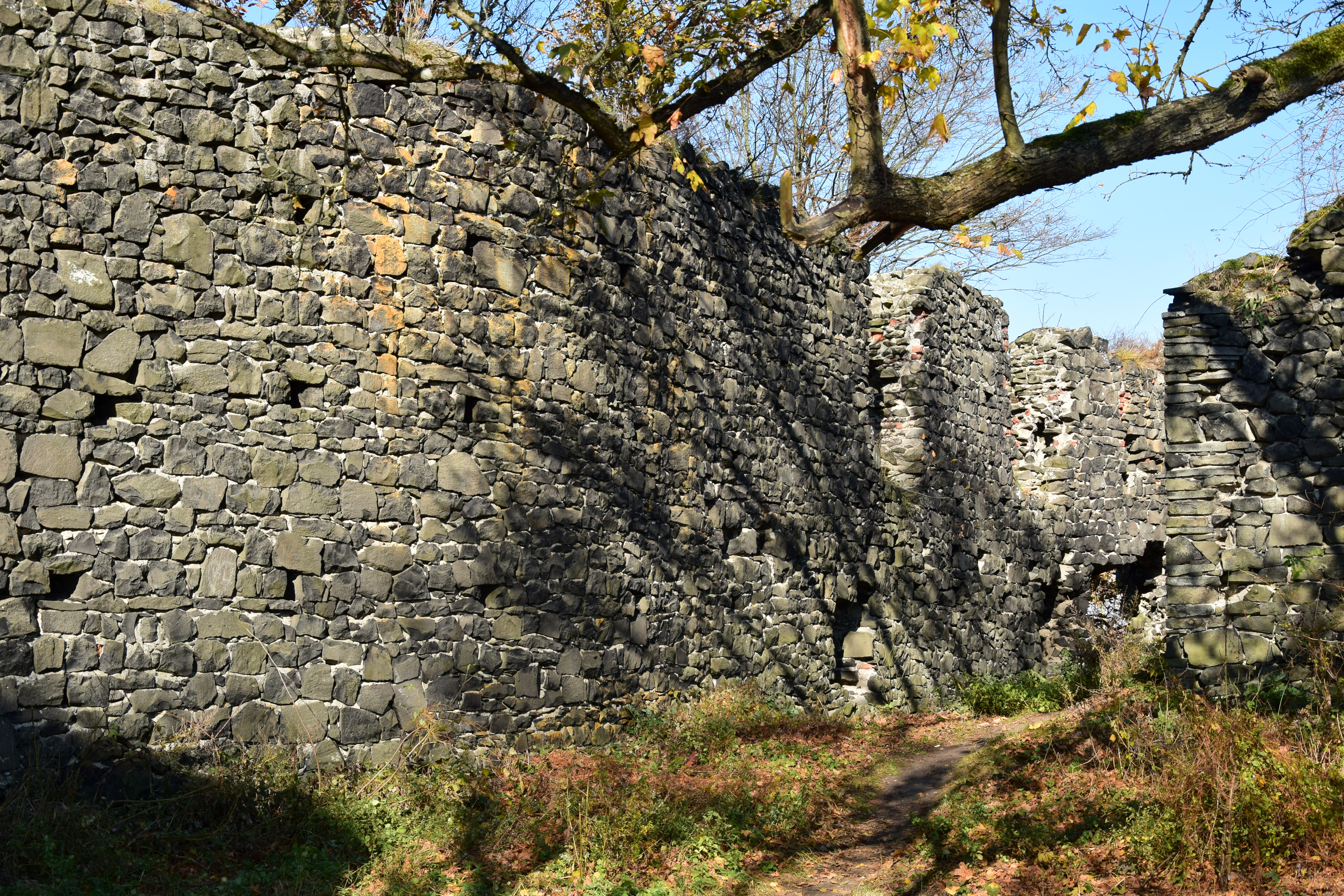
The inner side of the northern wall

Since 1348, the land around Ronov and Kravaře had been mortgaged to the brothers Hynek and Jindřich of Dubá. In 1355, they acquired it as hereditary possession, and after Hynek's death in 1361, it was inherited by his son of the same name († 1381). The son of Hynek the Younger was also named Hynek and received the surname Hlaváč. When he was a minor, his uncle Hynek of Dubá, his father's brother and lord of the Saxon castle of Hohnstein, managed the property for him. Most likely, it was he who left Kravařsko to the lords of Klinštejn, one of the subsidiary branches of the Ronovci. The aristocratic predicate of one of them, Předboře of Ronov, could be, according to Rudolf Andělthe, the first indirect mention of the castle. In that case, Ronov would have been founded in the third quarter of the fourteenth century by gentlemen from Klinštejn. Předbor's aristocratic predicate, however, refers to the Lusatian castle Ronow (also Rohnau) near Hirschfeld.

At the beginning of the Hussite Wars, the castle was controlled by Hynek Hlaváč of Dubá, who stood on the side of King Sigismund and fought against the Hussites together with the Six Cities of Lusatia. When he died in 1423, his property was inherited by the brothers Jaroslav and Jindřich Berka of Dubá. Jaroslav died childless in 1432. Jindřich remained the owner of the castle until at least 1437, but Vilém of Ilburk acquired the castle from him shortly afterwards.

Vilém of Ilburk was an ally of the lords of Wartenberg in their battles with Šestiměstí. Therefore, the people of Lusatia sent out a military expedition in 1444, which joined forces with the Litoměřice landfryde and Těma of Koldice. Their army then unsuccessfully besieged Mikeš Pancíř's Sloup castle, but captured Rybnov, Stvolínky and the towns of Žandov, Česká Kamenice and Osečná. The military conflict lasted until December 1444, but Ronov was not conquered during it.

In 1505, Vilém's eponymous son assigned Ronov and the small town of Stvolínky as a dowry to his wife Anežka from Helfenstein. She also became the sole heir after his death in 1538. After her death the property was to go to their daughter Anna. Anežka moved from the inaccessible castle to the fortress in Stvolínky. The castle was still maintained for some time, but when Elizabeth of Wartenberg sold Stvolínky to Adam Hrzán of Harasov in 1608, it was marked as deserted.

During the Thirty Years' War, the castle served as a refuge for residents from the surrounding villages, who hid property there. In 1643, it was captured and burned by the Swedish army. In 1845, the owner of the Stvolínky estate at the time, Bishop Augustin Bartolomej Hille of Litoměřice, had Ron's Stations of the Cross built on the top. During its construction, the palace was largely demolished and a cross erected in its place. The Way of the Cross was modified in 1891, but over time it completely disappeared.

== Building form ==
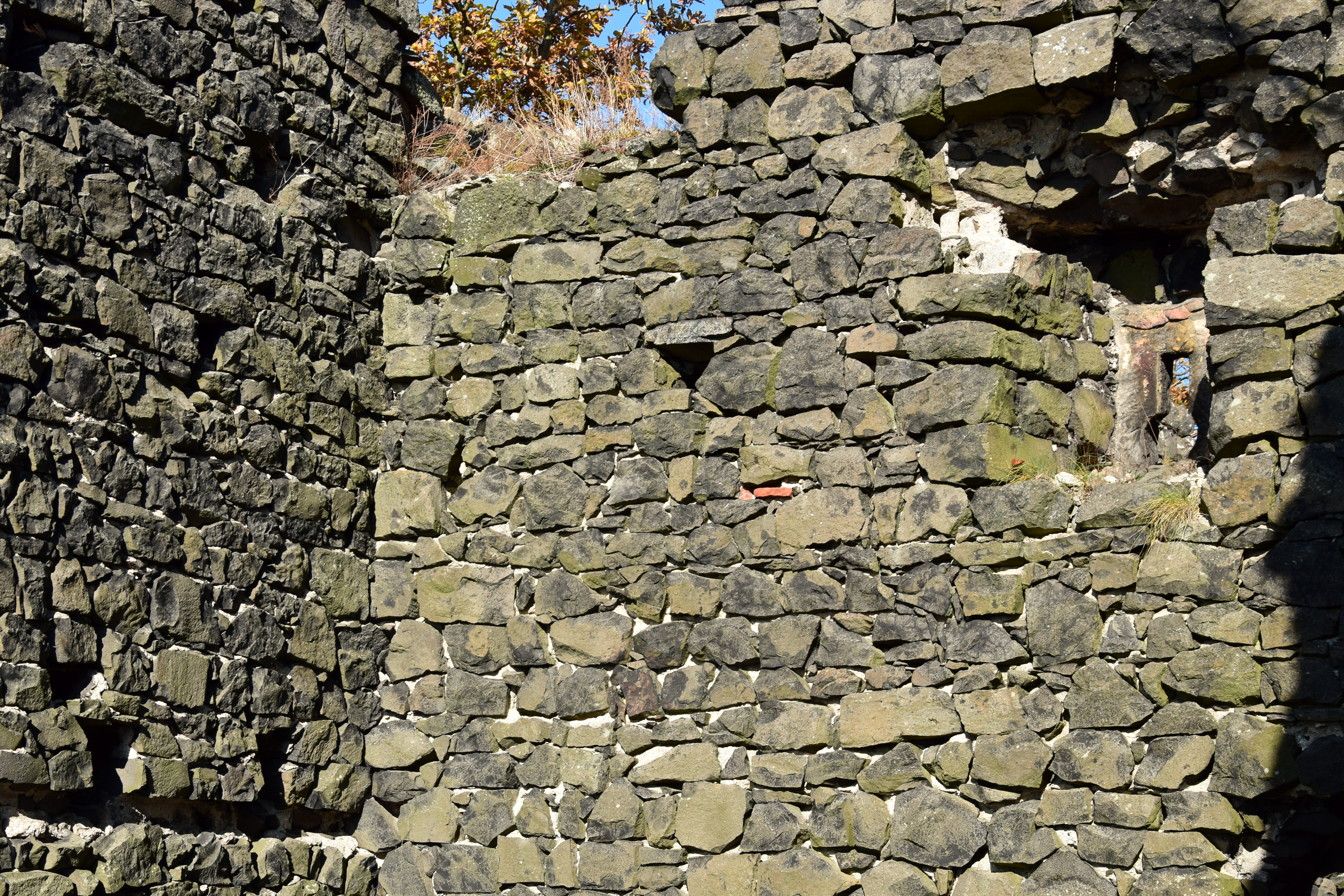
First floor interior of southwest residential building with keyhole

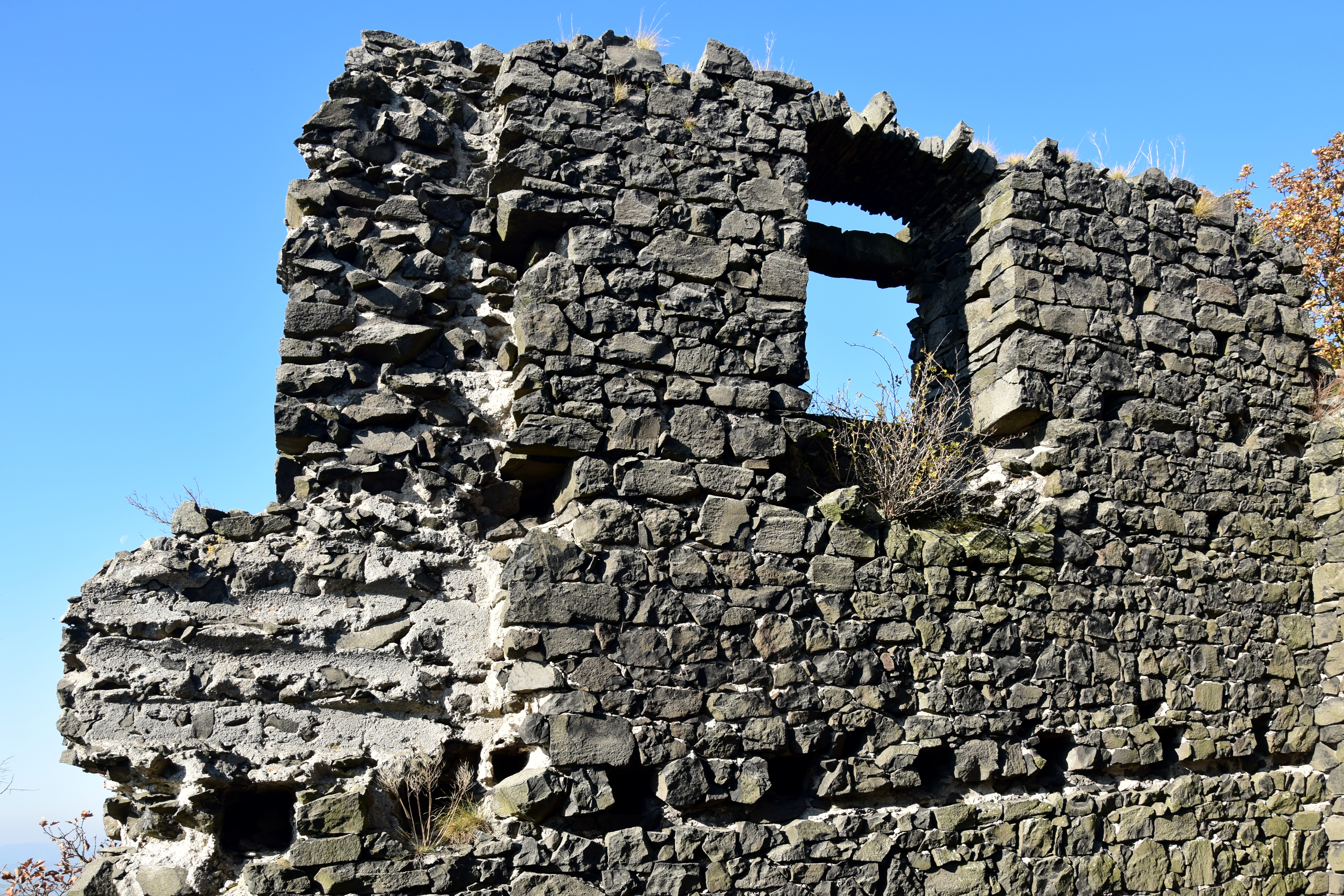
Interior of the first floor of the southwest residential building with a window and timber chamber impression

Ronov was built in two construction phases. The older one probably only consisted of a residential tower, of which almost nothing has survived. The ruins are the remains of the buildings that Vilém of Ilburk had built. For him, the castle acquired a two-part or three-part disposition. The castle's position on a dominant and difficult-to-access hill provided protection from advancing artillery. Elements of active defense are also visible in the fortification system, but they belong to the early and not very effective solutions of active artillery defense. Their quality was reduced by the separated sections of the walls, along whose walkways the defenders could not move smoothly, and the impossibility of shooting curtains at all.

The vast majority of the masonry is built from local basalt, which is only occasionally supplemented with hewn sandstone elements or bricks and tiles. The main defensive element was an eighty to one hundred centimeter thick wall, in front of which two bastions stand out, whose slotted windows allowed the shooting of arrows.

Entry to the castle was made possible by a gate, the building of which is partially preserved on the south side. The path turned at right angles in the passage and entered the first courtyard. The central rock and the wall attached to it divided the interior of the castle into the southwestern and northeastern parts. The second of them was entered through another gate in the rampart at the southeastern foot of the rock.

The building in the southwest corner had a residential character. The ground floor was lit only by small ventilation windows, and the first floor was entered through a wooden structure through an opening in the southeast wall. Behind the entrance was an approximately square room lit by a window with a sandstone lintel preserved. There is a sandstone embrasure in the northeast wall, which made it possible to shell the area of the first courtyard. In the southwestern part of the first floor, there was a wooden chamber.

Determining the function of the northeastern building is problematic. The large windows facing the outside of the castle lead to the assumption that the building had a residential function. On the first floor, however, there was only a footbridge that connected a pair of doors that led to the walkways of the adjacent sections of the walls. A building of unclear purpose also stood between the summit rock and the northwest wall. The castle palace stood on a rock that exceeds the area of the courtyard by about five meters. Only tiny foundations have survived from it.
