= Velká Bukovina =

- Municipality
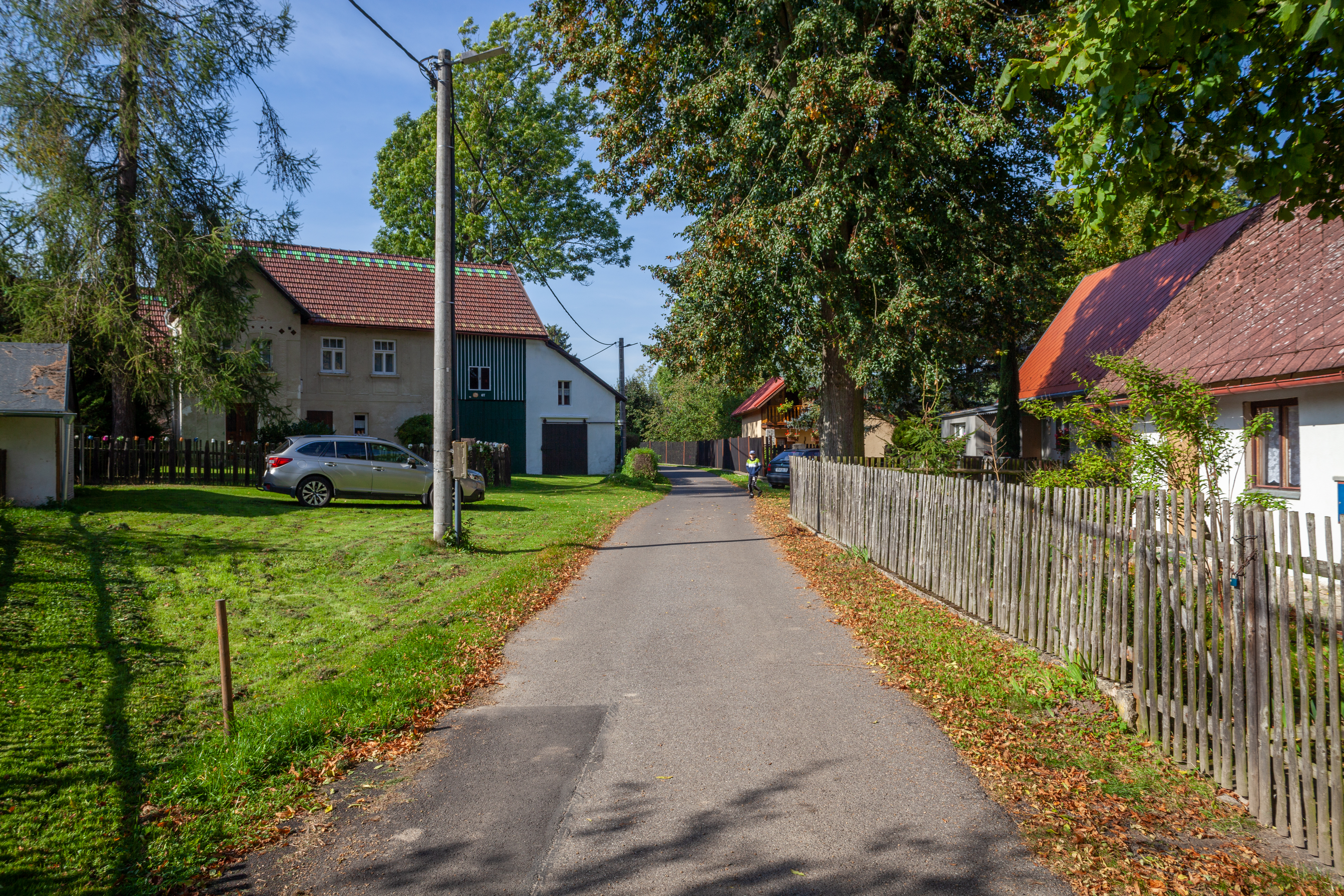
- Karlovka, a part of Velká Bukovina

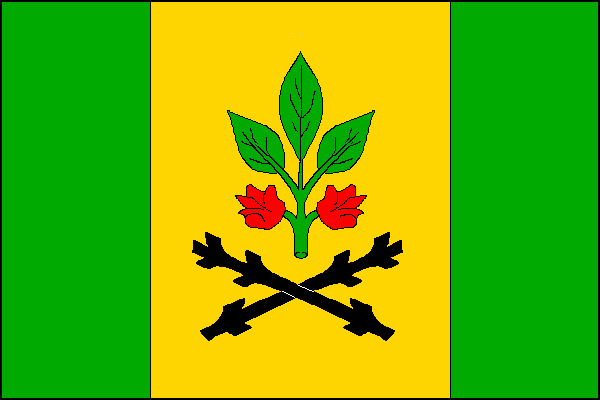
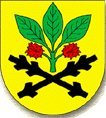
- Flag Coat of arms

- Location in the Czech Republic
- Coordinates: 50°43′50″N 14°23′49″E
- Country: Czech Republic
- Region: Ústí nad Labem
- District: Děčín
- First mentioned: 1454

Area
  - Total: 14.36 km^{2} (5.54 sq mi)
- Elevation: 313 m (1,027 ft)

Population (2026-01-01)
  - Total: 524
  - Density: 36.5/km^{2} (94.5/sq mi)
- Time zone: UTC+1 (CET)
  - Summer (DST): UTC+2 (CEST)
- Postal code: 407 29
- Website: www.velka-bukovina.cz

Velká Bukovina (German: Groß Bocken) is a municipality and village in Děčín District in the Ústí nad Labem Region of the Czech Republic. It has about 500 inhabitants.

== Administrative division ==
Velká Bukovina consists of three municipal parts (in brackets population according to the 2021 census):

- Velká Bukovina (272)
- Karlovka (64)
- Malá Bukovina (167)

== Etymology ==
The name Bukovina is derived from the Czech word buk, i.e. 'beech'. The prefix Velká ('great') distinguishes it from the neighbouring village Malá Bukovina ('small Bukovina').

== Geography ==
Velká Bukovina is located about 13 kilometres (8 mi) southeast of Děčín and 26 km (16 mi) east of Ústí nad Labem. It lies in the Central Bohemian Uplands. The fishpond Velký rybník is located in the eastern part of the municipal territory.

== History ==
Originally, this territory was colonised by the Lords of Klinštejn. The first written mention of Velká Bukovina is from 1454, when the village belonged to Jan of Vartenberk. The Vartenberks acquired the area in 1428, when Jindřich Berka of Dubá sold Žandov and Česká Kamenice to Zikmund of Vartenberk. In 1538, the Žandov estate was acquired by the brothers Přibík and Petr Týnský of Týn, who had built a fortress in Velká Bukovina and set up a separate estate. In 1732, Duchess Anna Maria Franziska of Saxe-Lauenburg bought Velká Bukovina and annexed it to the Zákupy estate.

== Demographics ==
Historical population

Year	Pop.	±%
1869	2,005	—
1880	1,953	−2.6%
1890	1,788	−8.4%
1900	1,707	−4.5%
1910	1,617	−5.3%

Year	Pop.	±%
1921	1,591	−1.6%
1930	1,570	−1.3%
1950	768	−51.1%
1961	693	−9.8%
1970	607	−12.4%

Year	Pop.	±%
1980	529	−12.9%
1991	415	−21.6%
2001	416	+0.2%
2011	475	+14.2%
2021	503	+5.9%

Source: Censuses

== Transport ==
There are no railways or major roads passing through the municipality.

== Sights ==
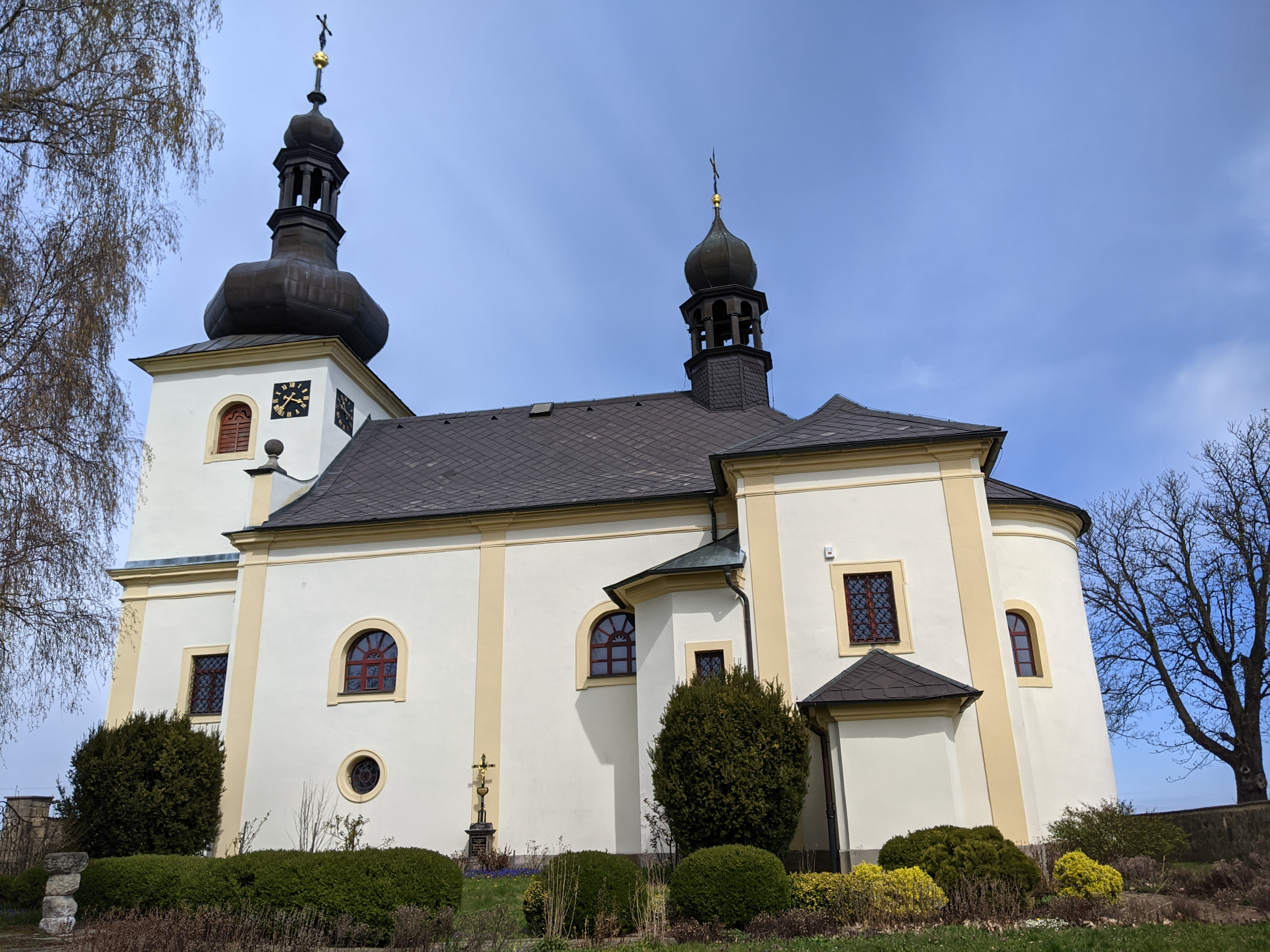
Church of Saint Wenceslaus

The main landmark of Velká Bukovina is the Church of Saint Wenceslaus. It was built in the Baroque style in 1716 on the site of an older church.

A cultural monument is also the former late Gothic fortress from 1536, rebuilt into an early Baroque manor house in 1656. After several modifications it lost the character of a manor house.
