= Stružnice =

- Municipality
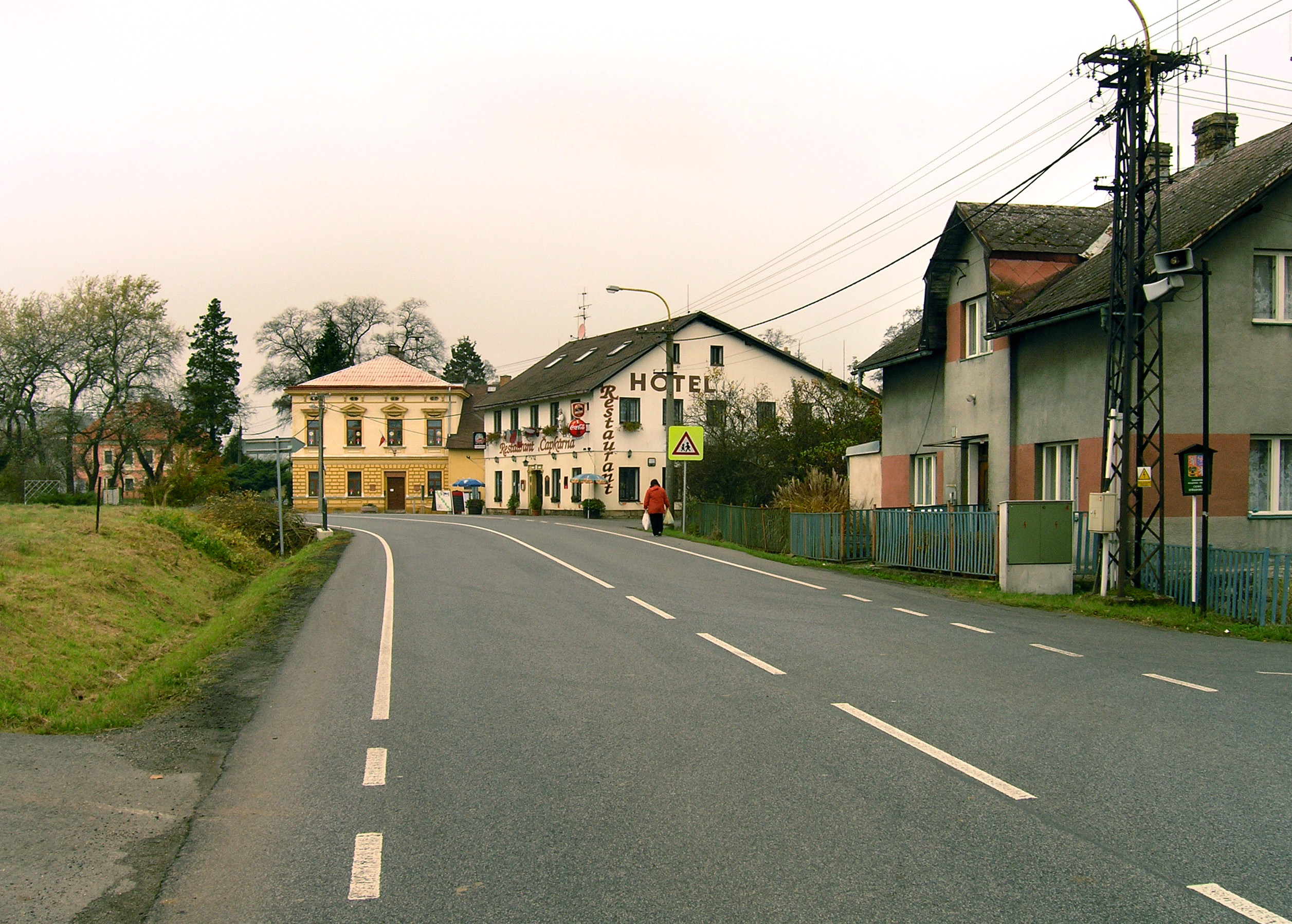
- Main street

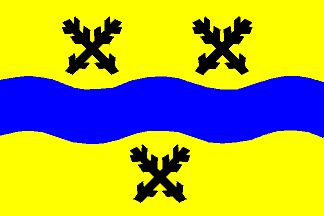
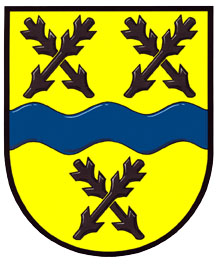
- Flag Coat of arms

- Location in the Czech Republic
- Coordinates: 50°41′49″N 14°27′0″E
- Country: Czech Republic
- Region: Liberec
- District: Česká Lípa
- First mentioned: 1281

Area
  - Total: 21.29 km^{2} (8.22 sq mi)
- Elevation: 238 m (781 ft)

Population (2026-01-01)
  - Total: 1,018
  - Density: 47.82/km^{2} (123.8/sq mi)
- Time zone: UTC+1 (CET)
  - Summer (DST): UTC+2 (CEST)
- Postal code: 471 08
- Website: www.obecstruznice.cz

Stružnice (German: Straußnitz) is a municipality and village in Česká Lípa District in the Liberec Region of the Czech Republic. It has about 1,000 inhabitants.

== Administrative division ==
Stružnice consists of four municipal parts (in brackets population according to the 2021 census):

- Stružnice (614)
- Bořetín (49)
- Jezvé (295)
- Stráž u České Lípy (7)

== Etymology ==
The name is derived from the Czech word strouha, i.e. 'brook'. It denoted a village located along a brook.

== Geography ==
Stružnice is located about 6 kilometres (4 mi) west of Česká Lípa and 41 km (25 mi) west of Liberec. It lies on the border between the Central Bohemian Uplands and Ralsko Uplands. The highest point is at 555 m (1,821 ft) above sea level. The Ploučnice River flows through the municipality. Most of the municipal territory lies within the České středohoří Protected Landscape Area.

== History ==
The first written mention of Stružnice is from 1281, when it belonged to Záviš of Stružnice. His family, later known as Lords of Klinštejn, owned Stružnice until 1403, when they sold it to the Berka of Dubá family. Then the owners often changed. In 1629, Stružnice was bought by Vilém Wratislaw of Mitrovice, Grand Prior of Knights Hospitaller. He annexed it to the Horní Libchava estate and tried to transfer the property to the Wratislaw of Mitrovice family, but it remained in the possession of the Knights Hospitaller order until the first half of the 20th century.

== Demographics ==
Historical population

Year	Pop.	±%
1869	1,868	—
1880	1,915	+2.5%
1890	1,787	−6.7%
1900	1,746	−2.3%
1910	1,717	−1.7%

Year	Pop.	±%
1921	1,744	+1.6%
1930	1,827	+4.8%
1950	1,018	−44.3%
1961	1,072	+5.3%
1970	1,062	−0.9%

Year	Pop.	±%
1980	861	−18.9%
1991	784	−8.9%
2001	839	+7.0%
2011	930	+10.8%
2021	965	+3.8%

Source: Censuses

== Transport ==
Stružnice is located on the railway line Liberec–Děčín.

== Sights ==
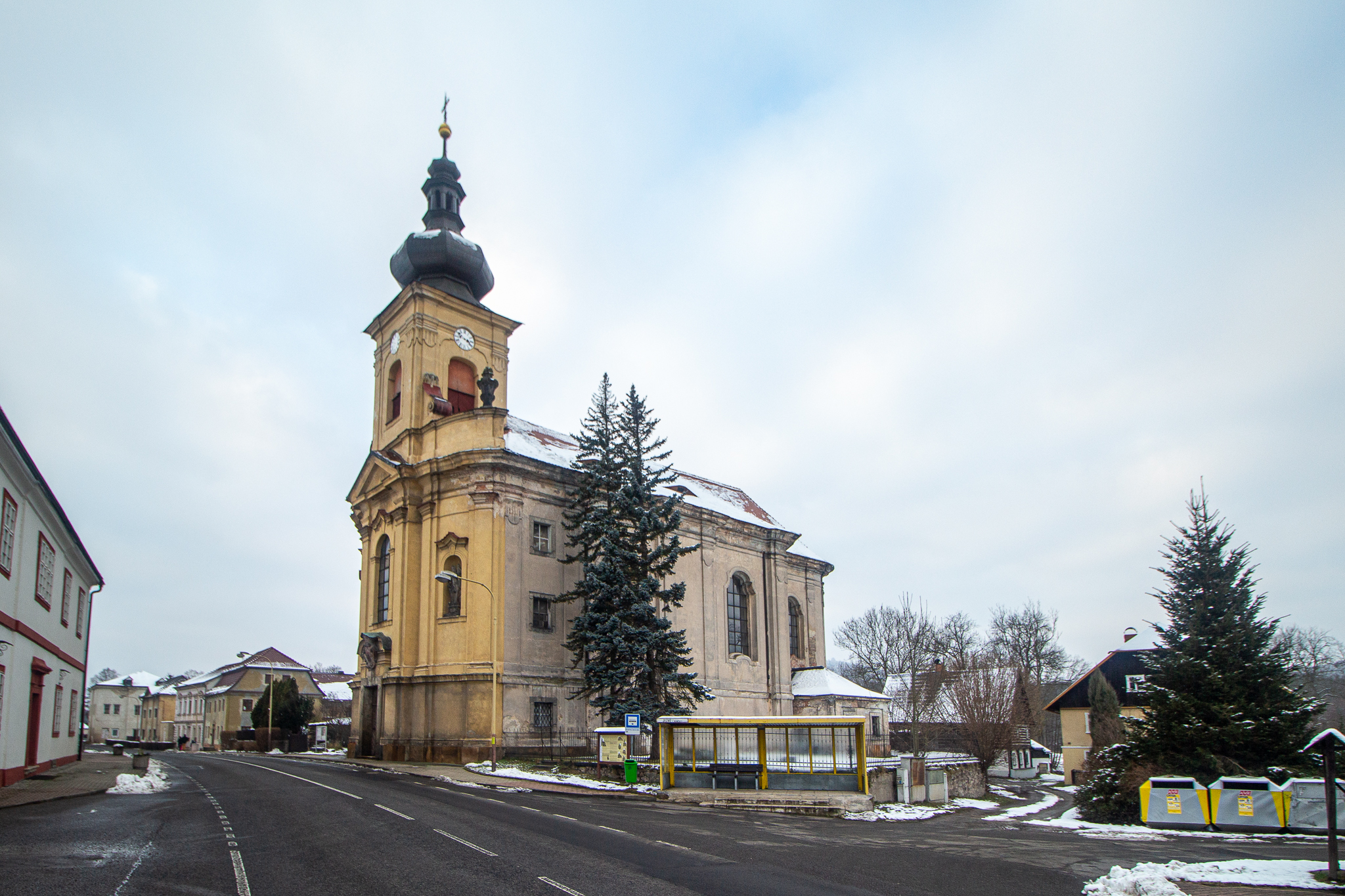
Church of Saint Lawrence

The most important monument is the Church of Saint Lawrence, located in Jezvé. It was built in the Baroque style in 1746–1756 on the site of and old medieval church. It was reconstructed after a fire in 1798.
