= Lords of Klinštejn =

Lords of Klinštejn Páni z Klinštejna
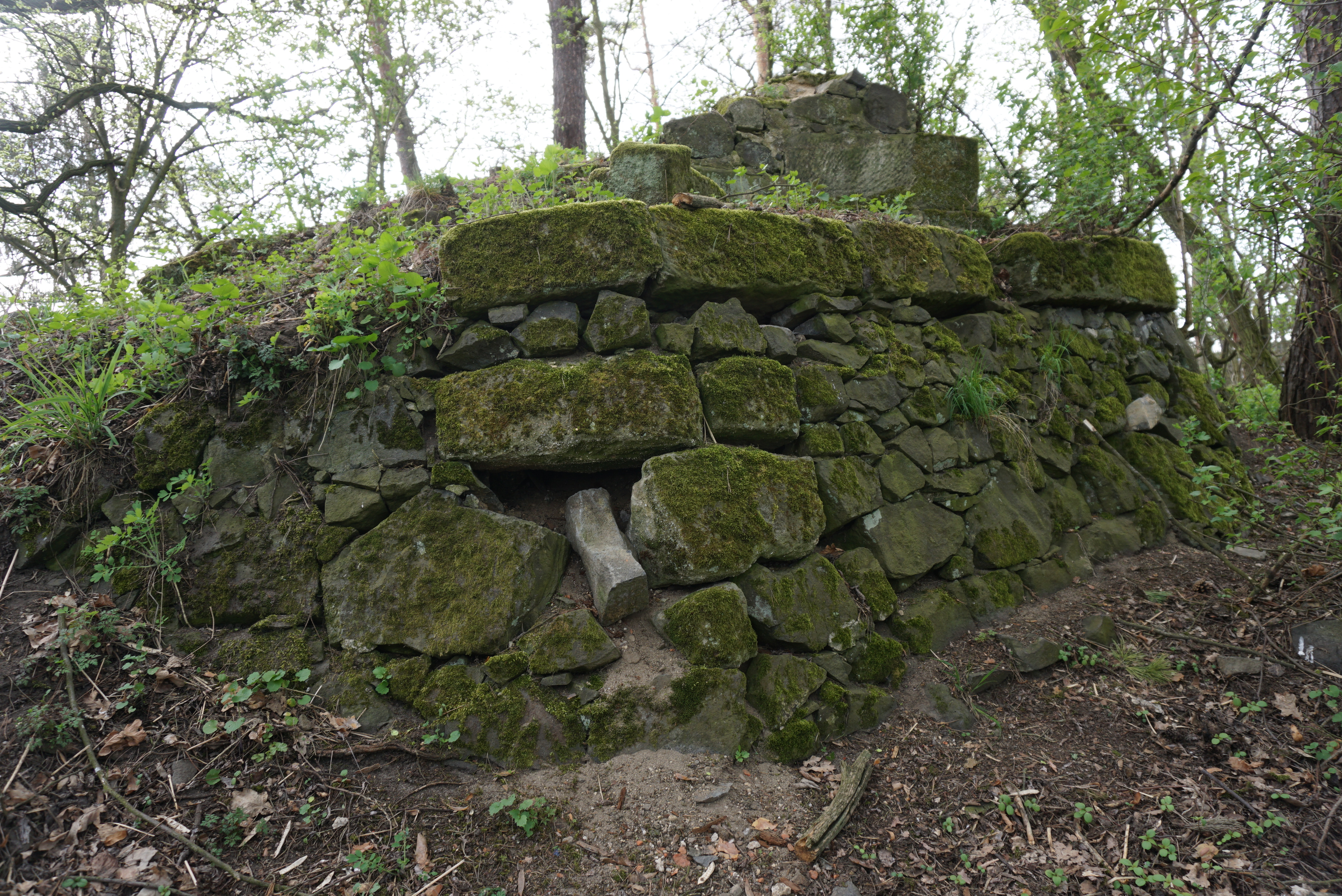
- Ruins of Klinštejn castle
- Parent family: Ronovci
- Origin: Česká Lípa region, Bohemia
- Founded: 13th century
- Founder: Častolov of Zittau
- Titles: Imperial Counts
- Estates: Rožmberk Castle, Ronov Castle
- Dissolution: 1663

The Lords of Klinštejn were a Bohemian noble family from Česká Lípa region. They originated from the Ronovci family. They are known from the period of the 13th to the 17th century. The Klinštejn family became involved in the dispute between the Bohemian king John of Bohemia and the Czech nobility after the imprisonment of the nobleman Henry of Lipá in 1315. The family died out by the sword.

== Origin of the family ==
Judging by the coat of arms (a black island in a golden field), the lords of Klinštejn came from the ancient family of the Ronovci. The coat of arms was also used by other noble families from northern Bohemia, the lords of Dubé, Lipé, and Lichtemburg.

Smil, called Světlický, left behind three descendants: a daughter, Scholastika, a nun in the Doksany monastery, an older son, Častolov, and a younger, Jindřich, who held the office of royal burgrave in Budyšín in 1232–1237. From the 1340s, a new generation of Ronovci appeared at the royal court. Častolov of Zittau left behind descendants: Hynk (also Jindřich) of Zittau, Častolov the Younger of Zittau and Chvala of Zittau. A descendant of Častolov the Younger was Záviš from Stružnice (1281–1291), the forefather of the lords of Klinštejn. In his possession there were estates on the right bank of the Ploučnice, further between Žandov and Stružnice, Volfartice and Dolní Libchava.

In 1281, Záviš from Stružnice had to pay fines from the legacy of the father of the order of the Teutonic Knights for the damage caused to their property. He paid the fine in the amount of 9 hryvnias from the annual income from the village of Volfartice. At the end of the 13th century, he built the wooden Klinštejn Castle near the town and castle Lipý (today's Česká Lípa). In 1291, Záviš was referred to as the burgrave of Houska, and at that time he renounced his paternal rights over the villages of the Doksan Monastery - the records include Horní and Dolní Police, Stoupná, Bělá and Grundis. At the beginning of the 14th century, Záviš or his descendants held Žandov, Skalice, Horní and Dolní Libchav, Častolovice in their possession outside of Klinštejna, Radeč and maybe others. Záviš had issue:

- Protiva of Žandov (1341), held Žandov
- Bohuněk of Klinštejn (1341–1363), held Žandov, Klinštejn, Skalice, Volfartice
- Půta of Klinštejn and Žandov (1339–1343), held Žandov, Klinštejn, Vinařice
- Záviš of Klinštejn (1363–1372), held Skalice, Libchava (Horní and Dolní)
- Čenek of Žandov (1341–1364), held Žandov
- Vilém of Žandov (1341) mentioned in Žandov
- Hynek of Žandov (1341–1370), sat in Žandov

On 9 May 1343, the brothers Bohuněk (Bohunko) and Půta (Potho) from Klinštejn (von Klingstein) presented the priest John (Johannes) for the deceased parish priest in Žandov. Two years before that, on 11 February 1341, the brothers from Žandov Půta, Čeněk (Czenko), Vilém (Wilhelm), Hynek (Hinko) and Protiva made a donation for the salvation of their deceased parents to the church in Žandov in their village Radči. Bohuněk of Klinštejn testified to the brothers.

On 23 May 1362, Bohuněk, the knight from Klinštejn (Bohunko, Ritter von Klingstein) appointed Mikuláš (Nikolaus), who had previously worked in Zwickau, as parish priest in Skalice (Langenau). He was installed by the dean's office in Lípa. Parish priest Mikuláš did not work in Skalice for even a year, as already on 7 January 1363, the knight Bohuněk presented priest Jakub from Laun (Jakobus) to the church in Skalice, and on the same day, for the translated Jakub in Volfartice (Wolfersdorf), priest Walther of Lípa (Walther von Leipa).

== Záviš from Klinštejn and his brothers ==
Soon after Bohuňek's death on 2 December 1363, Záviš from Klinštejn (Zawistonis de Clynngenstein, also Sawisto) and his brothers installed priest Jakub (Jakob) in Horní Libchavy for the deceased pastor Jan (Johann).

Two years later (31 May 1372), the brothers from Klinštejn introduced Hynek, Jindřich (Heinrich), Bušek, Zdeněk, Henzlín, Frydman (Fridmann) and Půta from Žandov (for the orphans of their brother Závis from Klinštejn) to the Church of St. James the Great in Horní Libchava for the deceased priest Jan (Johann), son of Herbard from Lípa. On 8 August 1372, the same noble gentlemen from Klinštejn and for the orphans Půta of Žandov appointed priest Jindřich from Vzdoun (? Heinrich von Nabden). Záviš from Klinštejn had issue:

- Hynek of Klinštejn (1372–1378), held Skalice, Volfartice, Libchava
- Jindřich of Klinštejn (1372–1377), held Skalice, Libchava
- Bušek from Klinštejn (1372–1377), held Skalice, Libchava
- Čenek of Klinštejn (1372–1388), held Skalice, Volfartice, Libchava
- Henzlín of Klinštejn (1372–1383), held Skalice, Volfartice, Libchava
- Frydman of Klinštejn (1372–1380), held Skalice, Volfartice, Libchava
- Půta of Žandov (1363–1378), held Skalice, Volfartice, Libchava

== Descendants ==
In the 15th century, the family split into three ancestral branches.

=== Kokořínský ===
The Kokořín branch soon died out, in the same century. It is mentioned near Kokořín Castle.

=== Škvorecký ===
An important representative of the family was Čeněk of Klinštejn, who was burgrave of Prague Castle and, between 1463 and 1480, royal prosecutor (a new position at the time). His job was to collect the king's debts from his debtors. He died in 1480.

=== Míčan ===
Descendants from Jindřich of Klinštejn. In the records of that time, the family was also listed as Míčan of Klinštejn and Roztoky (German: Mičan von Klinstein und Rostok, Czech: Míčanové z Klinštejna a z Roztok). In the second half of the 15th century, the family owned small estates in northern Bohemia. Their representative was Jindřich from Sulislavice and Roztoky. His descendants acquired Vinařice, Toužetín and Žerotín. This branch (and thus the Klinštejn family in general) died out with the death of Ignác Vojtěch in 1663 in Prague.
