= Vlhošť =

Mountain in the Czech Republic

- IUCN category IV (habitat/species management area)
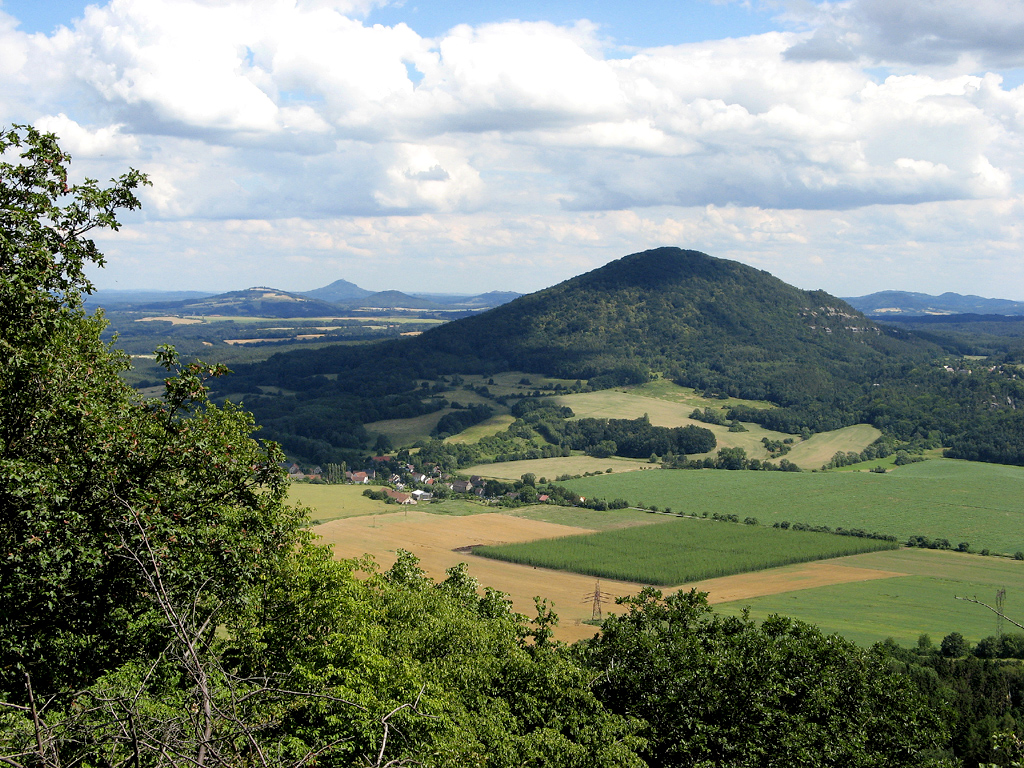
- View from the northwest

- Location within Czech Republic
- Location: Blíževedly, Liberec Region, Czech Republic
- Coordinates: 50°36′9″N 14°27′15″E
- Area: 82.23 ha (203.2 acres)
- Max. elevation: 614 m (2,014 ft)
- Min. elevation: 360 m (1,180 ft)
- Established: 2 February 1998
- Operator: AOPK ČR
- Administrator: Administration of the Kokořínsko – Máchův kraj PLA

Vlhošť (German: Wilschtberg) is a mountain and nature reserve in the Ralsko Uplands in the Liberec Region of the Czech Republic. It has an elevation of 614 m (2,014 ft).

== Location ==
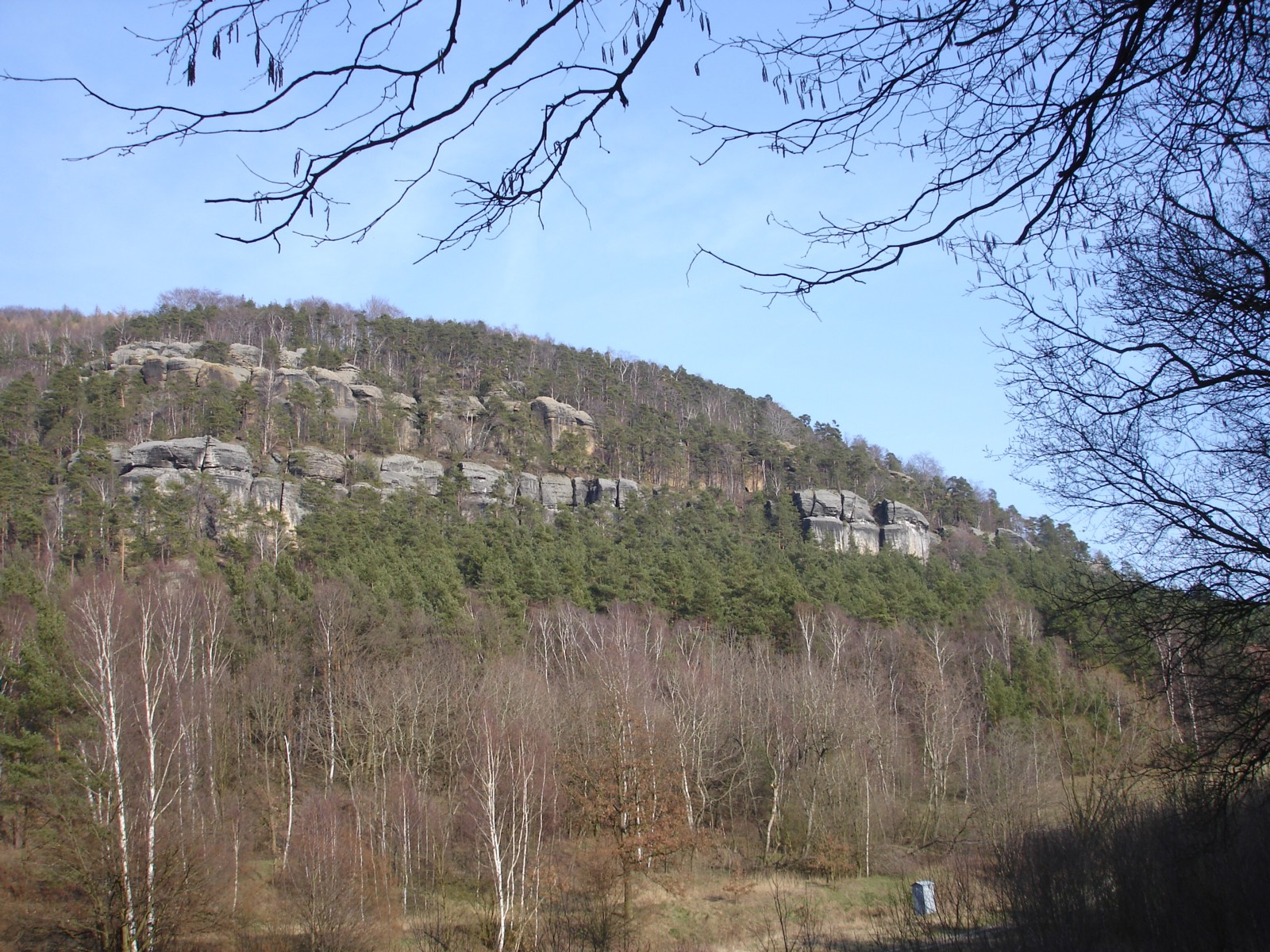
Rock terraces

The mountain is located in the municipal territory of Blíževedly, about 10 kilometres (6 mi) southwest of Česká Lípa. The nature reserve includes also the hill of Malý Vlhošť south of Vlhošť, in the territory od Dubá. It lies in the Kokořínsko – Máchův kraj Protected Landscape Area and is the highest point of this protected area.

== Geology ==
The area is formed by sandstone from which Tertiary volcanic peaks rise.

== Nature ==
The nature reserve was established on 2 February 1998 on an area of 82.23 ha (203.2 acres). The main reason for protection are forest communities of ravine beech forests and relict pine forests. Many protected molluscs and spiders live here, and the protected stock dove and boreal owl nest here. The area has also been home to peregrine falcons. Among the rare plants, the scaly male fern and chickweed-wintergreen grow in the beech forests.
