= Volfartice =

- Municipality
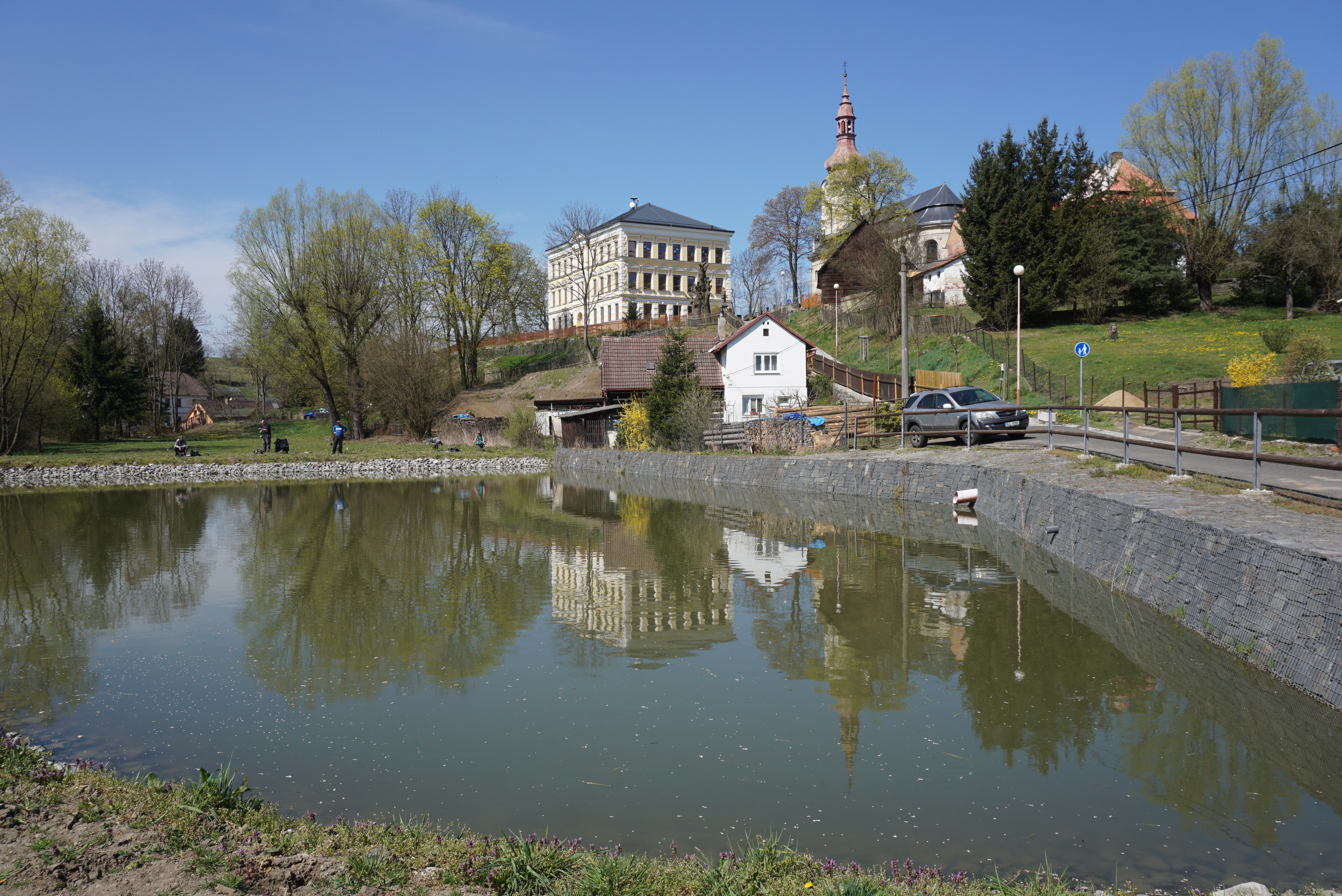
- View towards the church and primary school

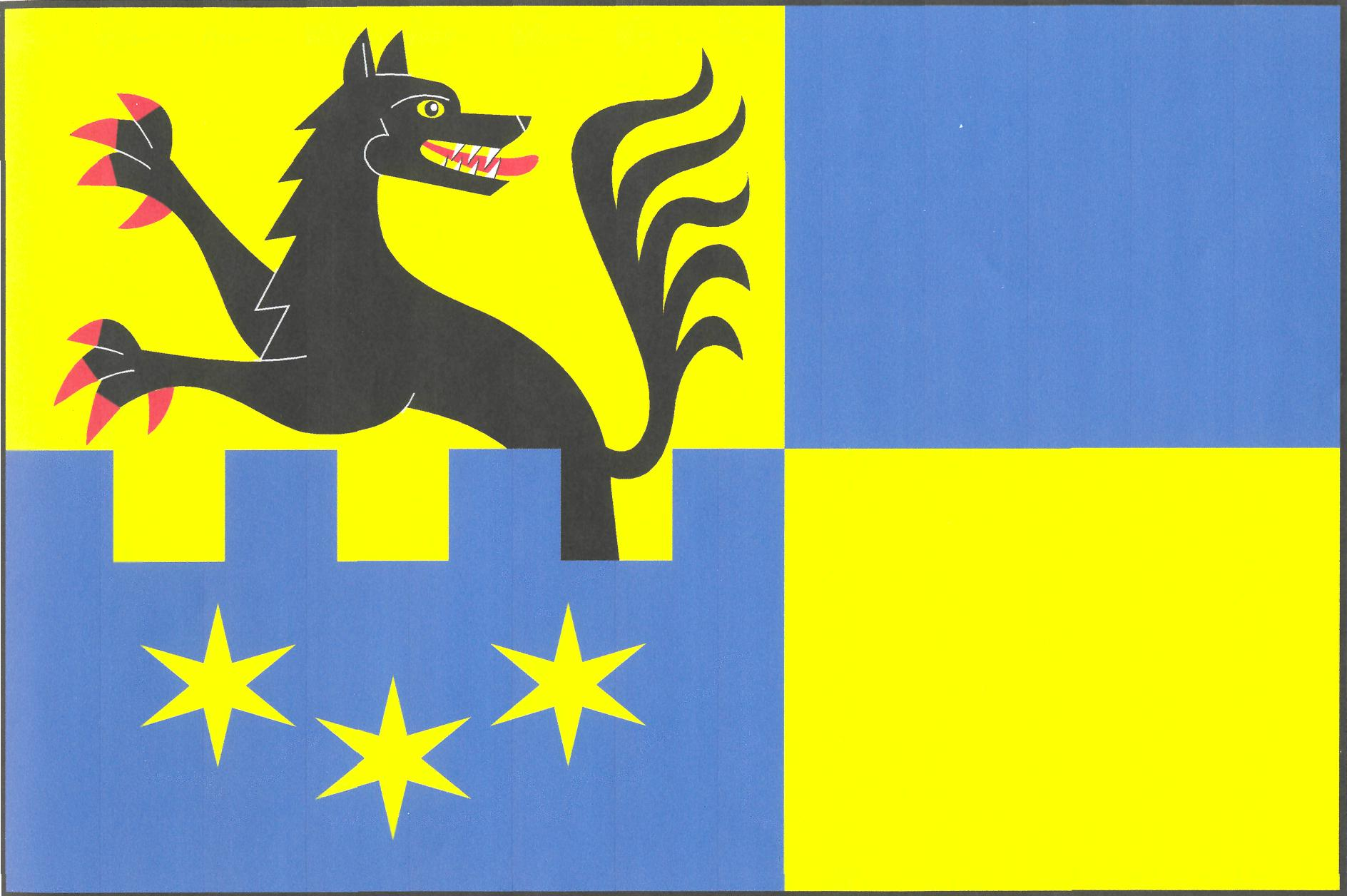
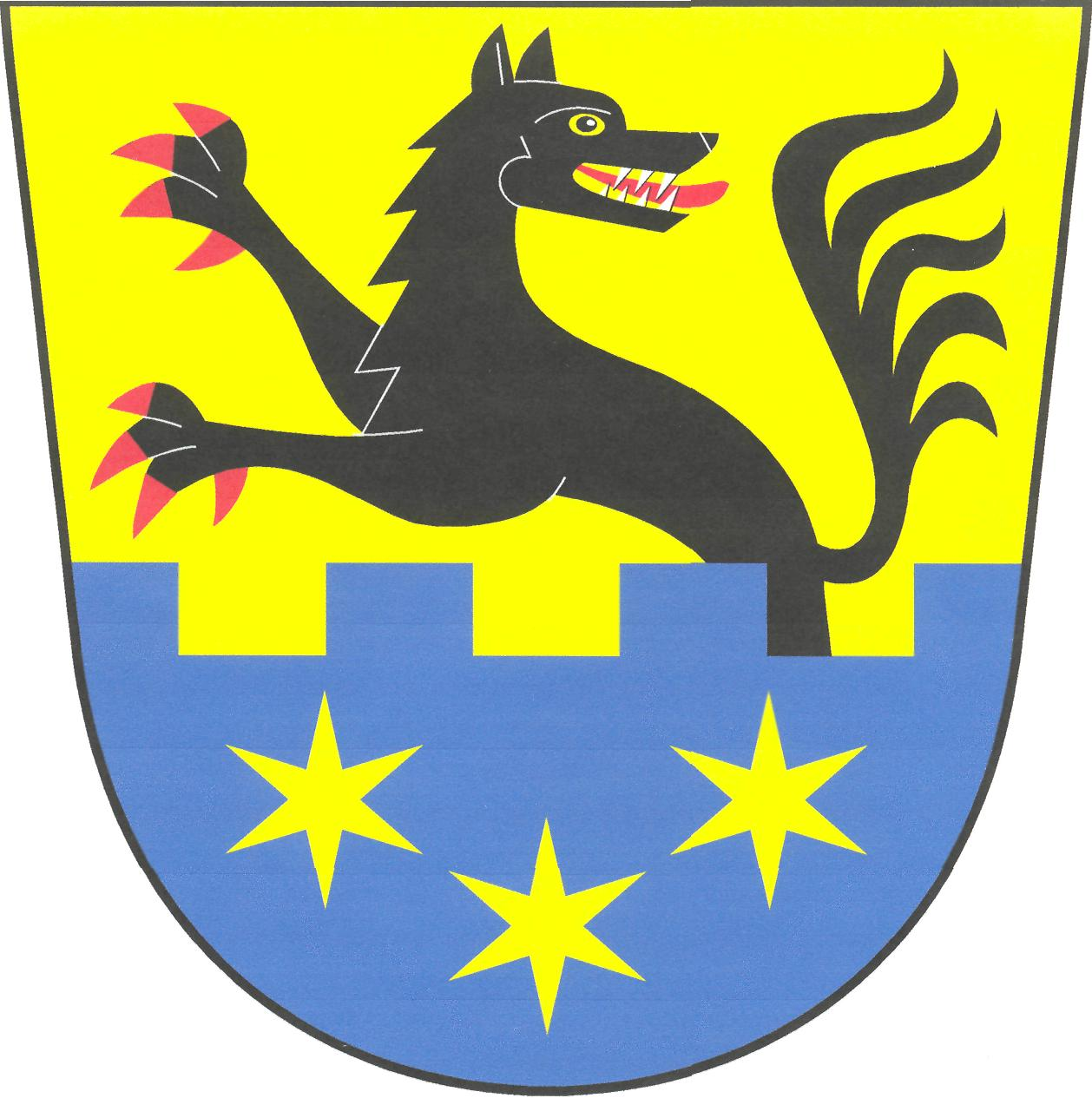
- Flag Coat of arms

- Location in the Czech Republic
- Coordinates: 50°43′49″N 14°27′11″E
- Country: Czech Republic
- Region: Liberec
- District: Česká Lípa
- First mentioned: 1281

Area
  - Total: 13.09 km^{2} (5.05 sq mi)
- Elevation: 323 m (1,060 ft)

Population (2026-01-01)
  - Total: 736
  - Density: 56.2/km^{2} (146/sq mi)
- Time zone: UTC+1 (CET)
  - Summer (DST): UTC+2 (CEST)
- Postal code: 471 12
- Website: www.volfartice.cz

Volfartice (German: Wolfersdorf) is a municipality and village in Česká Lípa District in the Liberec Region of the Czech Republic. It has about 700 inhabitants.

== Administrative division ==
Volfartice consists of two municipal parts (in brackets population according to the 2021 census):

- Volfartice (652)
- Nová Ves (54)

== Etymology ==
The name Volfartice is derived from the personal name Wolfart (Volfart), meaning "Wolfart's village".

== Geography ==
Volfartice is located about 7 kilometres (4 mi) northwest of Česká Lípa and 41 km (25 mi) west of Liberec. It lies in the Central Bohemian Uplands. The highest point is the hill Poustevna at 520 m (1,706 ft) above sea level. The built-up area is situated in the valley of the Libchava Stream. The entire municipal territory lies within the České středohoří Protected Landscape Area.

== History ==
The first written mention of Volfartice is from 1281. At that time it was called Vluardesdorf and belonged to Záviš of Stružnice. The village was probably founded after 1261. The church existed here in 1352 at the latest. Volfartice was gradually divided into two parts with different owners. From the 17th century, the lower part belonged to the Horní Libchava estate owned by the order of Knights Hospitaller. The upper part was property of various lesser noblemen. In 1850, the two parts were merged and the independent municipality was established.

The village of Nová Ves was first documented in 1623.

== Demographics ==
Historical population

Year	Pop.	±%
1869	2,448	—
1880	2,305	−5.8%
1890	2,127	−7.7%
1900	2,024	−4.8%
1910	1,879	−7.2%

Year	Pop.	±%
1921	1,579	−16.0%
1930	1,569	−0.6%
1950	890	−43.3%
1961	953	+7.1%
1970	882	−7.5%

Year	Pop.	±%
1980	669	−24.1%
1991	509	−23.9%
2001	595	+16.9%
2011	665	+11.8%
2021	706	+6.2%

Source: Censuses

== Transport ==
There are no railways or major roads passing through the municipality.

== Sights ==
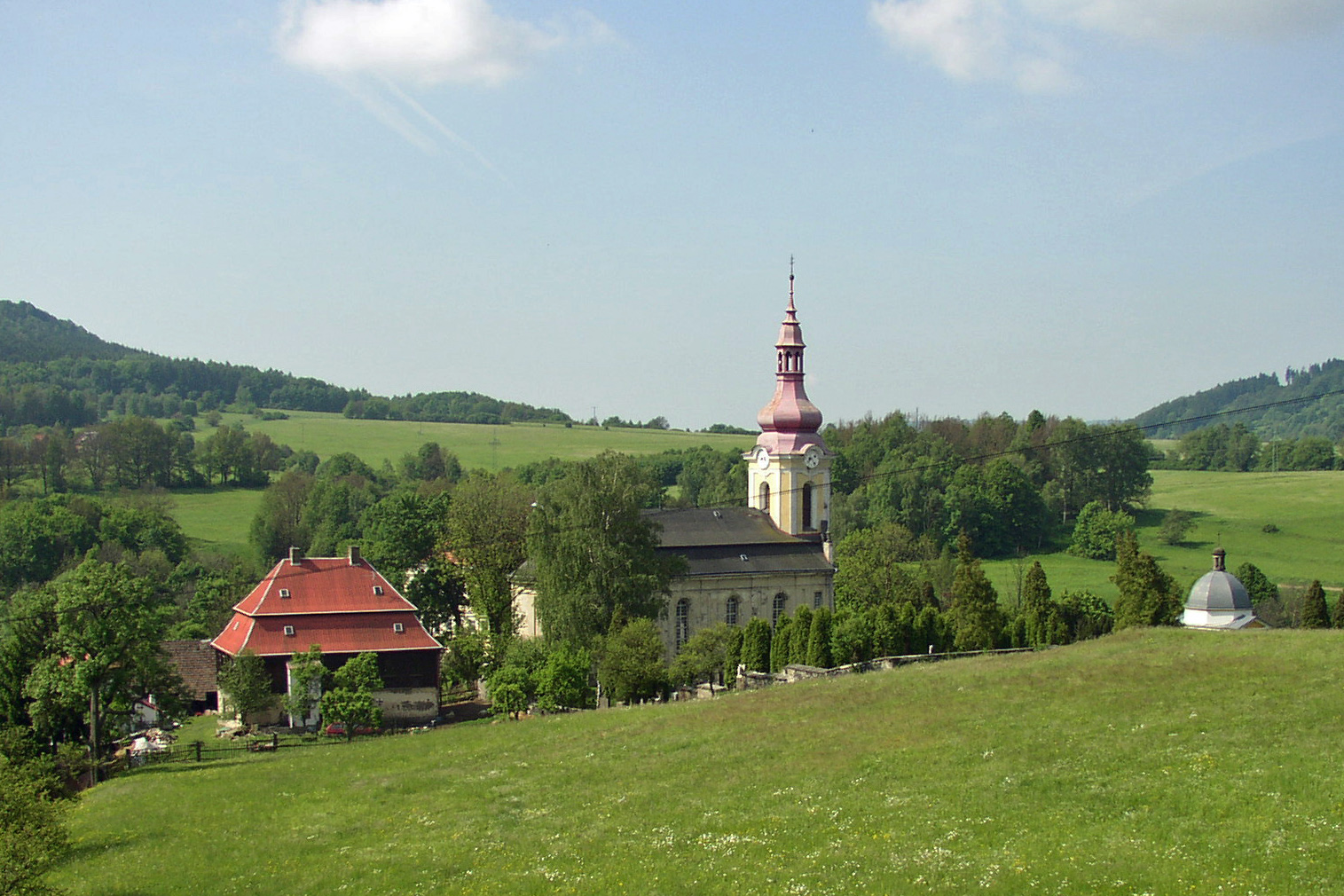
Church of Saints Peter and Paul

The most important monument is the Church of Saints Peter and Paul. The original medieval church was rebuilt in the Rococo style in 1785–1795. The tower was built in 1778–1780.

There were two fortresses in Volfartice, but only the so-called Horní tvrz ('upper fortress') survived. It was a late Gothic building from the end of the 14th century, rebuilt in the Renaissance style in the 16th century. Today it serves as a recreational facility.
