= Lichnice Castle =

Castle ruins in Třemošnice, Czechia

Lichnice Castle Castle Lichtenburg, Burg Lichnice, Burg Lichtemburk
- Podhradí, near Třemošnice
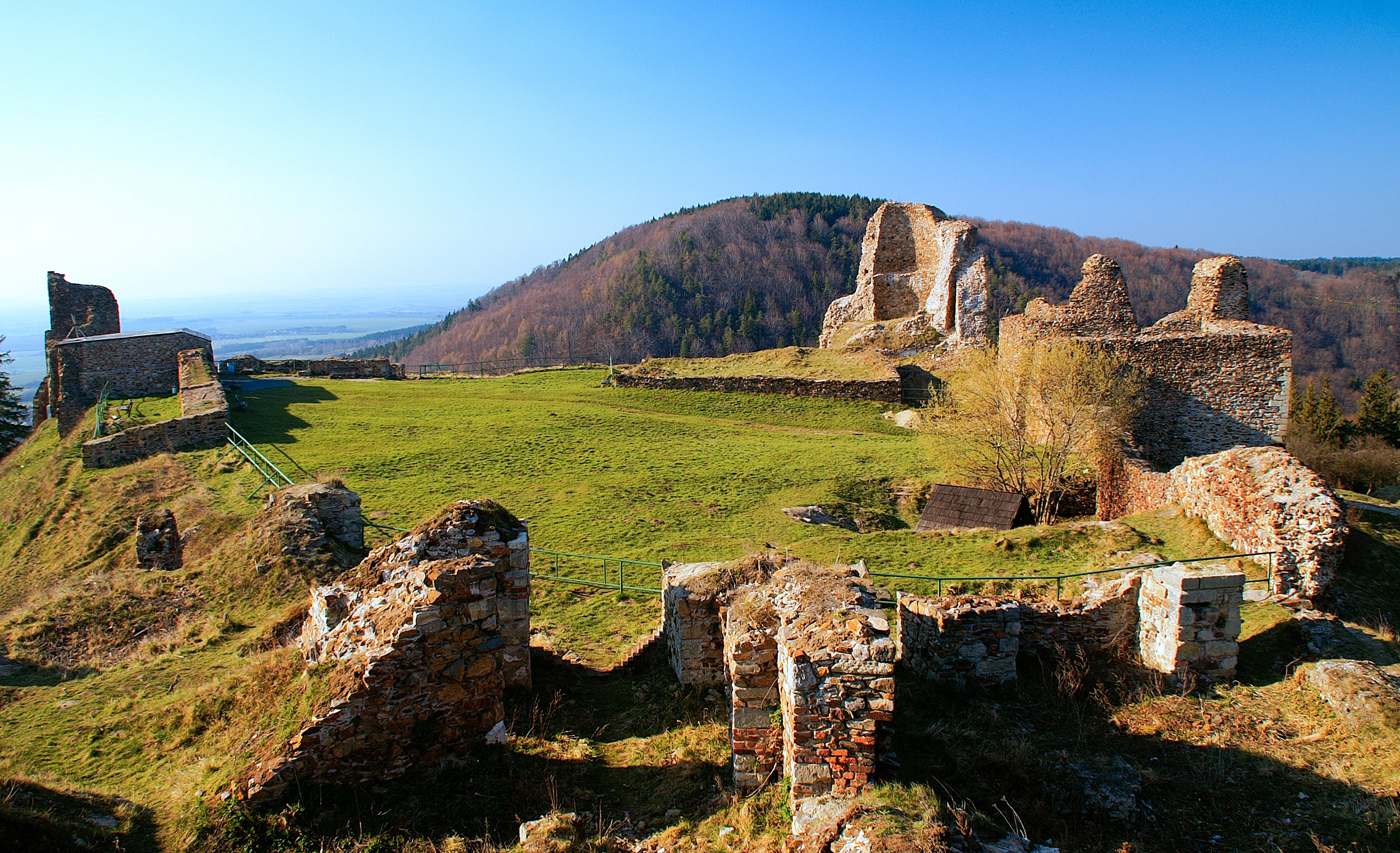
- Ruins of Lichnice Castle

Site information
- Type: Castle
- Condition: ruins

Location
- Lichnice Castle shown within the Czech Republic
- Location within Czech Republic
- Coordinates: 49.879105°N 15.586251°E

Site history
- Built: first half of the 13th century

The ruins of Lichnice Castle (also: Lichtenburk Castle) are on the edge of the Iron Mountains, near the Czech village of Podhradí, in the municipality of Třemošnice, about 15 kilometres (9 mi) east of Čáslav.

== History ==
The castle was probably constructed as a royal base in the first half of the 13th century. It was first mentioned in 1261, when it was in possession of Smil of Ronow, who called himself "Smil of Lichtenburg" and thereby created the "von Lichtenburg" family.

The castle had a triangular floor plan with two residential towers. In the 14th century, alterations were made, and it was reacquired by the Bohemian Crown in 1410. It was conquered in 1421, during the Hussite Wars, and besieged unsuccessfully in 1428.

In 1490, the castle and estate of Lichtenburg were acquired by the Trčka of Lípa family, who rebuilt the castle in a late Gothic style.

The edifice lost its importance at the end of the 16th century, and the fortifications were dismantled. By 1700, it was already described as a ruin.
