= Ronov family =

Bohemian noble family

Ronovci (Lords of Lipá)
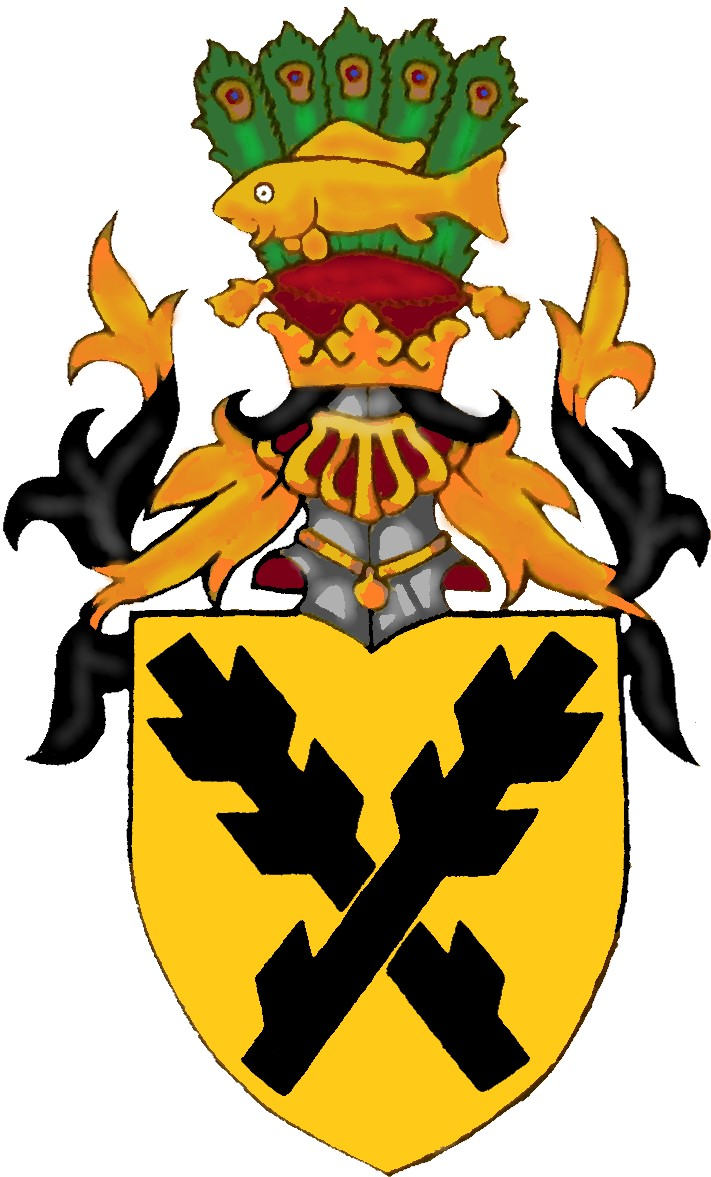
- Ronovci coat of arms
- Parent family: Lords of Klinštejn, Lords of Dubá, Berka, Lichtenburg, Křinečtí of Ronov
- Origin: Bohemia
- Founded: 12th century
- Founder: Smil of Tuhaň
- Connected members: Henry of Lipá
- Estates: Castle of Bautzen, Ronov Castle, Ojvín Castle

The Ronov family or Ronows (Czech: Ronovci, also Hronovci or Ronovici; German: von Ronow or von Ronburg) were one of the oldest and most important Bohemian noble families in mediaeval era. Their power base was situated primarily in northern Bohemia proper (especially around the town Česká Lípa), extending into the territory of historical Upper Lusatia (present-day southeastern Germany and soutwestern Poland). Early mentions about ancestors of the family date from the end of the 12th century. Over time, the family grew into many branches, e.g. lords of Dubá, Berka of Dubá, Lichtenburk, Křinecký of Ronov, etc.

== Origins ==
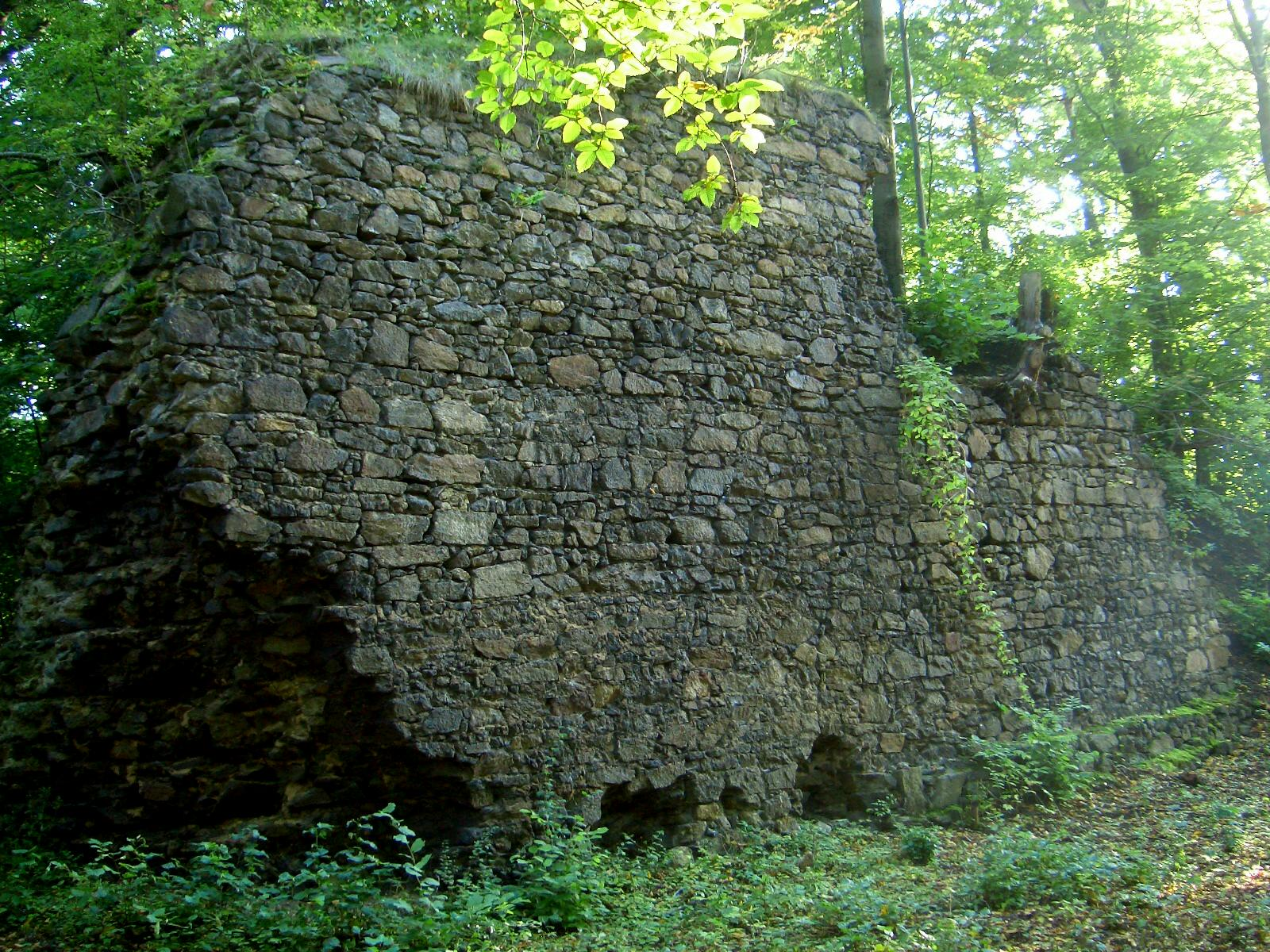
Remnants of the Ronov (Rohnau) Castle in present Poland – ancient eponymous seat of Ronows was founded before 1253

Family name most probably came after its seat in northern Bohemian borderlands: castle Ronov (German: Rohnau) in the Zittau region, located in the Lusatian Neisse valley – a place after 1945 situated on the southwestern edge of Poland (the settlement of Trzciniec, part of the town Bogatynia). Later Ronows founded other castles with the same name: Ronov Castle near Česká Lípa (probably most known family manor, although built almost 150 years later), also Ronov upon Sázava Castle near Přibyslav or Ronov Castle near Adamov.

However, the family’s earliest documented ancestors did not reside so far to the north. The first ancestor mentioned in written records (in 1192) was lord Smil Světlík of Tuhaň whose estates were located in central Bohemia. In 1210, in recognition of his loyal service to King Přemysl Otakar I, Smil was appointed to the office of castellanus of the Kladsko Region. At the beginning of the 13th century, Smil probably held village Vojnice near (later founded) town Libochovice. He and his sons Jindřich and Častolov are mentioned in the years 1200–1227 as owners of various settlements in the northern part of central Bohemia, e.g. Lovosice, Klapý, Libochovice. Smil died sometime around 1216.

Častolov was listed as the son of Smil for the first time in 1216, while 10 years later he is listed as royal Highest Huntsman (Czech: nejvyšší lovčí). Jindřich, the second and younger of the sons, was mentioned for the first time (along with his brother) in 1219 as a witness to a document of Ottokar I of Bohemia for the Plasy Monastery. In 1232, he became a castellan at the royal castle of Bautzen, where he remained until 1237. Together with his brother Častolov and with the help of the Bohemian king Wenceslaus I, they acquired the territory of Zittau and after 1238 are mentioned in documents with the surname de Sitavia ("of Zittau"). The brothers managed to acquire a large piece of territory stretching from Pirna to the foothills of the Lusatian Mountains up to Česká Lípa, which became the family's power base.

== Rise to power ==
In the period from 1248 to 1249, there was an uprising of Ottokar II of Bohemia against his father, king Wenceslaus I. For personal assistance to the king during his campaign to Prague in August 1249, the two Ronows acquired other estates after helping to suppress the rebellion, e.g. Lichtenburk (Lichnice) castle in eastern Bohemia.

Jindřich's son Smil obtained the post of burgrave in Prague, and continued to use the surname de Sitavia. Shortly after 1240, he married Alžběta of Křižanov, sister of Saint Zdislava. After 1251, he used three surnames: of Zittau, of Lichtenburk and of Ronov, which he also acquired. The Ronov family (Jindřich and son Smil †1269) was exposed more in eastern than northern Bohemia after 1250, thus they are subsequently named as Lichtenburks.

Jindřich's brother Častolov of Zittau also started a family. He had sons Jindřich (ancestor of the Berkas from Dubé), Častolov (younger, founder of the Klinštejn family) and the youngest Chval (built Ojvín Castle, ancestor of the Lipá family). With them and the court of the new king Přemysl Otakar II he lived in Jablonné v Podještědí in 1250. All of them are mentioned in connection with Zittau in documents from 1249 to 1263. Elder Častolov of Zittau died shortly after 1253 and the property was gradually divided.

Under the pressure of King Ottokar II of Bohemia, all three sons left the Zittau region after 1263. It wasn't until 40 years later that a descendant of the Ronov family, the rich feudal lord Henry of Lipá, returned here for a few years.

== Next generation ==
There were more Častolovs, Smils, Jindřichs and Čeňks among the older Ronovcis and they used different surnames according to the estates they acquired. Častolov Jr. was often mentioned in documents as Čeněk, Čeněk of Zittau. Hynek is also referred to as Jindřich through the Latin transcription of the name. There are few surviving documents from that time, and it is difficult to distinguish which of the persons took part in the event, and researchers differ in their opinions.

Chval, the youngest mentioned, together with his son Čeněk, built the Lipý Castle in Česká Lípa in the period 1268–1278. In 1257, Čeněk took part in the military campaign of the royal army of Ottokar II of Bohemia to Bavaria and distinguished himself at the Battle of Mühldorf. In the documents, Čeněk was also listed as Častolov from Frýdlant or from Ronov (Rohnau).

== Lineage ==
During the 13th and 14th centuries, the Ronovci split into many separate lineages:

- Lichtenburk
  - Krušina of Lichtenburk
  - Žlebský of Lichtenburk
  - Pykna of Lichtenburk
  - Bítovský of Lichtenburk
- Lords of Klinštejn
- Lords of Lipá
  - Lords of Pirkštejn
- Lords of Dubá
  - Berka of Dubá
  - Škopek of Dubá
  - Adršpach of Dubá
  - Červenohorský of Dubá
- Lords of Ronov and Přibyslav
- Křineský of Ronov

== Coat of arms ==
The common sign of all families deriving their origin from the Ronovci was crossed branches, most often black in a golden shield. The name of the family is also derived from branches (German ronne), so it is a so-called canting arms (on a phonetic basis). The individual families' coat of arms differed: the Lichtenburks and the lords of Lipá had a carp, the lords of Dubá wings with branches and other lines of their own sign. A number of legends were linked to their origin and coat of arms. According to one of them, the ancestor of the family named Hron was once caught and tied to a felled tree, according to another legend, they are descendants of the hunter Hovora, who saved Duke Jaromír, when the people of Vršov tied him to cut branches and tortured him. A member of the family is said to have won a carp in a coat of arms from Emperor Frederick Barbarossa for prowess in a tournament.

== Sources ==
- Sovadina, Miloslav. "Jindřich z Lipé. I. První muž království. Část 1". Časopis Matice moravské: 5–36. ISSN 0323-052X.
- Sovadina, Miloslav (2002). "Jindřich z Lipé. I. První muž království. Část 2". Časopis Matice moravské: 3–32. ISSN 0323-052X.
- Sovadina, Miloslav (2003). "Jindřich z Lipé II. Dominium nostrum atque bona nostra". Časopis Matice moravské: 21–59. ISSN 0323-052X.
- Urban, Jan (2003). Lichtenburkové. Vzestupy a pády jednoho panského rodu. Prague: Nakladatelství Lidové noviny. ISBN 80-7106-579-X.
