= Berštejn Castle =

16th-century Czech castle located in Doksy

Coordinates: 50°32′54.8″N 14°32′42″E

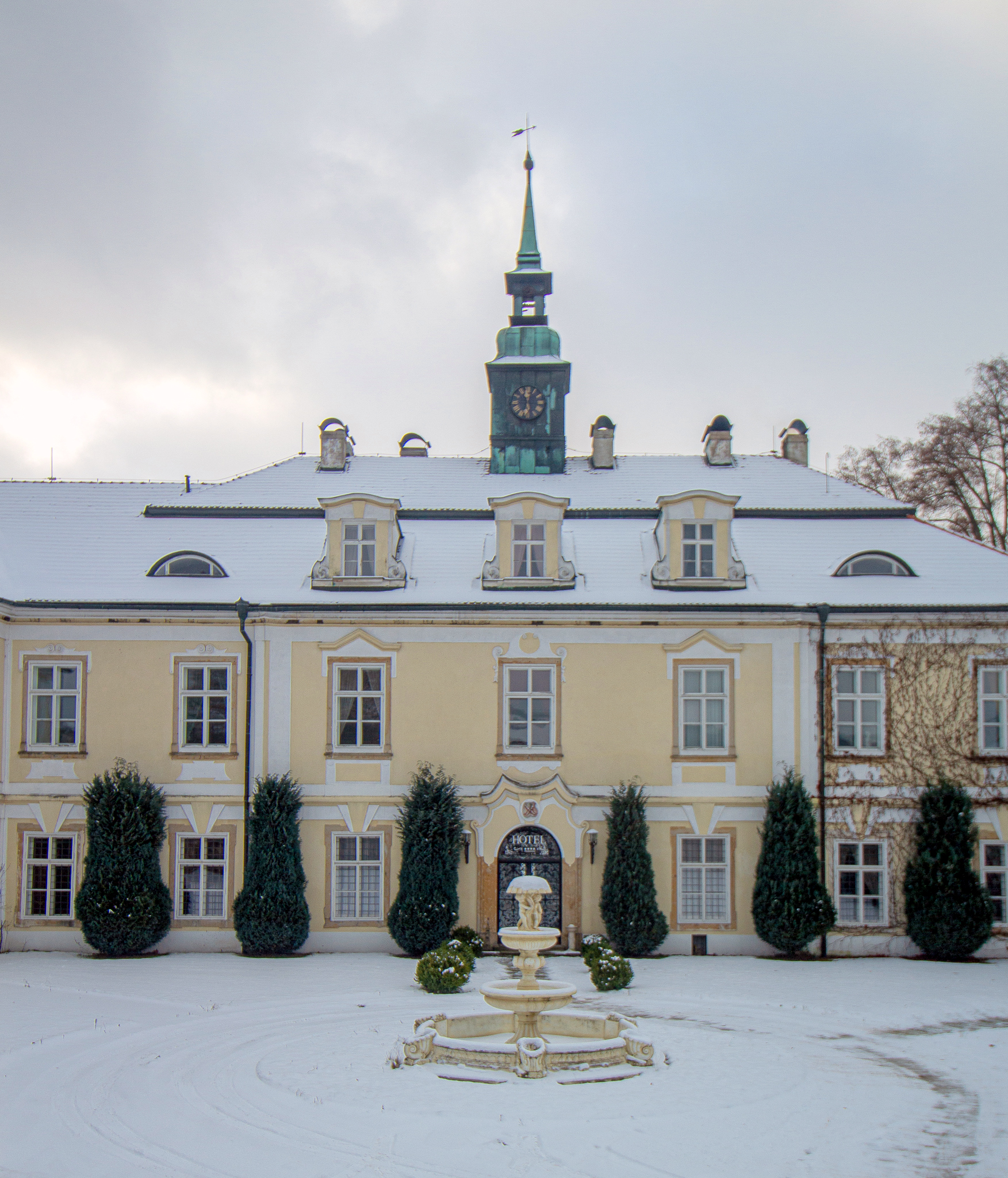
Nový Berštejn in 2022

Berštejn Castle is a 16th-century Czech castle located just outside the village of Dubá in the Doksy municipality. Berštejn also refers to a chateau near the castle.

== Starý Berštejn ==
Starý Berštejn (old Berštejn) is now merely a ruin situated on a hilltop outside of Dubá.

== Nový Berštejn ==
Nový Berštejn (new Berštejn) is a chateau just north of Dubá which has been converted to a hotel.
