= Skalice u České Lípy =

- Municipality
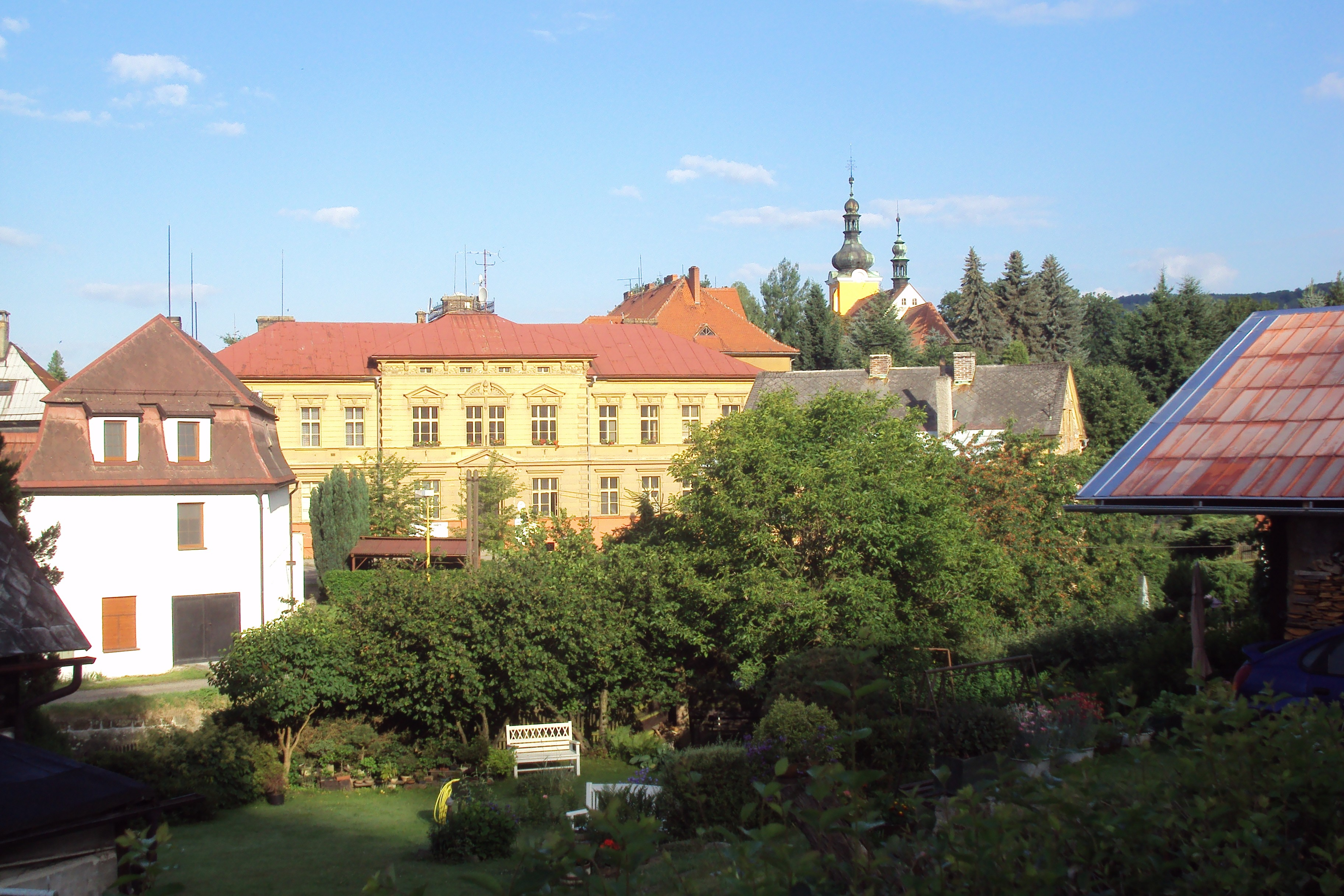
- View from the south

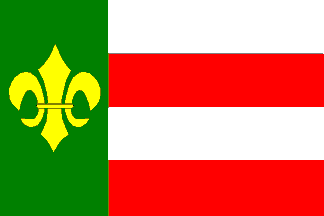
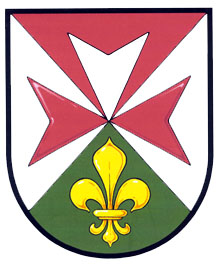
- Flag Coat of arms

- Location in the Czech Republic
- Coordinates: 50°44′43″N 14°31′50″E
- Country: Czech Republic
- Region: Liberec
- District: Česká Lípa
- First mentioned: 1352

Area
  - Total: 11.55 km^{2} (4.46 sq mi)
- Elevation: 324 m (1,063 ft)

Population (2026-01-01)
  - Total: 1,639
  - Density: 141.9/km^{2} (367.5/sq mi)
- Time zone: UTC+1 (CET)
  - Summer (DST): UTC+2 (CEST)
- Postal code: 471 17
- Website: www.skaliceuceskelipy.cz

Skalice u České Lípy (German: Langenau) is a municipality and village in Česká Lípa District in the Liberec Region of the Czech Republic. It has about 1,600 inhabitants.

== Demographics ==
Historical population
Year	Pop.	±%
1869	2,661	—
1880	3,061	+15.0%
1890	3,116	+1.8%
1900	3,286	+5.5%
1910	3,362	+2.3%
1921	3,009	−10.5%
1930	3,324	+10.5%
1950	1,659	−50.1%
1961	1,676	+1.0%
1970	1,659	−1.0%
1980	1,276	−23.1%
1991	1,074	−15.8%
2001	1,200	+11.7%
2011	1,423	+18.6%
2021	1,524	+7.1%
Source: Censuses

== Twin towns – sister cities ==
Skalice u České Lípy is twinned with:

- Bertsdorf-Hörnitz, Germany
