= Blíževedly =

- Municipality
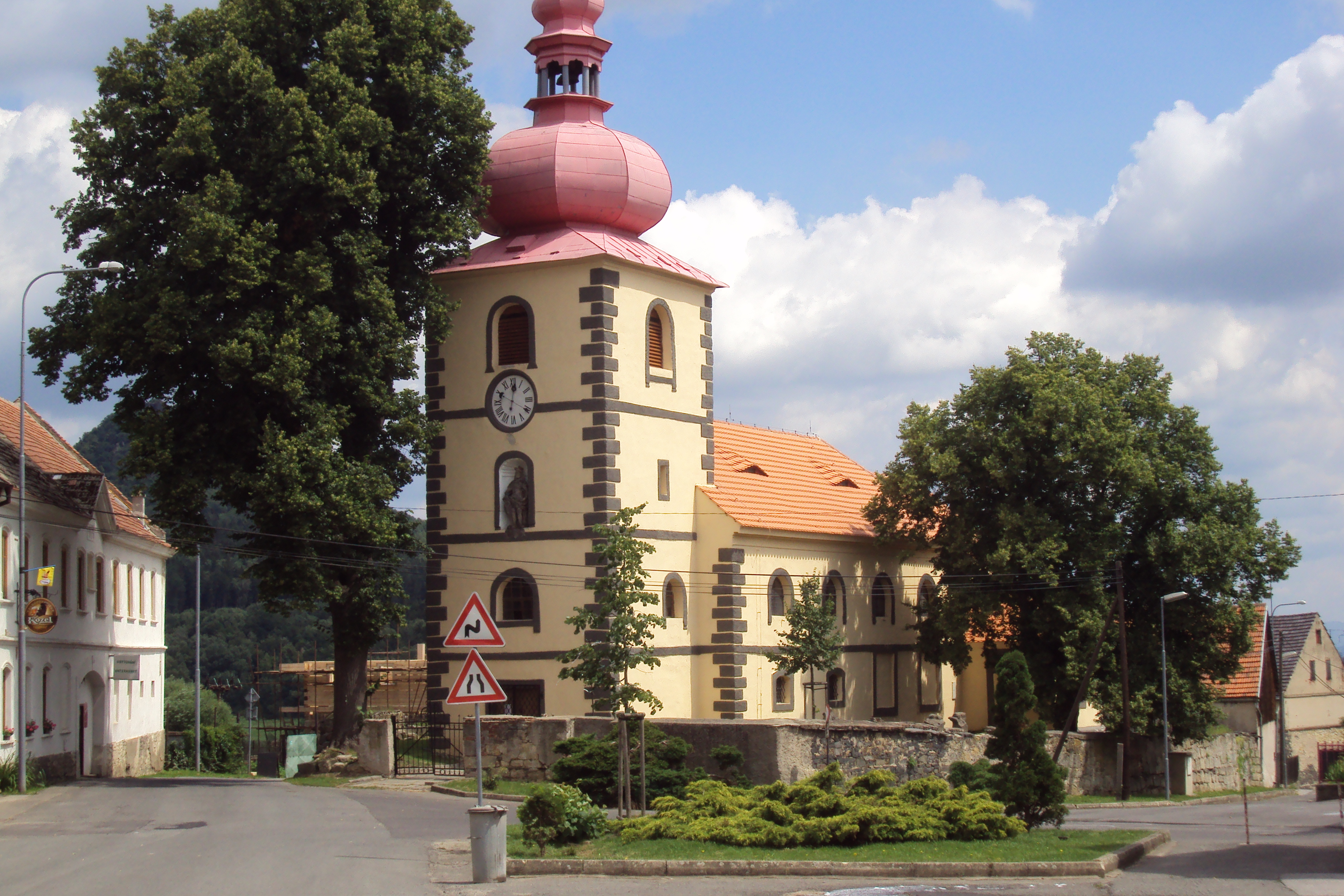
- Church of Saint Wenceslaus

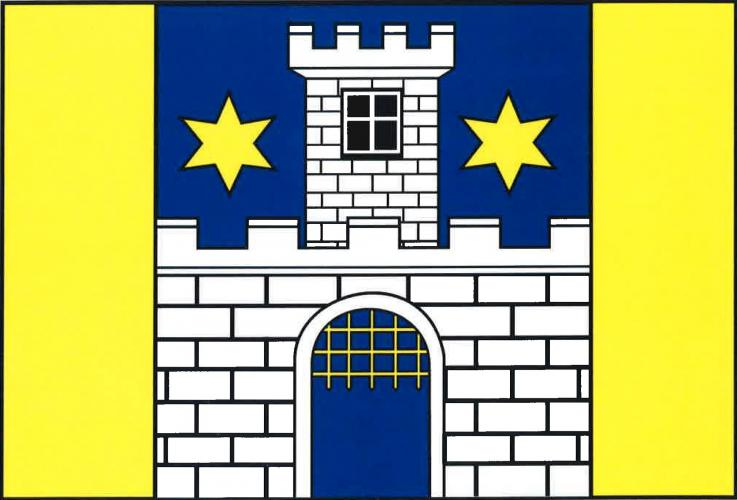
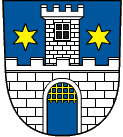
- Flag Coat of arms

- Location in the Czech Republic
- Coordinates: 50°36′31″N 14°23′48″E
- Country: Czech Republic
- Region: Liberec
- District: Česká Lípa
- First mentioned: 1290

Area
  - Total: 20.98 km^{2} (8.10 sq mi)
- Elevation: 361 m (1,184 ft)

Population (2026-01-01)
  - Total: 655
  - Density: 31.2/km^{2} (80.9/sq mi)
- Time zone: UTC+1 (CET)
  - Summer (DST): UTC+2 (CEST)
- Postal codes: 470 02, 471 04
- Website: www.obecblizevedly.cz

Blíževedly (German: Bleiswedel) is a municipality and village in Česká Lípa District in the Liberec Region of the Czech Republic. It has about 700 inhabitants.

== Administrative division ==
Blíževedly consists of four municipal parts (in brackets population according to the 2021 census):

- Blíževedly (415)
- Hvězda (12)
- Litice (44)
- Skalka (118)

== Demographics ==
Historical population
Year	Pop.	±%
1869	1,440	—
1880	1,467	+1.9%
1890	1,438	−2.0%
1900	1,394	−3.1%
1910	1,315	−5.7%
1921	1,249	−5.0%
1930	1,341	+7.4%
1950	769	−42.7%
1961	739	−3.9%
1970	630	−14.7%
1980	606	−3.8%
1991	569	−6.1%
2001	632	+11.1%
2011	626	−0.9%
2021	589	−5.9%
Source: Censuses
