= Berka of Dubá =

Bohemian noble family

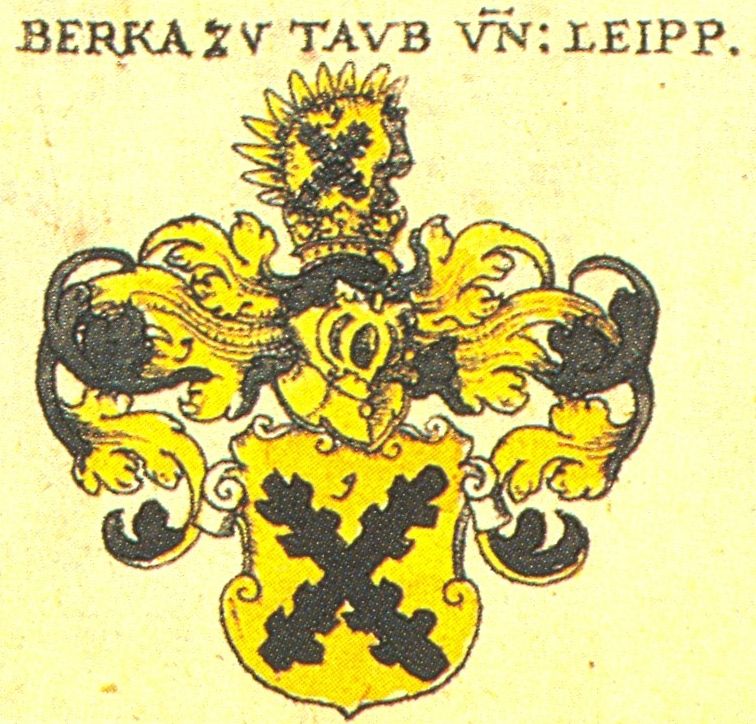
Coat of arms of the Berka z Dubé

Berka of Dubá (Czech: Berka z Dubé) was a cadet branch of a Bohemian noble family of Lords of Dubá established by Hynek Berka of Dubá (1249–1306). It held estates in what is today the Czech Republic and Saxony in Germany throughout the Middle Ages.

== Ancestors ==
This old Czech family separated from the family of the lords of Dubé and are thus one of the lines of the Ronovci. The Ronovci derive their origin from Smil from Tuháně from the end of the 12th century. His sons Jindřich and Častolov are mentioned in the first half of the 13th century as brothers from Tuhán and Žitava, who acquired the region in the north from the monarch. They and their sons founded other family branches, e.g. the lords of Klinštejn, the lords of Lipá, the Lichtenburks and the lords of Duba (Berkov, Adršpach, Škop). The majority of the Ronians supported the king militarily and also obtained property, titles, and important positions in the kingdom for this.

As regards the Berka from Dubá, the elder of the sons, Častolov from Žitava, is most relevant. He had three sons - Jindřich, Častolov and Chvalo, as well as a daughter. The ancestor of the lords of Dubá is the eldest son Jindřich, mentioned in documents between 1249 and 1290. At first as Jindřich, Hajman, then mainly as Hynek z Dubé (Hynek is transliterated via Latin as Jindřich by later chroniclers). This Hynek or Jindřich also had three sons, Hynek, Albrecht and Čeňko.

The eldest son, Hynek (younger) of Dubé, who is mentioned in archives from 1276 to 1309 and died before 1316, had four sons:

- Půta, called from Dubá, Frýdlant, Adršpach, documented 1295–1318 – founder of the Adršpach family from Dubá
- Hynek Žák or Hynek Scholaris, documented 1306–1333 - as Olomouc bishop listed as Jindřich Berka z Dubé
- Hynek Berka from Dubé, born about 1297 – founder of the Berk family
- Hynáček from Houska, documented for the first time in 1316, died in 1320

== Domanial ==
Houska, Bělá pod Bezdězem, Bezděz, Lemberk, Dubá, Zákupy, Milštejn, Tolštejn, Kokořín, Kuřívody, Berštejn, Mühlberg (until the 15th century), Herrschaft Hohnstein (Saxony) – given in exchange for Mühlberg to the House of Wettin in 1443.

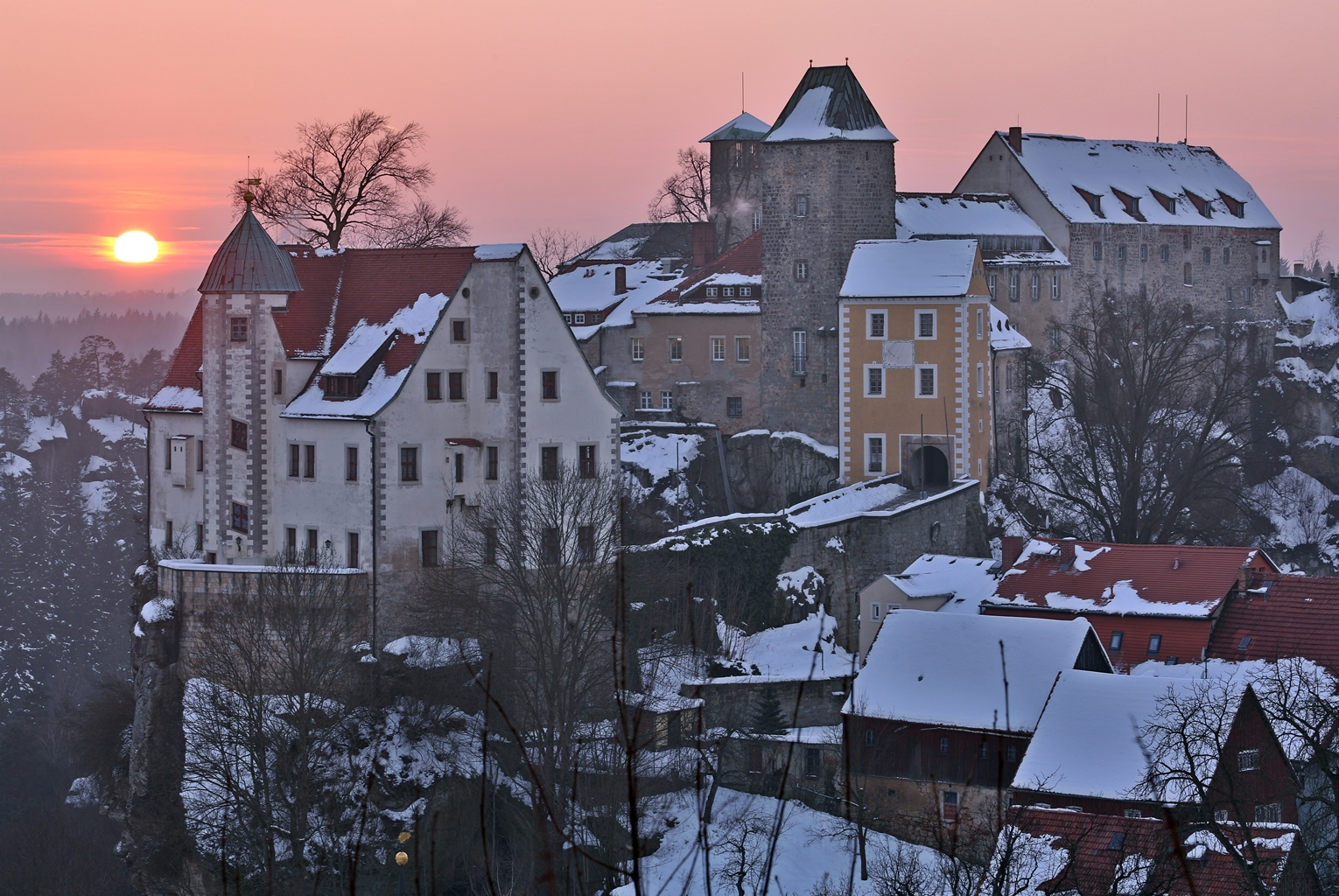
Hohnstein Castle in Saxony

== End of line ==
After the Battle of White Mountain on 8 November 1620, many of the members were expelled together with the King Frederick I and domanials were confiscated. One of the family members, loyal to the Emperor Ferdinand II, was created an Imperial Count in 1637. Line died off in the 18th century, some descendants of expellees after the Battle of White Mountain remained in Sweden and in Saxony during 18th and 19th centuries.

== Notable members ==
- Zbyněk Berka of Dubá, Archbishop of Prague in 1592–1606.
