= Žandov =

- Town
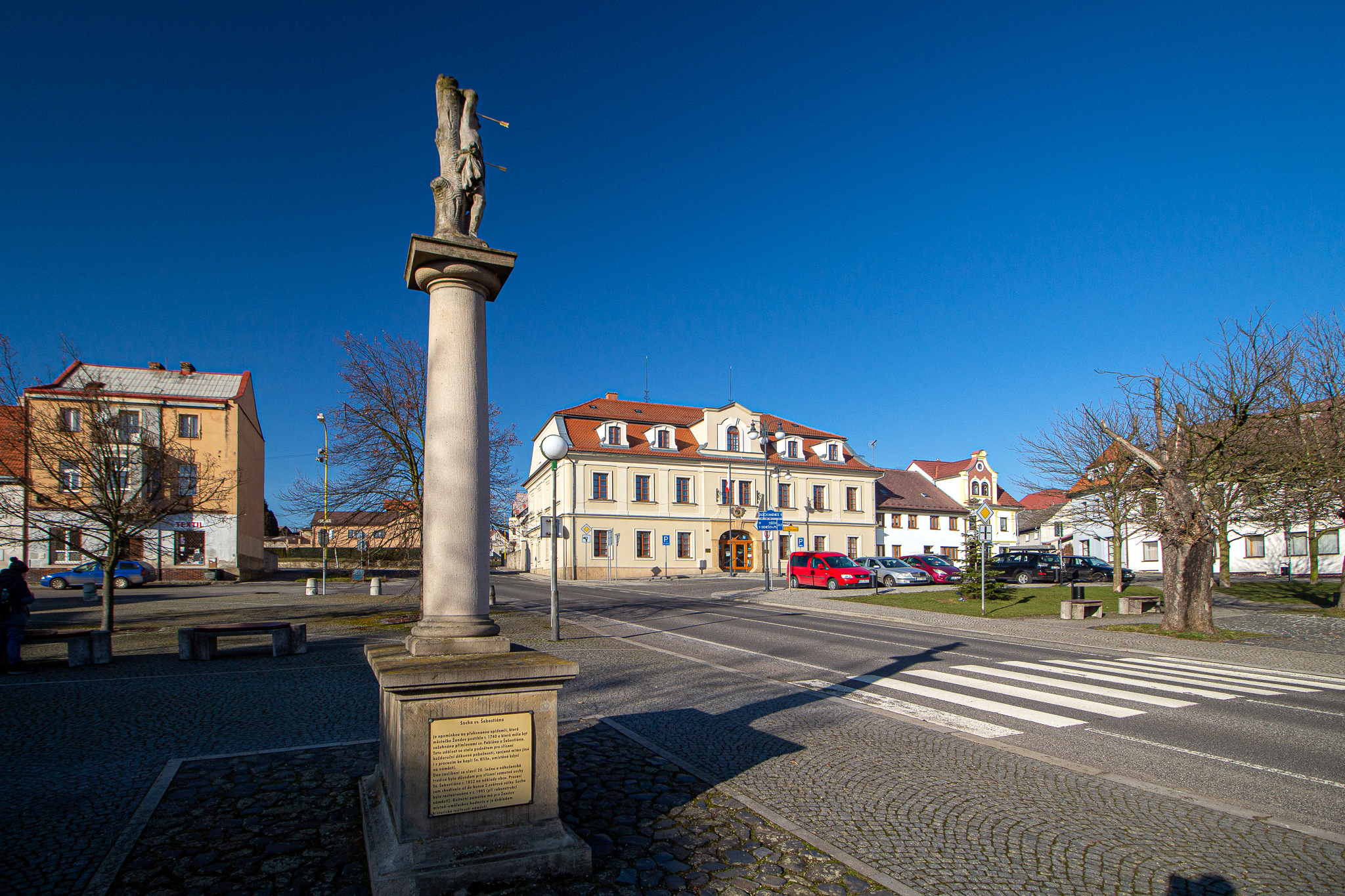
- Town square

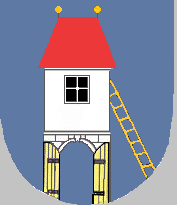
- Coat of arms

- Location in the Czech Republic
- Coordinates: 50°42′50″N 14°23′47″E
- Country: Czech Republic
- Region: Liberec
- District: Česká Lípa
- First mentioned: 1282

Area
  - Total: 27.23 km^{2} (10.51 sq mi)
- Elevation: 263 m (863 ft)

Population (2026-01-01)
  - Total: 1,915
  - Density: 70.33/km^{2} (182.1/sq mi)
- Time zone: UTC+1 (CET)
  - Summer (DST): UTC+2 (CEST)
- Postal codes: 470 02, 471 05, 471 07
- Website: www.zandov.cz

Žandov (Czech pronunciation: [ˈʒandof]; German: Sandau) is a town in Česká Lípa District in the Liberec Region of the Czech Republic. It has about 1,900 inhabitants.

== Administrative division ==
Žandov consists of seven municipal parts (in brackets population according to the 2021 census):

- Žandov (1,352)
- Dolní Police (54)
- Heřmanice (135)
- Novosedlo (21)
- Radeč (97)
- Valteřice (148)
- Velká Javorská (37)

== Etymology ==
The initial German name Sandau was derived from the German words Sand ('sand') and Aue ('meadow'). The Czech name was derived from the German name.

== Geography ==
Žandov is located about 10 kilometres (6 mi) west of Česká Lípa and 25 km (16 mi) east of Ústí nad Labem. It lies in the Central Bohemian Uplands. The highest point is the hill Havraní vrch at 586 m (1,923 ft) above sea level. The Ploučnice River flows through the town. The entire municipal territory lies within the České středohoří Protected Landscape Area.

== History ==
The first written mention of Žandov is from 1282. The longest and most important owners of Žandov were the Berka of Dubá family (before 1428) and the Vartenberk family (from 1428). In the middle of the 15th century, the village was promoted to a town. From 1938 to 1945, it was annexed to Nazi Germany and administered as a part of the Reichsgau Sudetenland. After World War II, Žandov lost its status of a town, but regained it in 1998.

== Demographics ==
Historical population

Year	Pop.	±%
1869	3,896	—
1880	4,003	+2.7%
1890	3,648	−8.9%
1900	3,365	−7.8%
1910	3,281	−2.5%

Year	Pop.	±%
1921	3,159	−3.7%
1930	3,286	+4.0%
1950	1,952	−40.6%
1961	2,095	+7.3%
1970	2,050	−2.1%

Year	Pop.	±%
1980	2,336	+14.0%
1991	1,990	−14.8%
2001	1,892	−4.9%
2011	1,930	+2.0%
2021	1,844	−4.5%

Source: Censuses

== Transport ==
Žandov is located on the railway line Liberec–Děčín.

== Sights ==
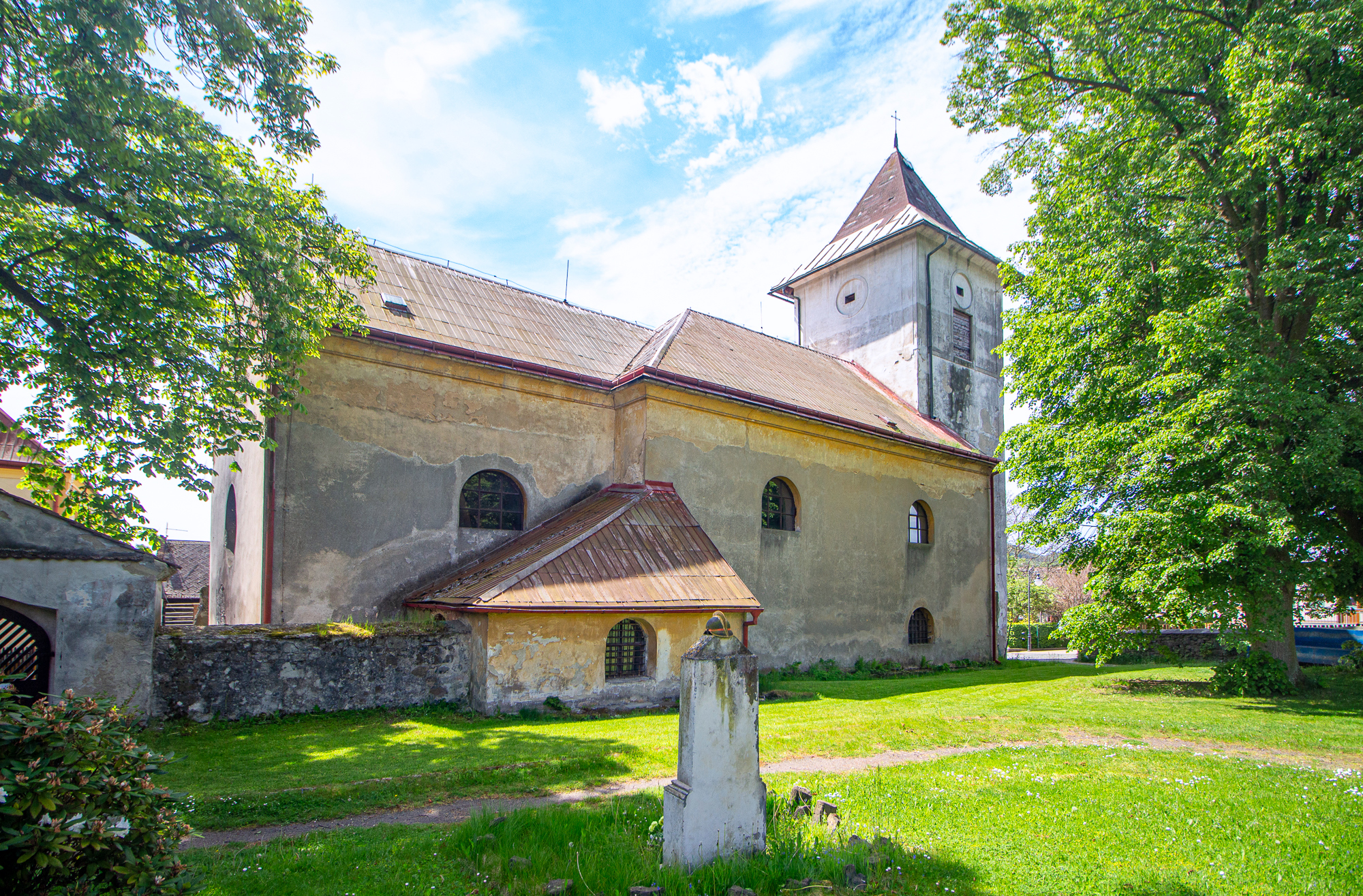
Church of Saint Bartholomew

The main landmark of Žandov is the Church of Saint Bartholomew. It is originally a Gothic church, rebuilt in 1540 and 1682. The current look is the result of the late Baroque modifications from 1775.

In the middle of the town square is a fountain from 1853 and a statue of Saint Sebastian from 1822.
