= Horní Libchava =

- Municipality
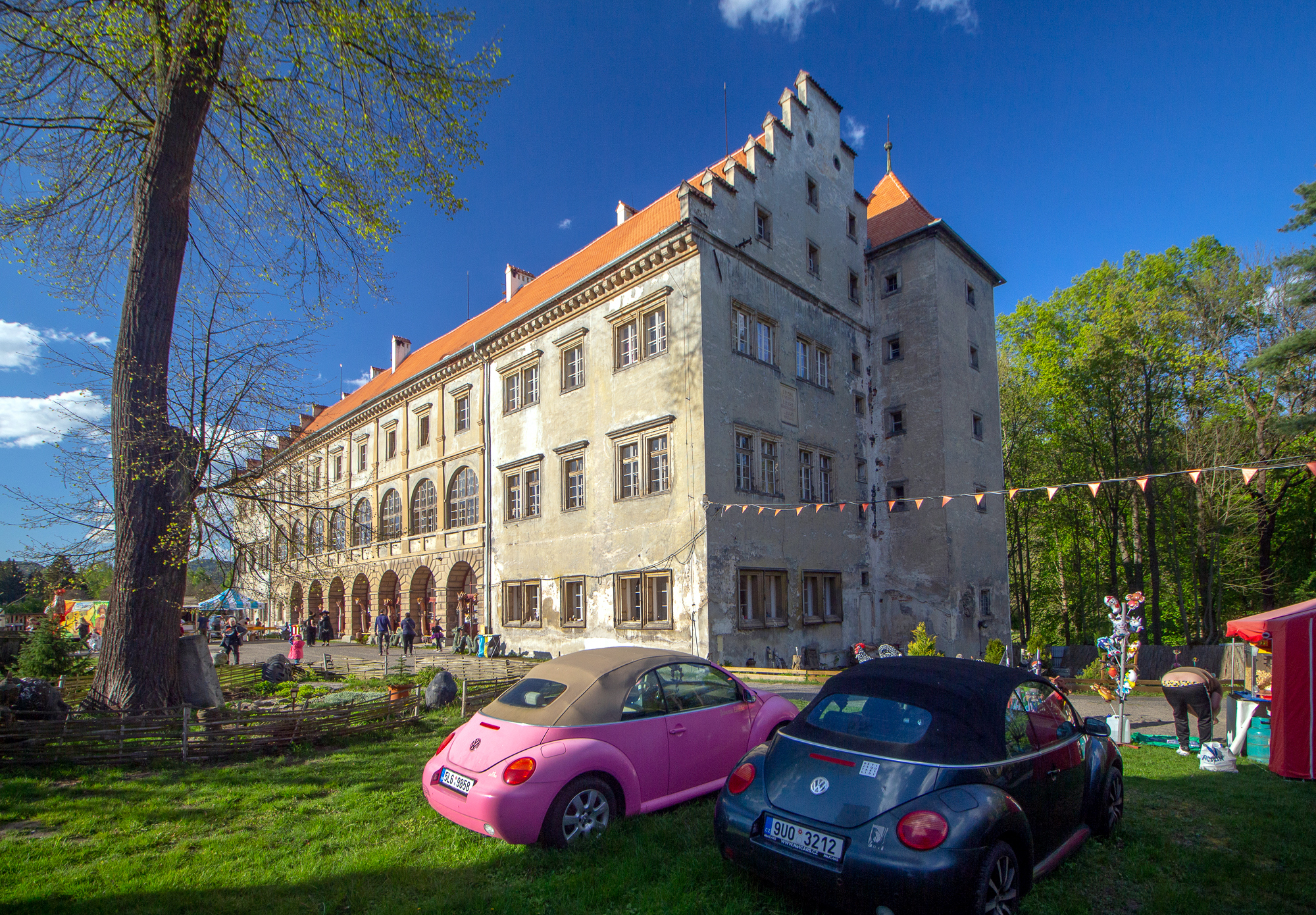
- Horní Libchava Castle

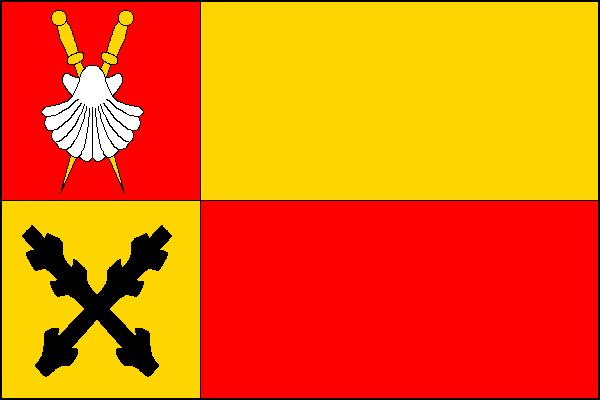
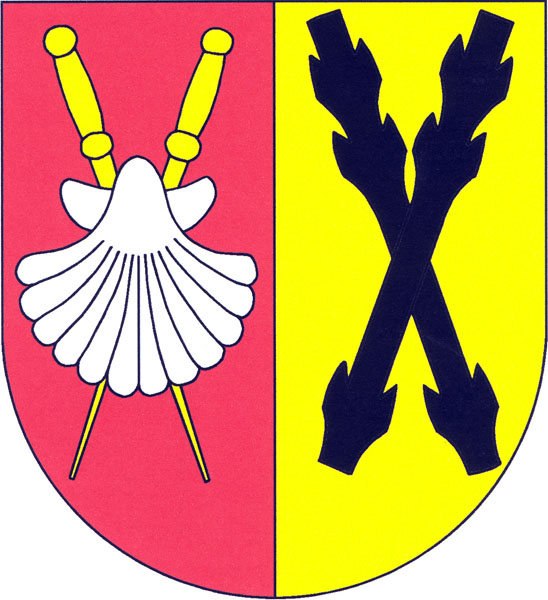
- Flag Coat of arms

- Location in the Czech Republic
- Coordinates: 50°42′46″N 14°29′36″E
- Country: Czech Republic
- Region: Liberec
- District: Česká Lípa
- First mentioned: 1352

Area
  - Total: 10.38 km^{2} (4.01 sq mi)
- Elevation: 258 m (846 ft)

Population (2026-01-01)
  - Total: 867
  - Density: 83.5/km^{2} (216/sq mi)
- Time zone: UTC+1 (CET)
  - Summer (DST): UTC+2 (CEST)
- Postal code: 471 11
- Website: www.obechornilibchava.cz

Horní Libchava (German: Oberliebich) is a municipality and village in Česká Lípa District in the Liberec Region of the Czech Republic. It has about 900 inhabitants.

== Etymology ==
The earliest writing of the name Libchava was Lubchava. The name consists of the adjective ľubý (meaning 'nice', 'pleasant') and the suffix -ava, used to name watercourses. The name was therefore transferred to the village from the local stream. The prefix horní ('upper') distinguished it from Dolní Libchava ('lower Libchava', today part of Česká Lípa).

== Geography ==
Horní Libchava is located about 4 kilometres (2 mi) northwest of Česká Lípa and 38 km (24 mi) west of Liberec. It lies mostly in the Ralsko Uplands, but the municipal territory also extends into the Central Bohemian Uplands in the northwest. The highest point is at 412 m (1,352 ft) above sea level. The Šporka Stream flows through the municipality. The village is surrounded by several small fishponds. Half of the municipal territory lies within the České středohoří Protected Landscape Area.

== History ==
The first written mention of Horní Libchava is in the register of the Papal tithes from 1352. The village was founded in the castle grounds of the Klinštejn Castle, which was founded after 1300 and was first documented in 1339. In 1426, the village and the church were burned down by the Hussites. From 1653 to 1925, Horní Libchava was the centre of an estate owned by the Knights Hospitaller.

== Demographics ==
Historical population

Year	Pop.	±%
1869	1,028	—
1880	1,041	+1.3%
1890	938	−9.9%
1900	960	+2.3%
1910	971	+1.1%

Year	Pop.	±%
1921	975	+0.4%
1930	1,047	+7.4%
1950	639	−39.0%
1961	505	−21.0%
1970	458	−9.3%

Year	Pop.	±%
1980	392	−14.4%
1991	320	−18.4%
2001	332	+3.8%
2011	682	+105.4%
2021	808	+18.5%

Source: Censuses

== Transport ==
There are no railways or major roads passing through the municipality.

== Sights ==
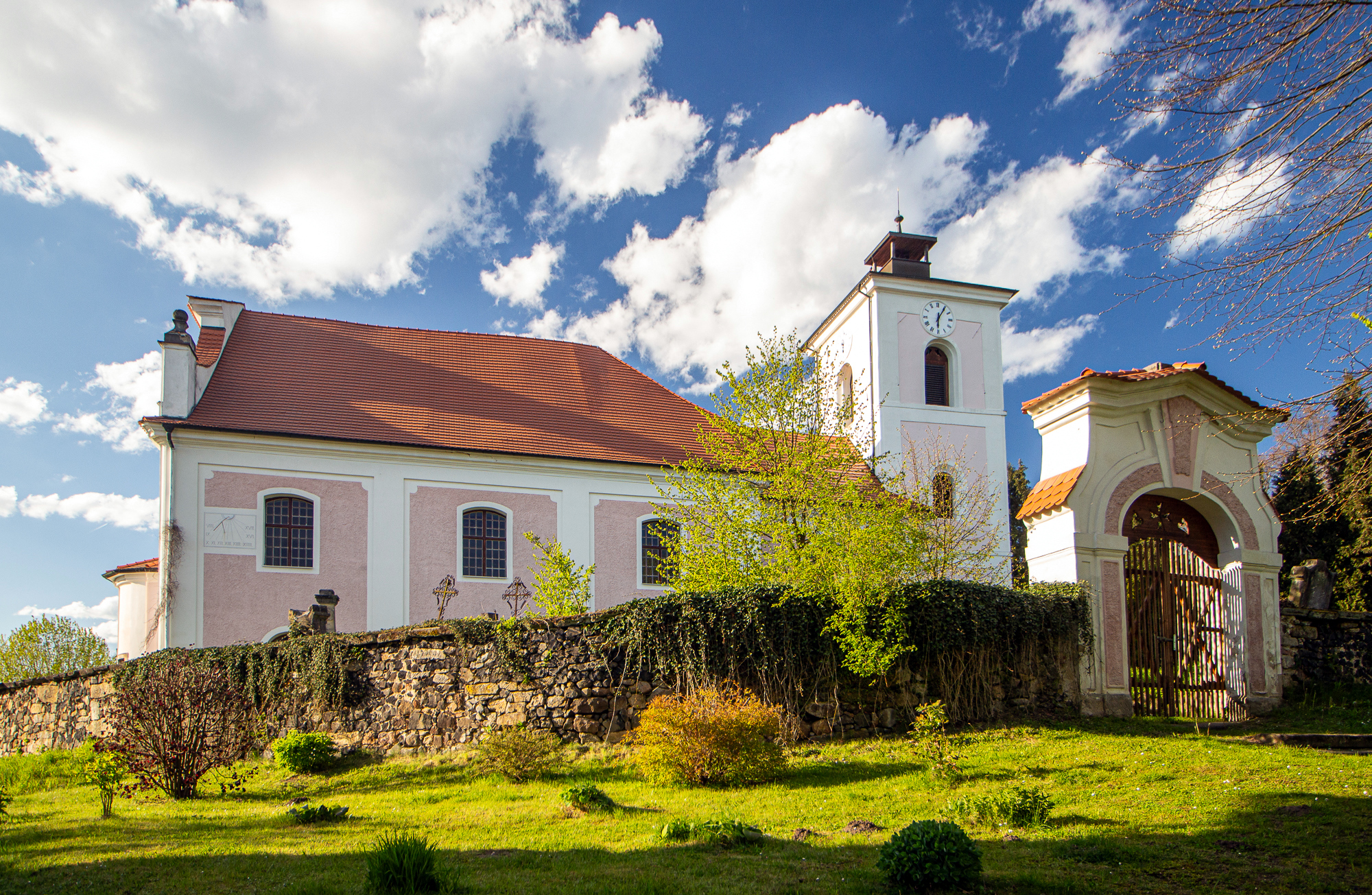
Church of Saint James the Great

The main landmark of Horní Libchava is the Church of Saint James the Great. The original church was as old as the village, but it has to be completely rebuilt after the Hussite Wars. The sacristy was added in 1499. The current appearance of the church is the result of the Baroque reconstruction from 1736.

The Horní Libchava Castle was originally a small manor house from the 16th century, which was rebuilt into a Renaissance residence in 1574.

Nothing survived from the above-ground parts of Klinštejn Castle, and the location is now just an archaeological site.
