= Czech nobility =

Czech nobility (also Bohemian nobility; Czech: česká šlechta) consists of the noble families from historical Czech lands, especially in their narrow sense, i.e. nobility of Bohemia proper, Moravia and Austrian Silesia – whether these families originated from those countries or moved into them through the centuries. These are connected with the history of Great Moravia, Duchy of Bohemia, later Kingdom of Bohemia, Margraviate of Moravia, the Duchies of Silesia and the Crown of Bohemia, the constitutional predecessor state of the modern-day Czech Republic.

Noble titles were abolished by law (No. 61/1918 Sb. z. a n.) (Note: Exact wording of this "Law of 10 December 1918, which abolished the nobility, medals and titles" is available on the Czech Wikisource) in December 1918, shortly after the establishment of the independent Czechoslovak Republic. The public use of noble titles could be punished by a fine or imprisonment. During the period of Nazi occupation some sections of the law No. 61/1918 were abolished and the public use of noble titles was no longer punishable as a misdemeanor. This did not last long, as the regulations from the Nazi period were abolished again after the liberation of Czechoslovakia in 1945. However shortly after the communist takeover the par of the law which made the public use of noble titles punishable was abolished again and the new law concerning the titles completely ignored the issue of noble titles, thus made their use possible at least in theory. However, during the Nazi period, as well as the communist one, some individual representatives of Czech noble families were persecuted. After the Velvet Revolution in 1989, the property confiscated by the communists was returned to the families of former nobility or their relatives.

== History ==
The beginnings of the Czech nobility can be seen in the time of the first Přemyslid princes and kings, i.e. in the 9th century. As a legally defined state of nobility in the Czech lands, it arose in the course of the 13th century, when members of noble families began to own newly built stone castles. The influence of the nobility rose rapidly, which became the cause of a strained relationship between the king and the nobility during the last Přemyslid kings and especially during the reign of John of Bohemia and his grandson, Wenceslaus IV at the turn of the 14th and 15th centuries. After the burning of Jan Hus in 1415, Czech society and therefore the Czech nobility was divided into two groups - Catholic and Hussite (later Protestant). Both groups were at war with each other both during the Hussite Wars and long after them. After the end of the Hussite Wars and the rule of the Luxembourgers in the 1530s, the country was controlled by various noble associations. In 1452, they agreed on a land administrator, who became the noble George of Poděbrady. Five years later he was elected King of Bohemia, but disputes between the Catholic and Protestant nobility continued until the outbreak of the Thirty Years' War in 1618.

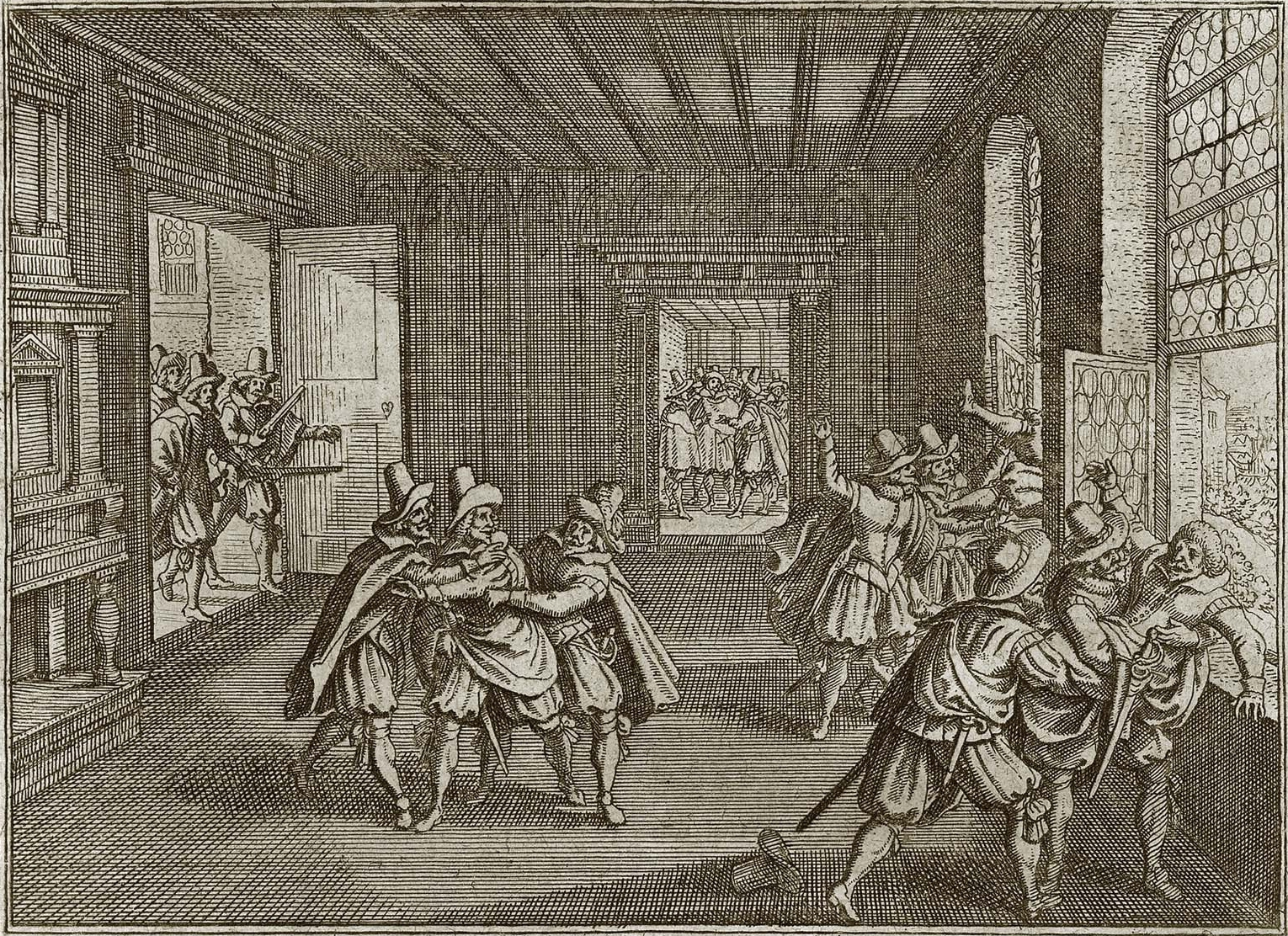
Defenestration of Prague, 1618

The status of the nobility further increased in 1500, when the Vladislav land constitution was issued. In 1526, Ferdinand I of Habsburg was elected King of Bohemia. He, along with his successors, tried to reduce the influence of the nobility. This process was interrupted during the reign of Rudolf II in the years 1576-1611. In 1618, the Protestant part of the Czech estates started the Bohemian Revolt by throwing imperial officials out of the windows of Prague Castle. Czech Protestants were defeated in the Battle of White Mountain in 1620, and the following year 27 leaders of this rebellion were executed. Thus, the Catholic aristocracy definitively won over the Protestant aristocracy in Bohemia, but at the same time the absolutist monarchy won over the estate monarchy.

During the Thirty Years' War after the Battle of White Mountain, a large part of the Protestant nobility had their property confiscated. Many new noble families came to the Czech lands at this time, originally usually from Germany, Italy, Spain, Austria or Scotland. Of the old Czech noble families, for example, the Kinsky, Sternberg, Kolowrat, Czernin, Lobkowicz, Pernštejn or Lichtenstein families remained in Bohemia, while the Eggenberg, Bucquoy, Colloredo-Mannsfeld, Gallas, Piccolomini, Schwarzenberg and others arrived.

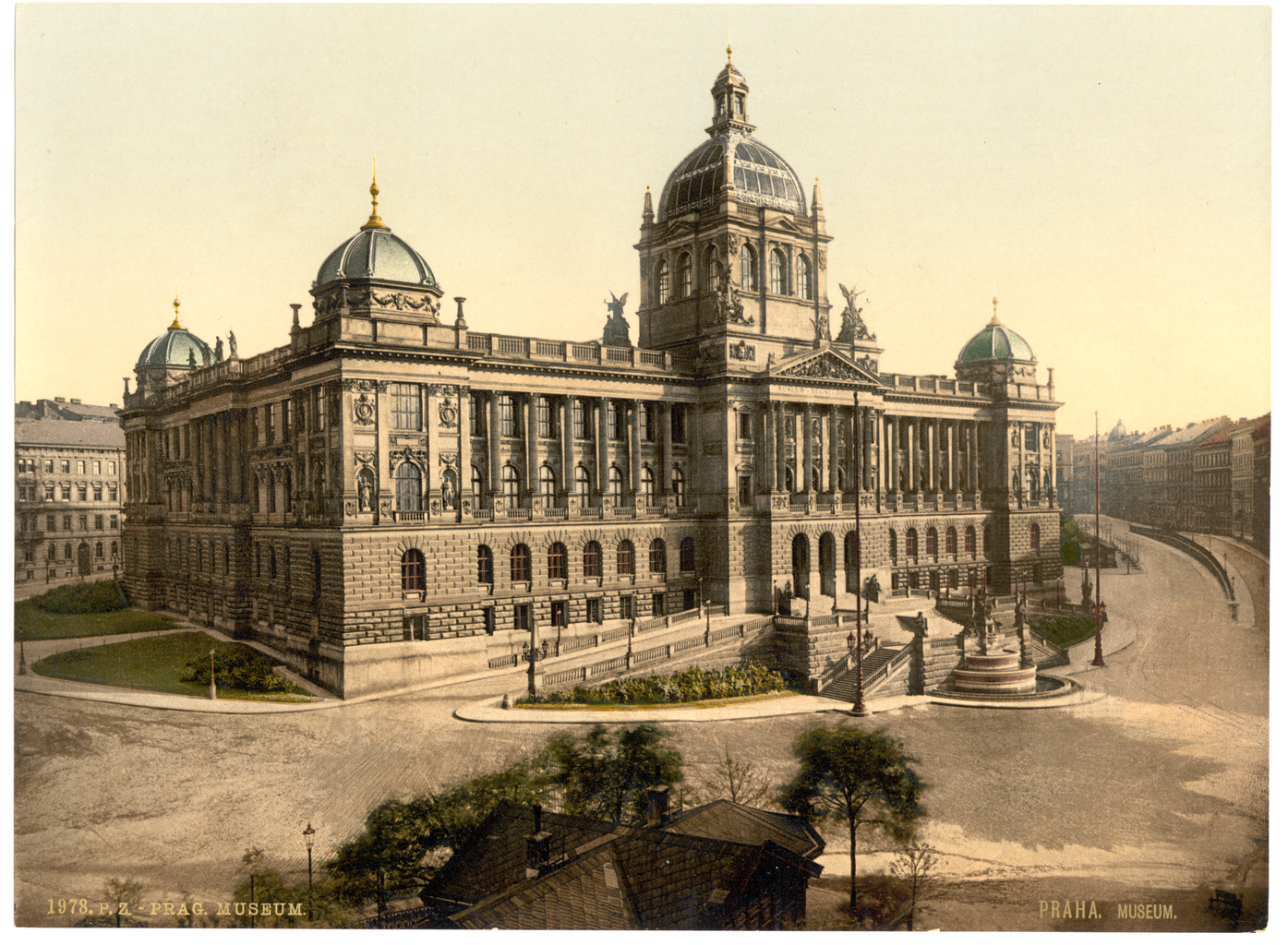
Many members of the Czech nobility participated in the creation of the National Museum in Prague (founded in 1818)

From the 17th century, only the Catholic Czech nobility significantly participated in the functioning of the Habsburg Monarchy. Newly arrived families gradually identified with the Czech lands and often also with the Czech language. At the end of the 18th century, a period called Josephinism began. His representative, the Emperor and King Joseph II (1780-1790), initiated extensive reforms that significantly changed the position of the nobility and reduced the number of aristocratic privileges. Part of the modernization of the country was also the prioritization of German at the expense of Czech (the purpose was more efficient state administration).

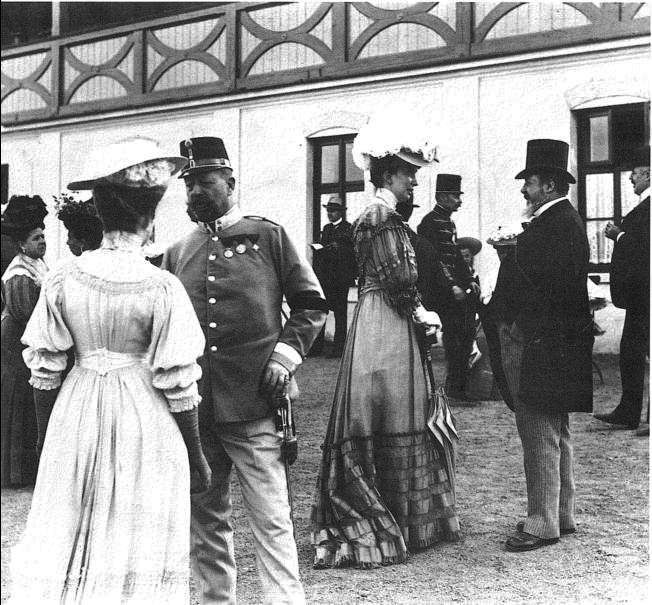
A snapshot showing members of the Czech nobility during a horse race in Prague, 1900

During the 19th century, the Czech nobility was significantly involved in the process of national revival, the promotion of the Czech language and the emergence of modern Czech culture and society. Prominent representatives of the patriotic nobility were especially the Sternberg, Chotek, Schwarzenberg, Czernin, Kolowrat, Kinsky and Lobkowicz. In the second half of the 19th century, representatives of these and other families became involved in emerging parliamentary activity. The patriotically oriented nobles founded the Party of the Conservative Estate, cooperating with the Old Czech Party, another aristocratic political force was the Party of the Constitutionalist Estate. In the second half of the 19th century, the ranks of the Czech nobility were expanded by successful businessmen, politicians and artists, for example the Bartoň family, the founder of the Škoda Works Emil Škoda, the industrialist František Rienghoffer, the leader of the Old Czech Party František Ladislav Rieger, the composer Antonín Dvořák and the writer Jaroslav Vrchlický. The representatives of this so-called new nobility, however, usually remained outside the Czech aristocracy.

After the First World War, the monarchy disappeared in the Czech lands and a republic was established. Most of the Czech nobility held monarchist positions, but remained loyal to the newly established Czechoslovak Republic. Some nobles even entered the service of the Czechoslovak Republic and worked in diplomacy (for example, representatives of the Lobkowicz, Schwarzenberg and others). The Czechoslovak Republic confiscated the property of the Habsburgs and Hohenbergs, and the Clam-Martinic family also lost their property. During the following years, the property was sold off and the Fürstenbergs, for example, left the country.

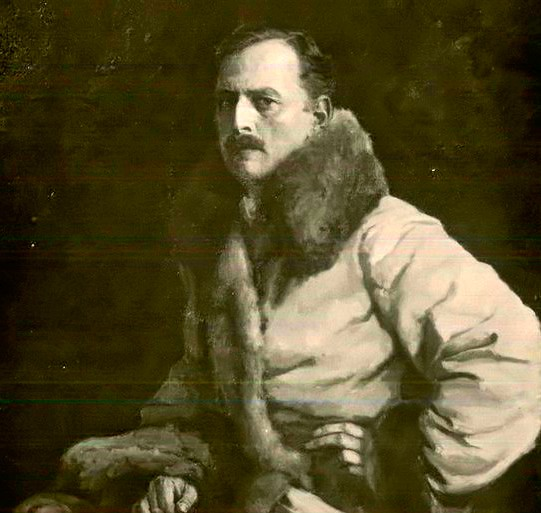
Count Zdenko Radslav Kinský (above), author of the idea of the Declaration of the Czech Nobility and Prince Karel VI. Schwarzenberg, author of the text of the Declaration

The turning point occurred in 1938. In response to the direct threat to the democratic state by Nazi Germany, the most important noble families issued a Declaration of the members of the old Czech families on the inviolability of the territory of the Czech state. During the audience with President Edvard Beneš, members of the Schwarzenberg, Lobkowicz, Kinsky, Kolowrat, Czernin, Sternberg, Colloredo-Mannsfeld, Parish, Dobrzenský, Strachwitz, and Belcredi publicly joined him. A similar statement was issued a year later, already in the occupied Protectorate of Bohemia and Moravia. In September 1939, the National Declaration of the Czech Nobility was drawn up, in which 85 of the most important Czech noblemen from 33 noble families declared their Czech nationality. The Nazis subsequently confiscated the property of these nobles, and some then lived through the war in house internment or in concentration camps. Some nobles managed to emigrate. Part of the nobles actively participated in the domestic resistance, for example the Bořek-Dohalský brothers were murdered in a concentration camp, Karel VI Schwarzenberg or Václav Norbert Kinský participated in the anti-Nazi uprising in 1945.

In 1945, the properties of most Czech noble families were returned. However, there was a deportation of the majority of the population of German nationality, in which both the nobles who collaborated with the Nazis and the nobles who did not collaborate with the Nazis, but only claimed German nationality before the war, lost their property. For example, Trauttmansdorff, Windischgrätz, Clam-Gallas, Thurn-Taxis, Desfours, or one branch of the Kinsky, Czernin and Rohan families had to leave the Czech lands. Due to the growing influence of the communists in Czechoslovakia in the years 1945-1948, the return of some property was also withheld (the Colloredo-Mannsfeld case), or the unjust confiscation of the primogeniture property of the Schwarzenberg family (based on the Lex Schwarzenberg Act of 1947). The Liechtenstein family is still suing the Czech Republic for seized property, as well as several other families labeled as Germans after the war.

In 1948, there was a communist coup in Czechoslovakia. Subsequently, the property of all noble families was confiscated. A large part of the Czech nobility therefore emigrated (for example, the Schwarzenberg, Colloredo-Mannsfelds, Kolowrat, Hildprand, some Lobkowicz or Sternberg). The nobles who stayed at home (such as the Kinsky, Wratislav, Czernin, some Sternberg and Lobkowicz) were variously persecuted, for example they were prevented from studying, usually they were also evicted to unsuitable dwellings. Some members of the Czech nobility were imprisoned.

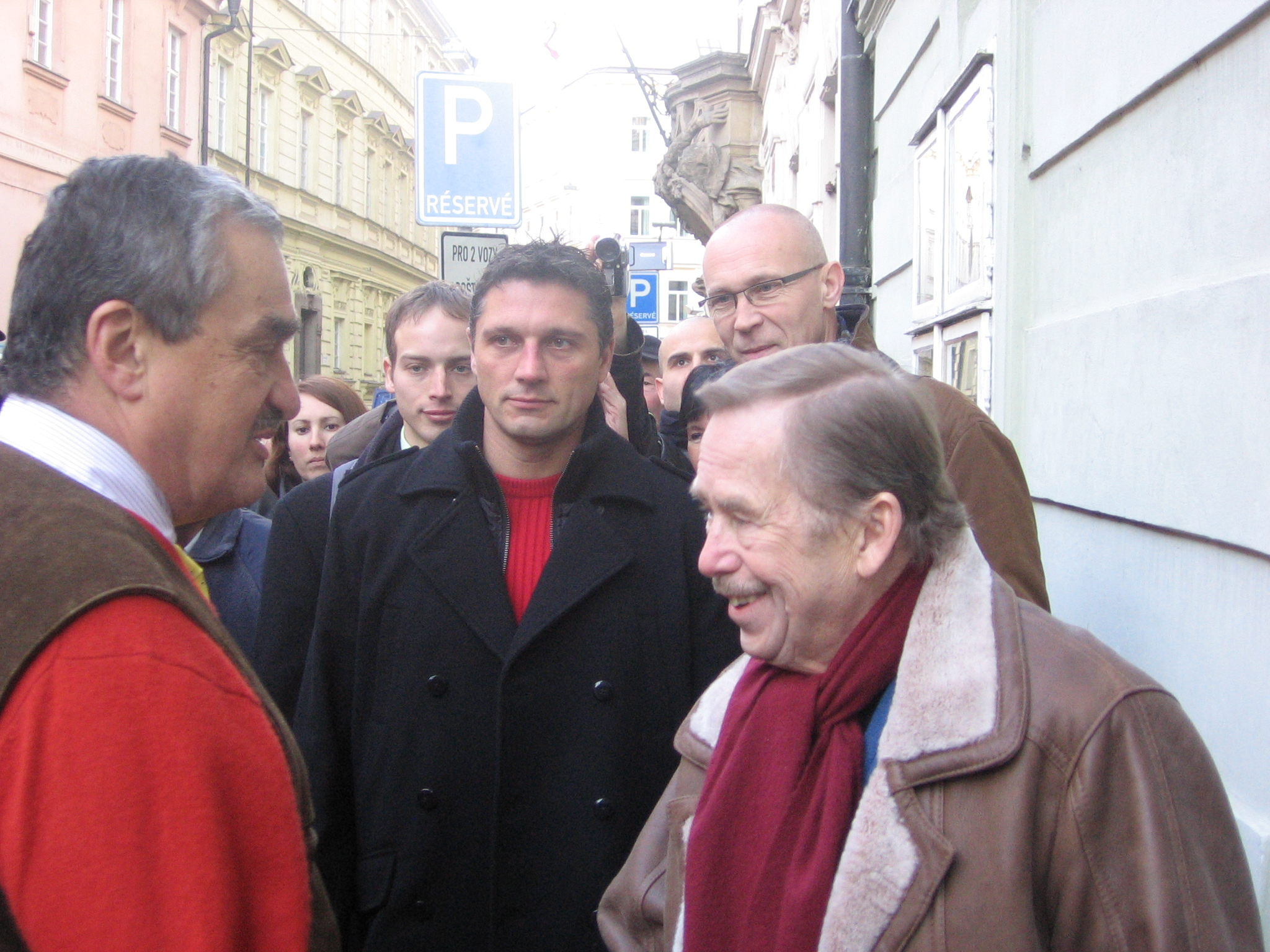
Prince Karel VII. Schwarzenberg and Czech President Václav Havel in 2008

After the Velvet Revolution in 1989, properties seized by the communist regime were returned to their original owners. Members of the Czech nobility who emigrated abroad returned to their estates. Some subsequently returned to public life (for example, Karel Schwarzenberg as Minister of Foreign Affairs, Member of Parliament and Senator, Michal Lobkowicz as Minister of Defense and Member of Parliament, Tomáš Czernin as Senator). Other Czech nobles devote themselves, for example, to business, culture, science, the church, or knightly orders.

== Oldest noble families ==
The oldest founding families (numbering around twenty) of the Czech and Moravian nobility include:

- Buzici
  - Zajícové z Házmburka
  - Šelmberkové
- Benešovici
  - Lords of Dubé
  - Lords of Kravař
  - Lords of Bechyně
- Drslavici
  - Švihovští z Rýzmberka
  - Czernin family
- Hrabišici
- Hroznatovci
- Janovici
  - Kolowrats
- Markvartici
  - Lemberkové
  - Vartenberkové
  - Waldstein
- Ronovci
  - Lichtenburkové
  - Klinštejns
  - Lords of Lipé
  - Lords of Dubé
- Vítkovci
  - Lords of Hradce
  - Lords of Krumlova
  - Rosenbergs
  - Lords of Landštejn
  - Lords of Stráže
- Zierotins and others.

== List of important noble families ==
- Bavor of Strakonice
- Belcredi
- Berchtold of Ungarschitz
- Bibra
- Boskowicz
- Bořek-Dohalský
- Bruntálský of Vrbno
- Bubna of Litice
- Chorinský of Ledská
- Clary-Aldringen
- Colloredo-Mannsfeld
- Czernin
- Chotek
- Deym of Střítež
- Dobřenský of Dobřenice
- Dubá
- Berka of Dubá
- Jelení
- Hildprandt
- Harrach
- Hradec
- Hohenberg
- Kamenický of Kamenice
- Kinsky
- Colditz
- Kolowrat
- Kaunitz
- Krajíř of Krajek
- Kravaře
- Kunštát
- Lažanský of Buková
- Lichtenburg
- Liechtenstein
- Lanna
- Larisch-Moennich
- Lichnowsky
- Lipá
- Lobkowicz
- Martinic
- Nostitz
- Paar
- Pernštejn
- Pruskowski
- Piccolomini
- Poděbrady
- Přemyslid
- Rohan
- Ronovci
- Rosenberg
- Švihovský of Rýzmberk
- Slavata of Chlum
- Slavník
- Smiřický of Smiřice
- Schlick
- Schwarzenberg
- Sporck
- Sternberg
- Schwamberg
- Thun-Hohenstein
- Trčka of Lípa
- Tunkl of Brníčko
- Vítkovci
- Vlašim
- Vršovci
- Waldstein
- Wratislaw of Mitrovice
- Zajíc of Hazmburk
- Zedtwitz
- Zierotin

== Gallery ==
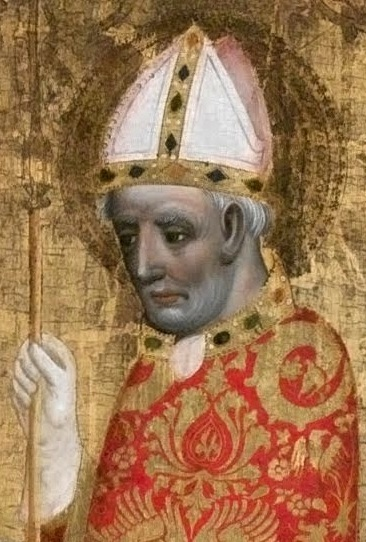
Saint Adalbert (c. 956–997), the second bishop of Prague and later a missionary among the Prussians is for his life and deeds honoured as a patron saint of three countries

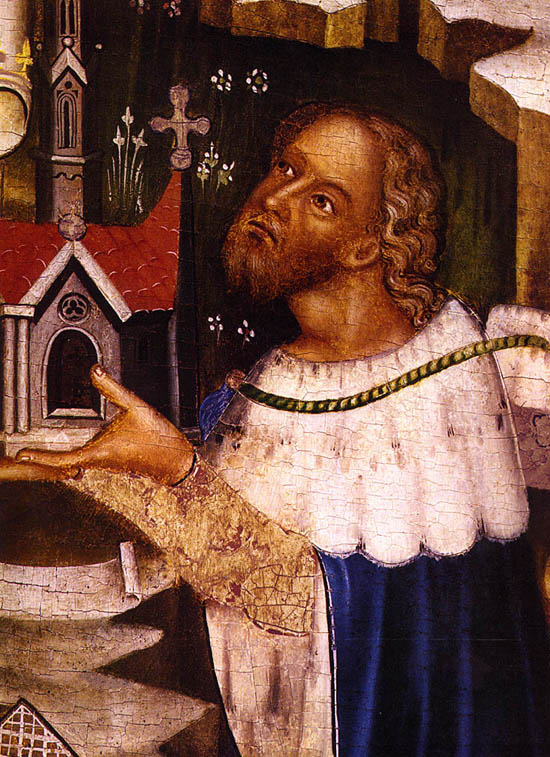
Peter I of Rosenberg (?–1347), important politician and philanthropist, associated with the Book of Rosenberg, the oldest legal publication written in Czech

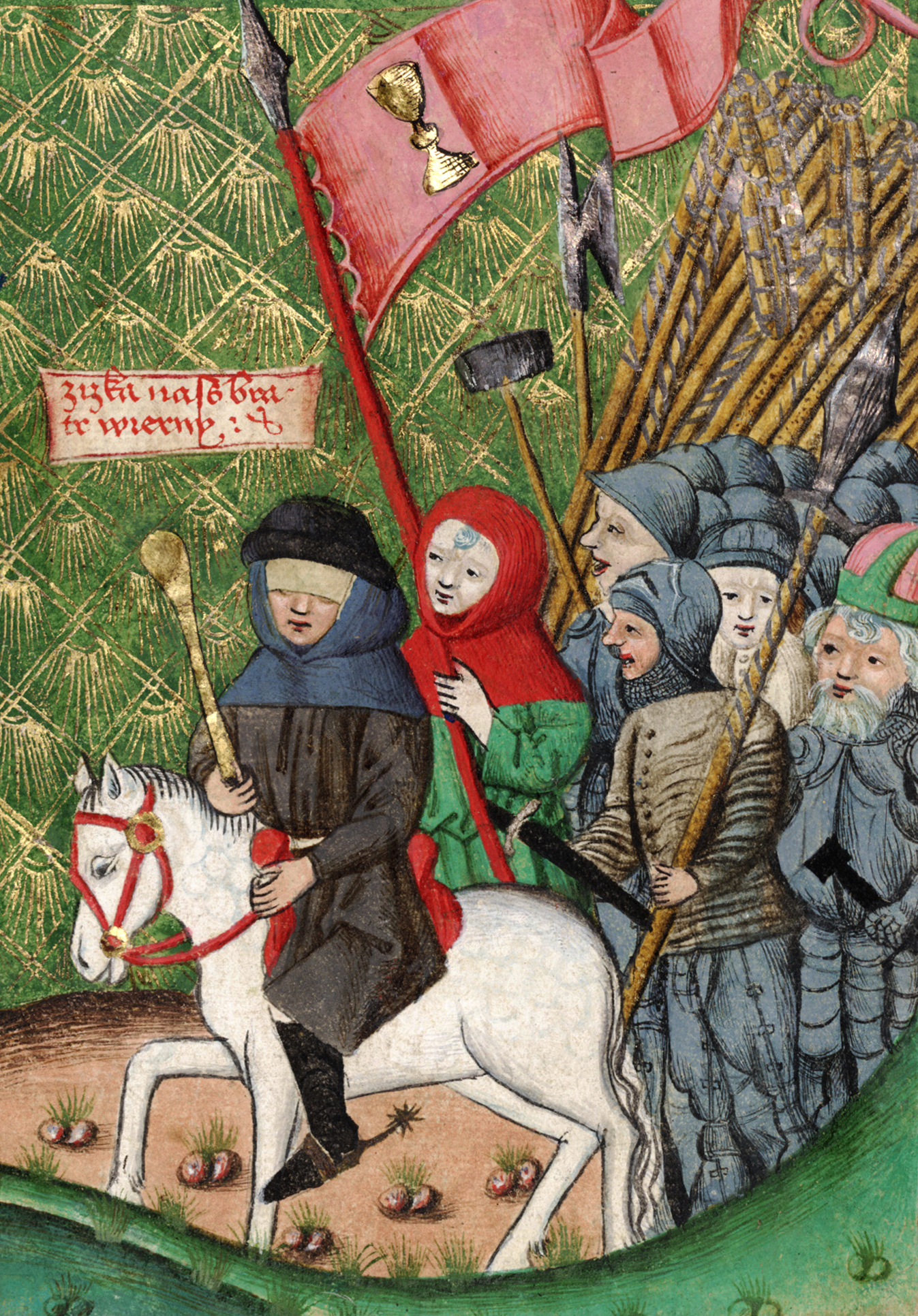
Jan Žižka of Trocnov and Kalich (c. 1360–1424), a small yeoman, later main commander of Hussite troops who thanks to his innovative tactics, although blind, didn't lose a single battle

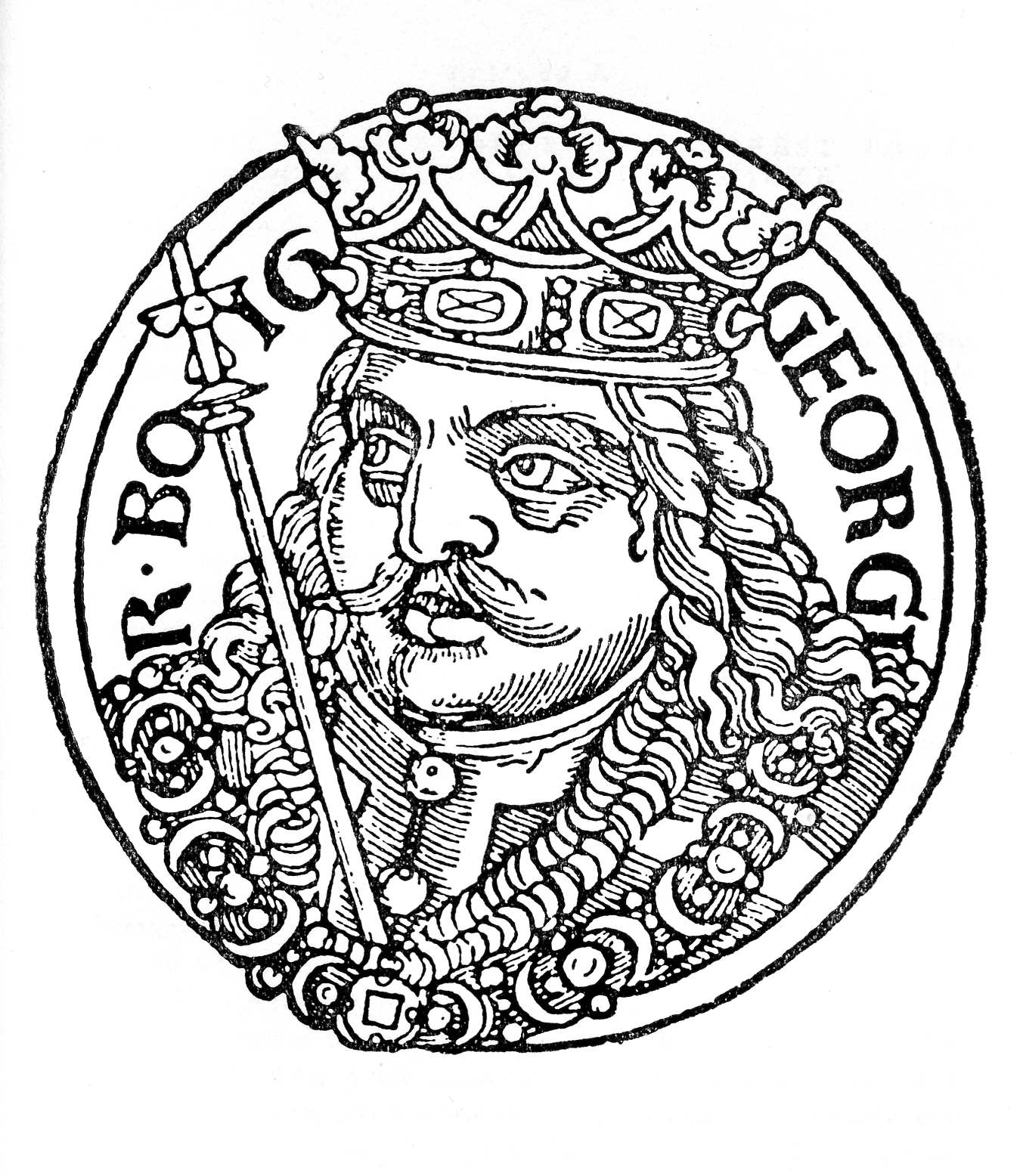
George of Kunštát and Poděbrady (1420–1471), the only Bohemian lord who managed to gain the royal rank (via election), remembered especially for his proposal to create peaceful all-European union of Christian states

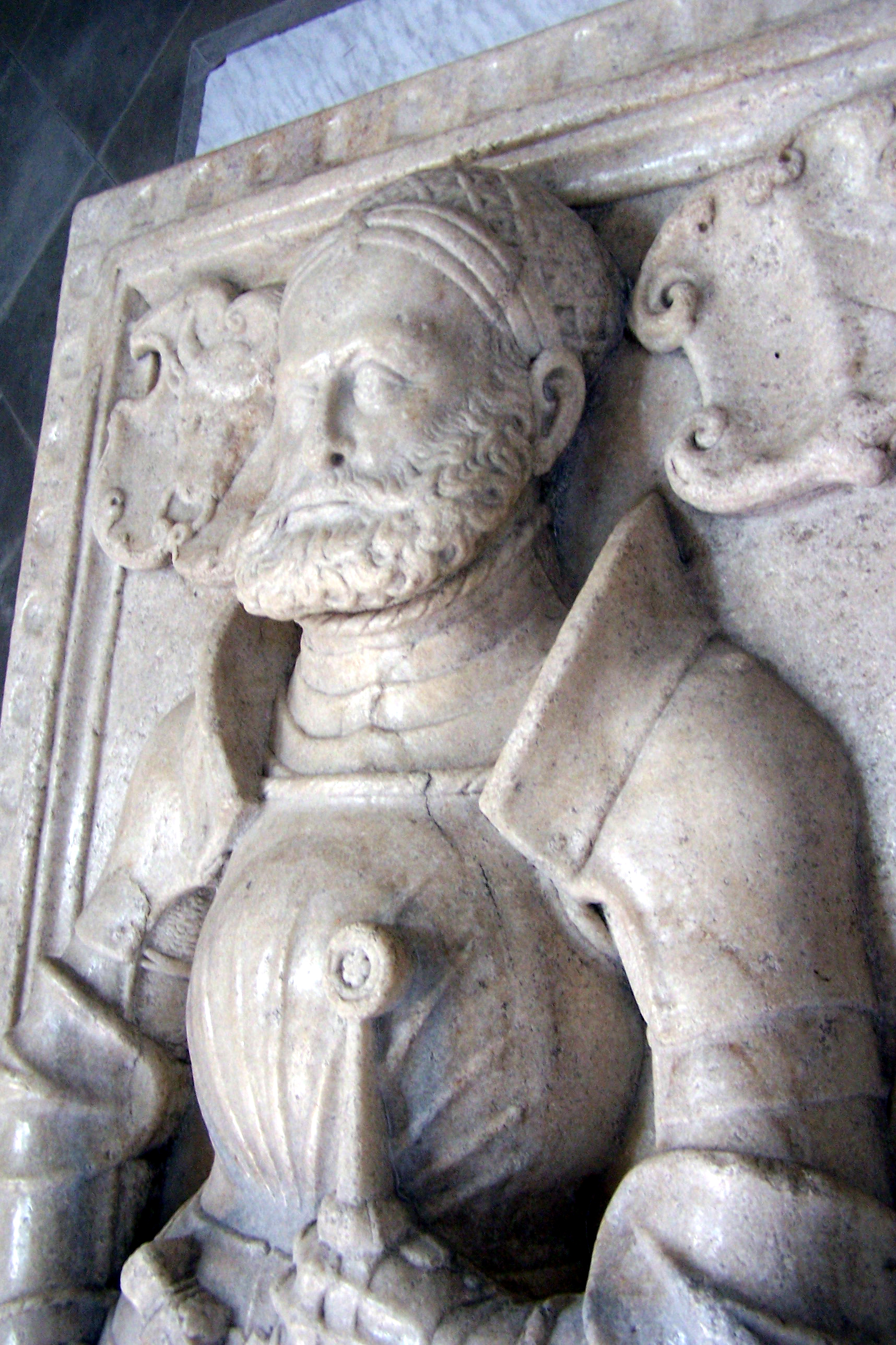
Vojtěch I of Pernštejn (1490–1534), aristocratic magnate and supreme court master

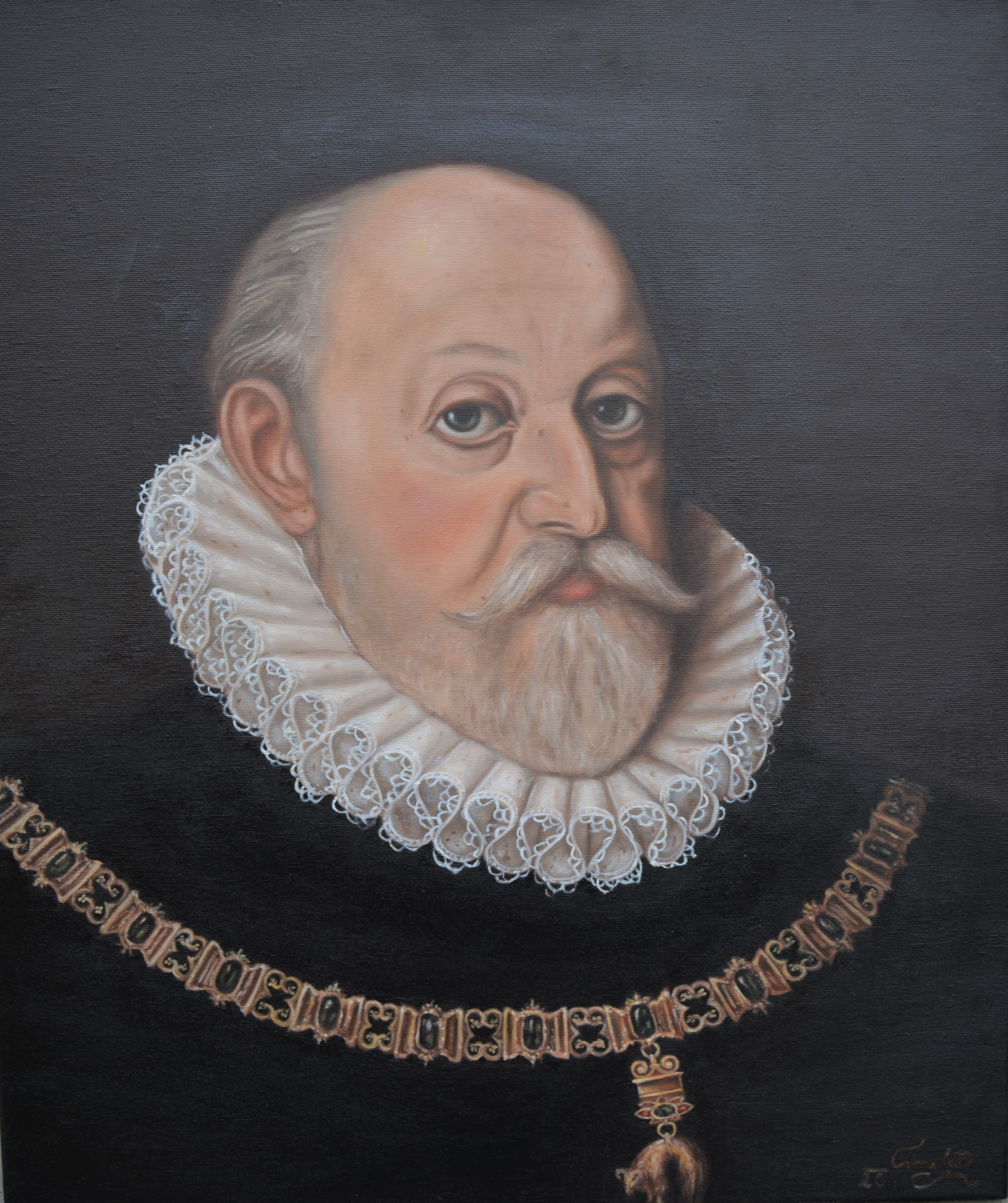
William of Rosenberg (1535–1592), an important statesman and philanthropist, a moderate representative of the Catholic nobility in the period before the Thirty Years' War

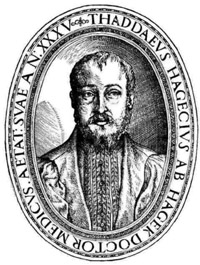
Hagecius (1525–1600), astronomer, naturalist and personal physician of Emperor Rudolph II, who invited Brahe and Kepler at Prague to scientific collaboration

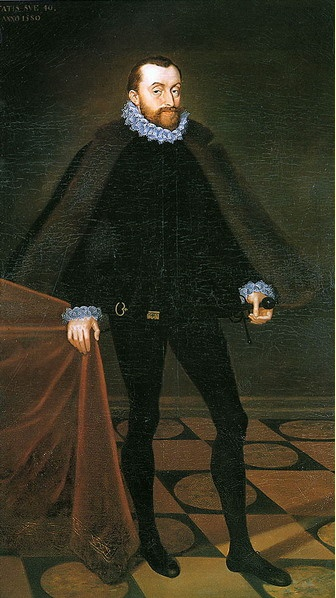
Petr Vok of Rosenberg (1539–1611), the last descendant of powerful and wealth "viceroyal" Rosenberg family, benefactor of the oldest Protestant church Unity of the Brethren

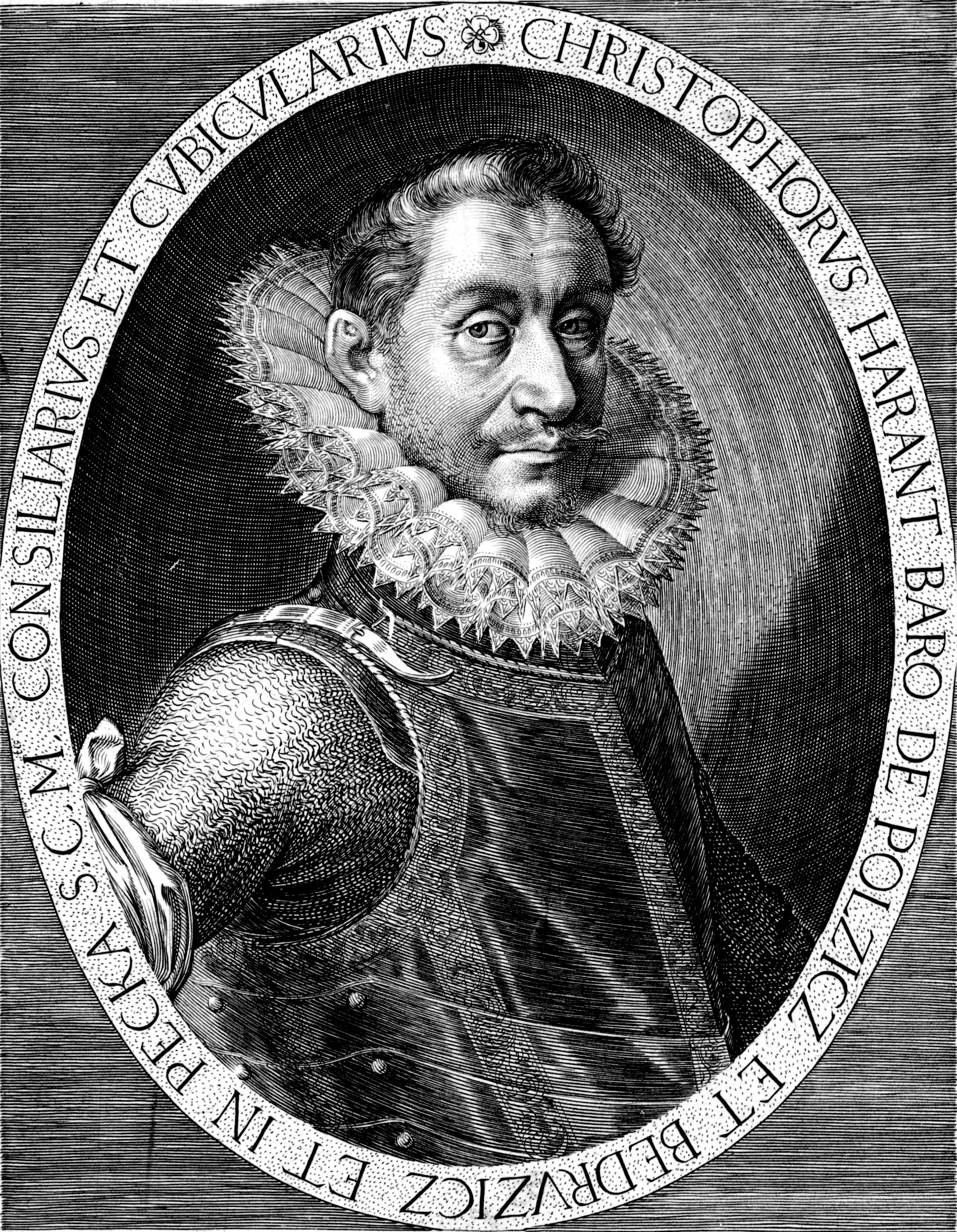
Kryštof Harant of Polžice and Bezdružice (1564–1621), writer, military leader, diplomat, traveler and composer, one of the leaders of the Estates Protestant uprising of 1618, executed after the Catholic victory in the Battle of White Mountain

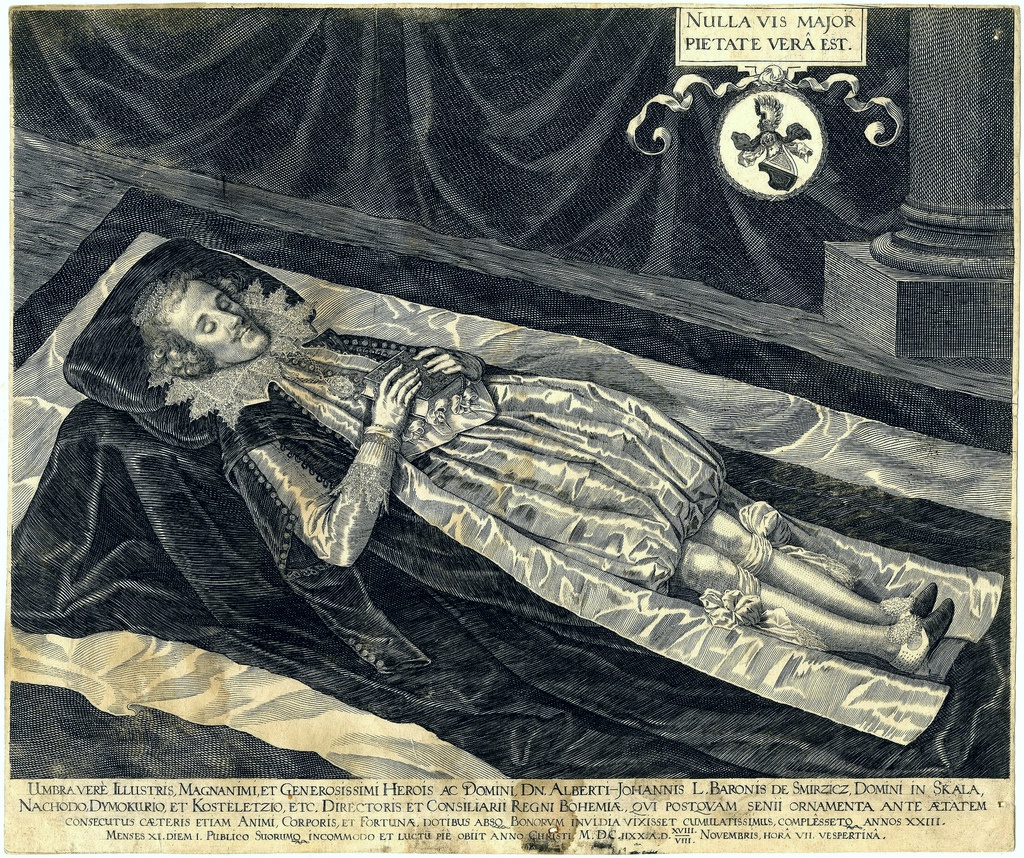
Albrecht Jan Smiřický of Smiřice (1594–1618), the wealthiest lord of its era, possible candidate to the Bohemian throne and one of main heads of the anti-Habsburg Bohemian Revolt

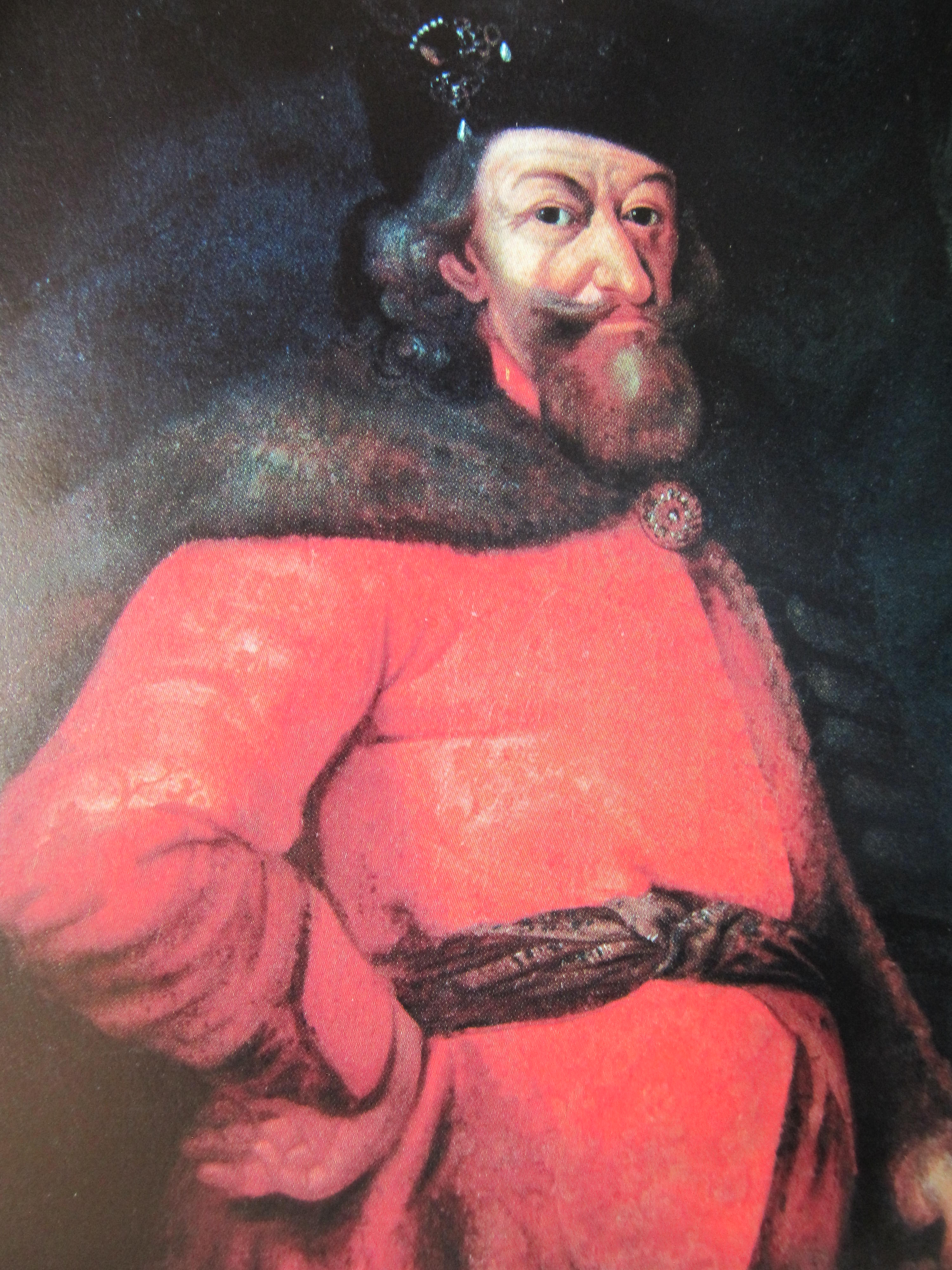
Heřman Czernin of Chudenice (1576–1651), traveler, diplomat and politician, highest provincial court master and chamberlain

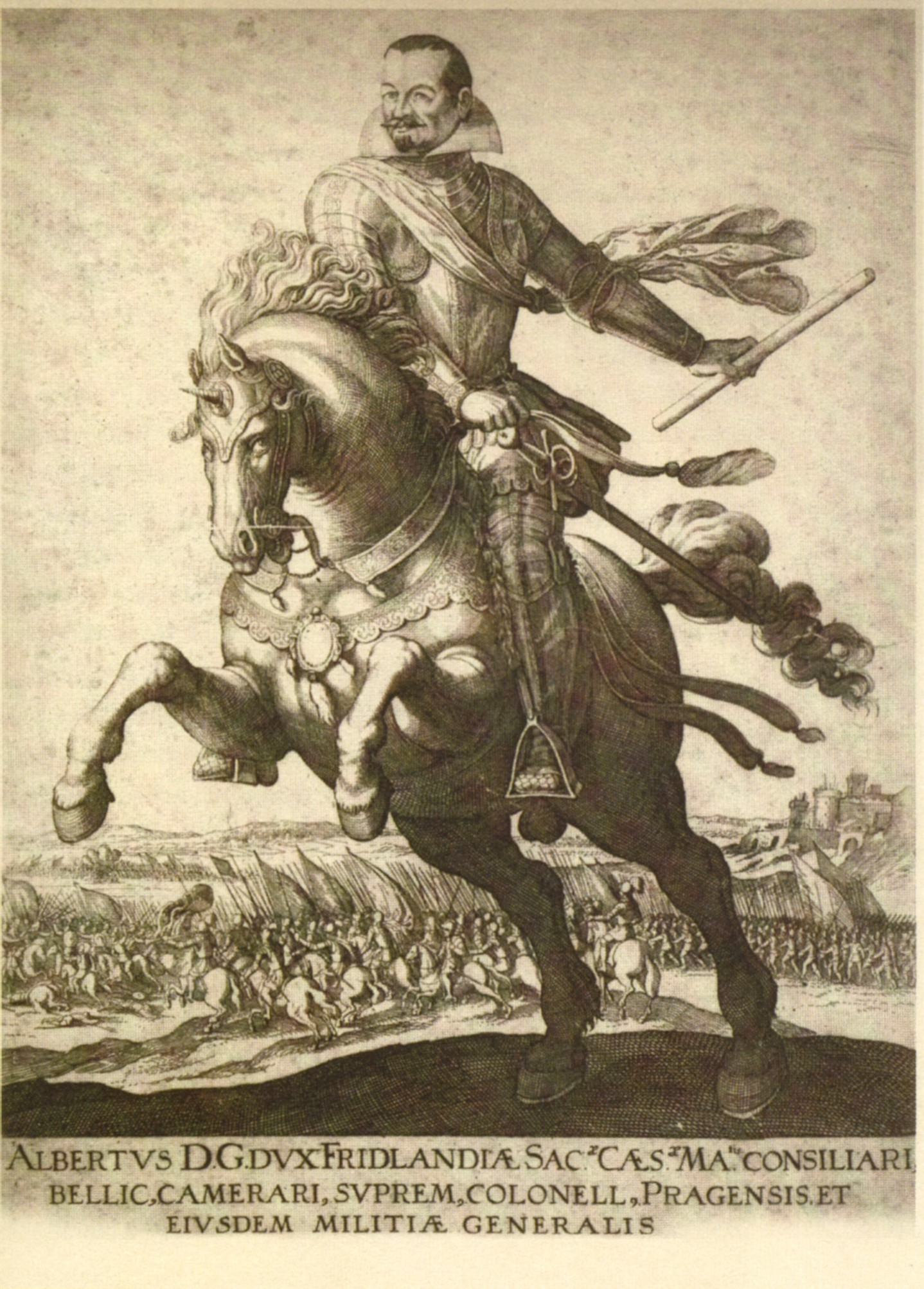
Albrecht Václav von Wallenstein (1583–1634), famous military leader and politician during the Thirty Years War, the first holder of title generalissimo in history

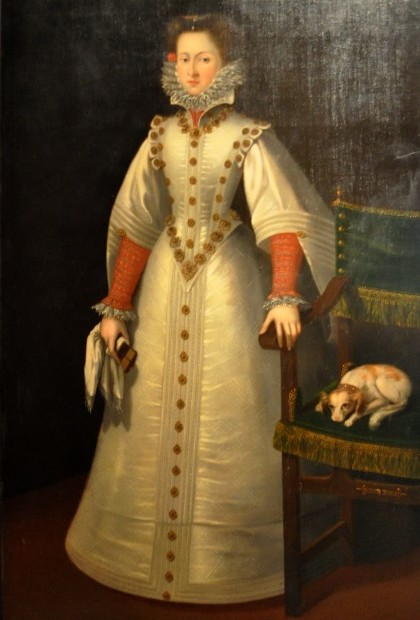
Polyxena of Lobkowicz (1566–1642), née Pernštejn, most powerful and influential noblewoman of Early Modern Age in Czech history, her political engagement and intrigues have greatly helped forcible re-Catholization of Bohemia after 1620

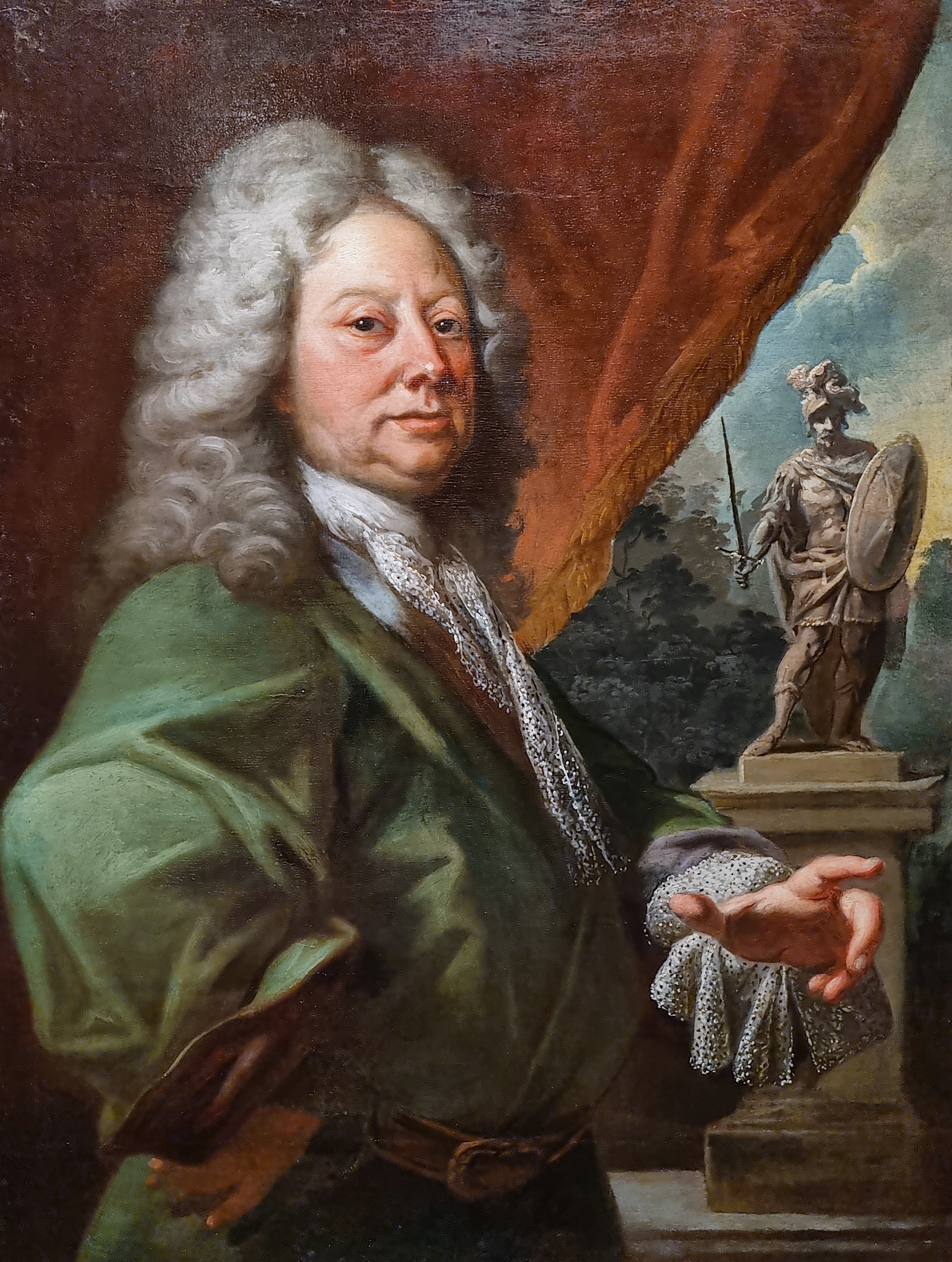
František Antonín Sporck (1662–1738), important benefactor and visionary, founder of the hospital in Kuks

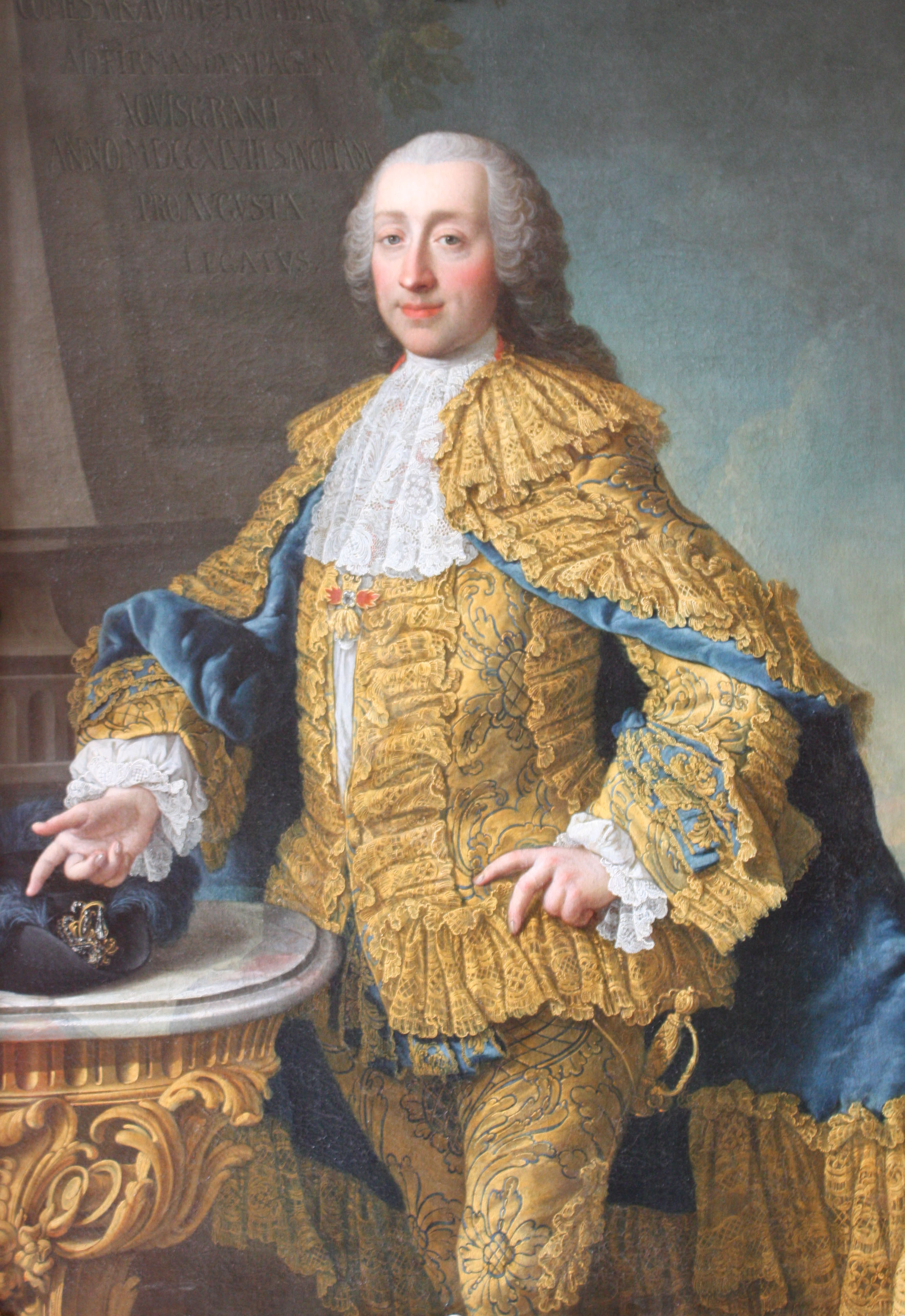
Václav Antonín of Kaunitz-Rietberg (1711–1794), statesman and diplomat, state chancellor of the Habsburg Monarchy, initiator of the Diplomatic Revolution

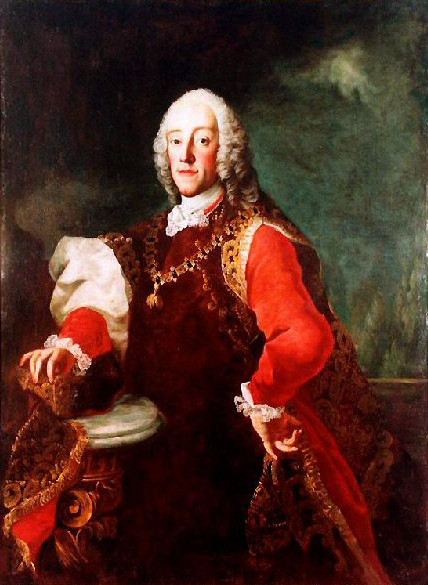
Josef I. Schwarzenberg (1722–1782), politician and philanthropist, founder of the Schwarzenberg Pension Institute for Employees

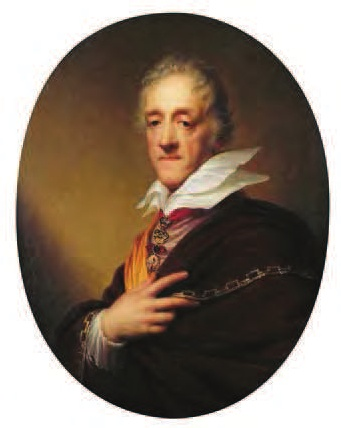
Jan Rudolf Czernin of Chudenice (1757–1845), patron and art collector, president of the Academy of Sciences, supreme chamber and hofmeister

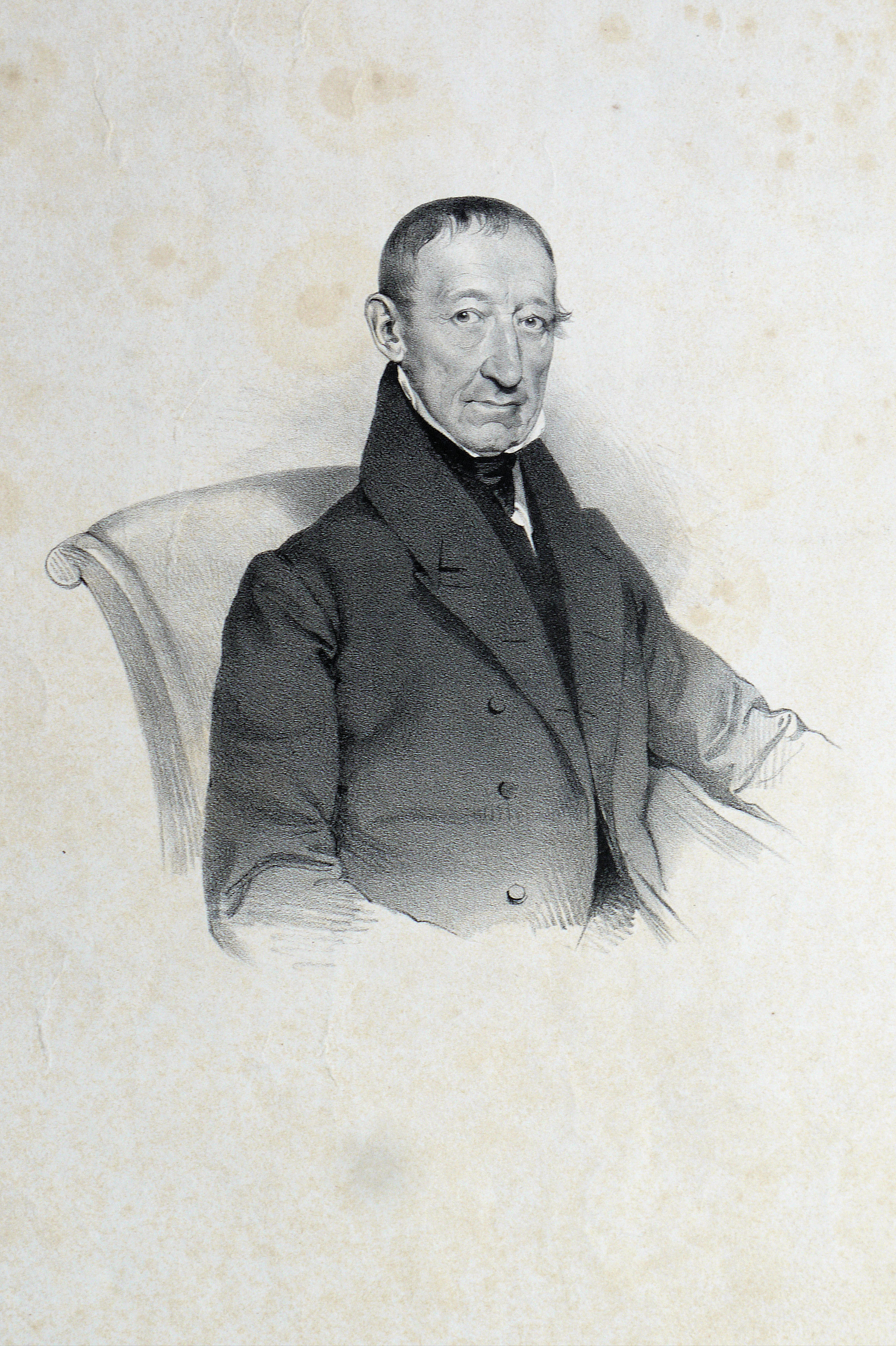
Kašpar Maria of Sternberg (1761–1838), botanist, geologist, paleobotanist and founder of the Bohemian National Museum in Prague (1818)

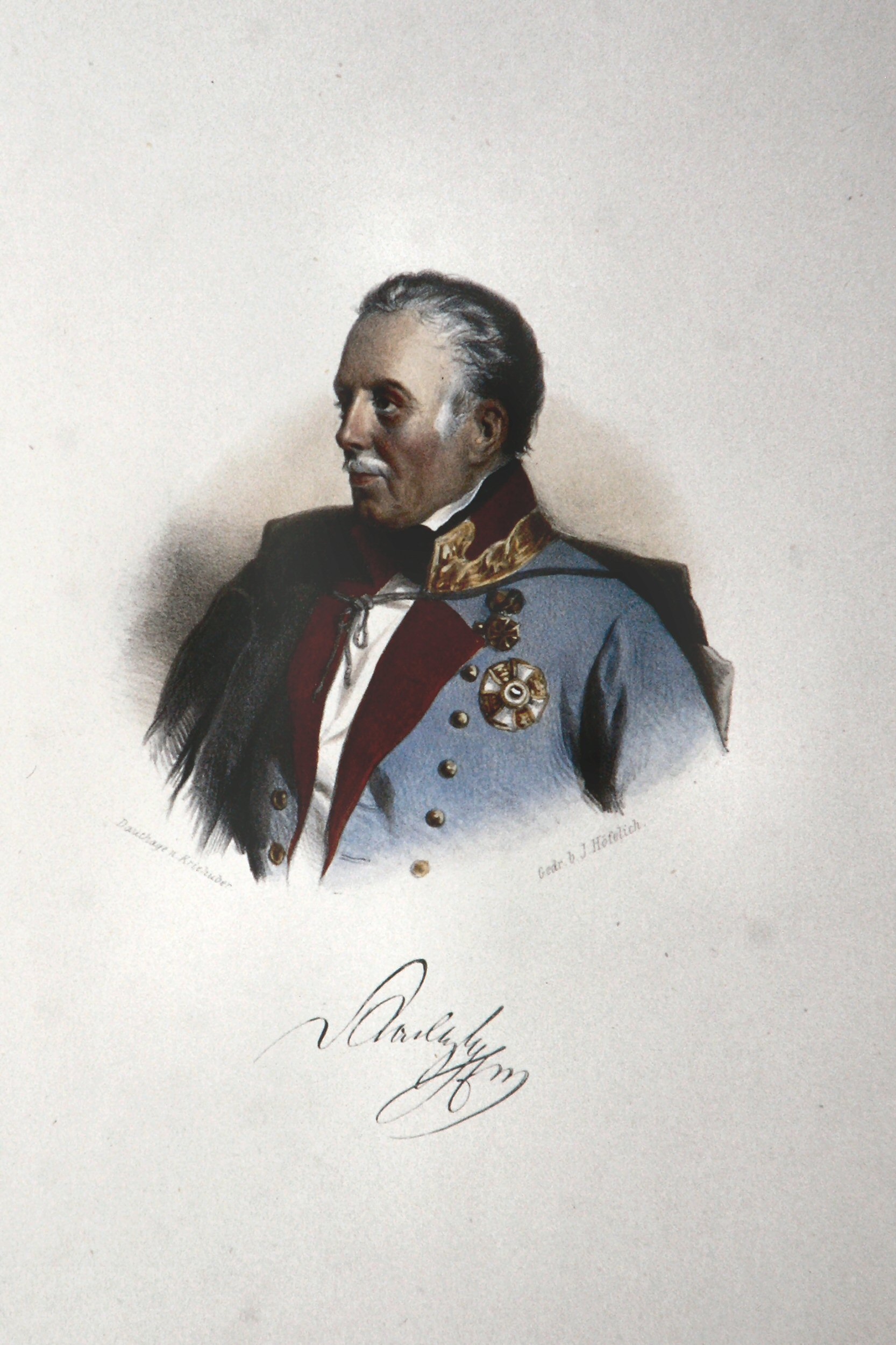
Josef Václav Radetzky von Radetz (1766–1858), Austrian field marshal and viceroy of Lombardy–Venetia, called the "Saviour of the House of Habsburg" during the revolution year of 1848 in Italy

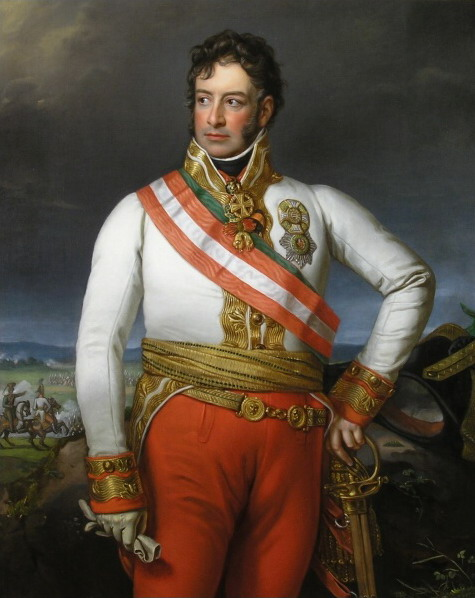
Karl Filip Schwarzenberg (1771–1820), diplomat and military leader, victor over Napoleon in the Battle of Leipzig

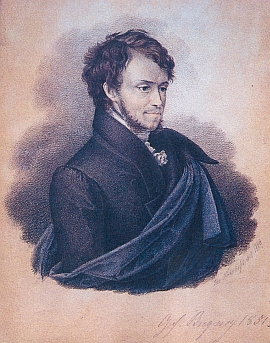
Jiří Buquoy de Longueval (1781–1851), economist, writer, politician, businessman, inventor, founder of the first nature reserve in Bohemia

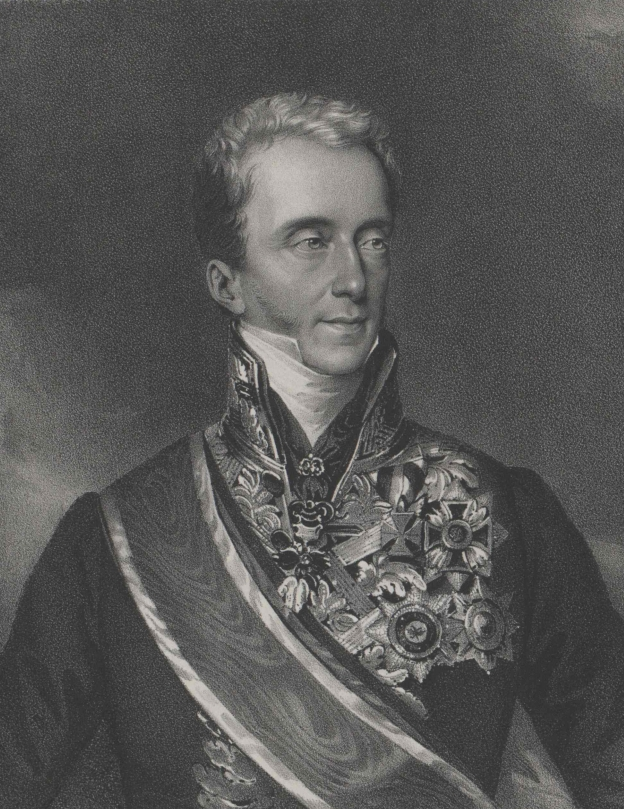
František Antonín Kolovrat (1778–1861), politician, prime minister

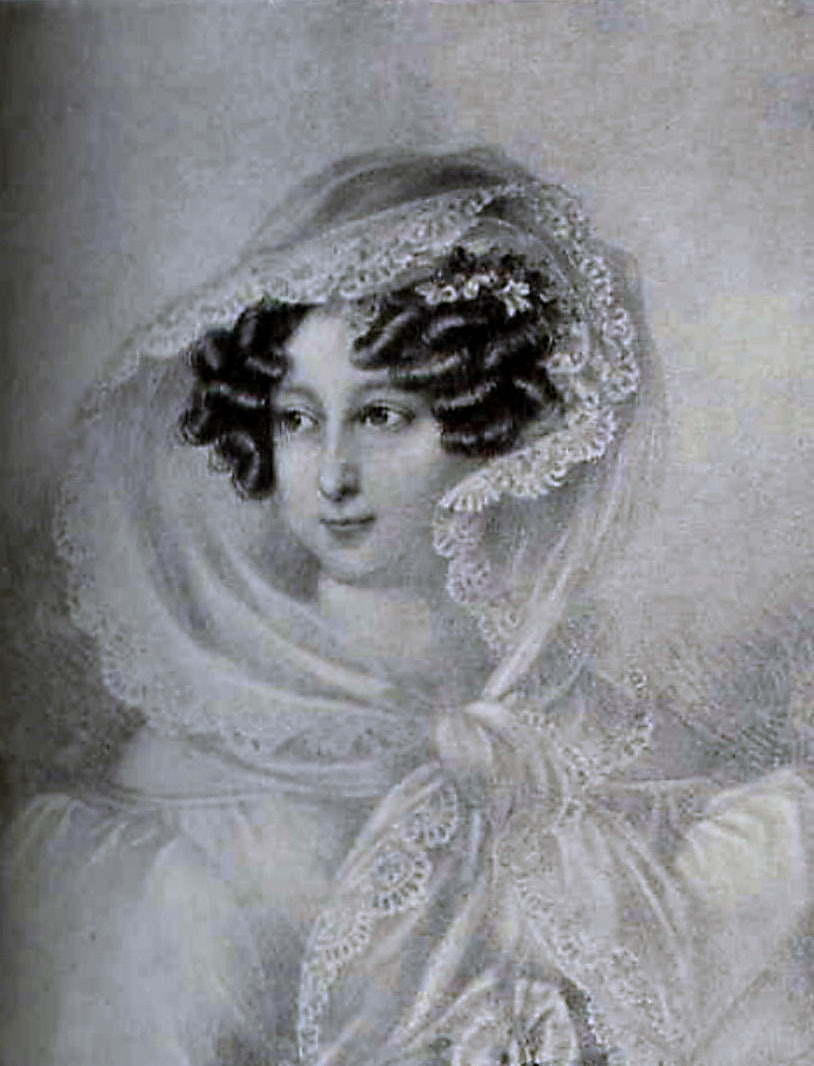
Vilemína Zaháňská von Sagan (1781–1839), salon owner, writer, supporter of the writer Božena Němcová

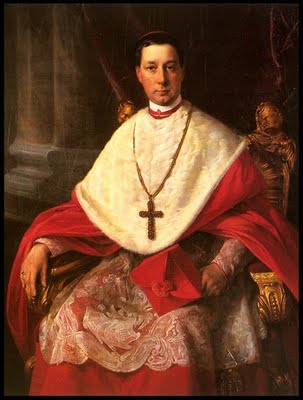
Cardinal Bedřich Schwarzenberg (1809–1885), Archbishop of Salzburg and Prague, theologian, mountaineer, public figure, initiator of the completion of the St. Vitus Cathedral at Prague Castle

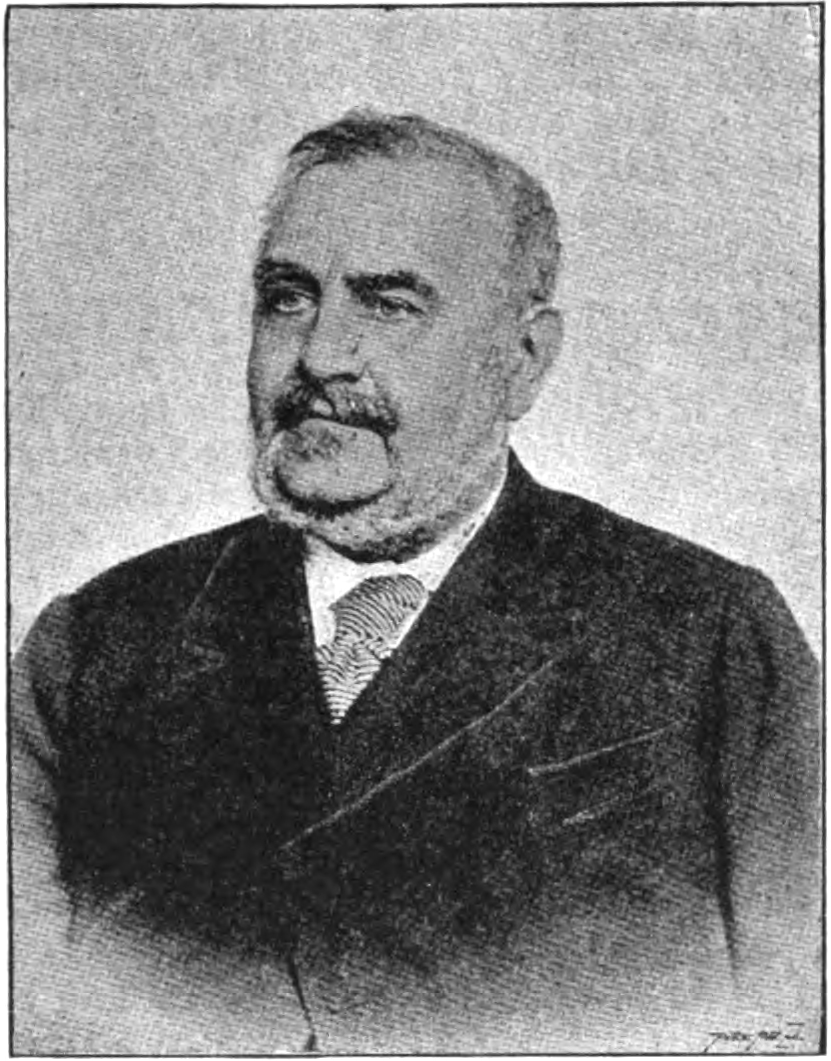
František Ladislav Rieger (1818–1903), politician, co-founder of the National Party, knighted for his merits

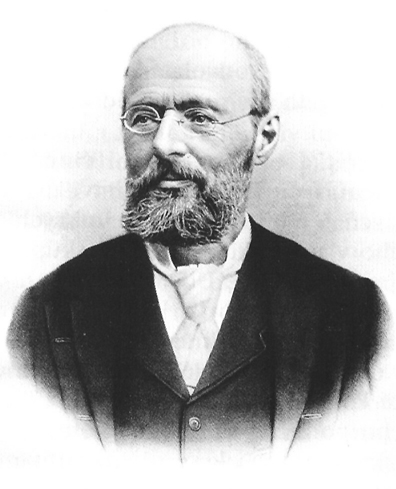
Emil Škoda (1839–1900), entrepreneur and engineer, founder of Škoda Works – one of the largest European industrial conglomerates of the 20th c., knighted for his merits

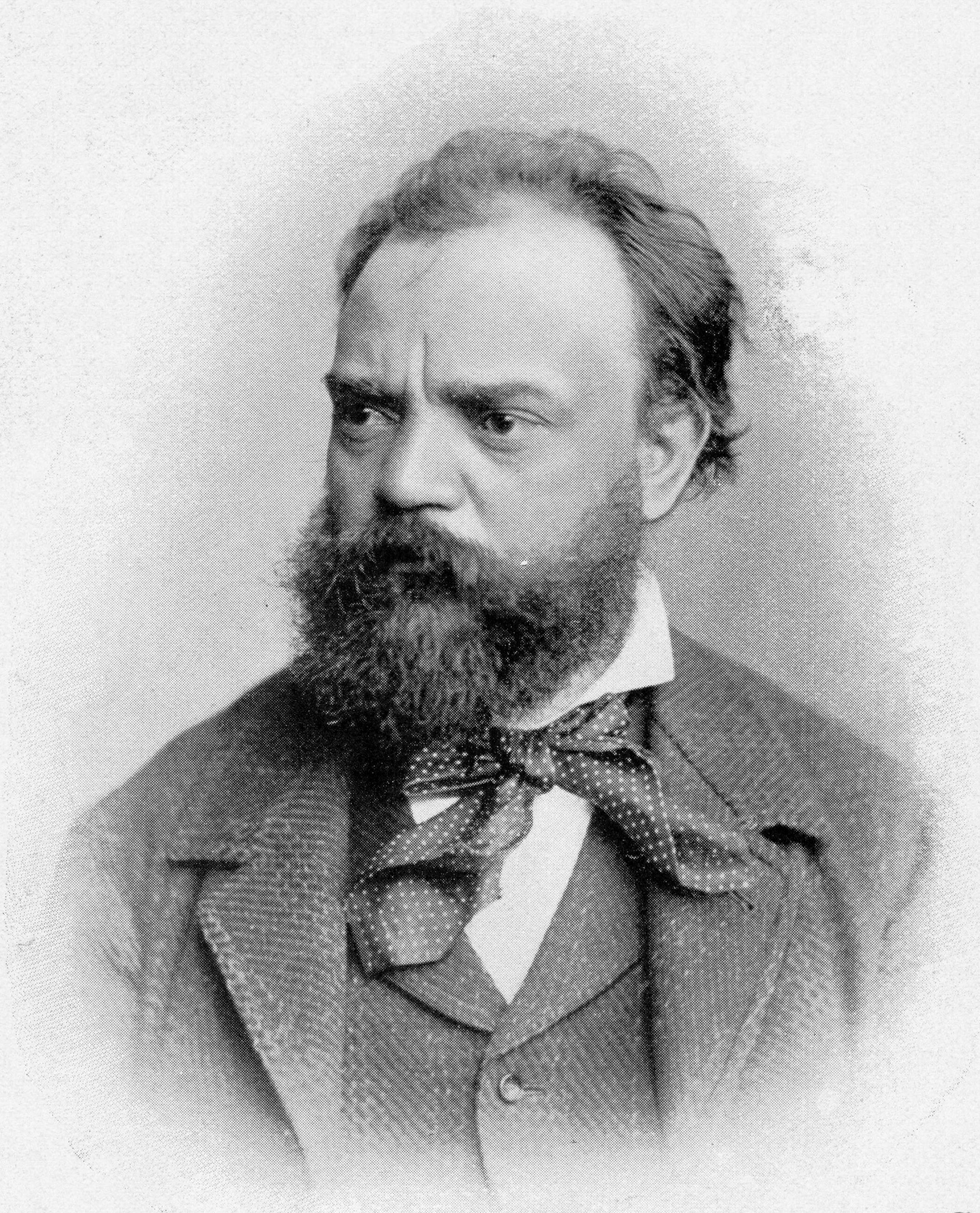
Antonín Dvořák (1841–1904), one of the most important Czech and European music composers, knighted for his merits

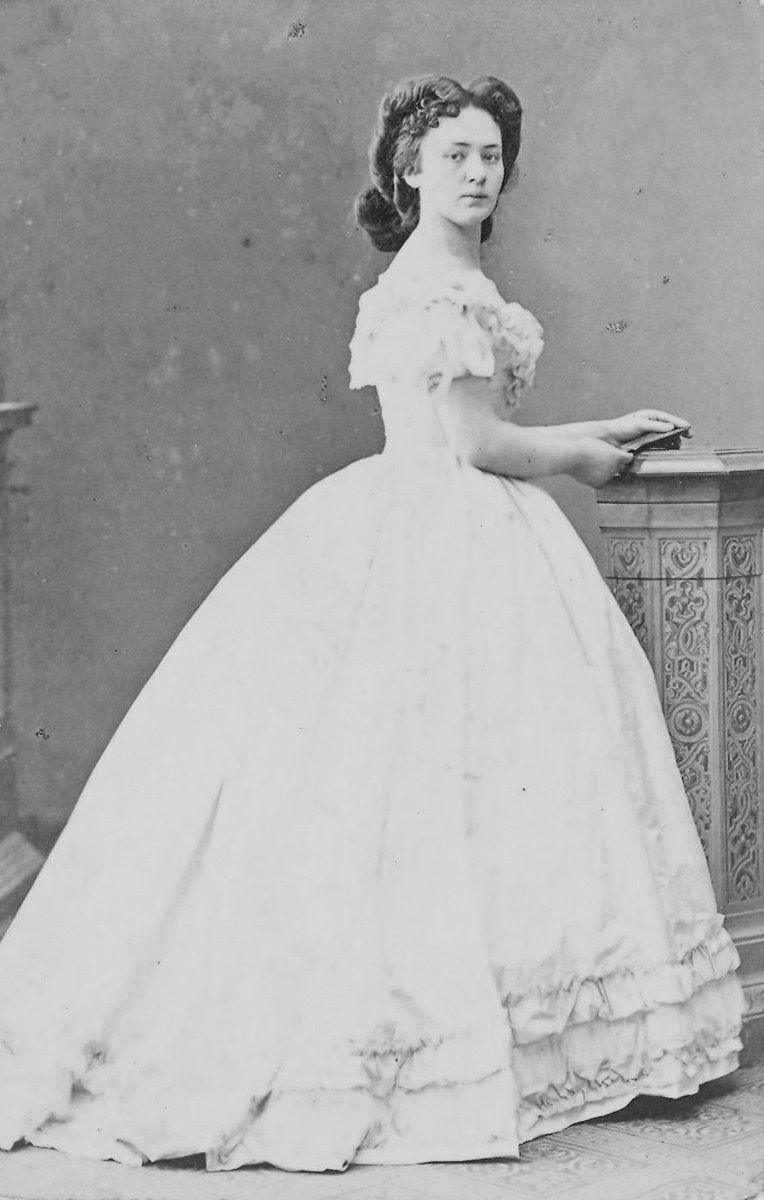
Bertha von Suttner (1843–1914), née Kinsky, peace activist and writer, the first woman awarded the Nobel Peace Prize (1905) and probably the most known noblewoman of Bohemian origin

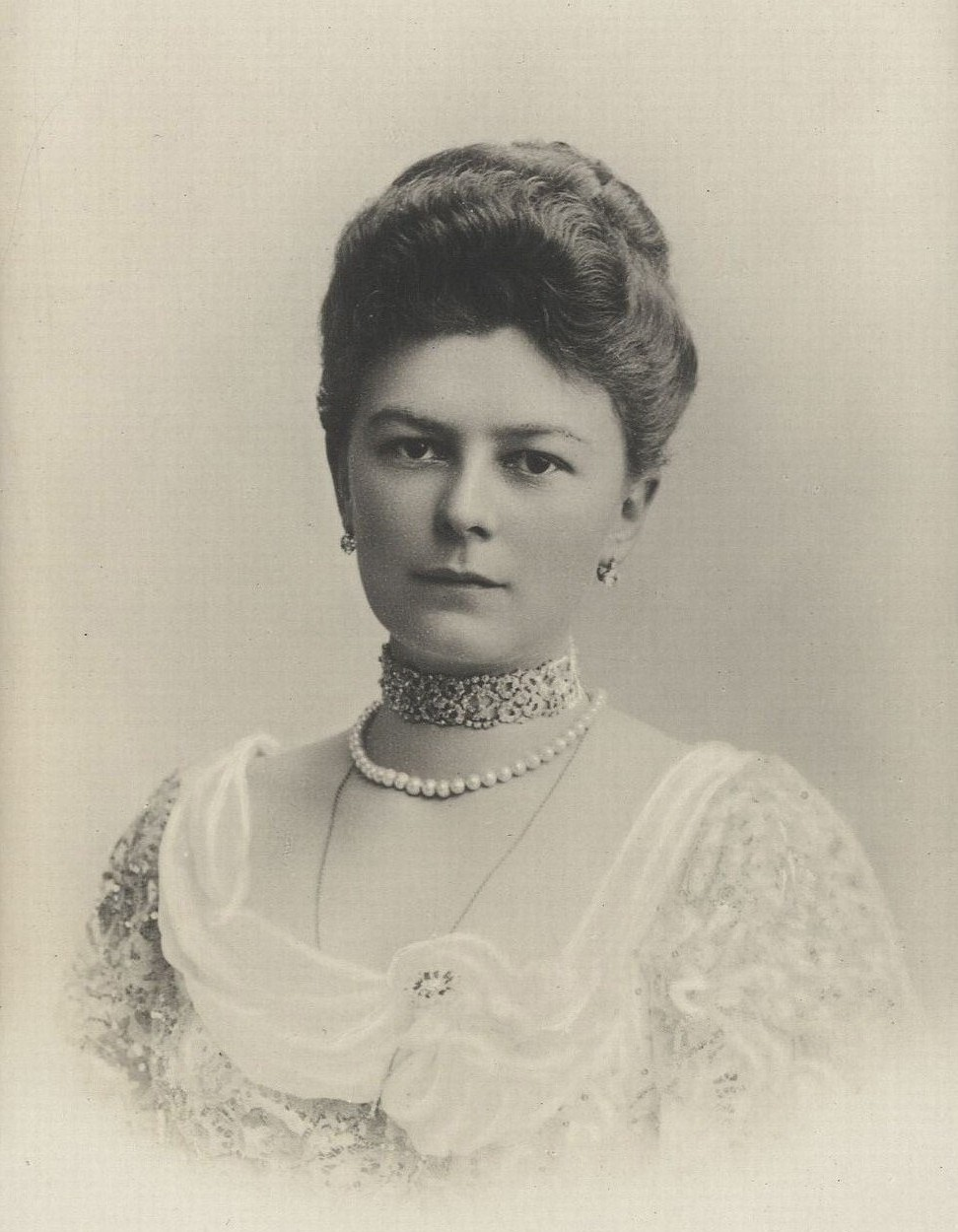
Žofie Chotková (Sophie, Duchess of Hohenberg) (1868–1914), wife of the heir to the Austrian throne Archduke Franz Ferdinand of Austria, assassinated in Sarajevo in 1914

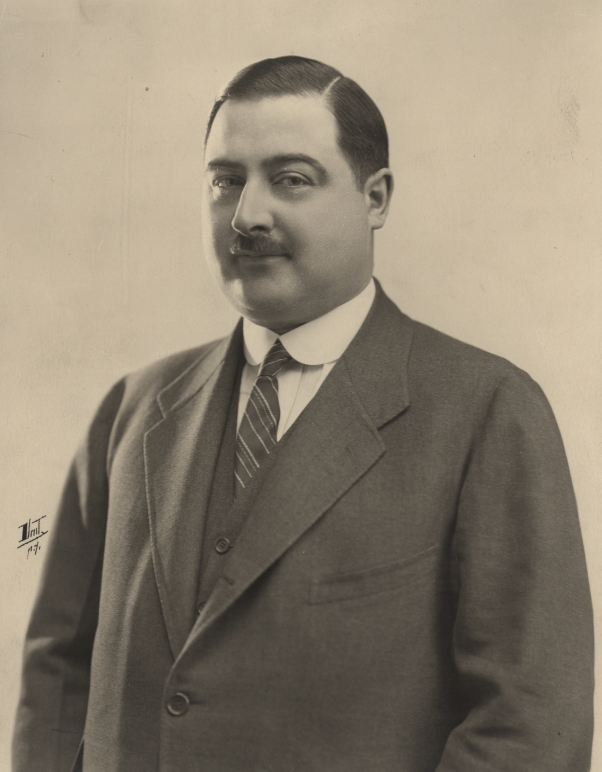
Alexander Kolowrat - Krakowský (1886–1927), car racer, aviator, owner of film studios and co-owner of the Laurin & Klement car company

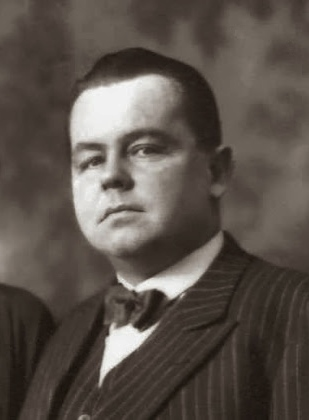
Adolf Schwarzenberg (1890–1950), businessman, anti-Nazi

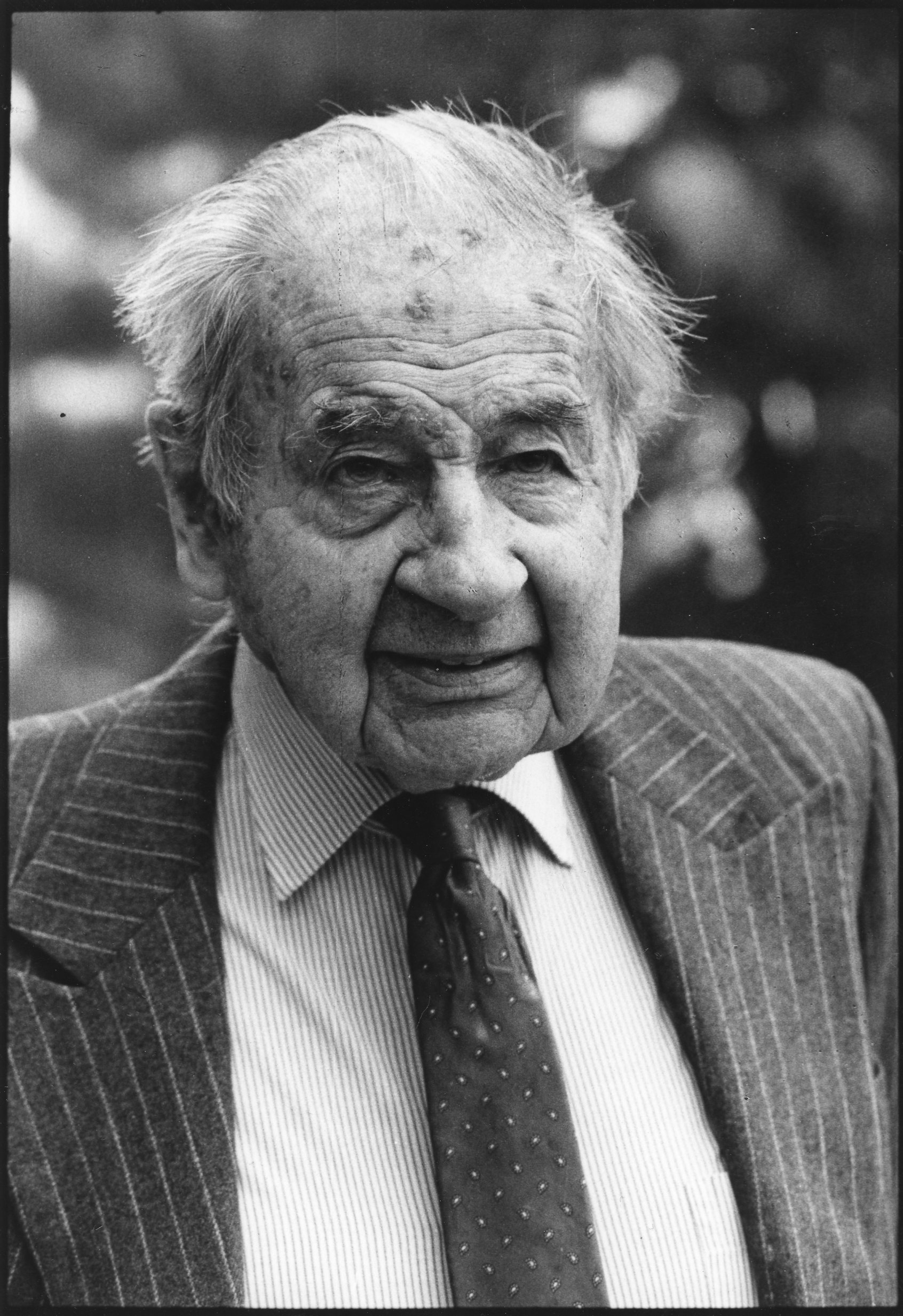
Jindřich Kolowrat-Krakowský (1897–1996), diplomat, politician, philanthropist, anti-Nazi

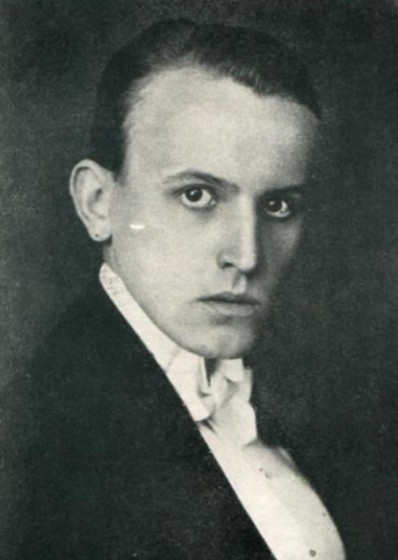
Zdeněk Bořek Dohalský (1900–1945), journalist and anti-Nazi resistance fighter, executed by the Nazis in 1945

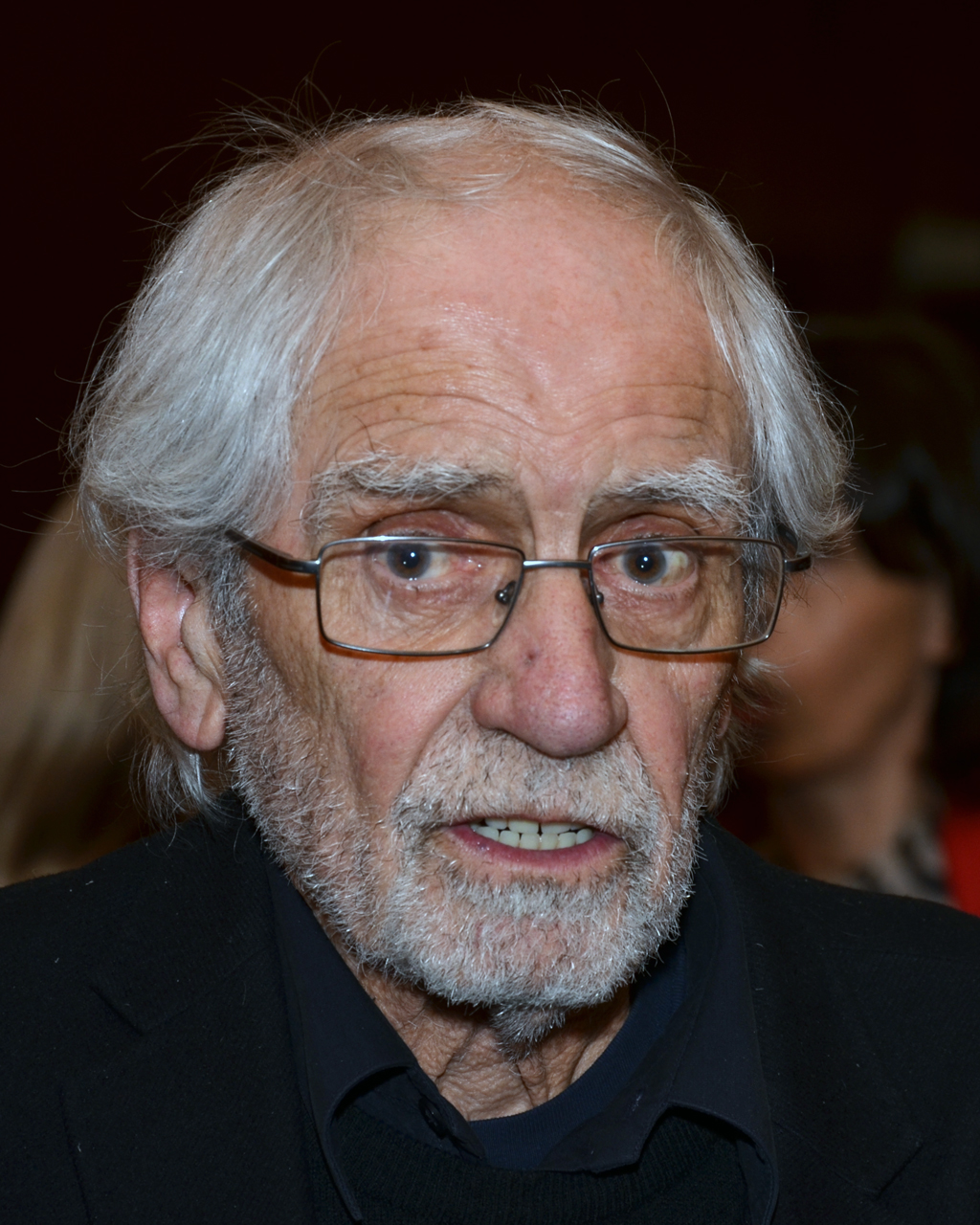
Jiří Stránský (1931–2019), writer, screenwriter, translator

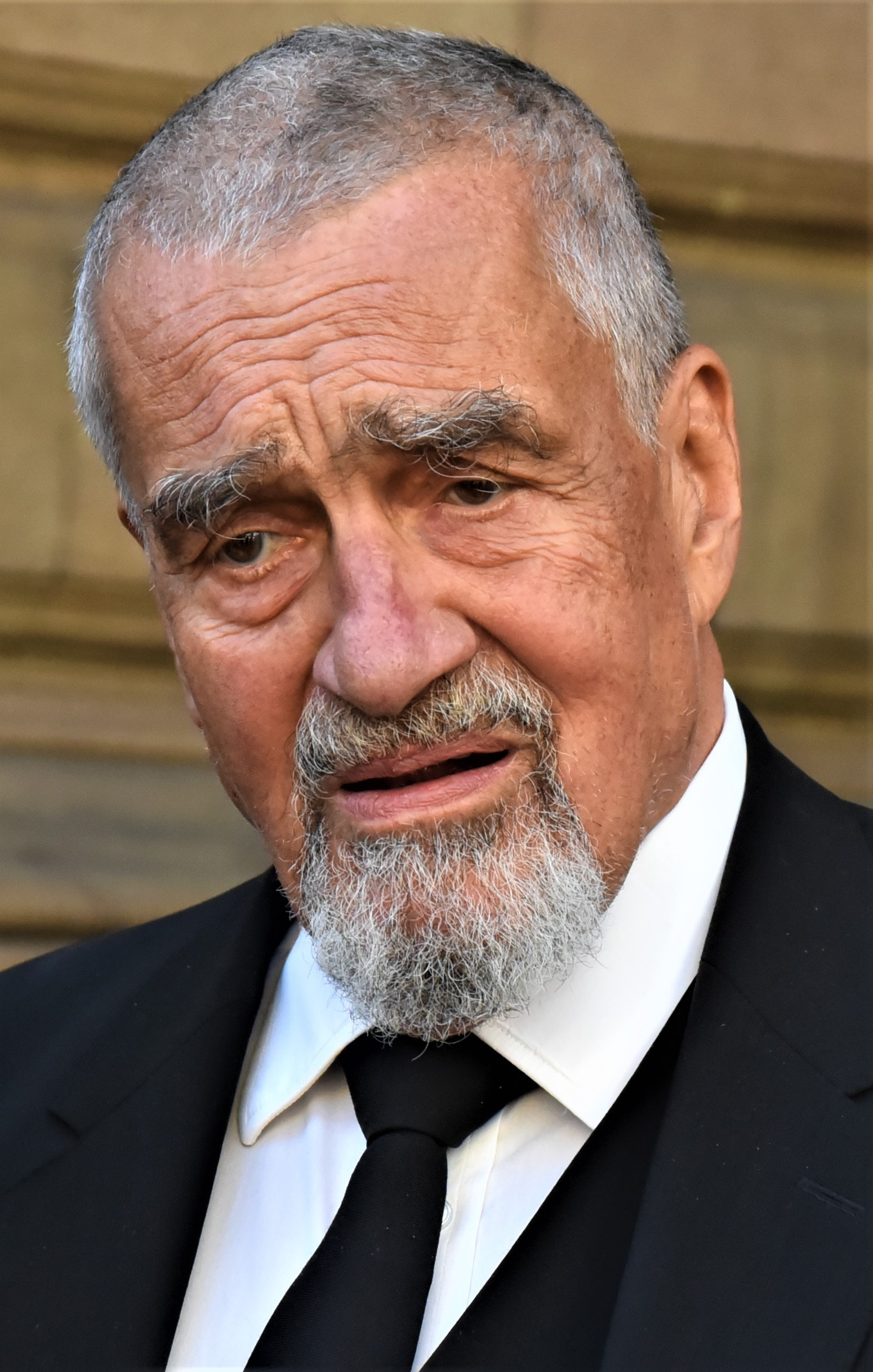
Karel Schwarzenberg (1937–2023), politician, businessman, philanthropist and fighter for human rights

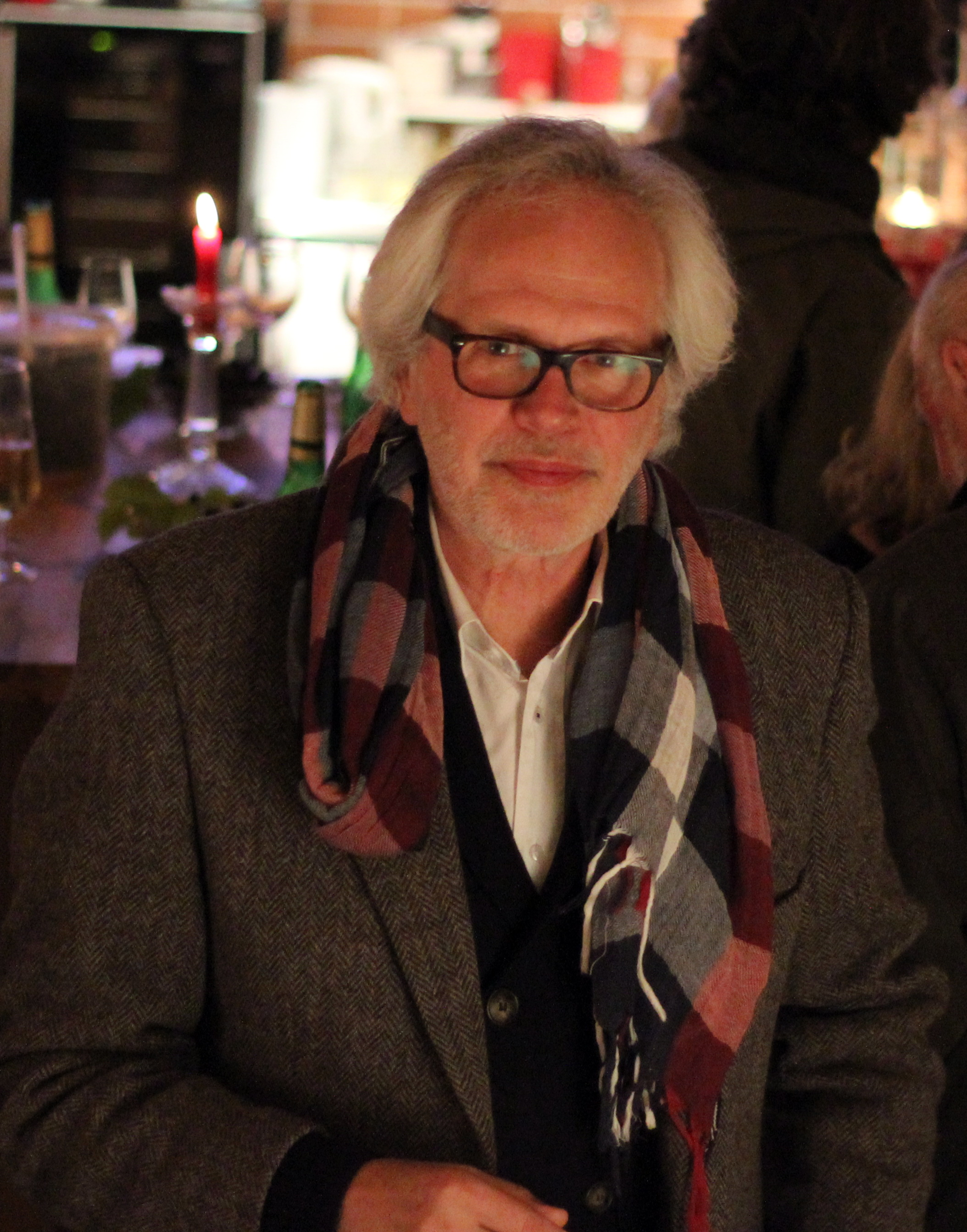
František Kinský (born 1947), producer, moderator and regional politician

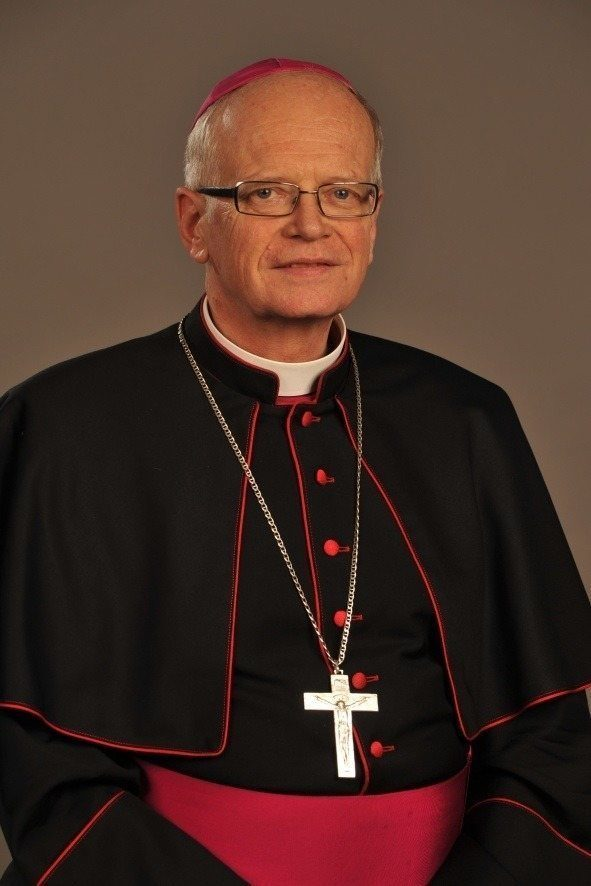
František Václav Lobkowicz (1948–2022), Roman Catholic priest, bishop of Ostrava-Opava

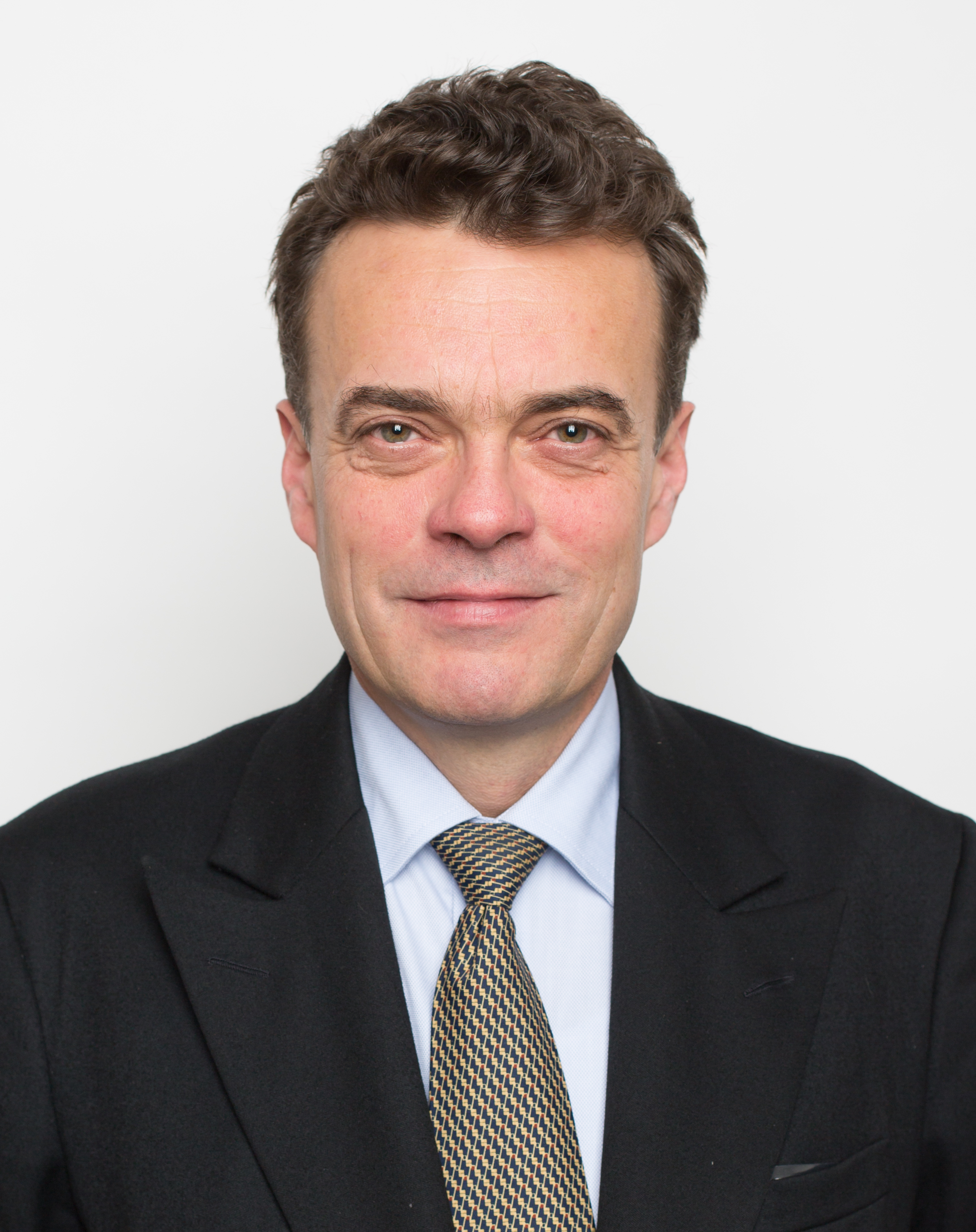
Tomáš Czernin (born 1962), businessman and politician, senator
