= Kamenický of Kamenice =

Czech noble family originating from the Margraviate of Moravia

Kamenický of Kamenice Kameničtí z Kamenice, sg. Kamenický Kameniczky von Kamenicz
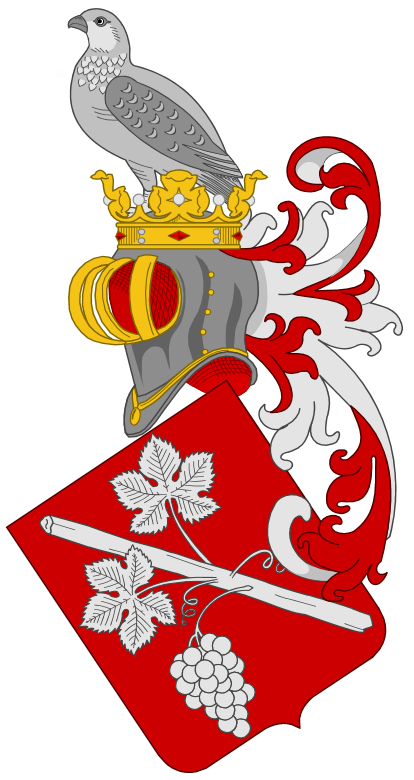
- Kamenický family's coat of arms according to Král von Dobrá Voda.
- Country: Czech Republic
- Etymology: Kamenice
- Origin: Margraviate of Moravia
- Founded: 15th century

Kamenicky [ˈkamɛɲiːt͡ski](Kameničtí z Kamenice, sg. Kamenický in Czech; German: Kameniczky von Kamenicz is a Czech noble family (uradel) originating from the Margraviate of Moravia. The family has been known since the 15th century. The name derives from the family's ancestral seat Kamenice in Moravia. Original seal from the year 1571 depicting the coat of arms is deposited in the Franzens museum (Moravské zemské muzeum) in Brno. The coat of arms featuring a sloping wine tendril with two leaves and a bunch of grapes. One family branch got a majesty letter 1587 from the Holy Roman Emperor Rudolf II confirming the knighthood. In addition Kamenicky family is mentioned in the genealogist Bartholomeus Paprocký's work Diadochos published in Prague 1602.

== Bibliography ==
- Edlen von Kadich, Heinrich (1899). Der Mährische Adel (PDF). Nürnberg: Bauer und Raspe.
- von Meraviglia-Crivelli, Rudolf Johann (1886). Der Böhmischer Adel (PDF). Nürnberg: Bauer und Raspe.
- Král von Dobrá Voda, Adalbert (1901). Heraldika, Souhrn pravidel a predpisuv znakovych. Praha-Karlin.
