= Ještěd Tower =

Television transmitter and hotel near Liberec, Czech Republic

- Hotel a televizní vysílač na Ještědu
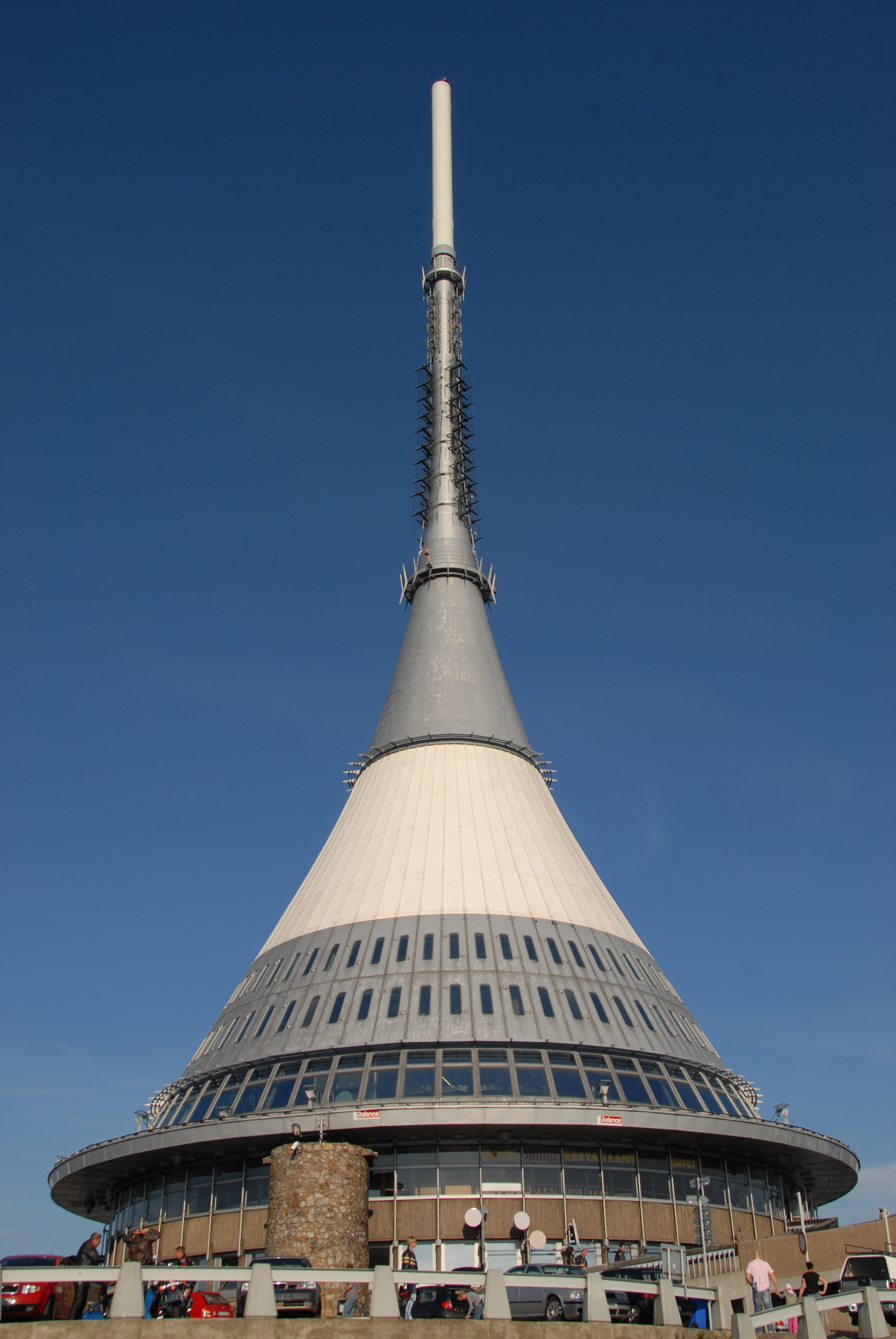

General information
- Location: Ještěd, Liberec, Horní Hanychov 153, Czech Republic
- Coordinates: 50°43′56″N 14°59′07″E
- Completed: 9 July 1973

Website
- Official website

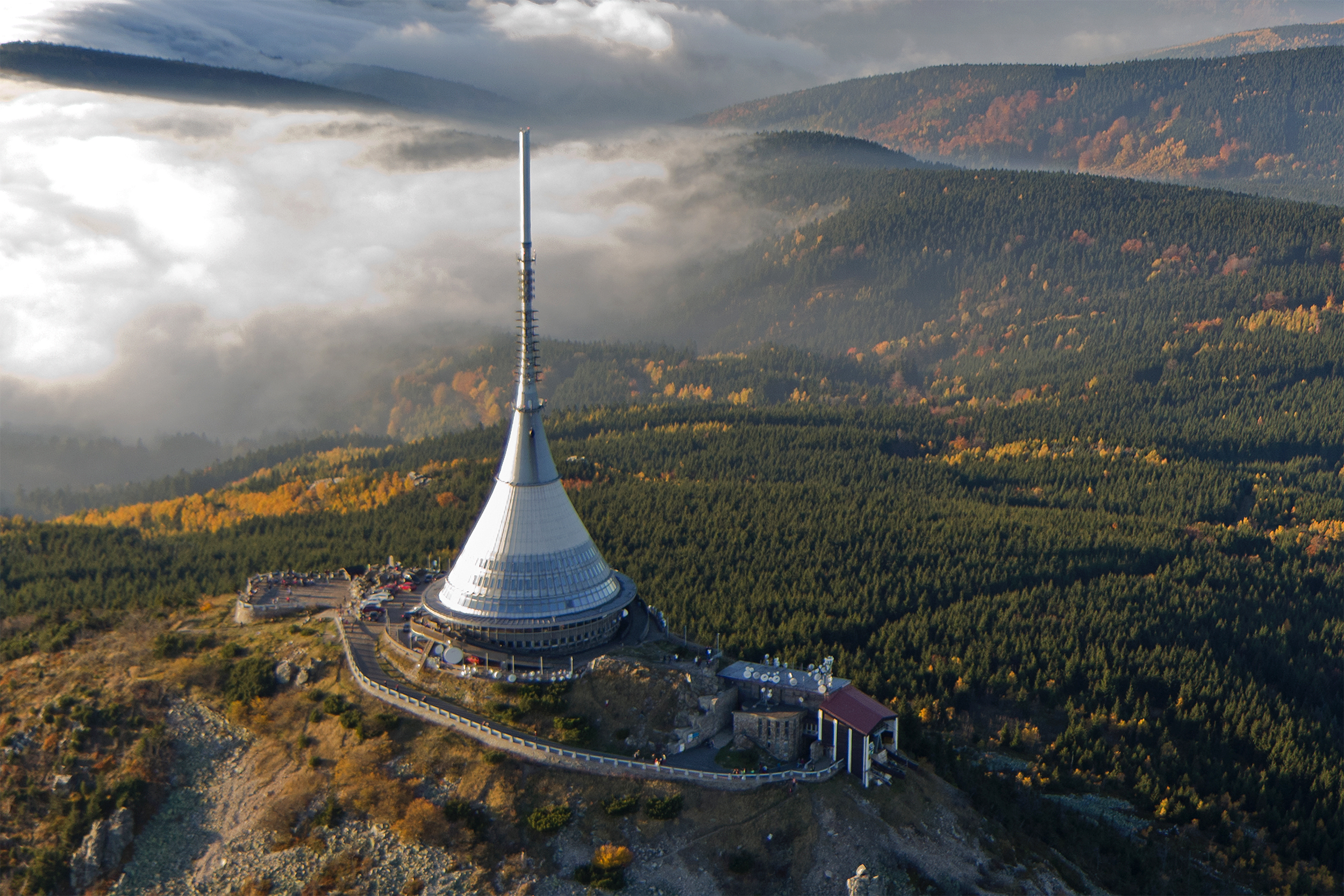
Ještěd mountain with the tower

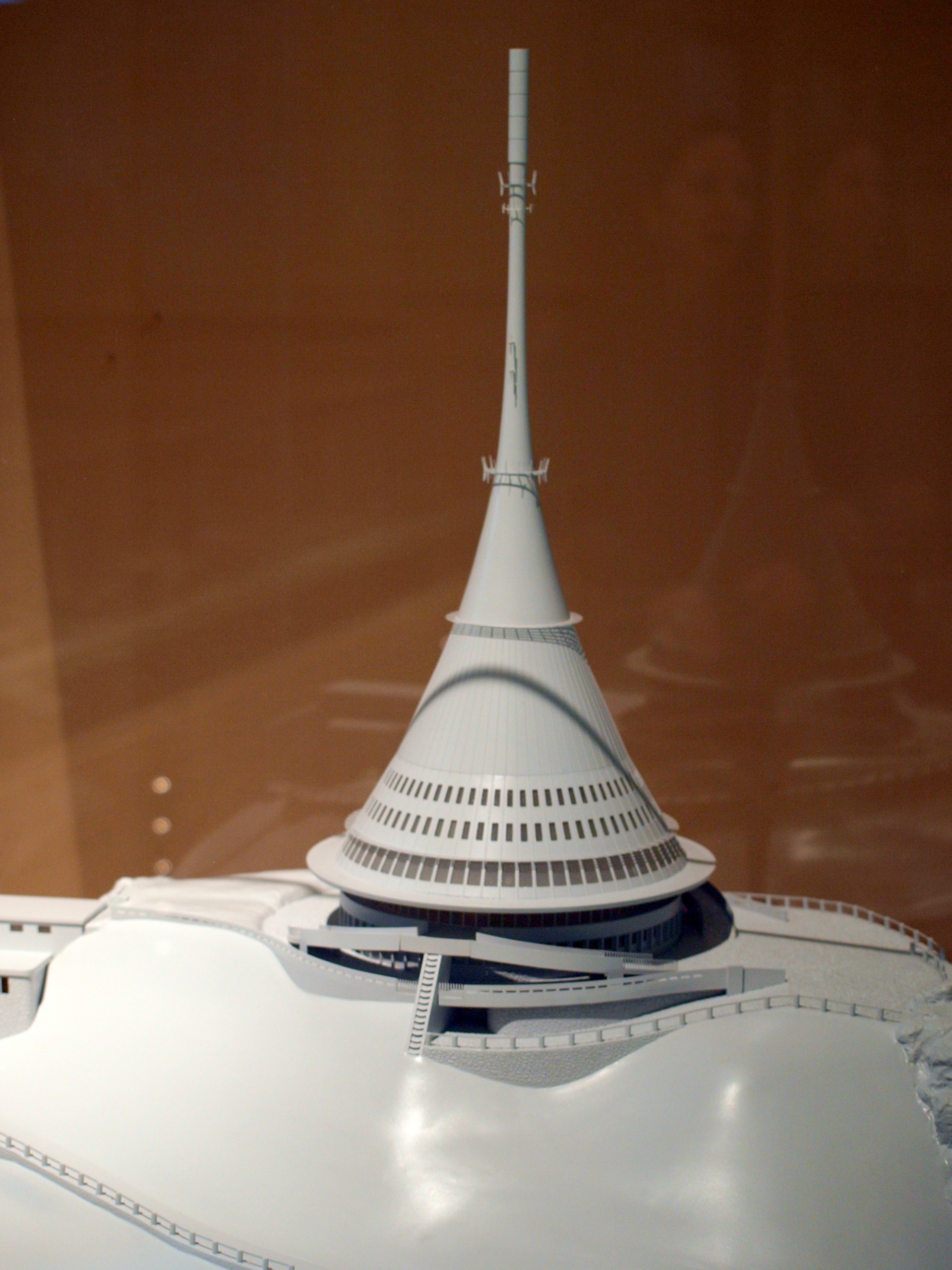
Ještěd model on display in the National Technical Museum in Prague

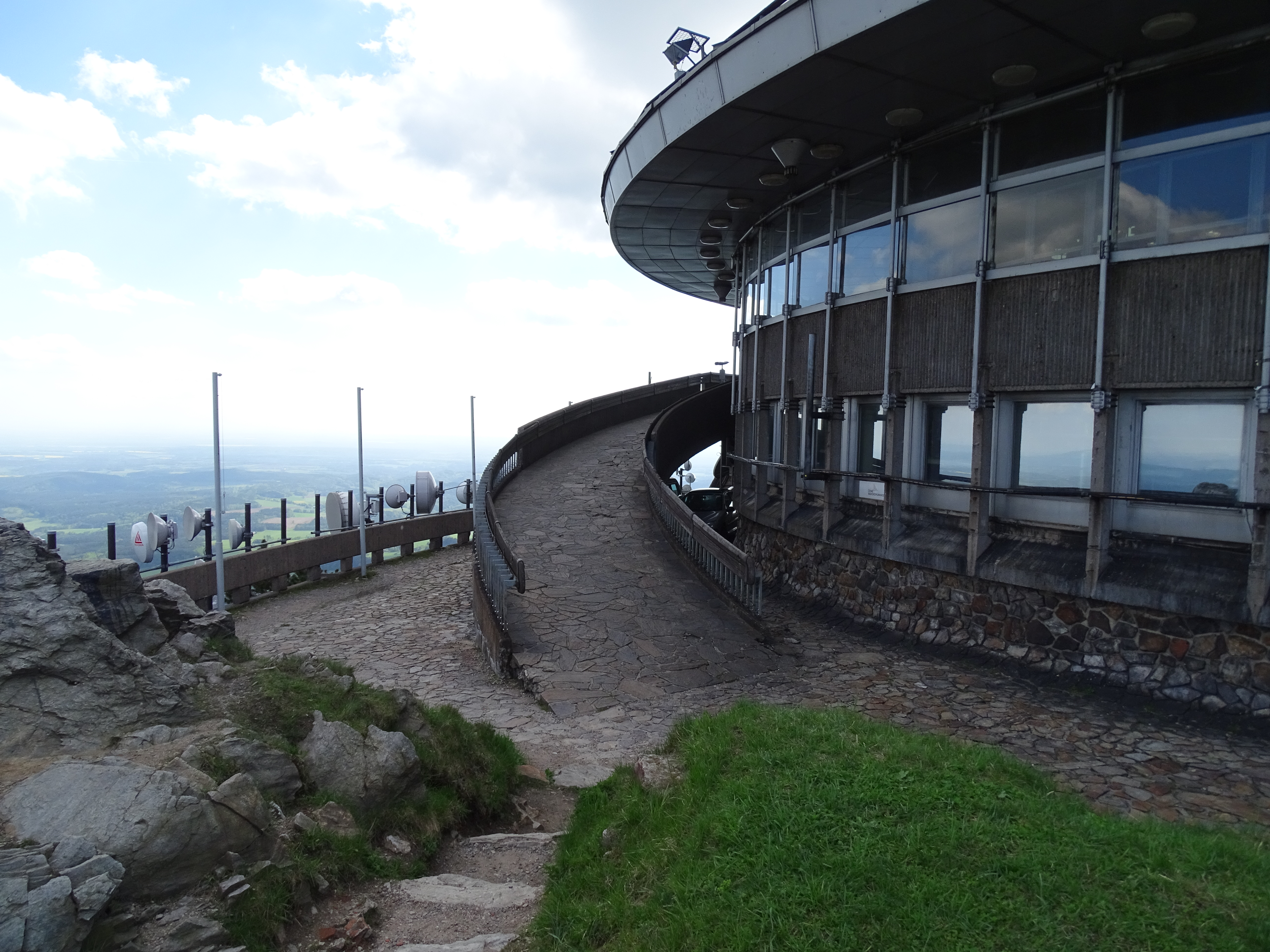
Restaurant ramp

Ještěd Tower (Czech: Hotel a televizní vysílač na Ještědu) is a television transmitter on top of Mount Ještěd near Liberec in the Czech Republic. Measuring 94 m (308 ft), it is made of reinforced concrete shaped in a "hyperboloid" form. The tower was designed by architect Karel Hubáček, who was assisted by Zdeněk Patrman, involved in building statics, and by Otakar Binar, who designed the interior furnishing. It took the team three years to finalize the structure design (1963–1966). The construction itself took seven years to finish (1966–1973).

The hyperboloid shape was chosen since it naturally extends the silhouette of the hill and, moreover, resists the extreme climate conditions on the summit of Mount Ještěd. The design combines the operation of a mountaintop hotel and a television transmitter. The hotel and restaurant are located in the lowest sections of the tower. Before construction of the hotel, two huts stood near the mountain summit: one was built in the middle of the 19th century, and the other was added in the early 20th century. Both buildings had a wooden structure, and both burned to the ground in the 1960s.

The tower is one of the dominant features of the North Bohemian landscape. The gallery on the ground floor and the restaurant on the first offers views as far as Poland and Germany. The tower has been on the list of Czech cultural monuments since 1998, becoming a national cultural monument in 2006. In 2007, it was entered on the Tentative List of UNESCO World Heritage sites. In 1969, Karel Hubáček was awarded the Perret Prize of the International Union of Architects (UIA).

On 24 February 2026, The Liberec Region Council approved the purchase of the Ještěd mountain hotel and transmitter from České Radiokomunikace (ČRa) for 181 million CZK.

== Access ==
The monument is accessible by road and by the Ještěd cable car from the foot of the mountain. However since a crash in 2021, the system has been closed indefinitely.

== Construction ==
After the existing Ještěd lodge burned down in January 1963, a decision was made by Restaurace Liberec (the company that used to manage the burned-down lodges) and the Prague Radio Communications Administration to build a new complex on the summit of Mount Ještěd, which would accommodate a mountain hotel including a restaurant and at the same time would serve as a TV signal transmitter. An architectural competition for the building design was announced. It took place in February 1963 on the Liberec Stavoprojekt premises. Eleven architects/teams took part in the competition, including individual architects Otakar Binar, Jiří Svoboda, Pavel Švancer, Ota Nykodým, Karel Hubáček, Jaromír Syrovátko, Miroslav Ulmann, Jaromír Vacek and teams Josef Patrný, Jiří Hubka, V. Netolička, Miloš Technik, and Svatopluk Technik. Hubáček's design was the only one complying with both the requirements. All the designs were put on public display in the Liberec branch of Československá spořitelna. The jury (aka the council of Liberec district national committee) on its 22 April 1963 meeting chose Hubáček's proposal as the winner.

The building design created some technical problems for Hubáček and his team due to the climate conditions at the summit of Mount Ještěd. Experts from the Czechoslovak Academy of Sciences, the Czech Technical University in Prague and the Liberec Institute of Textile and Mechanical Engineering helped to overcome the technical difficulties. The technological equipment and procedures that were put together were protected by the Czechoslovak patents. Some elements (such as the laminated cladding, the special pendulum or the transverse tuned mass damper) introduced by Zdeněk Patrman in collaboration with the academy experts have since been included in other structures (e.g. the Cukrák transmitter tower).

The ceremonial laying of the foundation stone took place on 30 July 1966. The general contractor was Pozemní stavby from Liberec. On 1 May 1971 the transmitter began its operation. However, the hotel interiors and the restaurant were completed two years later. On 9 July 1973, the Ještěd Tower grand opening took place. The total construction was 64 million Czechoslovak koruna (in 1973).

== Description ==
=== Structure ===
The tower foundation consists of a circular reinforced concrete slab with a thickness of 1 metre and a diameter of 13.40 metres. The foundation is laid in the altitude of 1004.75 metres. The load-bearing element of the structure consists of two concentric reinforced concrete cylinders with inner diameters of 4.4 and 12.5 metres (and wall thickness of 30 centimetres each); the narrower is 42.4 metres high, the wider (external) is 22.5 metres high. Individual floors are suspended on these columns on steel structures, starting with the second floor. The columns were constructed by Průmstav Pardubice. The supporting steel structures for the floors and for the tower structure were manufactured in the Mostárna plant in the then state-owned company Vítkovice Iron Works of Klement Gottwald. A steel shell with a length of 44 metres of a variable diameter (from 10.50 m to 1.62 m) is attached to the inner column. The laminate support cylinder (diameter of 1.90 m and a wall thickness of 16 to 12 mm) attached to it originally had a length of 17.52 m which was extended another 3 metres during the 1997 reconstruction.

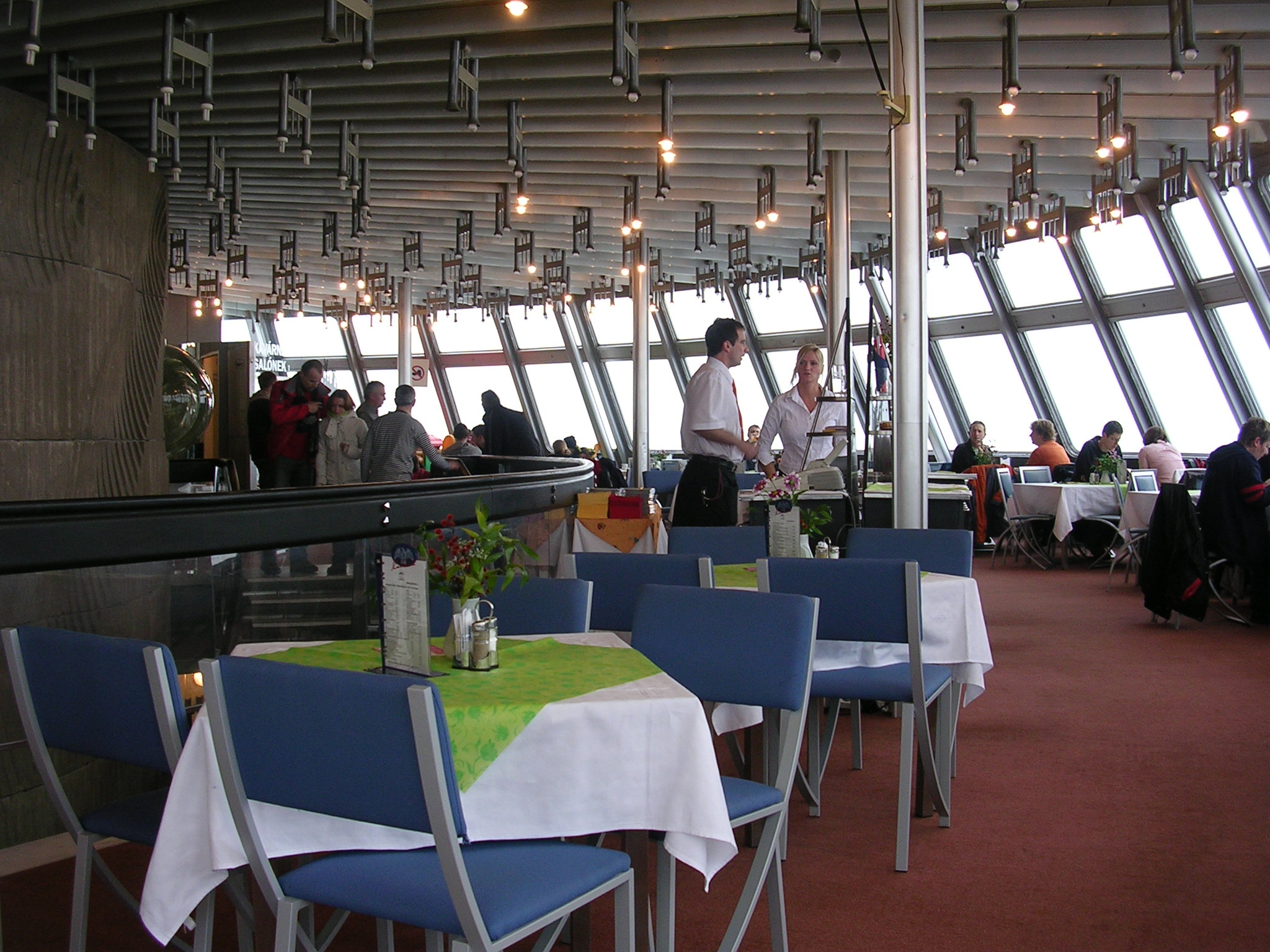
Restaurant interior

=== Floors ===
In the basement of the building, there are engine rooms and warehouses. The first floor is shared by the administrative offices and the television transmission hall that is connected to the antenna systems on the ninth floor by means of an elevator and an emergency staircase built inside the central tube. The rest of the first floor is occupied by the restaurant kitchen. On the second floor there is an observation terrace, a buffet and the main entrance hall with the reception desk. The hall is dominated by a suspended staircase leading to an observation restaurant on the third floor.

On the fourth and fifth floor there are hotel rooms. On the fourth floor there are 12 double rooms and one apartment. Rooms on the fifth floor were originally used as flats for the hotel and transmitter employees but were later converted to hotel apartments. The sixth and seventh floors house the transmitting technology. There is a specially developed laminated cladding in the shape of a revolving hyperboloid shielding against extreme weather conditions. On the eighth and ninth floors the architect placed drinking water tanks and a backup battery power supply. There is an elevator engine room on the tenth floor. Above it a special pendulum is installed, movement of which absorb cross vibrations caused by the wind.

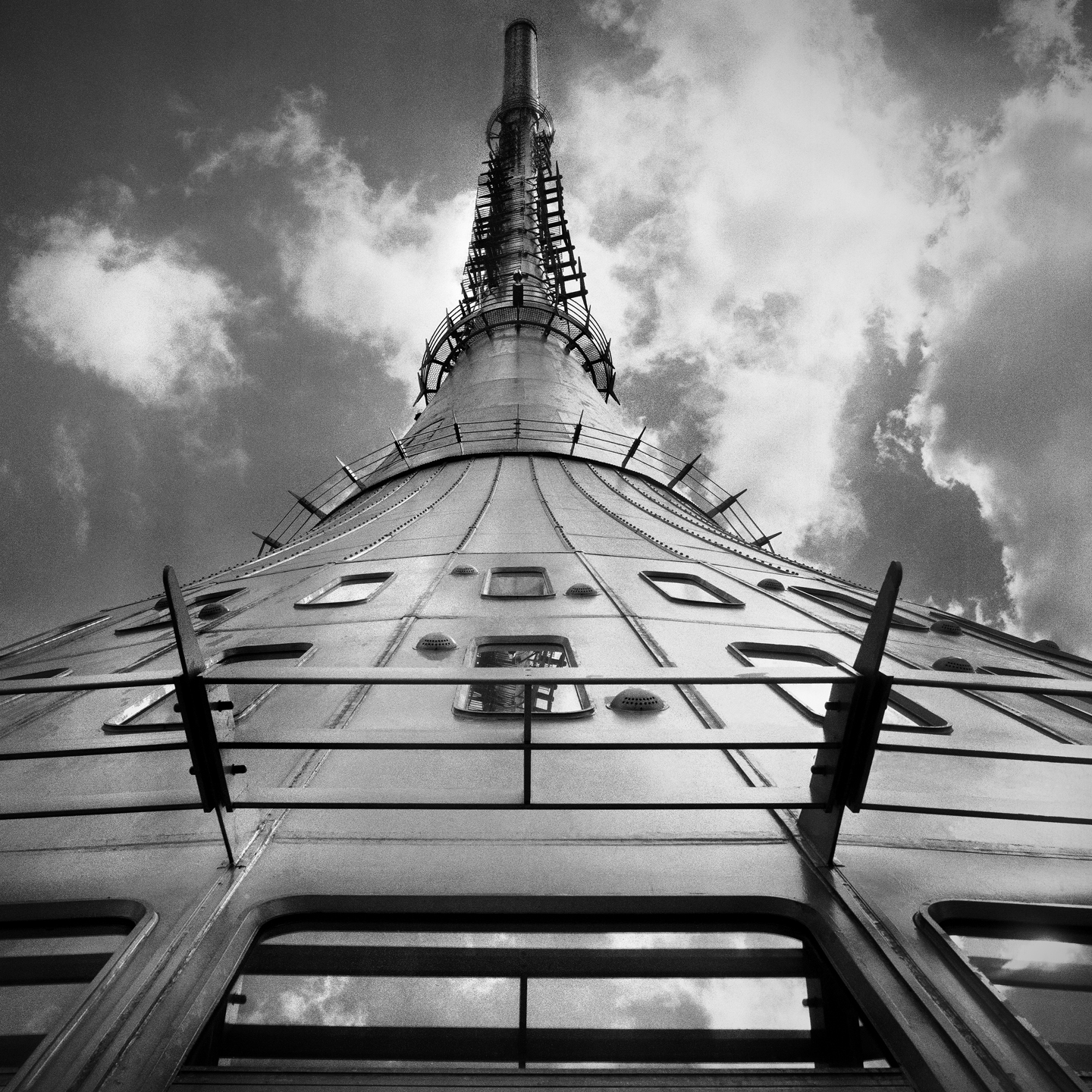
Jiří Jiroutek Phenomenon Ještěd 01

=== Exterior ===
At the third to the fifth floor levels (i.e. the restaurant and hotel floors) the outer shell takes on the shape of a conical rotating surface. It consists of 64 conically placed panels. The panel surface is made of anodized aluminium sheets. At the restaurant level, these panels are glazed over the entire width and complemented by a low window sill, while at the hotel level there are smaller windows with rounded corners.

Parabolic antennas of microwave transmitters are located on the seventh and eighth floors. The building cover is made of trapezoid-shaped laminated panels, which are not joined by any metal elements, as these would prevent the passage of electromagnetic waves. The upper side of the elevator machine room on the tenth floor is fitted with a welded steel tube, which forms a 48 meter high antenna mast. Its surface is covered with metallized aluminum and a spiral staircase leads up inside the tube. At the top of the mast there is a self-supporting laminate extension of 18 meters attached. During the 1997 transmitter reconstruction it was extended by another 3 meters. The extension is there to protect the TV broadcast antennas against the elements. On top of the extension there is a steel lid, on which an annular pendulum weighing 800 kg is suspended by means of dampers.

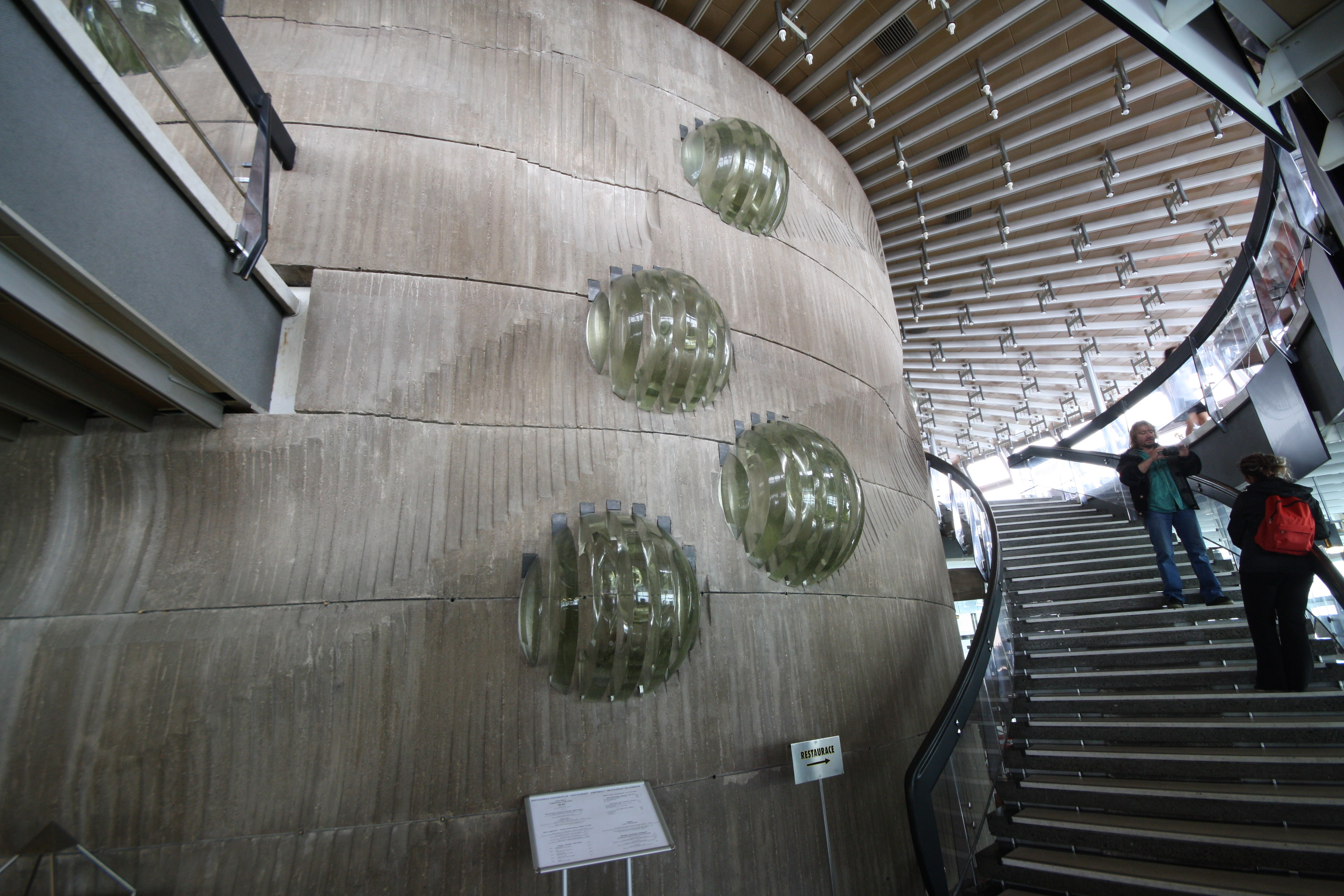
Glass emblems mounted on the concrete transmitter shaft

=== Interior design ===
The interior design including its furniture comes from Otakar Binar. Cookware and some textile accessories were based on Karl Wünsch designs. Glass makers Stanislav Libenský and his partner Jaroslava Brychtová also participated in the interior furnishing. They originally planned inserting a tall glass pendulum in the publicly accessible space. The pendulum would consist of two lenses representing the eternal movement. Instead, they decided to drill eight glass emblems into the concrete transmitter shaft. According to the artists, the shaft and its modification suggested the tower was growing up from the rock. On the other hand, for Karel Hubáček the glass emblems embodied fallen meteorites. The author of the trellis located in the hotel corridor is Jaroslav Klápště. The staircase walls and the hotel corridors are lined with ceramic tiles designed by Děvana Mírová. The entrance doors and the hotel reception walls are covered with wrought sheets by Miloš Koška, the tapestry hanging on the lounge wall was created by Vladimír Křečan.

=== Transmitter ===
On 1 May 1971, the transmitter (equipped with Tesla III-Zona) began broadcasting television signal from the new tower. In September 1973, broadcasting of the second Czechoslovak Television program was added.

After the Velvet Revolution, the transmitter (using a Tesla equipment) was spreading signals of Czech Television (ČT1 and ČT2), Nova and Prima and Czech Radio (Radiožurnál, Praha (today Dvojka) and Vltava) and of private operators (Radio Proglas, Radio Contact Liberec and Europe 2).

In connection with the broadcasting digitization in the Czech Republic, in June 2009, the antenna systems in the laminate extension were updated.

In addition to radio and television broadcasting, Jested is also an important node for radio relay and optical links. Mobile operators T-Mobile, O2, Vodafone and Nordic Telecom have base stations (BTS) here.

== Awards and accolades ==
In 1964, the Association of Architects of the Czechoslovak Socialist Republic awarded the Ještěd Tower design on its annual Architectural Works 1962–63 exhibit. In spring of 1969, at a time when the building had not yet been completed, Karel Hubáček was awarded the Auguste Perret Prize for the creative use of technology in architecture by the International Union of Architects. It is the most significant award ever achieved by a Czech architect. In 2000, the building was awarded the title “The Most Important Czech Building of the 20th Century” In September 2005, in the iDNES.cz "Seven Wonders of the Czech Republic" readers survey the tower ranked as second being defeated by the Dlouhé stráně Hydro Power Plant.

On 26 March 1998, the Ministry of Culture of the Czech Republic registered the building as an immovable cultural monument. In January 2006, the building was declared a national cultural monument. On 29 May 2007, it was added to the Indicative List of Cultural Property of the Czech Republic, of which buildings are nominated for inclusion in the UNESCO World Heritage List.

== Impact ==
The tower is the main symbol of the city of Liberec. Its silhouette appears on the region's flag and the coat-of-arms, on the local university's logo and on the logo of the local first-league football club FC Slovan Liberec.

The building is featured in the Czech movie Grandhotel based on the eponymous book by Jaroslav Rudiš.

== See also ==
- List of towers
- Hyperboloid structure
- List of hyperboloid structures
