= Kryštofovo Údolí =

- Municipality
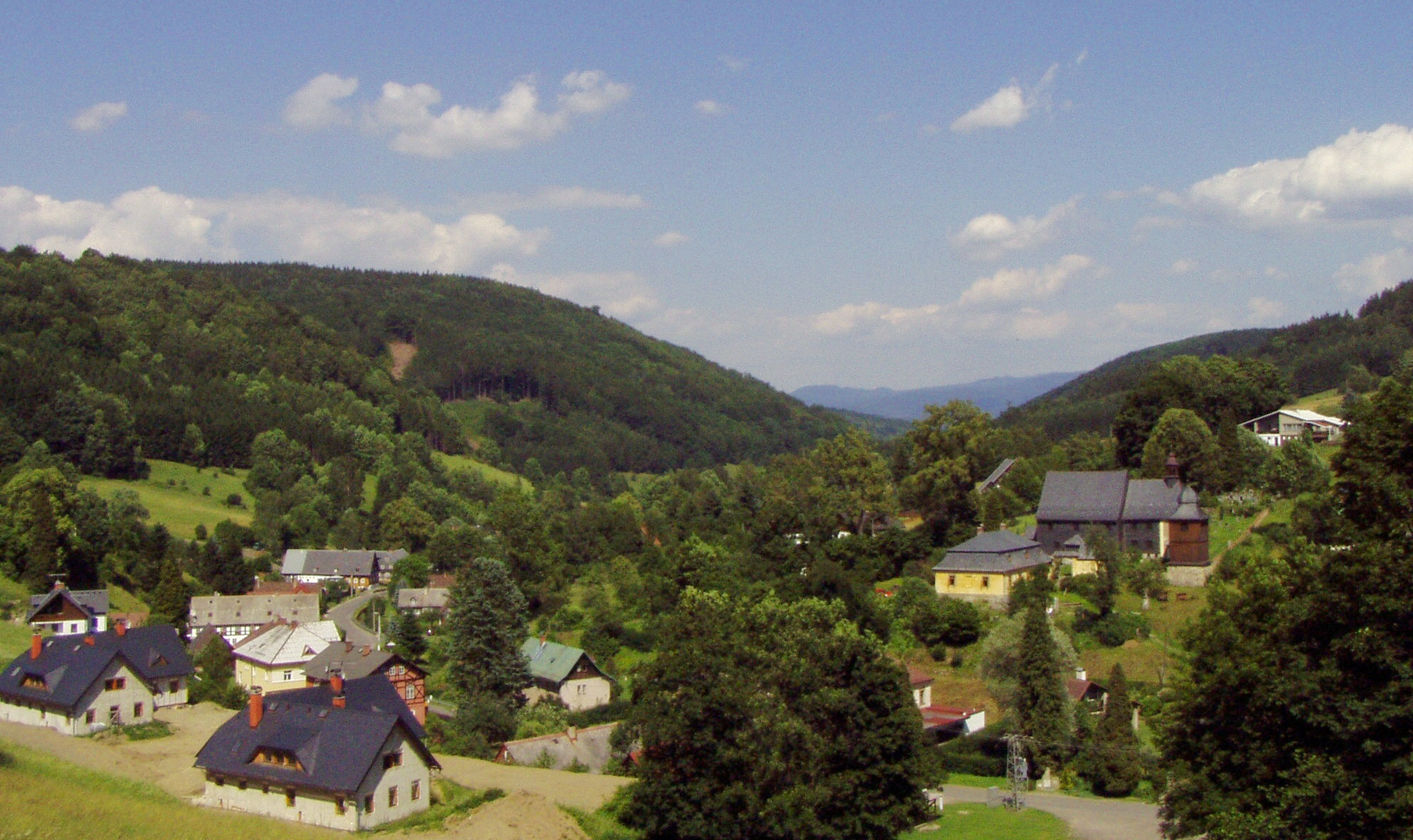
- View towards the Church of Saint Christopher

- Flag Coat of arms

- Location in the Czech Republic
- Coordinates: 50°46′28″N 14°56′0″E
- Country: Czech Republic
- Region: Liberec
- District: Liberec
- First mentioned: 1581

Area
  - Total: 17.34 km^{2} (6.70 sq mi)
- Elevation: 375 m (1,230 ft)

Population (2026-01-01)
  - Total: 434
  - Density: 25.0/km^{2} (64.8/sq mi)
- Time zone: UTC+1 (CET)
  - Summer (DST): UTC+2 (CEST)
- Postal code: 460 01
- Website: www.krystofovoudoli.eu

Kryštofovo Údolí (Czech pronunciation: [ˈkrɪʃtofovo ˈuːdoliː]; German: Christofsgrund) is a municipality and village in Liberec District in the Liberec Region of the Czech Republic. It has about 400 inhabitants. Kryštofovo Údolí is located in the valley of the Rokytka Stream, in the Ještěd–Kozákov Ridge. The village is well preserved and is protected as a village monument zone.

== Administrative division ==
Kryštofovo Údolí consists of two municipal parts (in brackets population according to the 2021 census):

- Kryštofovo Údolí (308)
- Novina (80)

== Etymology ==
The name means "Kryštof's valley" in Czech. It was probably named after Kryštof of Donín (German: Christoph von Dohna), who owned the area and is one of the possible founders of the village.

== Geography ==
Kryštofovo Údolí is located about 8 kilometres (5 mi) west of Liberec. In lies in a hilly landscape of the Ještěd–Kozákov Ridge. The highest point is on the slopes of the Ještěd mountain at 853 m (2,799 ft) above sea level, located in the southern tip of the municipal territory. The municipal border runs through the peaks and ridges of several other prominent hills, such as Černá hora (811 m), Rozsocha (767 m), Kaliště (745 m), and Malý Ještěd (754 m).

The built-up area is situated in the valley of the Rokytka Stream. The Lusatian Neisse flows shortly along the northeastern municipal border. Their confluence is located on the municipal border.

== History ==
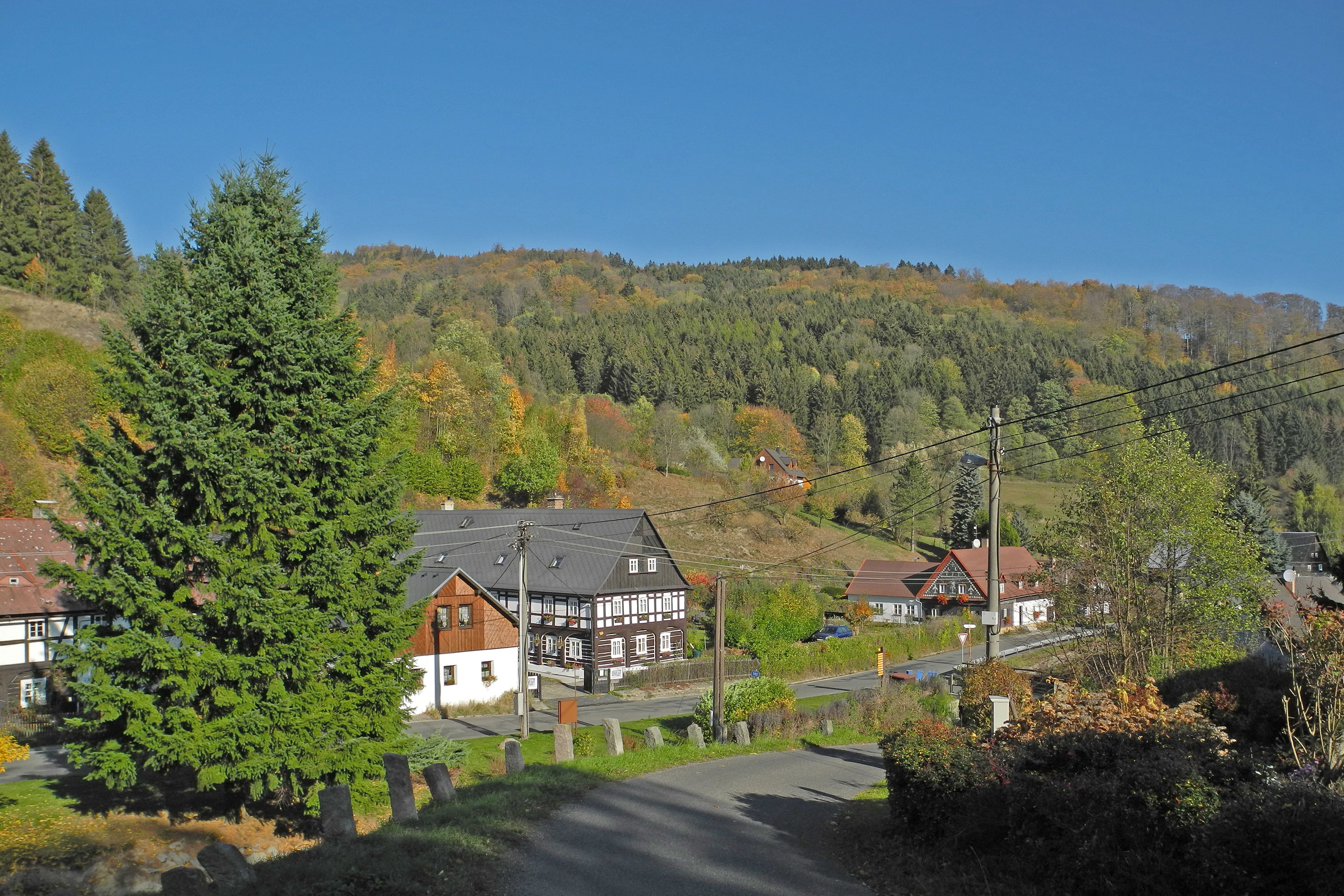
Folk architecture in Kryštofovo Údolí

The place arose in a left side valley of the Lusatian Neisse as a charcoal and mining settlement. According to legends, the settlement was founded in the 15th century by a charcoal burner named Christophorus, but it is proven that the area was not settled in 1518. The area was then part of the Lemberk estate bought by the advocatus of the Upper Lusatia, Wilhelm von Eilenburg. Ore mining in the area began in the 16th century. In the mid-16th century, Křižany and the area of Kryštofovo Údolí were separated from the estate and sold to Nicholas II of Donín, who joined it to the Grabštejn estate.

The first written mention of Kryštofovo Údolí and Novina (under their German names Christofsgrund and Neuland) is from 1581, when the estate was bought by Jindřich Berka of Dubá, and a hammer mill in the village was mentioned. The settlement of Rokytnice (German: Eckersbach), which later merged with Kryštofovo Údolí, was founded between 1518 and 1528. In the course of the Counter Reformation after the Thirty Years' War, a large part of the Protestant population left the place and Catholics were settled. Mining was operated until about 1750, but was stopped due to the poor yield.

In 1826, the entrepreneurs Siegmund and Neuhäuser from Liberec built a textile factory below Christofsgrund on the Lusatian Neisse. Between 1852 and 1858, the main trunkroad was built. In 1856–1859, the railway from Liberec to Zittau was built, and the railway that passed right through the village was built in 1900. For this, a 194 m (636 ft) long viaduct with 14 arches has to be constructed and the 818 m (2,684 ft) long tunnel also was built.

At the beginning of the 20th century, most of the population were Germans. The main source of livelihood was agriculture, especially arable farming and cattle breeding, but due to its difficult operation in the hilly landscape and low yields, many residents worked in forestry, worked as craftsmen in the surrounding villages, or commuted to work in factories in nearby Liberec.

In 1921, the Czech name of the municipality was changed to Údol Svatého Kryštofa. As a result of the Munich Agreement, Christofsgrund was annexed by Nazi Germany in 1938. After the war, the Germans were expelled. In 1960, the municipality was renamed Kryštofovo Údolí. From 1980 to 1990, Kryštofovo Údolí was incorporated into Chrastava.

== Demographics ==
Historical population

Year	Pop.	±%
1869	1,628	—
1880	1,462	−10.2%
1890	1,389	−5.0%
1900	1,344	−3.2%
1910	1,273	−5.3%

Year	Pop.	±%
1921	1,102	−13.4%
1930	1,163	+5.5%
1950	447	−61.6%
1961	479	+7.2%
1970	297	−38.0%

Year	Pop.	±%
1980	210	−29.3%
1991	143	−31.9%
2001	200	+39.9%
2011	301	+50.5%
2021	388	+28.9%

Source: Censuses

== Transport ==
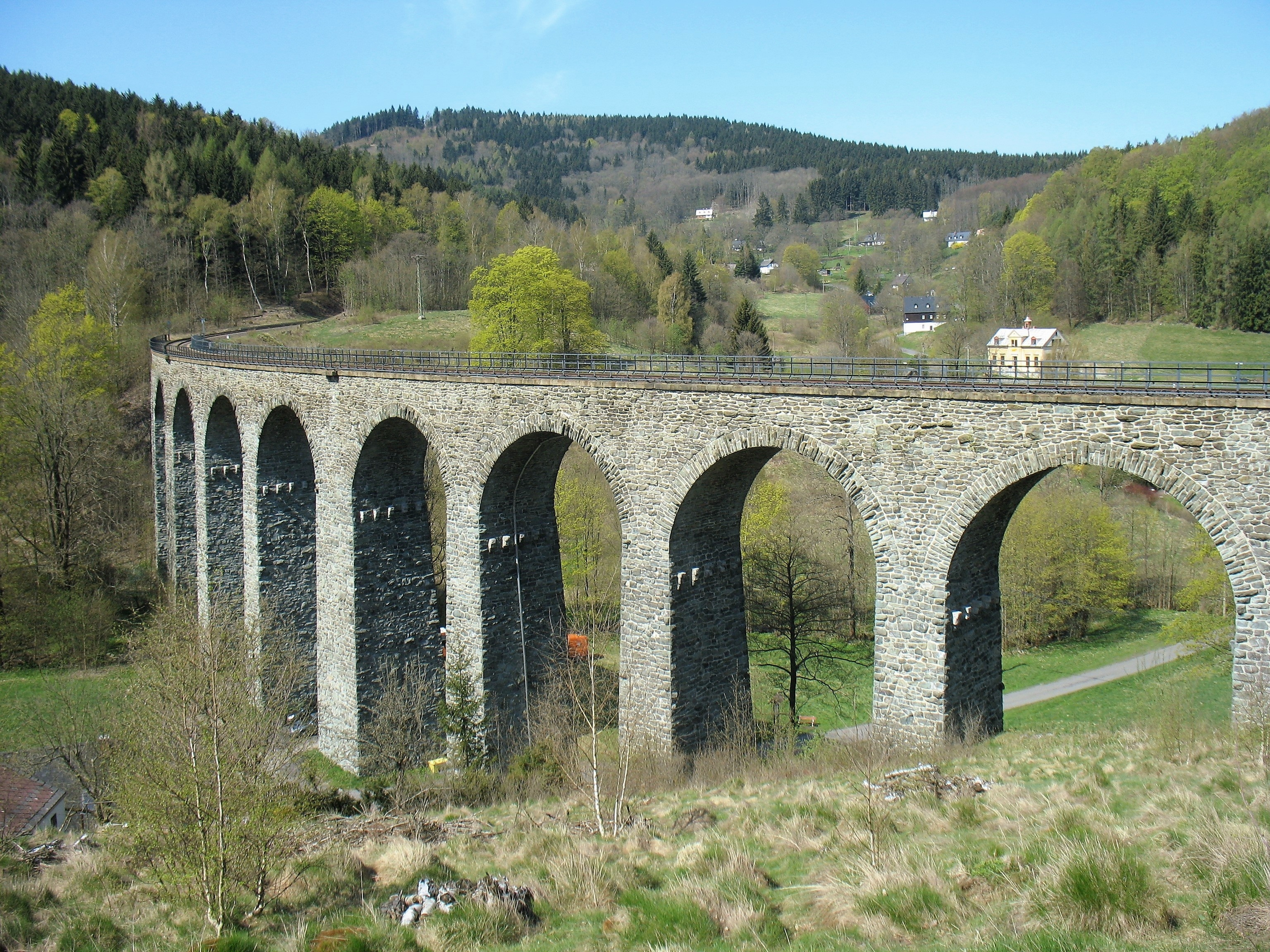
Novina Viaduct

Kryštofovo Údolí lies on the railway line Liberec–Děčín.

== Sights ==
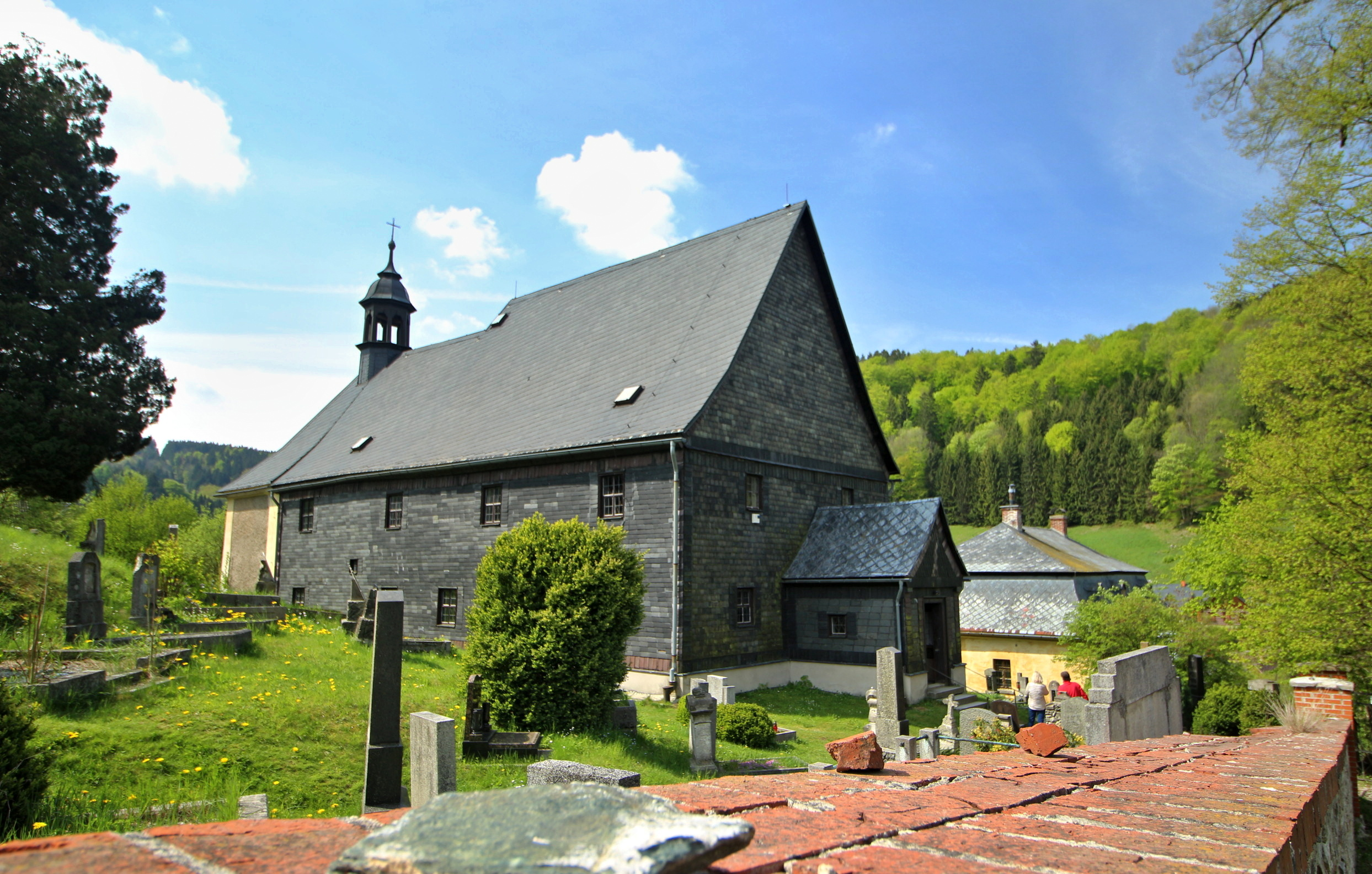
Church of Saint Christopher

The village of Kryštofovo Údolí is protected as a village monument zone for a preserved set of folk architecture, consisting of multi-story houses with a timbered ground floor and half-timbered floor. The landmark and the most valuable monument is the wooden Church of Saint Christopher. It was built in the early Baroque style in 1683–1684. It is one of the few preserved timbered building with slate cladding. The walls and ceiling of the church are decorated with fifteen paintings from the life of Christ. Next to the church are wooden bell tower and mortuary, and a Baroque rectory from 1786.

In the centre of Kryštofovo Údolí there is a stone bridge with a statue of St. John of Nepomuk. Other minor monuments are the Chapel of St. Christopher on the saddle between the mountains Malý Vápenný and Lom, and the Chapel of the Virgin Mary.

Railway viaducts and tunnels near Novina are technical monuments. The most notable is the Novina Viaduct, which was put into operation in 1900. It is 202 m (663 ft) long, and the highest pillars are 27 m (89 ft) high. It is an important technical work and a cultural monument.

There was the Museum of Nativity Scenes and opposite the museum there was the Martin Chaloupka's astronomical clock, a modern astronomical clock created in a former electrical substation. In 2023, the owner decided to move the museum and the astronomical clock to Žibřidice.
