= Jiří Svoboda =

Jiří Svoboda may refer to:

- Jiří Svoboda (athlete) (1903–1937), Czech javelin thrower
- Jiří Svoboda (volleyball) (born 1941), Czech volleyball player
- Jiří Svoboda (director) (born 1945), Czech film director, screenwriter and politician
- Jiří Svoboda (canoeist) (born 1954), Czechoslovak sprint canoeist
- Jiří Svoboda (architect) (born 1961), Czech architect, artist and teacher
- Jiří Svoboda (ANO politician, born 1959) (born 1959), Czech politician
- Jiří Svoboda (ANO politician, born 1989) (born 1989), Czech politician
