= Velenice =

Velenice may refer to places in the Czech Republic:

- Velenice (Česká Lípa District), a municipality and village in the Liberec Region
- Velenice (Nymburk District), a municipality and village in the Central Bohemian Region
- České Velenice, a town in the South Bohemian Region
