= Watsky (surname) =

Watsky is a surname, which is the Americanized spelling of Watzke. Notable people with the surname include:

- Andrew Watsky (born 1957), American academic, art historian, author and university professor
- George Watsky (born 1986), American rapper, singer, musician, songwriter, record producer
