= Kněžnice =

- Municipality
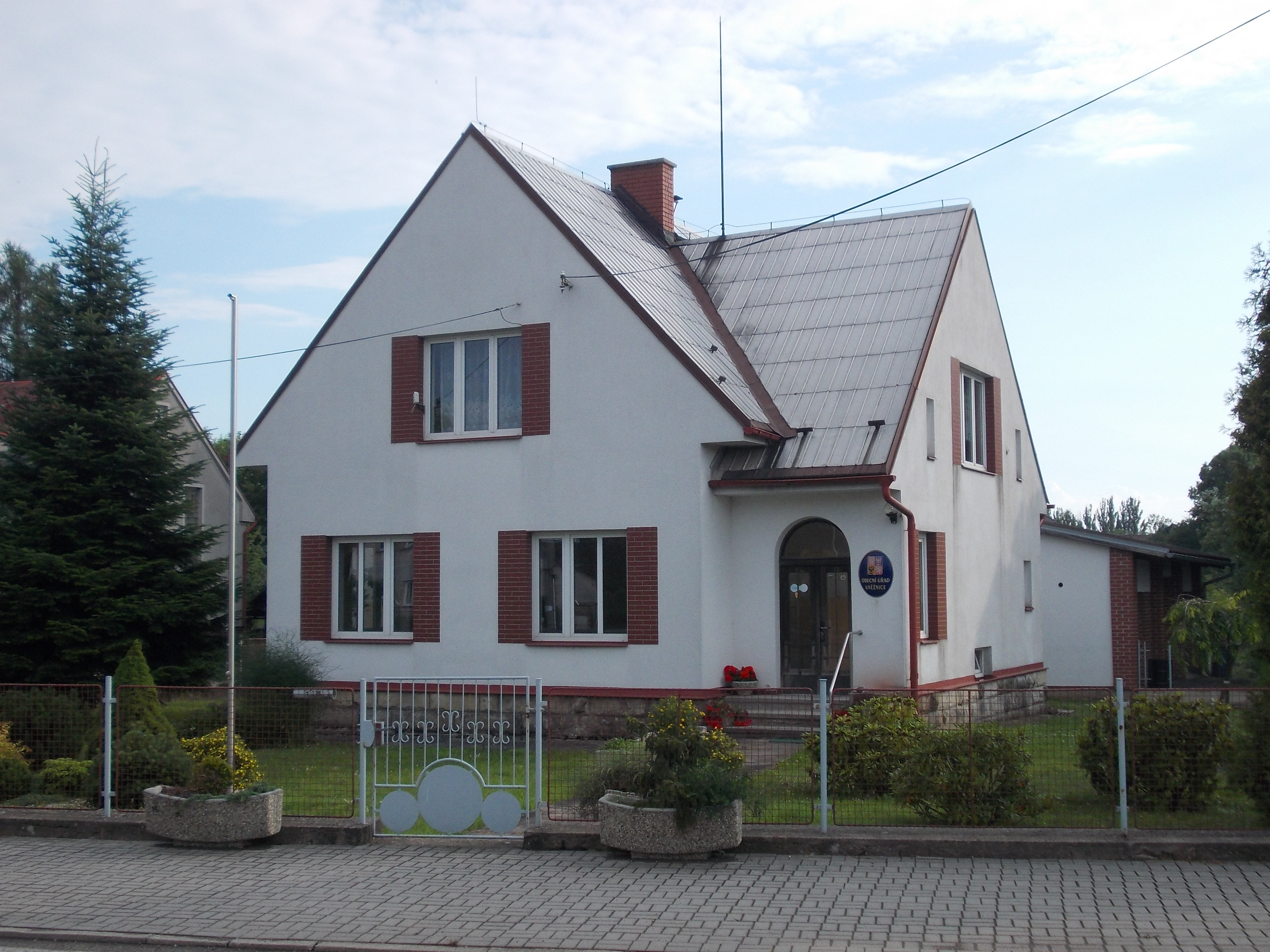
- Municipal office

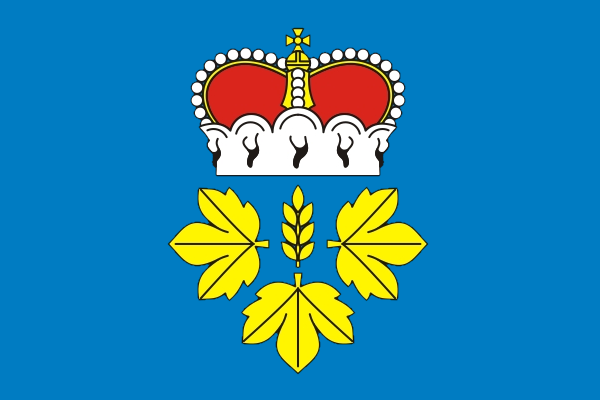
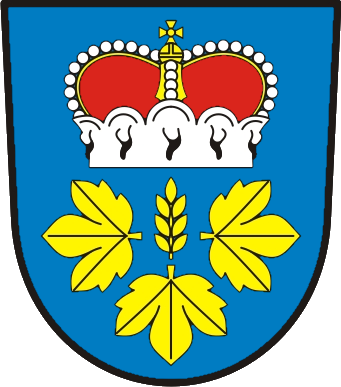
- Flag Coat of arms

- Location in the Czech Republic
- Coordinates: 50°29′36″N 15°19′21″E
- Country: Czech Republic
- Region: Hradec Králové
- District: Jičín
- First mentioned: 1227

Area
  - Total: 6.69 km^{2} (2.58 sq mi)
- Elevation: 369 m (1,211 ft)

Population (2026-01-01)
  - Total: 271
  - Density: 40.5/km^{2} (105/sq mi)
- Time zone: UTC+1 (CET)
  - Summer (DST): UTC+2 (CEST)
- Postal code: 506 01
- Website: www.kneznice.cz

Kněžnice is a municipality and village in Jičín District in the Hradec Králové Region of the Czech Republic. It has about 300 inhabitants.

== Administrative division ==
Kněžnice consists of two municipal parts (in brackets population according to the 2021 census):

- Kněžnice (257)
- Javornice (18)

== Etymology ==
The initial name of the village was Knínice. The name was derived from the Old Czech word knieni (i.e. 'nuns'), meaning "the village of people belonging to the nuns". It referred to the ownership of the village by the St. George's Convent in Prague. From the 17th century, the name appeared as Kněžnice.

== Geography ==
Kněžnice is located about 6 kilometres (4 mi) northwest of Jičín and 34 km (21 mi) southeast of Liberec. It lies mostly in the Jičín Uplands. The northern part of the municipal territory extends into the Ještěd–Kozákov Ridge and includes the highest point of Kněžnice, which is located below the top of the mountain Kozlov at 600 m (1,969 ft) above sea level.

The Libuňka Stream originates here and flows across the municipality. The southern part of the municipal territory lies in the Bohemian Paradise Protected Landscape Area.

== History ==
The first written mention of Kněžnice is from 1227.

== Demographics ==
Historical population

Year	Pop.	±%
1869	631	—
1880	634	+0.5%
1890	617	−2.7%
1900	604	−2.1%
1910	596	−1.3%

Year	Pop.	±%
1921	580	−2.7%
1930	567	−2.2%
1950	441	−22.2%
1961	436	−1.1%
1970	377	−13.5%

Year	Pop.	±%
1980	299	−20.7%
1991	242	−19.1%
2001	227	−6.2%
2011	267	+17.6%
2021	275	+3.0%

Source: Censuses

== Transport ==
The I/35 road (the section from Jičín to Turnov, part of the European route E442) runs through the municipality.

== Sights ==
The only protected cultural monument in the municipality is a stone crucifix from 1801.
