= Křižany =

- Municipality
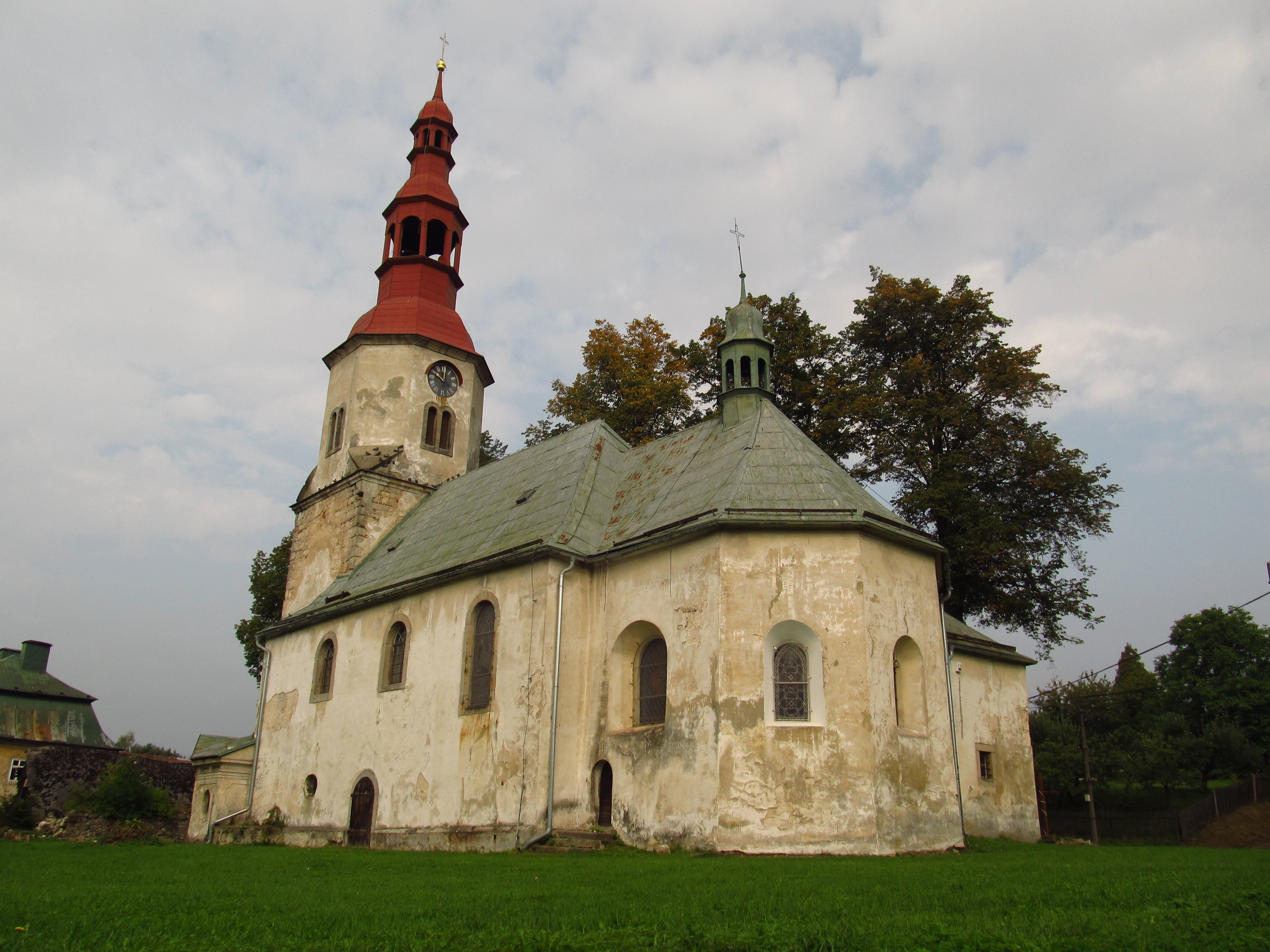
- Church of Saint Maximilian

- Flag Coat of arms

- Location in the Czech Republic
- Coordinates: 50°44′19″N 14°54′5″E
- Country: Czech Republic
- Region: Liberec
- District: Liberec
- First mentioned: 1352

Area
  - Total: 28.58 km^{2} (11.03 sq mi)
- Elevation: 386 m (1,266 ft)

Population (2026-01-01)
  - Total: 861
  - Density: 30.1/km^{2} (78.0/sq mi)
- Time zone: UTC+1 (CET)
  - Summer (DST): UTC+2 (CEST)
- Postal code: 463 53
- Website: www.obeckrizany.cz

Křižany (until 1923 Křížany; German: Kriesdorf) is a municipality and village in Liberec District in the Liberec Region of the Czech Republic. It has about 900 inhabitants.

== Administrative division ==
Křižany consists of two municipal parts (in brackets population according to the 2021 census):

- Křižany (562)
- Žibřidice (287)

== Etymology ==
The initial name of Křižany was Suchá. The name Suchá meant 'dry' and referred to the local stream. In Latin, the village was called Crizani villa ("Křižan's village", referring to its lokator), from which the Germanised name was created (written in various forms, e.g. Kryznstorff, Kryszdorff, Krisdorf, etc.), and from this the new Czech name Křižany was created. Between 1854 and 1923, the name was written as Křížany.

== Geography ==
Křižany is located about 10 kilometres (6 mi) west of Liberec. In lies mostly in the Ralsko Uplands, only the eastern part of the municipal territory extends into the Ještěd–Kozákov Ridge. The highest point is the hill Malý Ještěd at 754 m (2,474 ft) above sea level. The built-up area is situated in the valley of the stream Ještědský potok.

== History ==
The first written mention of Křižany is from 1352. Until 1684, a fortress stood in the village.

== Demographics ==
Historical population

Year	Pop.	±%
1869	3,409	—
1880	3,192	−6.4%
1890	2,895	−9.3%
1900	2,670	−7.8%
1910	2,494	−6.6%

Year	Pop.	±%
1921	2,317	−7.1%
1930	2,371	+2.3%
1950	1,169	−50.7%
1961	986	−15.7%
1970	891	−9.6%

Year	Pop.	±%
1980	740	−16.9%
1991	678	−8.4%
2001	652	−3.8%
2011	776	+19.0%
2021	849	+9.4%

Source: Censuses

== Transport ==
Křižany is located on the railway line Liberec–Děčín.

== Sights ==
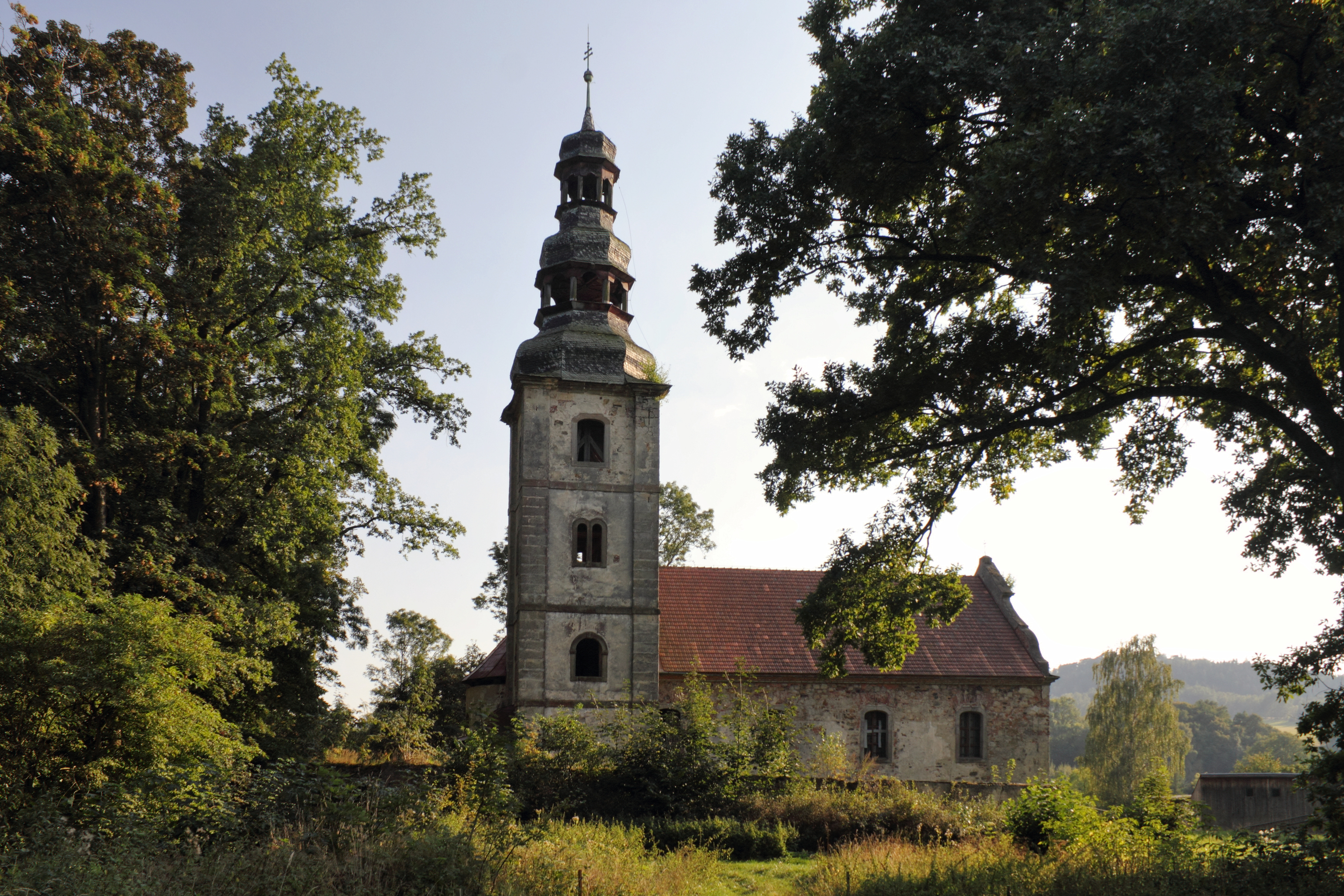
Church of Saints Simon and Jude

The main landmark of Křižany is the Church of Saint Maximilian. It was originally a Gothic church from the 14th century, rebuilt in the Baroque style in the 17th century. The tower was added in 1684.

The Church of Saints Simon and Jude is located in Žibřidice. It dates from the 1670s.

In Žibřidice is the Museum of Nativity Scenes and the Martin Chaloupka's astronomical clock, a modern astronomical clock created in a former electrical substation. In 2023, the owner decided to move the museum and the astronomical clock from Kryštofovo Údolí.

== Notable people ==
- Josef Vacke (1907–1987), artist and painter; lived here
