= Martin Chaloupka's astronomical clock =

Coordinates: 50°44′31″N 14°51′32″E

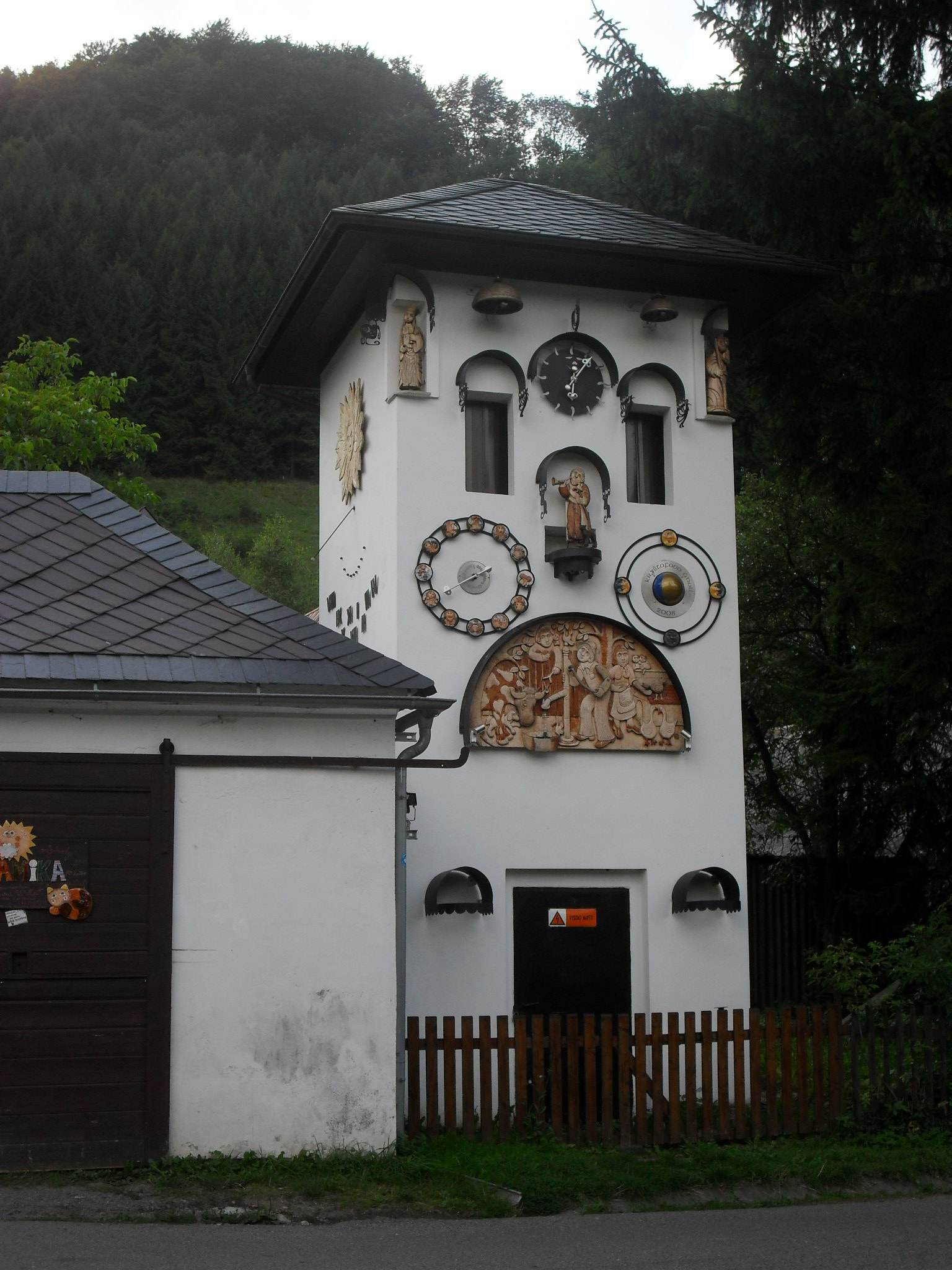
The astronomical clock in its previous location in Kryštofovo Údolí

Martin Chaloupka's astronomical clock is an astronomical clock in Liberec District, Czech Republic. It was built in 2006–2011 in Kryštofovo Údolí, and was moved to Žibřidice (in the municipality of Křižany) in 2023.

The clock's construction was directed by Martin Chaloupka.

== History ==
The clock was originally installed in a former electrical substation in Kryštofovo Údolí. The project started in 2006, it was inaugurated on 20 September 2008, and completed in 2011.

In 2023, the owner of the clock (Chaloupka's daughter Alice Chmelíková) decided to move the clock to the former fire station in Žibřidice.

== Technical details ==
The clock has three dials, showing the time, the zodiac, and the lunar phase. It is driven by an electric motor.

As the clock chimes the hour, the twelve apostles file past two doors at the top of the clock, as on the Prague astronomical clock.
