= Josef Vacke =

- Born: Josef Watzke; July 18, 1907; Prague, Austria-Hungary
- Died: December 18, 1987 (aged 80); Prague, Czechoslovakia

Signature
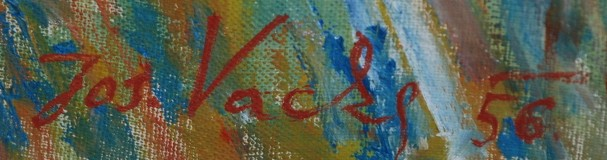

Josef Vacke (18 July 1907 – 18 December 1987), born Josef Watzke, was a Czech artist and painter.

== Family ==
Writer Vladimír Watzke and painter Josef Vacke were brothers. Both were the children of Karel Watzke and Anna Zyka ("Zyka" was a pseudonym that Vladimír used as his most common pseudonym). They had 3 children; Vladimír Watzke was born in 1900, Karel Watzke was born in 1902 and Josef Watzke (Vacke) was born in 1907. Vladimir Watzke was a very prolific writer of Czech fiction books, primarily fantasy and science fiction, who was highly popular in his time (thirties and forties).

== Biography ==
Josef Vacke was born during the time of the Austro-Hungarian Empire, into a family that identified as Czech, but was of German extraction on the paternal side. His parents changed the spelling of the family name from the German orthography "Watzke" to the Czech orthography "Vacke" (identically pronounced), as an open expression of Czech patriotism.

For several years, he taught painting at the Ebert school, where he led the painter Antonín Porket. Between 1923 and 1924 he studied at a private school at Ferdinand Engelmüler, and from 1925 to 1931 at the Academy of Fine Arts in the Landscape special show of Professor Otakar Nejedlý in Prague.

His first study tour was undertaken in 1925 in Cagnes-sur-Mer, and then another trip to Cap d'Agnes (1926), Corsica (1928), and Ponte du Suve at Toulon (1930). He stayed with the Nejedlý school in Jílové u Prahy, Malá Skála, Hrubá Skála, Hluboká nad Vltavou, Vlastislav, and in České Středohoří. In 1928 Vacke received a scholarship to travel to Paris, under the renowned professor Antonín Matějíček. In 1931 and 1935 Vacke painted with Lucie Klímová in Yugoslavia. He also stayed in Zděchov, where his benefactor for his painting, was Ludvík Klímek for whom he painted in 1943 in Zděchov four watercolors.

During World War II, he often stayed on the Sázava and in the Vysočina Region. After 1946, when gaining a cottage No. 91 in Křižany, there are increasingly appearing in his works paintings of Podještědí. Lucie Klímová since 1946, moved to Křižany, where she spent months in a cottage with Vacke. When Lucie Klímová died in 1961, his partner was Božena Škodová. Josef Vacke often stayed and painted also at Velenice, whence came his mate Božena Škodová.

From 1935 he was a member of the Club of Visual Artists "Aleš". He most often painted landscapes and flowers, including bouquets. Occasionally, one sees in his paintings, figurative motifs.

== Selected works ==
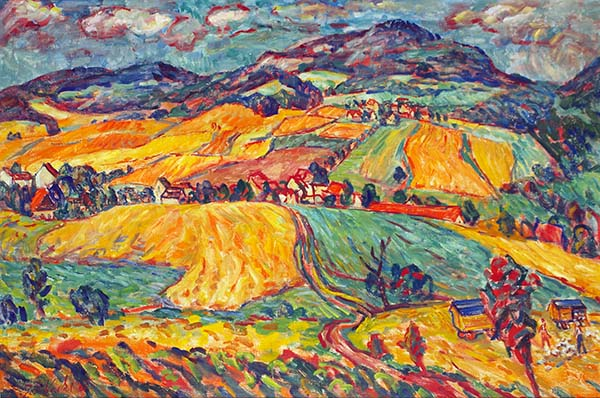
Rakovnicko a česká krajina, a painting by Josef Vacke

- 1925: Nezabudice
- 1926: Evening at the Cap d'Antibes
- 1927: In Polabi (Brandýs nad Labem); Harvest in Nezabudice
- 1931: Korcula; Orebić; Pine forest at Rab (in Yugoslavia)
- 1933: Summer Landscape (Nezabudice); Autumn in Šárce
- 1937: Window; Czech Šternberk
- 1938: Podesta (Nezabudice); Field near the village ( Nezabudice ); Still Life with Melon; Harvest in Nezabudice
- 1939: The Virgin Mary at Nezabudice; Rusava; Strašínská peripherals
- 1940: Křižany
- 1943: Zděchov (3 watercolors)
- 1943: Corpus Christi in Zděchov
- 1952: Parties in Křižany
- 1954: Harvest in Podještědí
- 1956: Journey to the station (Křižany); The cottages (Křižany)
- 1958: Lucie Klímová at the cottage (Křižany)

== Exhibitions ==
=== Overview exhibitions ===
- 1936: Prague gallery Blue Salon (together with Vaclav Trefil)
- 1938: Prague gallery Topic Salon – Paintings of Nezabudice
- 1941: Stone Ferry (together with Lucie Klimova)
- 1942: Rakovník Křivoklát (retrospective exhibition of paintings and Nezabudice routes)
- 1958: Prague, Purkyně gallery (paintings from the years 1931–1957)
- 1967: Castle Kačina in Kutná Hora (together with Franz Prosecký)
- 1968: Ohrada with Deep (collected exhibition Pictures from Podještědi)
- 1977, Prague, New Hall Gallery (paintings from the years 1928–1976)
- 1978: Přerov, gallery Work
- 1978: Klášterec nad Ohří, Culture House Gallery (paintings from the years 1930–1977)
- 1981: Kladno
- 1983: Prague, Gallery U Řečických (selection of paintings from years 1925–1982)
- 1985: Mutějovice, in cooperation with Rabasova gallery
- 1987: Rakovník, Rabasova gallery

=== Posthumous exhibition ===
- 2003: Prague gallery Peithner
- 2011: Velenice
- 2011: Rakovník, Rabasova galerie

== Publications ==
- BARUCH, Joey; SOLAR, Josef : Fourteen new book marks of Jožko Baruch (= Collection Exlibris . Vol. 2). Graphic Arts, Prague 1941. OCLC 72421268

== Drawings ==
- Křička, Peter : White shield. The second book of poems . Kvasnička a Hampl, Praha 1944. OCLC 724911514
