= Watzke =

Watzke is a German-language surname. Notable people with the surname include:

- Hans Watzke (1932–2014), German politician
- Hans-Joachim Watzke (born 1959), German entrepreneur and football CEO
- Helen Slater (born 1963), American actress, married name Helen Watzke
- Josef Vacke (1907–1987), Czech artist
- King Watzke (1872–1919), American violinist and bandleader
- Rudolf Watzke (1892–1972), German operatic and concert singer
