= Karel Hubáček =

Czech architect (1924–2011)

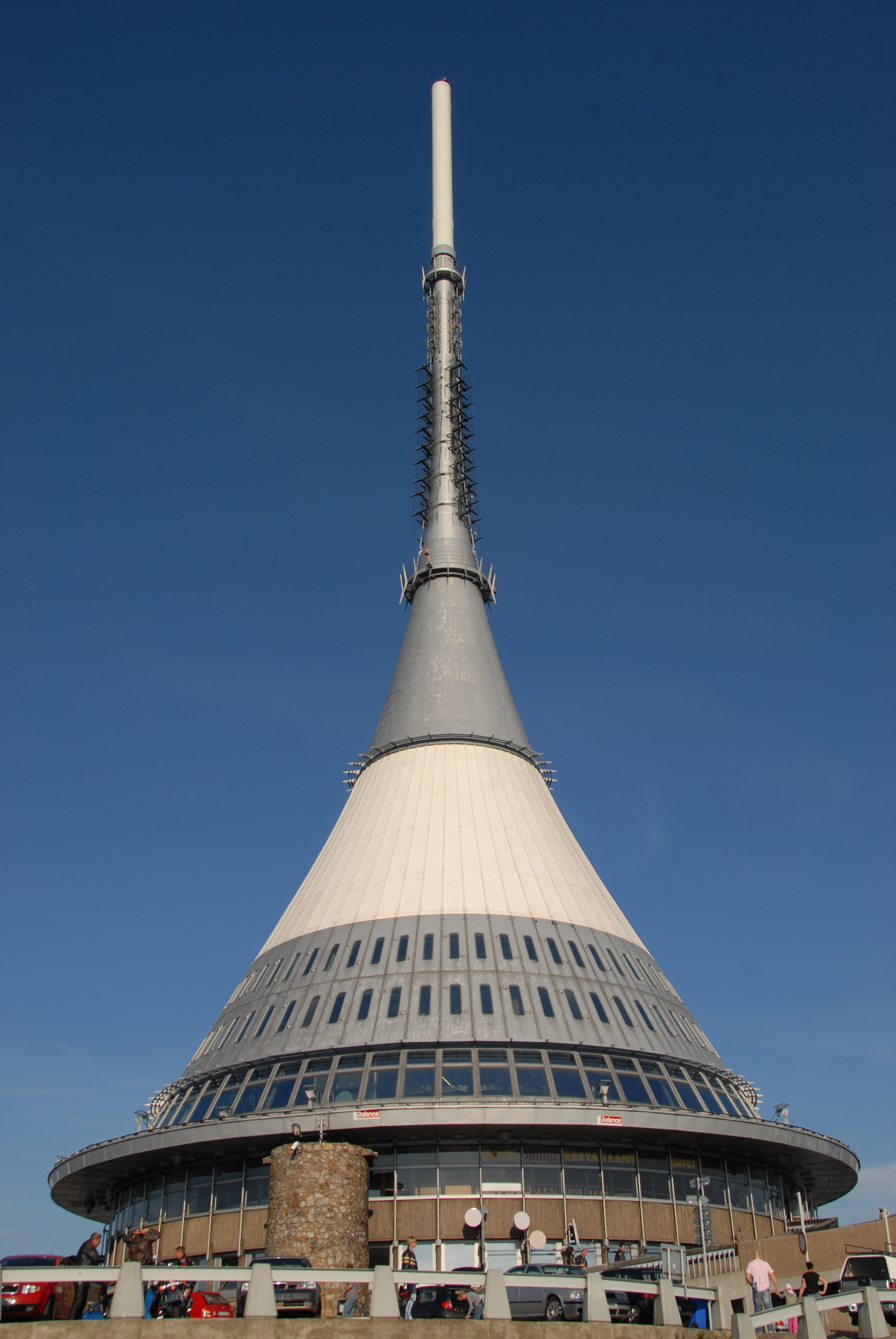
The Ještěd Tower, designed by Hubáček

Karel Hubáček (Czech pronunciation: [ˈkarɛl ˈɦubaːtʃɛk]; 23 February 1924 – 25 November 2011) was a Czech architect who designed the Ještěd Tower and hotel atop the Ještěd mountain near Liberec.

Hubáček's best known work was the Ještěd Tower, which was constructed between 1966 and 1973. In 1969, the Ještěd Tower received the Perret Prize from the International Union of Architects. In 2000, Czech architects named Hubáček's tower most successful domestic architectural work of the 20th century.

In addition to the Ještěd Tower, Hubáček designed buildings throughout the Czech Republic. Czech architects named Hubáček the fourth most influential Czech architect of all time. He was the only living architect to place in the top ten in the same survey.

Hubáček was born in Prague, Czechoslovakia, on 23 February 1924. He died in the Czech Republic on 25 November 2011, at the age of 87.
