= Jiří Svoboda (ANO politician, born 1959) =

Czech politician (born 1959)

Mayor of České Budějovice
- In office 2014–2022

Personal details
- Born: 24 November 1959 (age 66) Pardubice, Czechoslovakia
- Party: ANO

Jiří Svoboda (born 24 November 1959) is a Czech politician from the ANO party. He was mayor of České Budějovice.
