= Ještěd cable car =

Cable car in the Liberec region of Czechia

Coordinates: 50°44′6.61″N 15°0′2.39″E

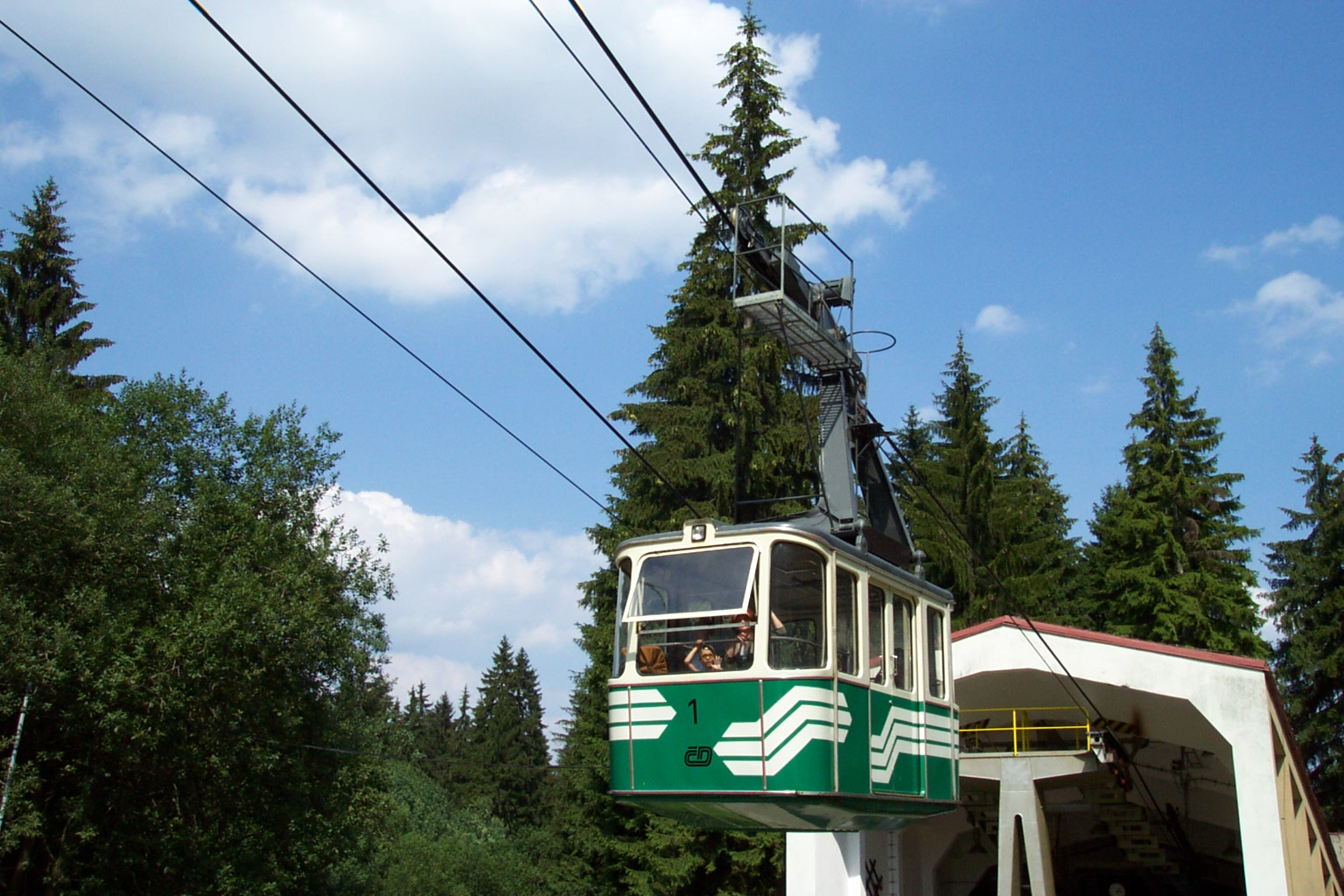
Lower station

The Ještěd cable car is an aerial cable car service in the Czech Republic, linking Horní Hanychov in the city of Liberec with the summit of Ještěd mountain. The cable car is operated by Czech Railways.

The cable car was opened in 1933, and was operated by Czechoslovak State Railways for most of its history. In the early 1970s the cable car was reconstructed. It was reopened in its current form in 1975. On 31 October 2021, a cabin crashed in an accident and one operator was killed. A further fourteen people, including one operator, had to be rescued from a second cable car by firefighters. The official report into the incident published in 2024 determined the cause of the accident to be the breaking of a haul rope and the prior illegal removal of an automatic brake.

The cable car usually operates on a daily basis according to a pre-set timetable but does not operate in adverse weather conditions. However, since the crash in 2021 the system has been closed indefinitely.
