= Grandhotel (novel) =

2006 novel by Jaroslav Rudiš

Grandhotel is a Czech novel, written by Jaroslav Rudiš. It was first published in 2006 and later in the year made into the film of the same name, directed by David Ondricek.
