= Ještěd =

Mountain peak in Liberec, Czech Republic

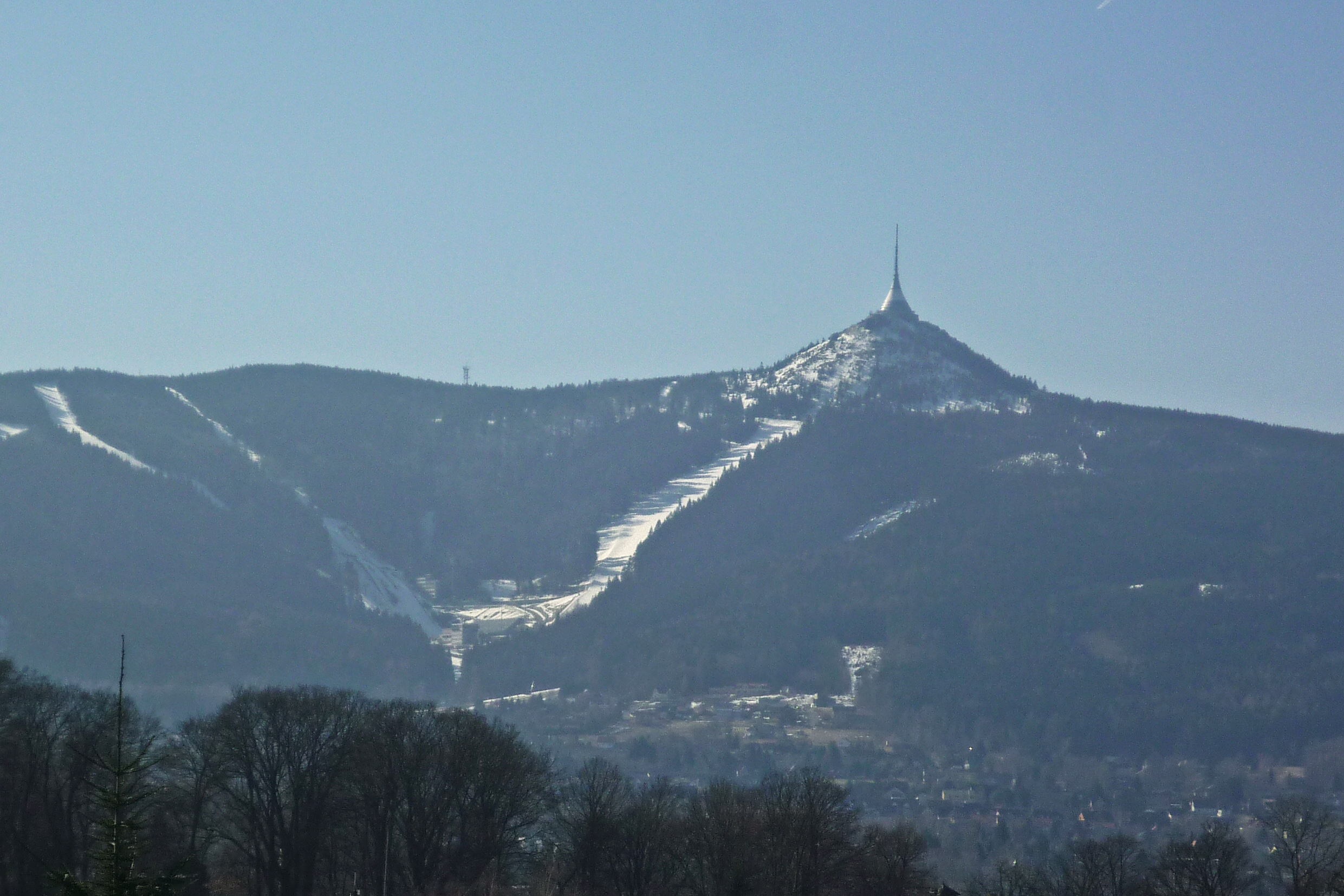

Highest point
- Elevation: 1,012 m (3,320 ft)
- Prominence: 517 m (1,696 ft)
- Isolation: 18 km (11 mi)
- Coordinates: 50°43′56″N 14°59′07″E

Geography
- Location within Czech Republic
- Location: Liberec
- Country: Czech Republic
- Parent range: Ještěd–Kozákov Ridge

Ještěd (Czech pronunciation: [ˈjɛʃcɛt]; German: Jeschken) is the highest mountain of the Ještěd–Kozákov Ridge in the north of the Czech Republic, at 1,012 m (3,320 ft). It is the symbol of the city of Liberec.

On the summit is the Ještěd Tower restaurant, hotel and television tower, designed by Karel Hubáček, accessible by road. The Ještěd cable car from Horní Hanychov has been out of service since an accident in October 2021, in which one of its cabins fell and the attendant on board was killed. The mountain also has a ski resort. From the summit there are views to Germany and Poland.

== Etymology ==
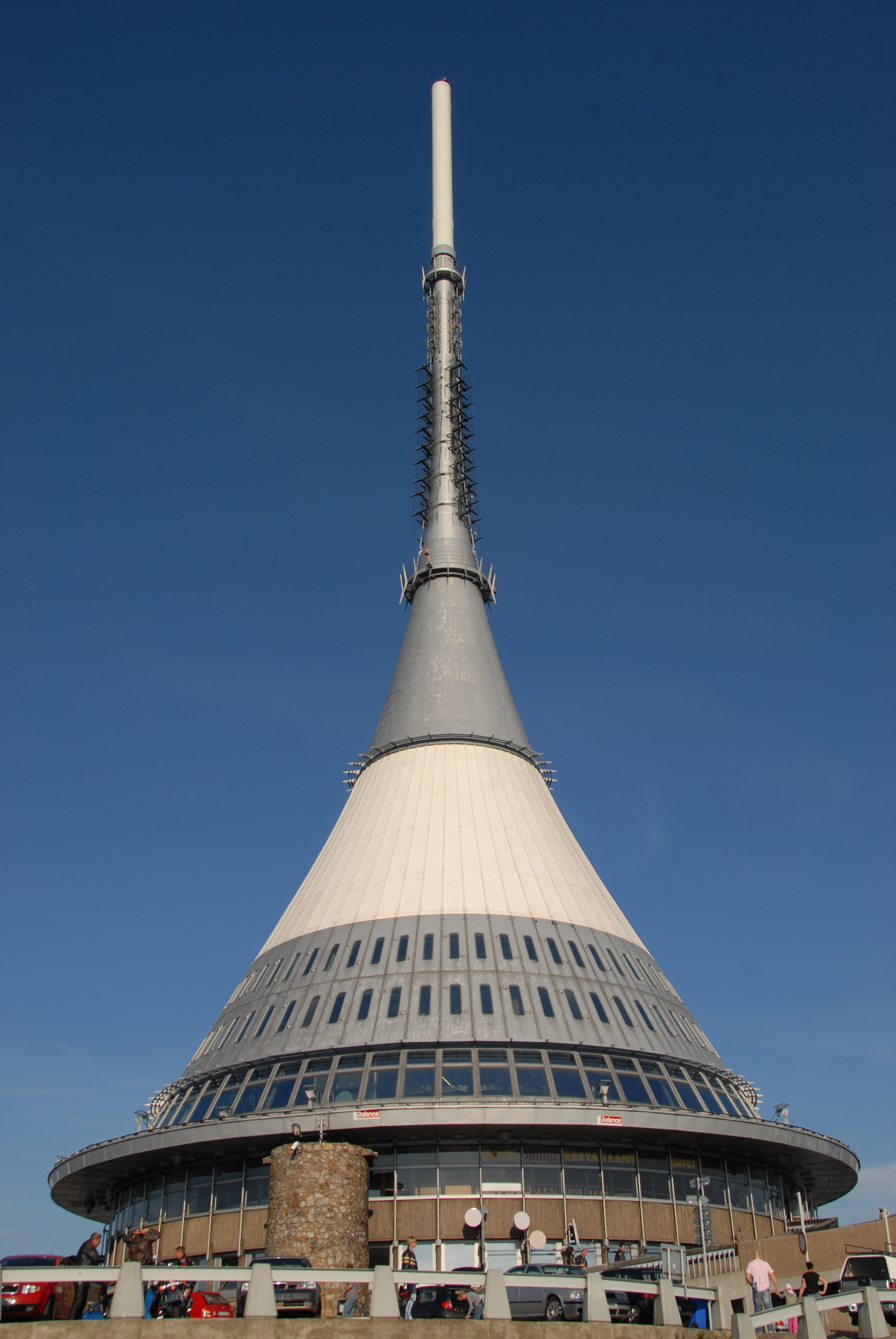
Ještěd Tower

The name was probably derived from the connection of the Old German words ask and ket, meaning "ash hill" or "ash forest". The Slavic name was created by gradual distortion. The Czech name for the mountain was first recorded in 1545 as Jesstied. The German form of the name, Jeschken, was first mentioned in 1565.

== Location ==
Ještěd above Liberec at sunset (2019)

Ještěd is the highest mountain of the Ještěd–Kozákov Ridge within the Bohemian Massif. The eastern slopes and the summit lie in the municipal territory of Liberec (Horní Hanychov part), the western slopes belong to the municipality of Světlá pod Ještědem.

== History ==
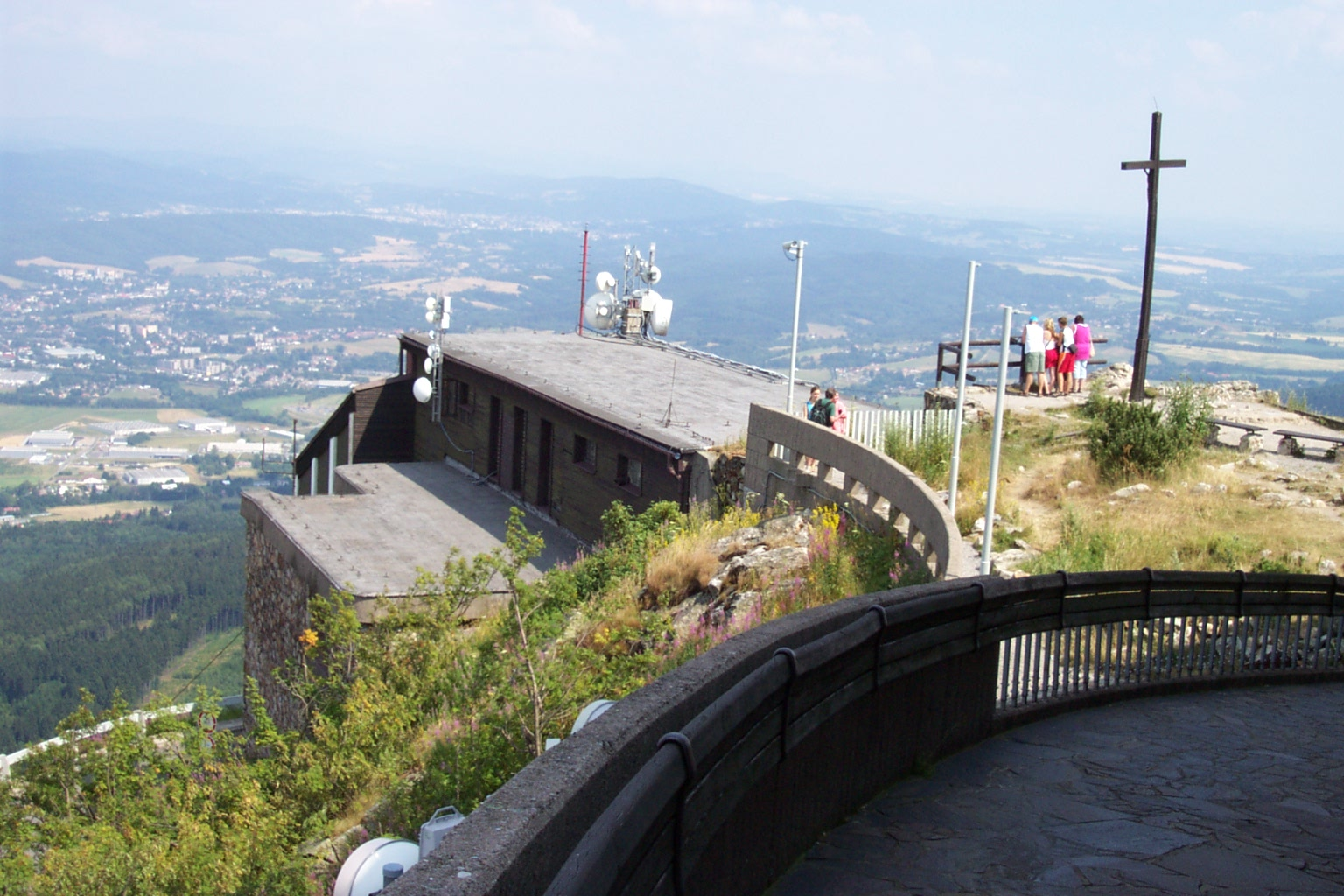
View of Liberec from the mountain

As far back as 1838 the summit hosted a crude stone that serves as a landmark to this day. The first hut on the summit was erected as early as 1844. In the 1860s, the mountain ridge was Station No. 4 of the first order of the Royal Saxon triangulation. For this reason a measuring station was built on the summit.

In 1906–1907, the German Mountain Association for the Ještěd and Jizera Mountains built a mountain hotel on the summit. The cable car from Horní Hanychov to the summit was opened in 1933.

On 23 August 1940, at midnight, a Heinkel He 111 from the Second (Lion) Squadron (German: Löwengeschwader) from Lüneburg crashed into the mountain near the summit and tore a long swathe in the woods. This accident killed the four crew.

The old mountain hotel burned down in 1963.

Between 1966 and 1973, a futuristic hotel with a 94-metre-high television tower, the Ještěd Tower, was built to a design by the architect Karel Hubáček. In 1969, the design won the Auguste Perret Prize. The modern building acts as an observation tower, transmission tower, hotel and restaurant.

In 2009, an element of the Nordic World Ski Championships took place on Ještěd.

== The ski jumping hills ==
In Ještěd there are two ski jumping hills, The World Championships 2009 were hosted there. The K-134 and the K-90. Roman Koudelka has the hill record in the K-134, with 143 metres. Anssi Koivuranta jumped 106.5 metres in the K-90, which is the hill record on this hill.
