= Jiří Svoboda (architect) =

Czech architect, designer and university teacher

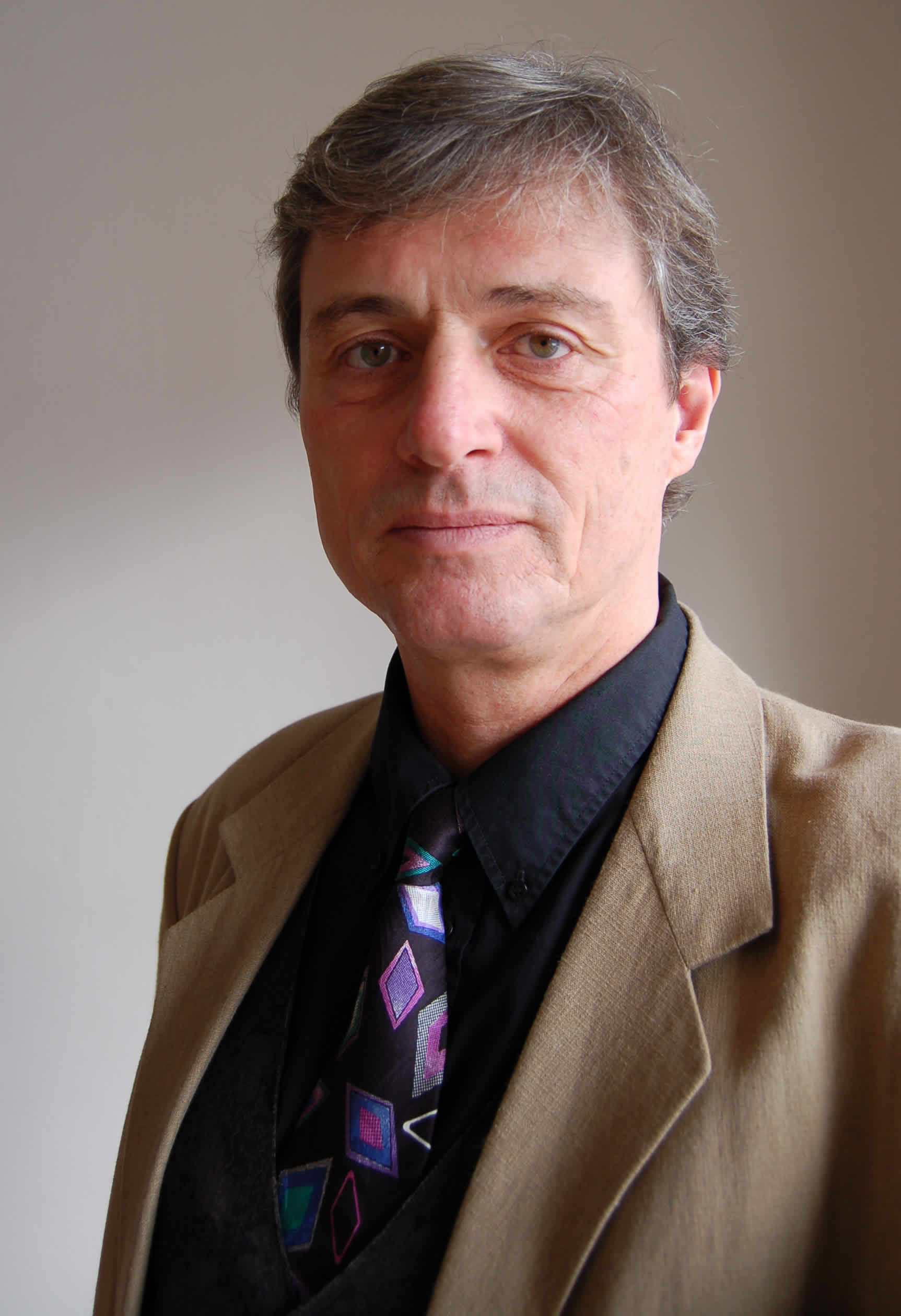
- Jiří Svoboda
- Born: 25 April 1961 (age 65); Ostrava, Czechoslovakia
- Occupations: architect, visual artist, teacher

Jiří Svoboda (born 25 April 1961) is a Czech architect, designer, and university teacher. He specializes in research of the architectural history of Zlín.
