= Velenice (Nymburk District) =

- Municipality
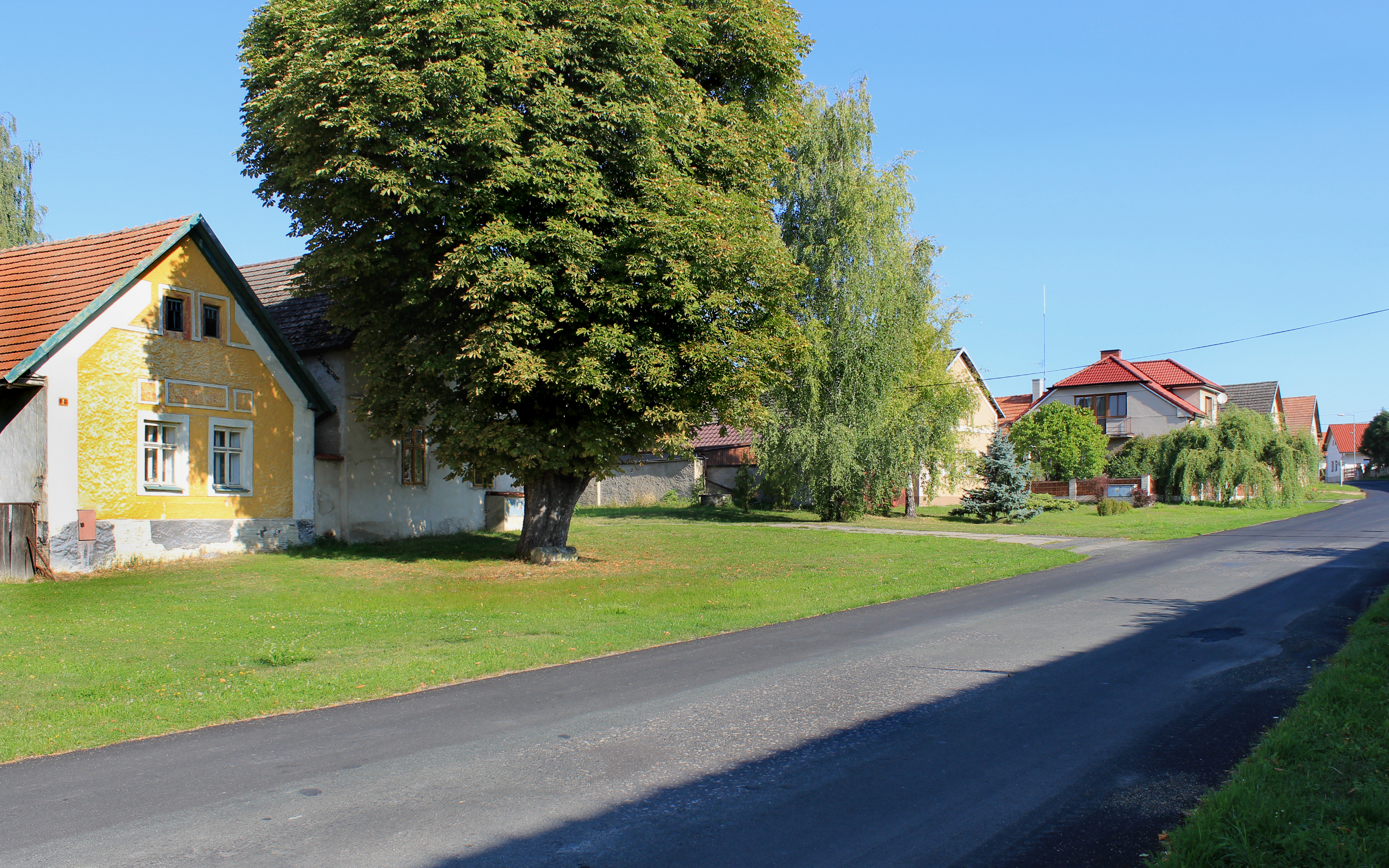
- Centre of Velenice

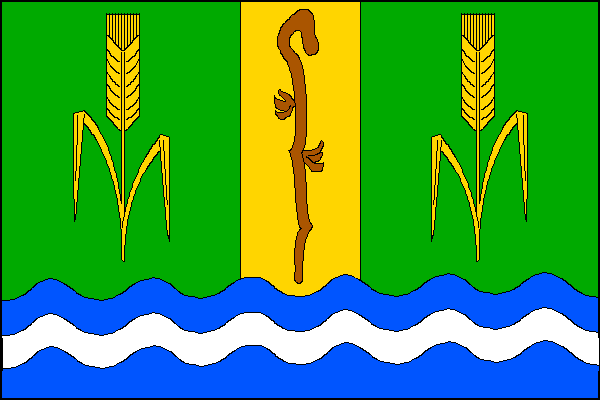
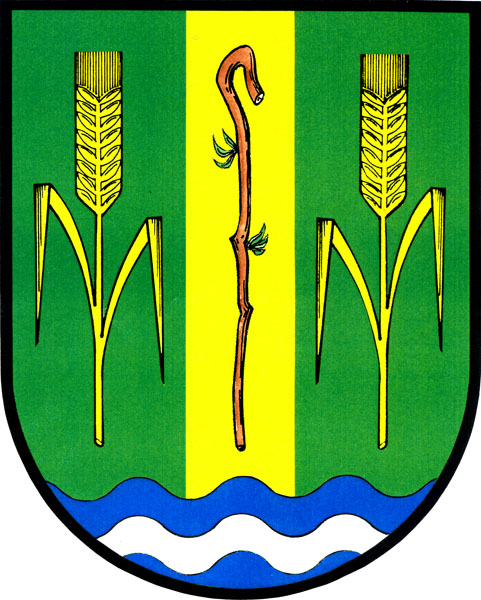
- Flag Coat of arms

- Location in the Czech Republic
- Coordinates: 50°12′52″N 15°13′35″E
- Country: Czech Republic
- Region: Central Bohemian
- District: Nymburk
- First mentioned: 1305

Area
  - Total: 8.02 km^{2} (3.10 sq mi)
- Elevation: 198 m (650 ft)

Population (2026-01-01)
  - Total: 222
  - Density: 27.7/km^{2} (71.7/sq mi)
- Time zone: UTC+1 (CET)
  - Summer (DST): UTC+2 (CEST)
- Postal code: 289 01
- Website: www.obec-velenice.cz

Velenice is a municipality and village in Nymburk District in the Central Bohemian Region of the Czech Republic. It has about 200 inhabitants.

== Demographics ==
Historical population
Year	Pop.	±%
1869	749	—
1880	752	+0.4%
1890	722	−4.0%
1900	623	−13.7%
1910	643	+3.2%
1921	620	−3.6%
1930	545	−12.1%
1950	370	−32.1%
1961	318	−14.1%
1970	267	−16.0%
1980	245	−8.2%
1991	244	−0.4%
2001	204	−16.4%
2011	214	+4.9%
2021	198	−7.5%
Source: Censuses
