= Ještěd–Kozákov Ridge =

Mountain range in the Czech Republic

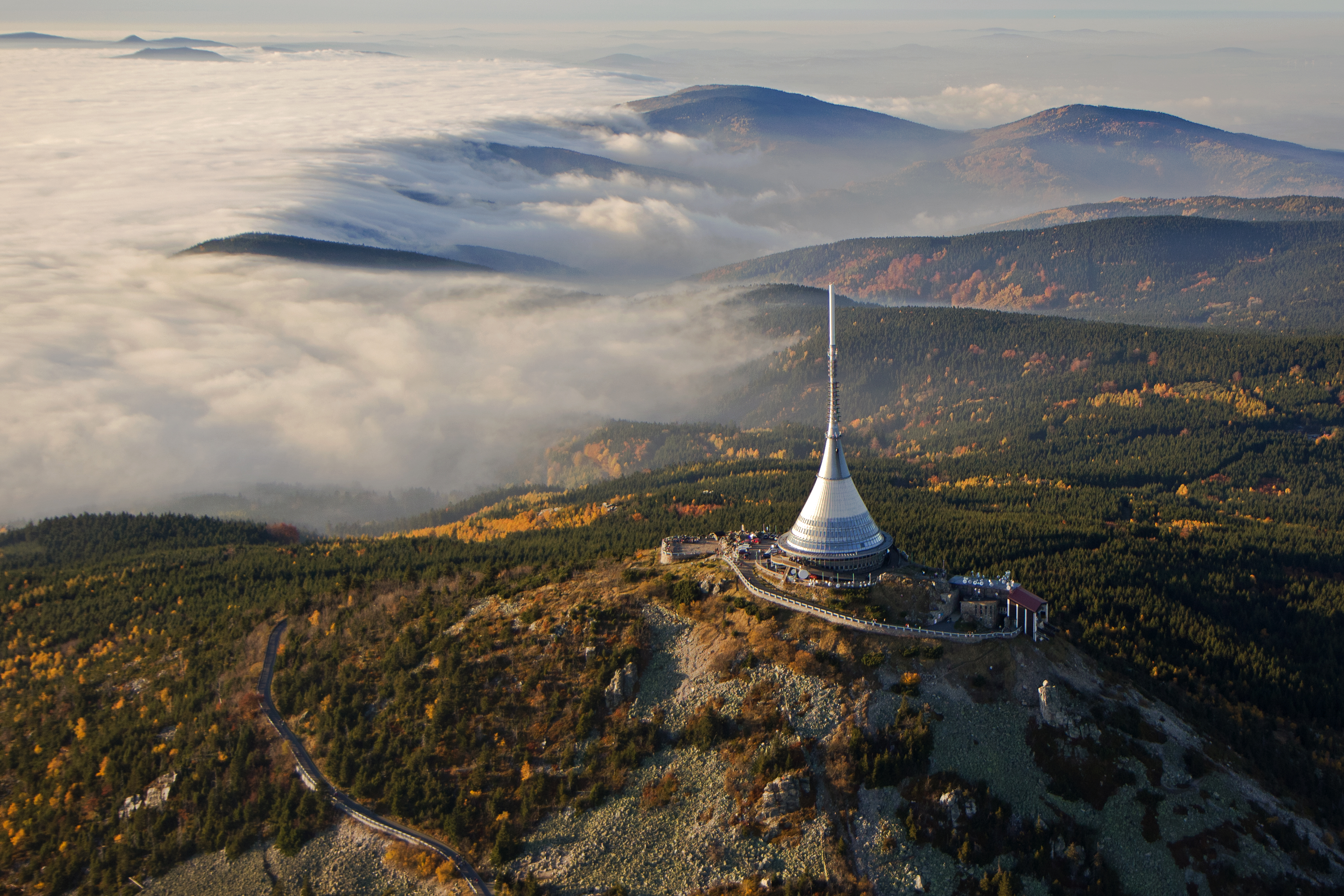
- Aerial view of Ještěd

Highest point
- Peak: Ještěd
- Elevation: 1,012 m (3,320 ft)

Dimensions
- Length: 58 km (36 mi)
- Area: 209 km^{2} (81 mi^{2})

Geography
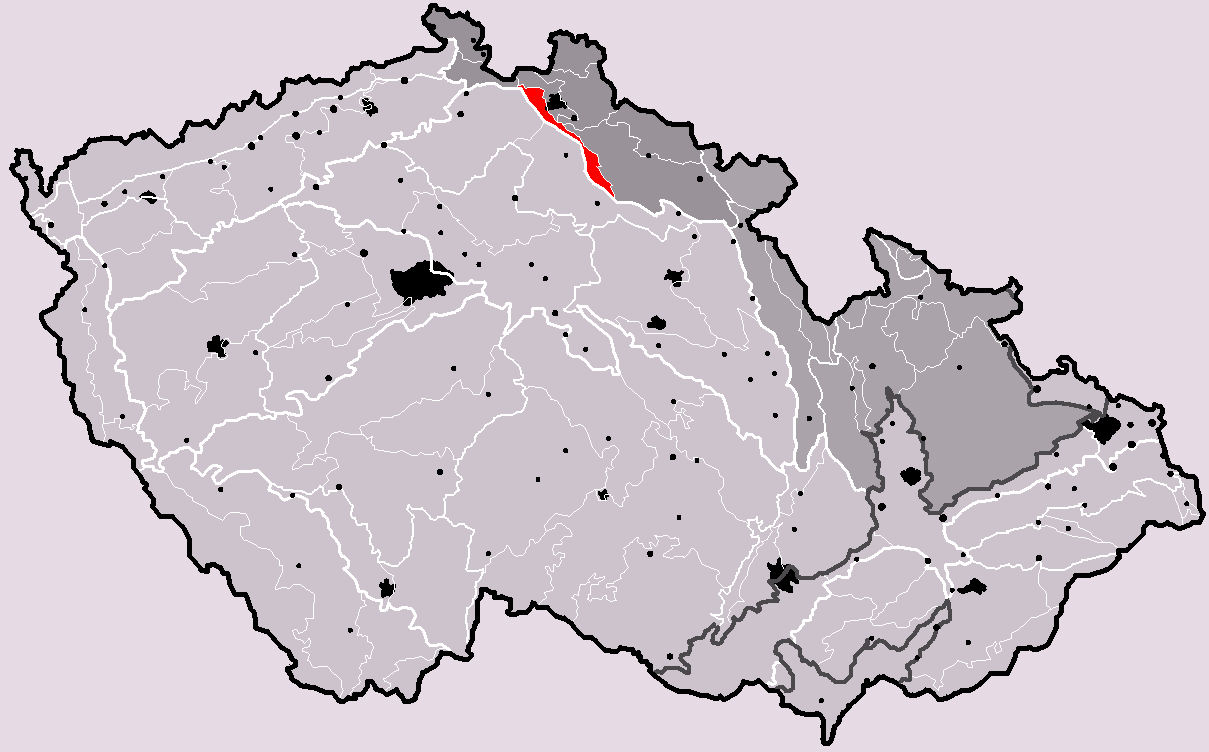
- Ještěd–Kozákov Ridge in the geomorphological system of the Czech Republic
- Country: Czech Republic
- Region: Liberec
- Range coordinates: 50°40′N 15°10′E
- Parent range: Western Sudetes

Geology
- Rock type(s): Sediment, metamorphic rock, volcanic rock

The Ještěd–Kozákov Ridge (Czech pronunciation: [ˈjɛʃcɛt ˈkozaːkof]; Czech: Ještědsko-kozákovský hřbet) is a ridge and geomorphological mesoregion of the Czech Republic. It is part of the Western Sudetes. The vast majority lies in the Liberec Region.

== Geomorphology ==
Ještěd–Kozákov Ridge is a mesoregion of the Western Sudetes, which is part of the Sudetes within the Bohemian Massif. It is a distinctive horst and anticline ridge. It is further subdivided into the microregions of Ještěd Ridge and Kozákov Ridge. Ještěd–Kozákov Ridge is named after the two highest and most dominant mountains of its two parts, Ještěd in the northwest part and Kozákov in the southeast.

Ještěd is the highest peak of the ridge and the only peak above 1,000 m. The highest peaks of the ridge are:

- Ještěd, 1,012 m (3,320 ft)
- Černý vrch, 950 m (3,120 ft)
- Hlubocký hřeben, 850 m (2,790 ft)
- Černá hora, 811 m (2,661 ft)
- Vápenný, 790 m (2,590 ft)
- Rozsocha, 767 m (2,516 ft)
- Malý Ještěd, 754 m (2,474 ft)
- Dlouhá hora, 748 m (2,454 ft)
- Kozákov, 744 m (2,441 ft)

== Geography ==
The ridge has a narrow elongated shape that extends from northwest to southeast. It is about 58 km (36 mi) long, and the width does not exceed 15 km (9 mi). The average altitude is 518.5 m. In the northwest it starts with the hill Ostrý vrch (511 m). The elevation of the hills gradually increases above 800 metres and culminates with Ještěd. The ridge is intersected by the deep valleys of the Mohelka and Jizera rivers.

The largest settlements whose territories extend into the ridge are Liberec, Semily, Chrastava and Lomnice nad Popelkou.

== Geology ==
The range mostly consists of various quartzites, though some parts are formed from sandstone.

The Kozákov mountain is known for the finds of olivines and gemstones.

== Nature ==
Almost the entire Ještěd Ridge is covered by forest up to the valley of Mohelka. The other part is a mosaic consisting of forests, meadows and fields. Most notable are beech forests, often protected as nature reserves. The central part of the ridge (including the Kozákov mountain) intersects the Bohemian Paradise Protected Landscape Area. The northernmost tip of the ridge with the Ostrý vrch hill is protected as a part of the Lusatian Mountains Protected Landscape Area. In addition to several small-scale protected areas, the Ještěd and Maloskalsko nature parks have been created.

== Tourism ==
The terrain is suitable for hiking and cycling. Winter sports are limited by there being only intermittent snow. The most popular area for both downhill and cross-country skiing is centered on Ještěd.

== Gallery ==
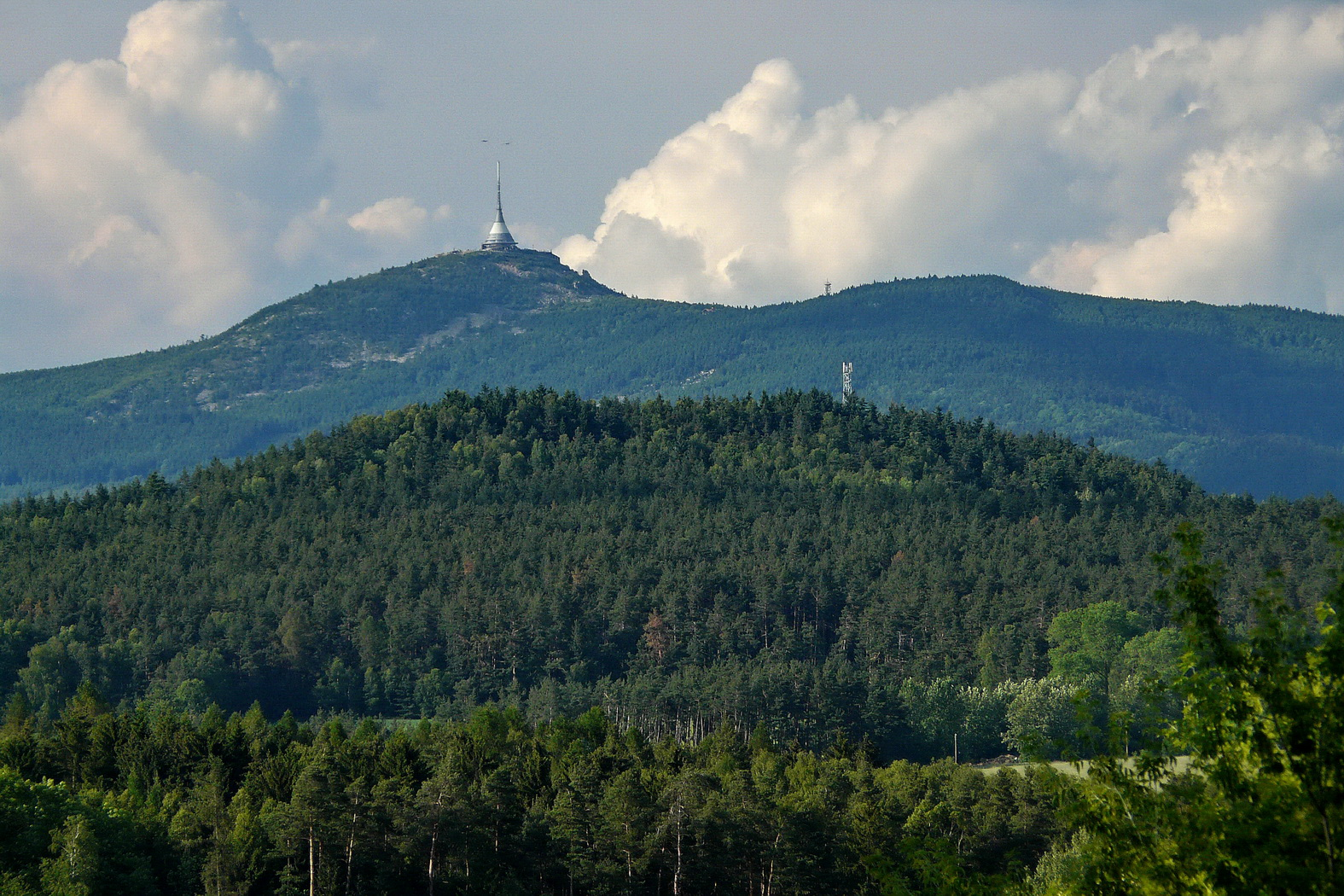
Ještěd and Černý vrch

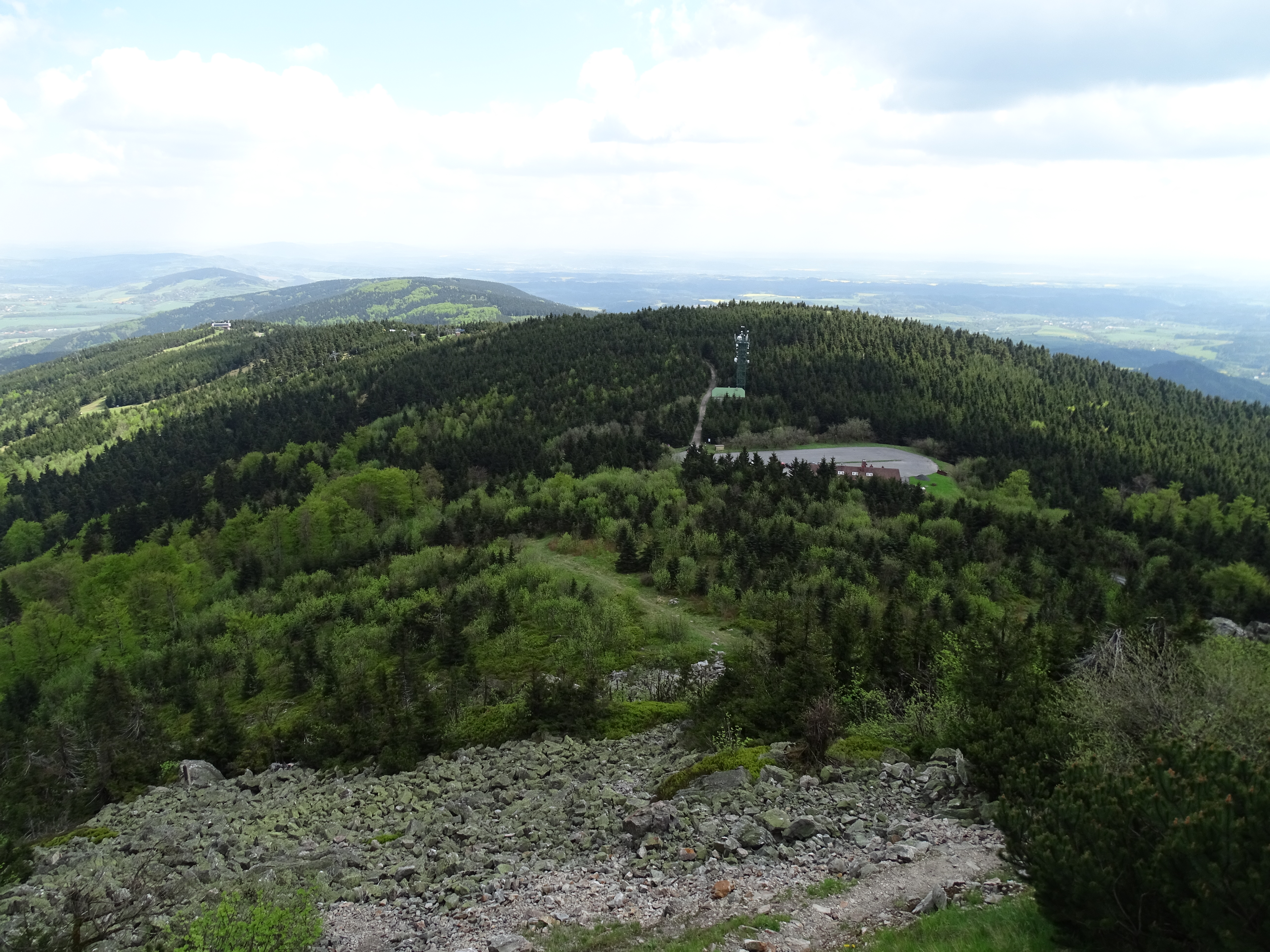
View from Ještěd towards Černý vrch and Hlubocký hřeben

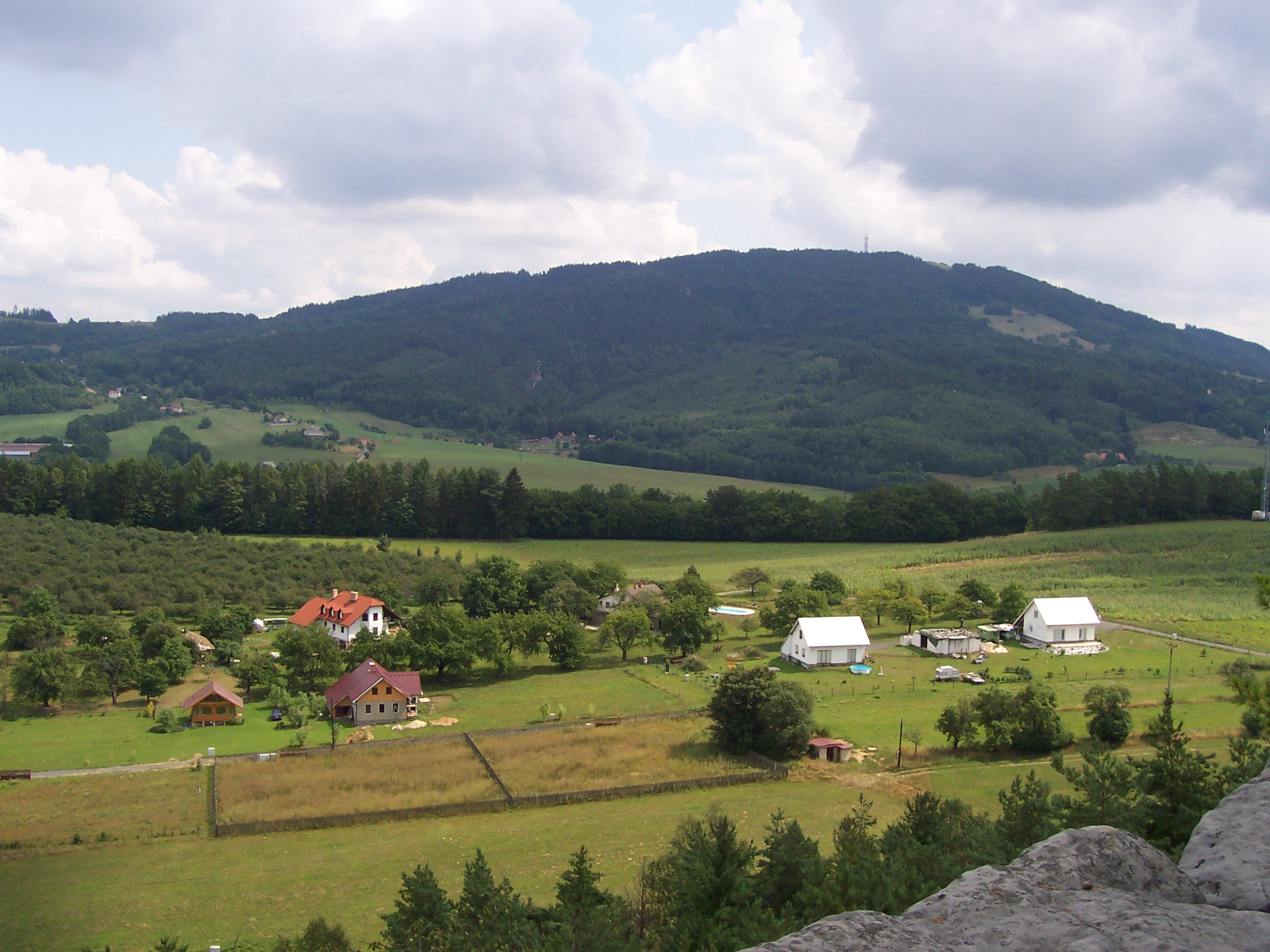
View towards Kozákov

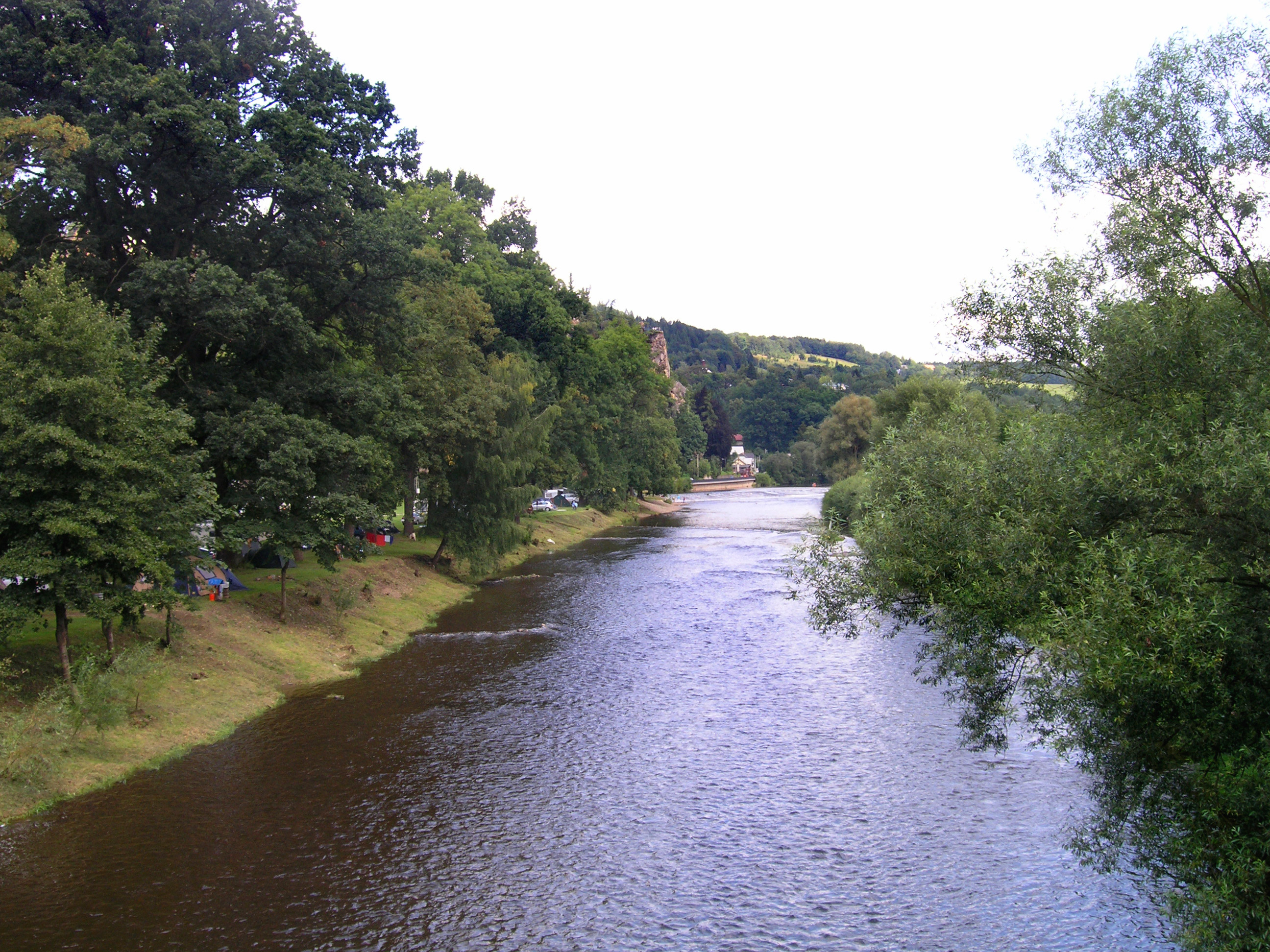
Jizera River in Malá Skála
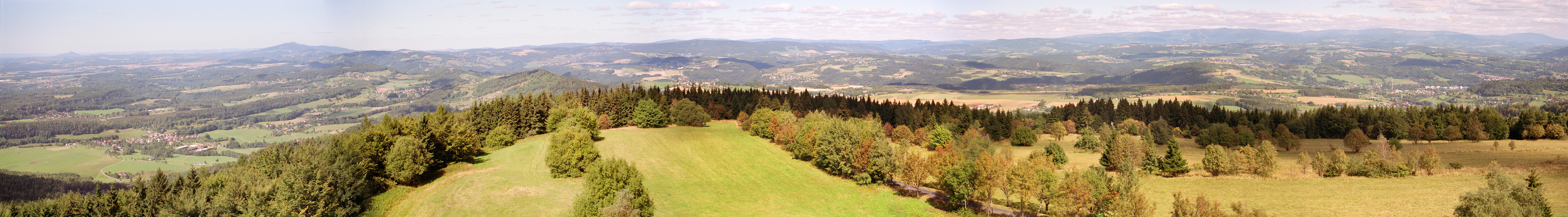
Panorama view from Kozákov
