= Lefler =

Lefler is a surname of Austrian origin. Notable people with the name include:

- Doug Lefler, American film director, screenwriter, film producer and storyboard artist
- Franz Lefler (1831–1898), Austrian painter
- Heinrich Lefler (1863–1919), Austrian painter, graphic artist and stage designer
- John Lefler (born 1975), American songwriter, singer, guitarist, and pianist
- Wade Lefler (1896–1981), American baseball player
