= Liberec =

City in the Czech Republic

- Statutory city
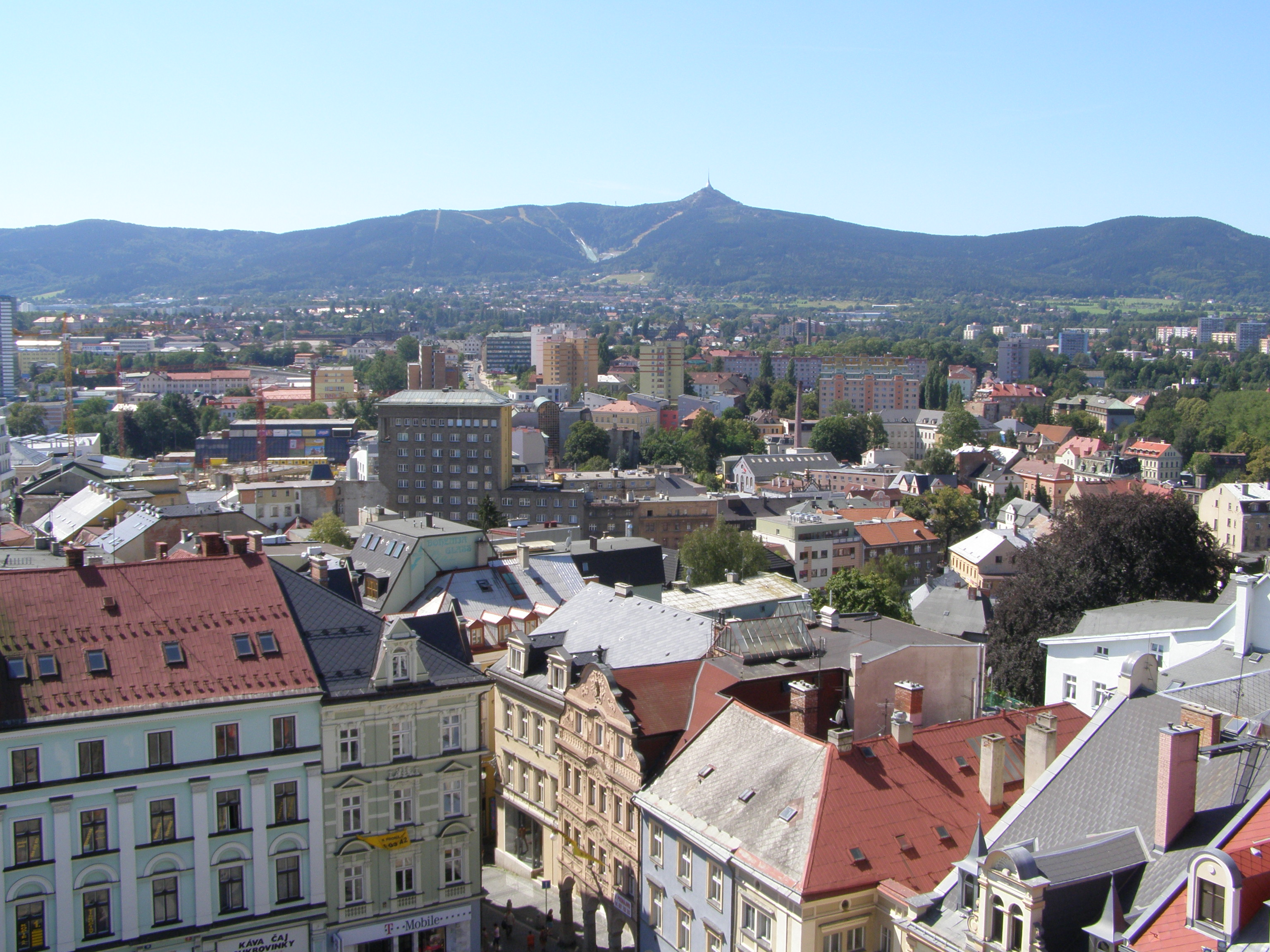
- View from the city hall tower

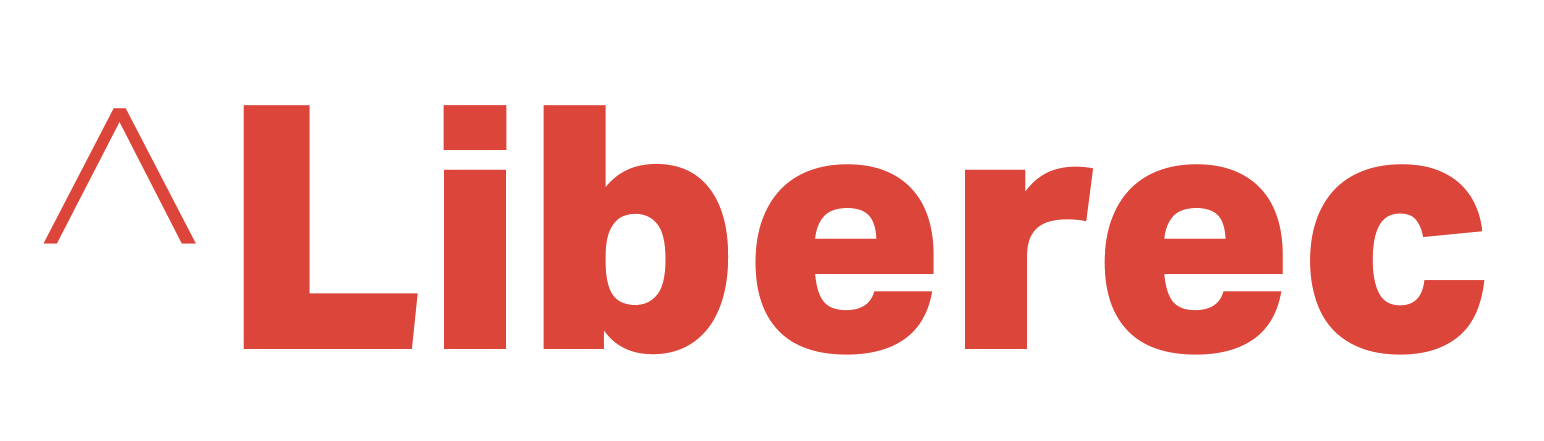
- Flag Coat of arms Wordmark

- Location in the Czech Republic
- Coordinates: 50°46′N 15°4′E
- Country: Czech Republic
- Region: Liberec
- District: Liberec
- First mentioned: 1352

Government
  - Mayor: Lukáš Hájek (SLK)

Area
  - Total: 106.09 km^{2} (40.96 sq mi)
- Elevation: 374 m (1,227 ft)

Population (2026-01-01)
  - Total: 108,214
  - Density: 1,020.0/km^{2} (2,641.8/sq mi)
- Time zone: UTC+1 (CET)
  - Summer (DST): UTC+2 (CEST)
- Postal code: 460 01
- Website: www.liberec.cz

Liberec (Czech pronunciation: [ˈlɪbɛrɛts]; German: Reichenberg) is a city in the Czech Republic. It has about 108,000 inhabitants, making it the fifth largest city in the country. It lies on the Lusatian Neisse River, in a basin surrounded by mountains. The city centre is well preserved and is protected as an urban monument zone.

Liberec was once home to a thriving textile industry and hence nicknamed the "Manchester of Bohemia". A symbol of the city and the main landmark of the panorama of Liberec is the Ještěd Tower. Since the end of the 19th century, the city has been a conurbation with the suburb of Vratislavice nad Nisou and the neighbouring city of Jablonec nad Nisou.

== Administrative division ==
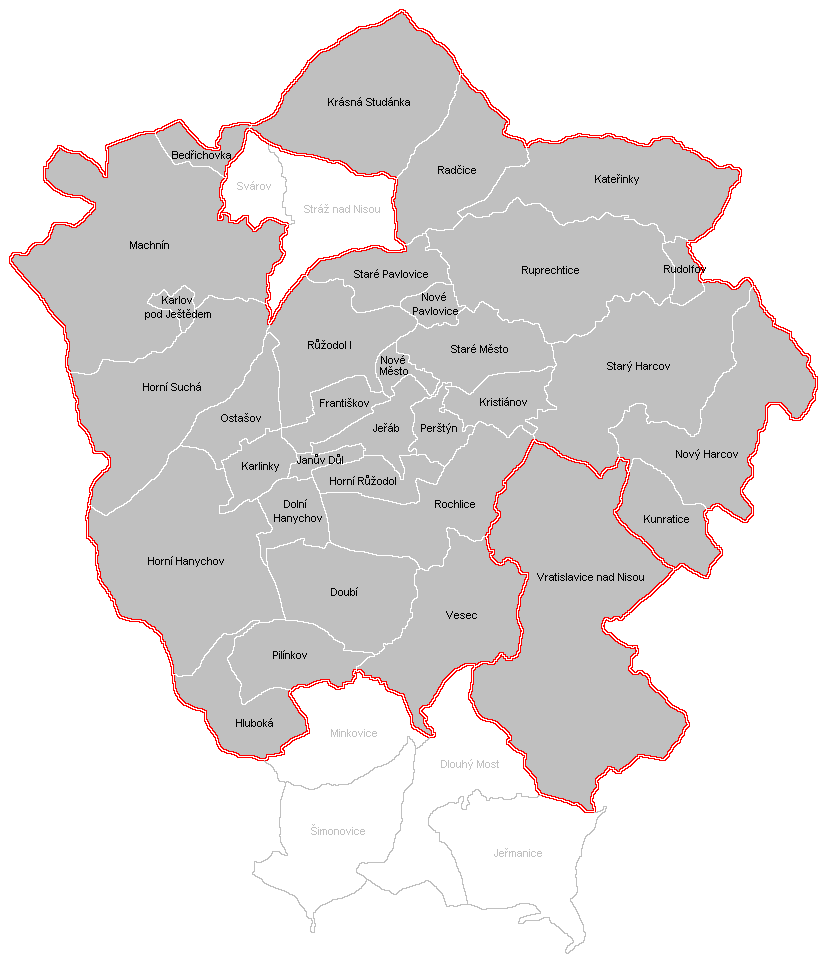
Municipal parts of Liberec

Liberec consists of 33 municipal parts (in brackets population according to the 2021 census):

- Liberec I-Staré Město (9,793)
- Liberec II-Nové Město (2,979)
- Liberec III-Jeřáb (5,657)
- Liberec IV-Perštýn (3,117)
- Liberec V-Kristiánov (5,312)
- Liberec VI-Rochlice (17,268)
- Liberec VII-Horní Růžodol (3,430)
- Liberec VIII-Dolní Hanychov (2,358)
- Liberec IX-Janův Důl (1,072)
- Liberec X-Františkov (3,676)
- Liberec XI-Růžodol I (2,281)
- Liberec XII-Staré Pavlovice (4,683)
- Liberec XIII-Nové Pavlovice (2,578)
- Liberec XIV-Ruprechtice (8,429)
- Liberec XV-Starý Harcov (7,090)
- Liberec XVI-Nový Harcov (377)
- Liberec XVII-Kateřinky (540)
- Liberec XVIII-Karlinky (539)
- Liberec XIX-Horní Hanychov (1,490)
- Liberec XX-Ostašov (672)
- Liberec XXI-Rudolfov (155)
- Liberec XXII-Horní Suchá (490)
- Liberec XXIII-Doubí (2,960)
- Liberec XXIV-Pilínkov (642)
- Liberec XXV-Vesec (4,622)
- Liberec XXVIII-Hluboká (21)
- Liberec XXIX-Kunratice (172)
- Liberec XXX-Vratislavice nad Nisou (8,935)
- Liberec XXXI-Krásná Studánka (967)
- Liberec XXXII-Radčice (704)
- Liberec XXXIII-Machnín (1,050)
- Liberec XXXIV-Bedřichovka (109)
- Liberec XXXV-Karlov pod Ještědem (172)

In the early 1990s, some parts became independent municipalities: Stráž nad Nisou (formerly Liberec XXVI-Stráž nad Nisou and Liberec XXVII-Svárov), Dlouhý Most (formerly Liberec XXXVI-Dlouhý Most), Jeřmanice (formerly Liberec XXXVII-Jeřmanice) and Šimonovice (formerly Liberec XXXVIII-Minkovice and Liberec XXXIX-Šimonovice).

Vratislavice nad Nisou is declared a self-governing borough, while the rest of the city is governed directly.

== Etymology ==
The oldest known names of the city are German, Reychinberch (1352) and Reychmberg (1369), meaning "rich/resourceful mountain" (reicher Berg in modern German). It was also spelled Reichenberg (1385–1399) and Rychmberg (1410).

The Czech equivalent originated as a distortion: Rychberk (1545), Libercum (1634), Liberk (1790), and finally Liberec (1845). In Czech, words starting with "R" were often dissimilated into "L". Since then, the city was known as Liberec in Czech and as Reichenberg in German.

== Geography ==
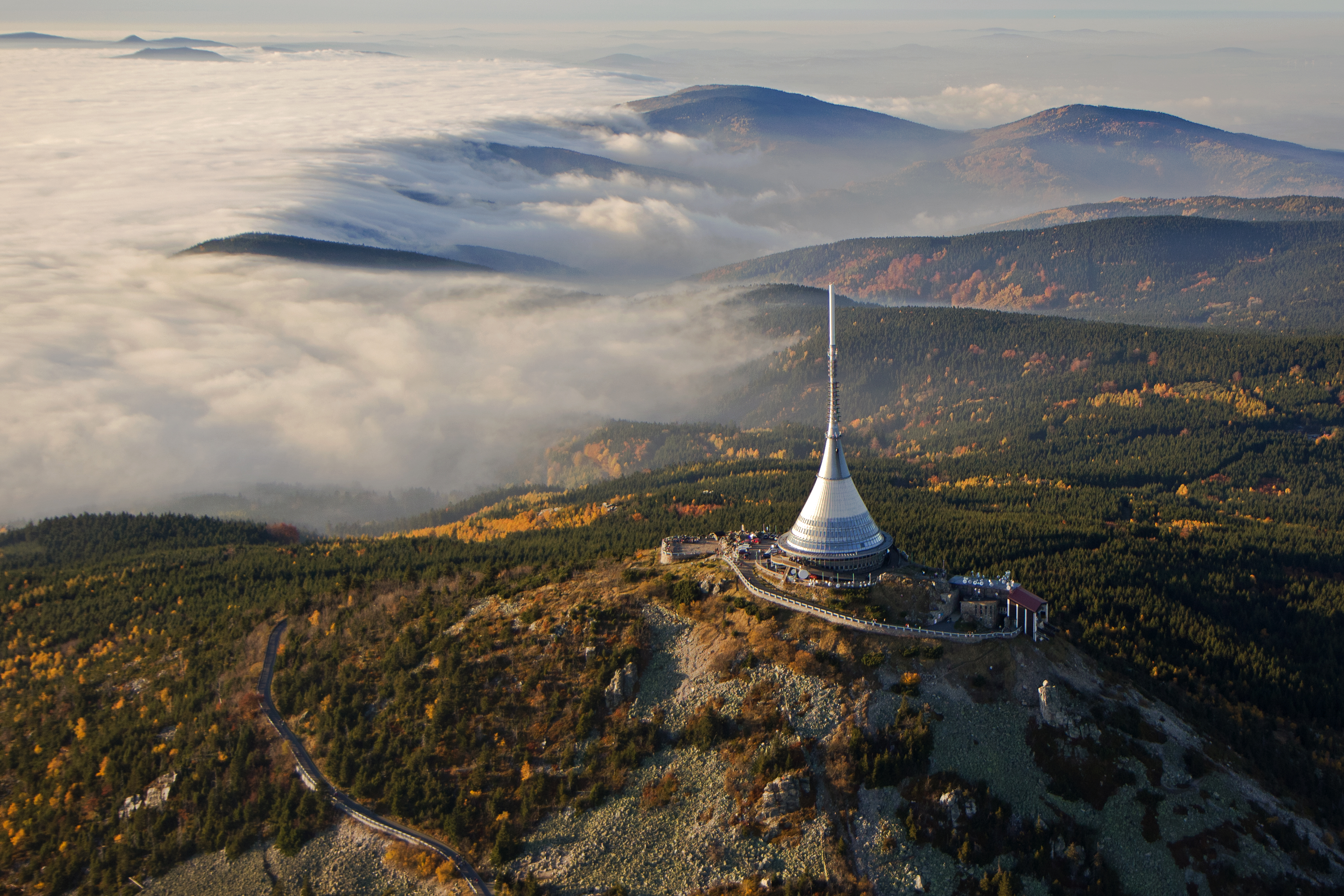
Ještěd mountain with the Ještěd Tower

Liberec is located about 80 kilometres (50 mi) northeast of Prague. Most of the municipal territory lies in the Zittau Basin. In the northeast, the territory extends into the Jizera Mountains and to the eponymous protected landscape area. In the west, the territory extends into the Ještěd–Kozákov Ridge and includes the highest point of Liberec and of the entire Ještěd–Kozákov Ridge, the mountain Ještěd at 1,012 m (3,320 ft) above sea level.

Liberec is situated on the Lusatian Neisse River. The largest body of water is Harcov Reservoir (also called Liberec Dam). The reservoir is located inside the built-up area on the Lusatian Neisse's tributary, the stream of Harcovský potok. Today it serves mainly as a recreational place for the residents of Liberec, but it was originally designed to protect the city from floods and as a water reservoir for industrial use. It is also important as a biotope with the occurrence of protected animals.

=== Climate ===
Liberec has a humid continental climate (Köppen: Dfb; Trewartha: Dcbo). The annual average temperature is 8.3 °C (46.9 °F), the hottest month in July is 18.0 °C (64.4 °F), and the coldest month is −1.2 °C (29.8 °F) in January. The annual precipitation is 845.3 millimetres (33.28 in), of which July is the wettest with 107.1 millimetres (4.22 in), while April is the driest with only 41.3 millimetres (1.63 in). The extreme temperature throughout the year ranged from −32.8 °C (−27.0 °F) on 11 February 1929 to 37.4 °C (99.3 °F) on 16 July 1928.

Climate data for Liberec (1991−2020 normals, extremes 1880-present)
Month	Jan	Feb	Mar	Apr	May	Jun	Jul	Aug	Sep	Oct	Nov	Dec	Year
Record high °C (°F)	15.6 (60.1)	17.1 (62.8)	21.5 (70.7)	28.4 (83.1)	30.2 (86.4)	34.4 (93.9)	37.4 (99.3)	35.9 (96.6)	32.2 (90.0)	25.4 (77.7)	19.1 (66.4)	14.8 (58.6)	37.4 (99.3)
Mean daily maximum °C (°F)	1.2 (34.2)	3.0 (37.4)	7.3 (45.1)	13.7 (56.7)	18.2 (64.8)	21.4 (70.5)	23.6 (74.5)	23.5 (74.3)	18.3 (64.9)	12.5 (54.5)	6.3 (43.3)	2.2 (36.0)	12.6 (54.7)
Daily mean °C (°F)	−1.2 (29.8)	−0.2 (31.6)	3.0 (37.4)	8.3 (46.9)	12.8 (55.0)	16.1 (61.0)	18.0 (64.4)	17.6 (63.7)	13.0 (55.4)	8.5 (47.3)	3.9 (39.0)	0.0 (32.0)	8.3 (46.9)
Mean daily minimum °C (°F)	−3.9 (25.0)	−3.6 (25.5)	−1.1 (30.0)	2.6 (36.7)	6.8 (44.2)	10.1 (50.2)	12.0 (53.6)	11.8 (53.2)	8.3 (46.9)	4.9 (40.8)	1.3 (34.3)	−2.5 (27.5)	3.9 (39.0)
Record low °C (°F)	−28.2 (−18.8)	−32.8 (−27.0)	−21.0 (−5.8)	−12.0 (10.4)	−4.6 (23.7)	−1.9 (28.6)	2.2 (36.0)	1.4 (34.5)	−2.4 (27.7)	−9.8 (14.4)	−17.0 (1.4)	−23.1 (−9.6)	−32.8 (−27.0)
Average precipitation mm (inches)	64.9 (2.56)	53.8 (2.12)	61.4 (2.42)	41.3 (1.63)	75.6 (2.98)	89.0 (3.50)	107.1 (4.22)	99.7 (3.93)	69.0 (2.72)	58.8 (2.31)	58.7 (2.31)	66.2 (2.61)	845.3 (33.28)
Average snowfall cm (inches)	32.0 (12.6)	29.2 (11.5)	17.8 (7.0)	2.8 (1.1)	0.0 (0.0)	0.0 (0.0)	0.0 (0.0)	0.0 (0.0)	0.0 (0.0)	1.1 (0.4)	10.1 (4.0)	26.7 (10.5)	119.8 (47.2)
Average precipitation days (≥ 1.0 mm)	12.9	11.0	11.7	8.3	10.8	11.2	11.6	10.3	9.8	9.9	10.9	12.5	130.9
Average relative humidity (%)	84.3	80.3	76.5	68.8	69.3	70.4	70.2	71.3	77.5	81.1	85.7	86.3	76.8
Mean monthly sunshine hours	44.0	67.9	117.0	177.8	210.2	208.1	222.7	216.6	155.3	104.4	40.2	34.4	1,598.6
Source 1: Czech Hydrometeorological Institute
Source 2: NOAA

== History ==
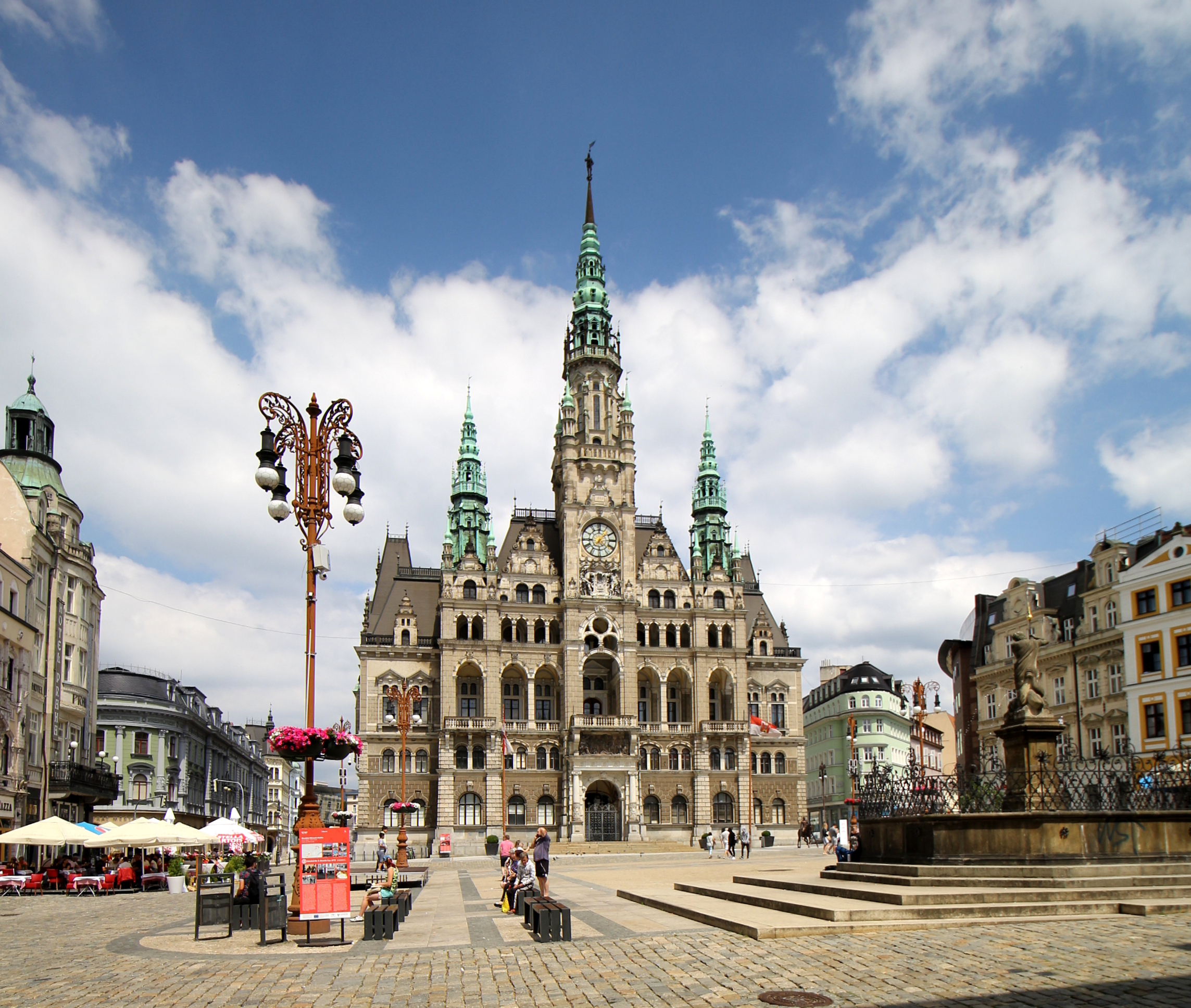
Liberec City Hall and Neptune's Fountain

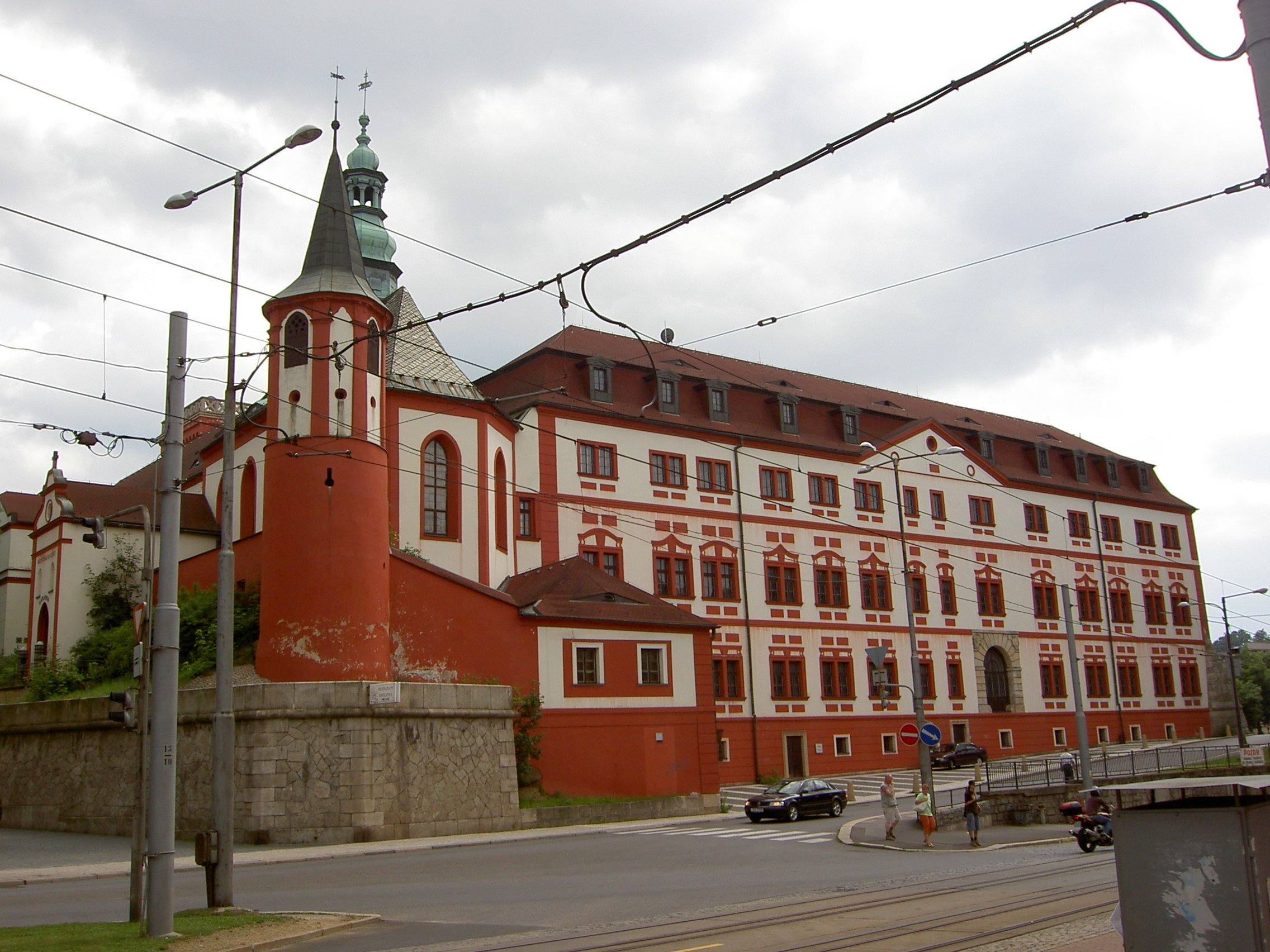
Liberec Castle

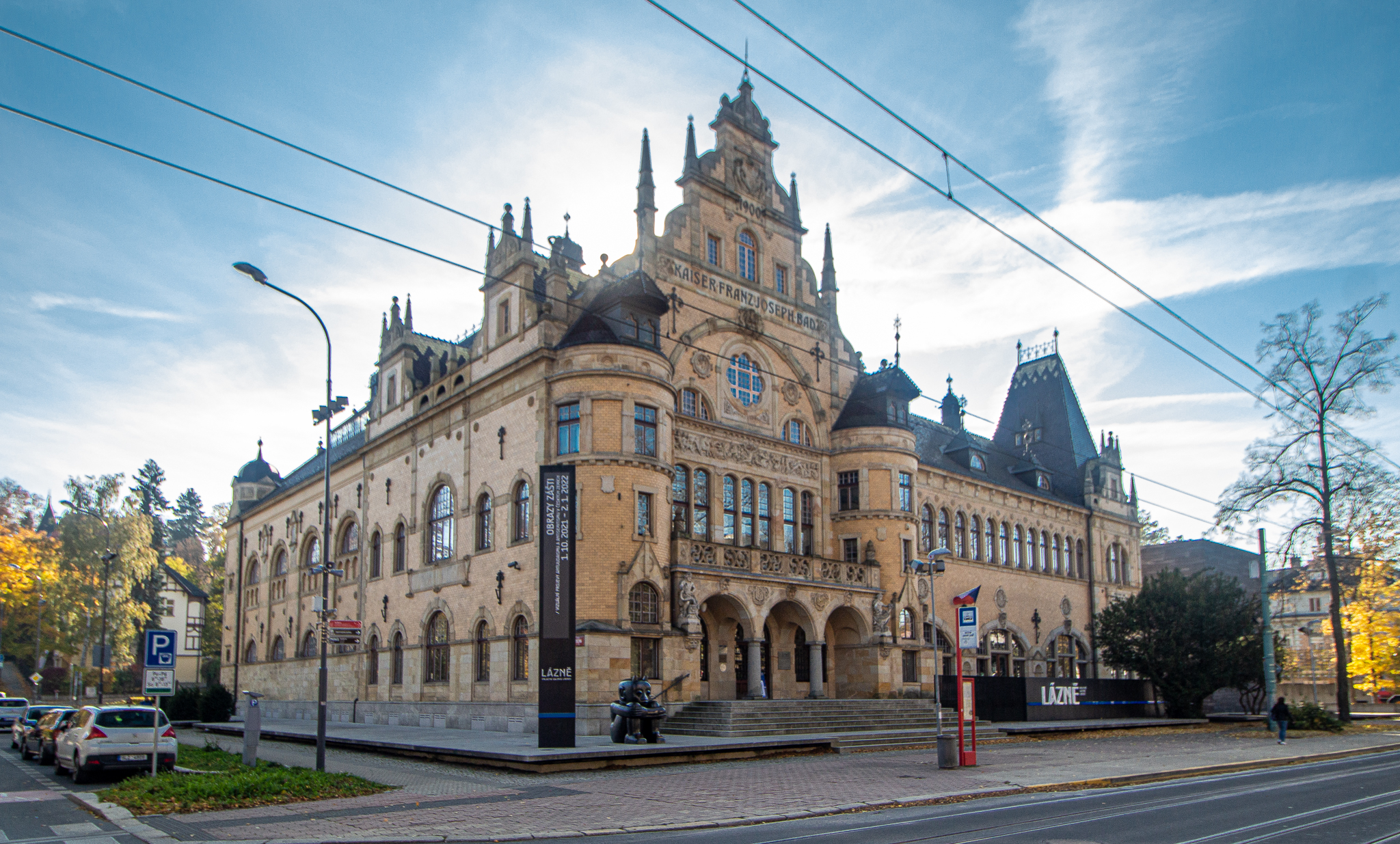
City spa, today the regional gallery

=== 11th–16th centuries ===
In the 11th or 12th century, a settlement named Habersdorf, which was the predecessor of Liberec, was established on the trade route from Bohemia to Lusatia by Czech settlers and German colonizers. In the 13th century, a second settlement named Reichenberg was established near the first one. The two settlements later merged. The first written mention of Liberec under its German name Reichenberg is from 1352.

Starting in 1278, the area was owned by the noble Bieberstein family. Reichenberg suffered from the passing through of troops during the Hussite Wars, then was burned down in 1469 during a battle with the army of King George of Poděbrady. After the Biebersteins died out, the Frýdlant estate, which included Reichenberg, was bought by the Redern family in 1558. The Rederns contributed significantly to the development of the settlement, as they built new buildings, modernized the settlement and laid the foundation of the textile industry. In 1577, Reichenberg was promoted to a town by Emperor Rudolf II. He gave the town the coat of arms it still uses today.

=== 17th–19th centuries ===
From 1600, the town was administered by Kateřina of Redern, who obtained the right to trade in salt for the town, had a chapel added to the castle and contributed to the construction of the town hall. When the Redern family was forced to leave Reichenberg after the Battle of White Mountain (1620), it was acquired by Albrecht von Wallenstein. After his death it belonged to the Gallas and Clam Gallas families, who did not care much about the town. The prosperous local industry was interrupted by the Thirty Years' War and a great plague in 1680. The crises resulted in a series of harshly suppressed serf uprisings.

In the 18th century, Reichenberg flourished. The number of inhabitants tripled and the cloth industry was very successful. The Battle of Reichenberg between Austria and Prussia occurred nearby in 1757 during the Seven Years' War, but the town continued to develop. During the 19th century, the town became the centre of textile industry for all of Austria-Hungary. In 1850, it became a self-governing city.

Reichenberg became a rich industrial city without representative buildings. In the late 19th century, a spectacular collection of representative buildings was created, mostly in the neo-Renaissance style: the city hall, the opera house, the North Bohemian Museum, the Old Synagogue, and others. A representative villa district and a forest with a botanical garden and a zoo were created.

=== 20th century ===
Until 1918, the city was part of Austria-Hungary, seat of the Reichenberg district, one of the 94 Bezirkshauptmannschaften in Bohemia. After the end of World War I, Austria-Hungary fell apart and the Czechs of Bohemia joined newly established Czechoslovakia on 29 October 1918 whilst the Germans wanted to stay with Austria to form reduced German Austria on 12 November 1918, both citing Woodrow Wilson's Fourteen Points and the doctrine of self-determination. Liberec was declared the capital of the German-Austrian province of German Bohemia. Czechs however argued that these lands, though German-settled since the Middle Ages, were historically an integral part of the Duchy and Kingdom of Bohemia. On 16 December 1918, the Czechoslovak Army entered Liberec and the whole province remained part of Bohemia.

The Great Depression devastated the economy of the area with its textile, carpet, glass and other light industry. The high number of unemployed people, hunger, fear of the future and dissatisfaction with the Prague government led to the flash rise of the populist Sudeten German Party (SdP), founded by Konrad Henlein, born in the suburbs of Liberec. The city became the centre of Pan-German movements and later of the Nazis, especially after the 1935 election, despite its important democratic mayor, Karl Kostka (German Democratic Freedom Party). The final change came in Summer 1938, after the radicalization of the terror of the SdP, whose death threats forced Kostka and his family to flee to Prague.

In September 1938, the Munich Agreement awarded the city to Nazi Germany. In 1939, it became the capital of Reichsgau Sudetenland. Most of the city's Jewish and Czech population fled to the rest of Czechoslovakia or were expelled. The important synagogue was burned down. Henlein himself confiscated a villa in Liberec that had belonged to a Jewish businessman, which remained Henlein's home until 1945.

After World War II, the city again became a part of Czechoslovakia and nearly all of the city's German population was expelled following the Beneš decrees. The region was then resettled with Czechs.

== Demographics ==
Historical population

Year	Pop.	±%
1869	50,252	—
1880	60,198	+19.8%
1890	68,135	+13.2%
1900	79,470	+16.6%
1910	89,312	+12.4%

Year	Pop.	±%
1921	84,845	−5.0%
1930	95,623	+12.7%
1950	69,663	−27.1%
1961	78,193	+12.2%
1970	84,046	+7.5%

Year	Pop.	±%
1980	95,924	+14.1%
1991	101,162	+5.5%
2001	99,102	−2.0%
2011	102,754	+3.7%
2021	104,340	+1.5%

Source: Censuses

== Economy ==
The largest employers with headquarters in Liberec and at least 1,000 employees are:

Economic entity	Number of employees	Main activity
Regional Hospital Liberec	4,000–4,999	Health care
Denso Manufacturing	2,000–2,499	Automotive industry
Magna Exteriors (Bohemia)	1,500–1,999	Automotive industry
Regional Police Directorate of the Liberec Region	1,500–1,999	Public administration
Technical University of Liberec	1,000–1,499	Education
Webasto Roof & Components Czech Republic	1,000–1,499	Automotive industry

The Liberec-Jablonec agglomeration was defined as a tool for drawing money from the European Structural and Investment Funds. It is an area that includes the cities of Liberec and Jablonec nad Nisou and their surroundings, linked to the cities by commuting and migration. It has about 227,000 inhabitants.

== Transport ==
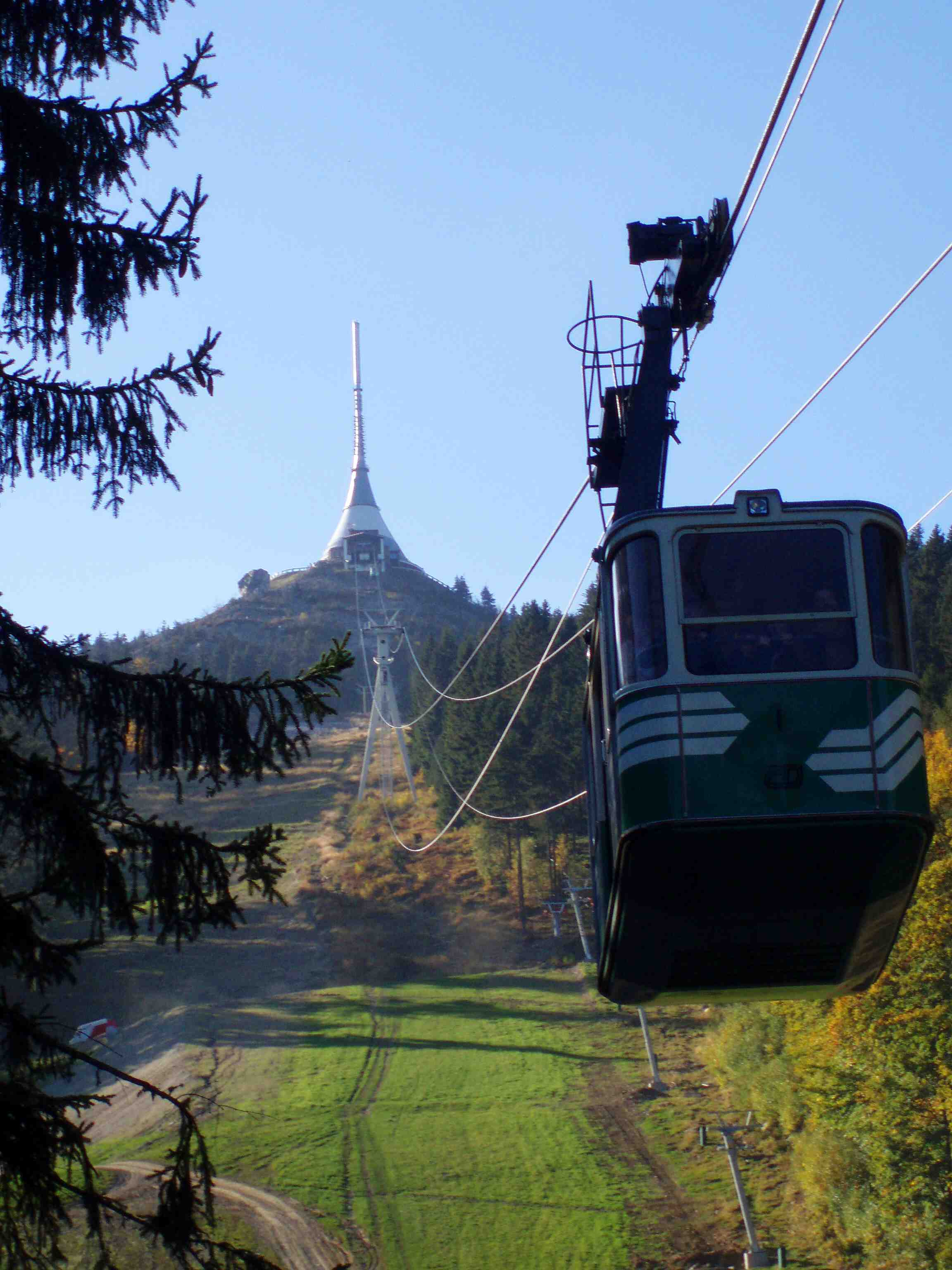
Cable car to Ještěd

Liberec city transport provides bus and tram lines. The first tram was used in Liberec in 1897. Liberec shares the 1,435 mm (4 ft 8 1/2 in) standard gauge tramway line which connects it to its neighbouring Jablonec nad Nisou. There are also two city lines with 1,435 mm (4 ft 8 1/2 in) standard gauge. The first connects Horní Hanychov (next to the cable car to Ještěd) and Lidové Sady via Fügnerova. The second connects Dolní Hanychov and Lidové Sady via Fügnerova (only during workdays). There are also four historical trams. In the city centre there are two tracks as a memorial; in the past trams were used also on the central place in front of the city hall.

The European route E442 passes through Liberec.

A private international airport is located in Liberec XX-Ostašov.

== Education and science ==
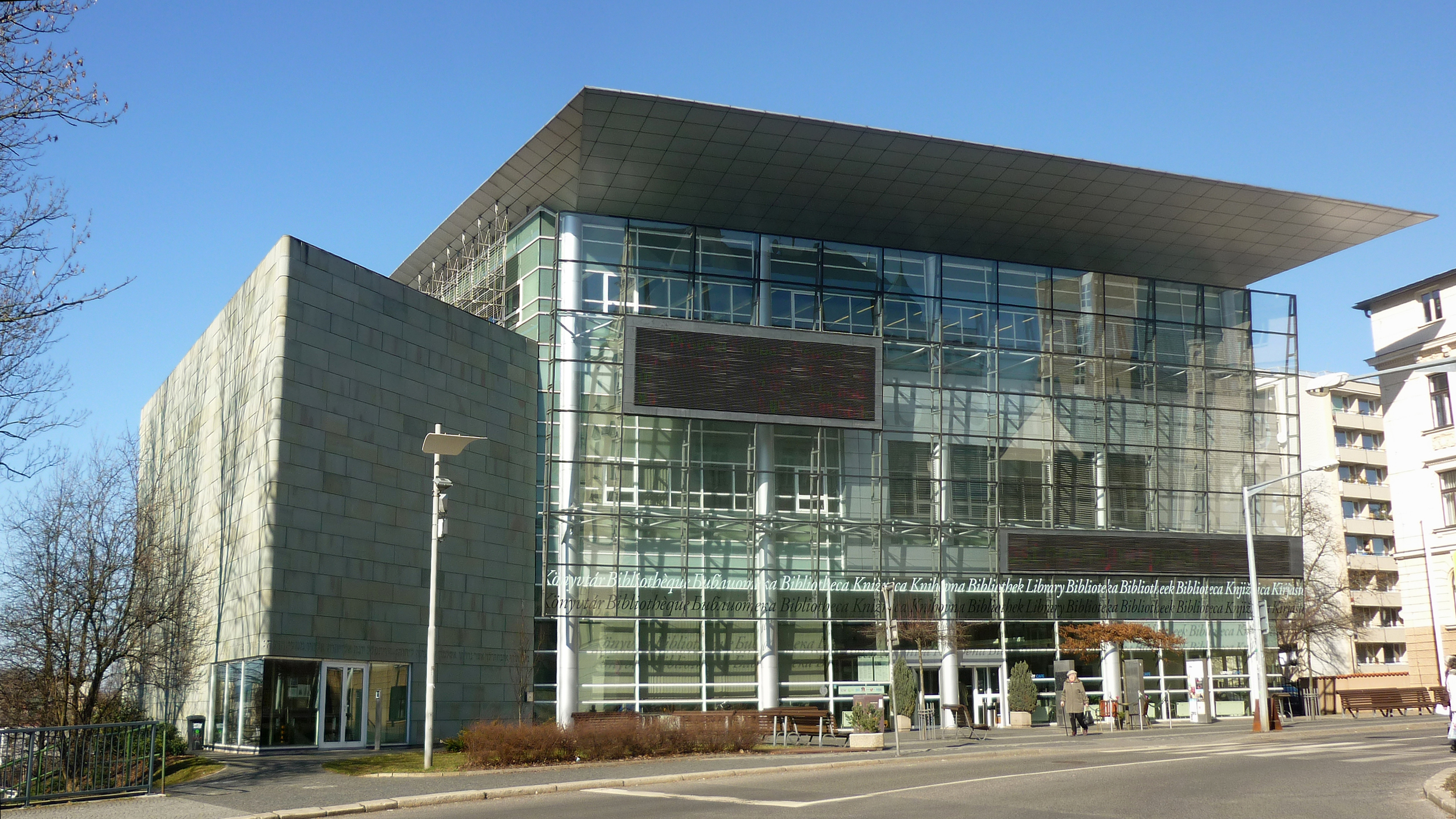
The Research Library and the New Synagogue

Technical University of Liberec was founded in 1953 as "University of Mechanical Engineering in Liberec", later being renamed in 1995, as it now offered a wider range of subjects. It is known especially for its research in the field of textile engineering. It has about 9,000 students in six faculties (Mechanical Engineering, Textile Engineering, Arts and Architecture, Mechatronics Informatics and Inter-Disciplinary Studies, Science-Humanities and Education, and Economics), and it also comprises the Institute for Nanomaterials, Advanced Technologies and Innovation.

Regional Research Library in Liberec is a general public science library, aiming at general education in the region. It was founded in 1900 after the municipal council decided to establish a municipal library, and hosts a large collection of Germano-Slavica and Sudetica (periodicals and books in German language from Bohemia). A new building on the site of the Old Synagogue, which was burnt down by the Nazis in November 1938, was completed in 2000 and also houses a modern New Synagogue.

== Culture ==
Mateřinka is a theatre festival held biennially in June.

Since 2020 Liberec has hosted Anifilm, an annual international festival of animated films.

== Sport ==
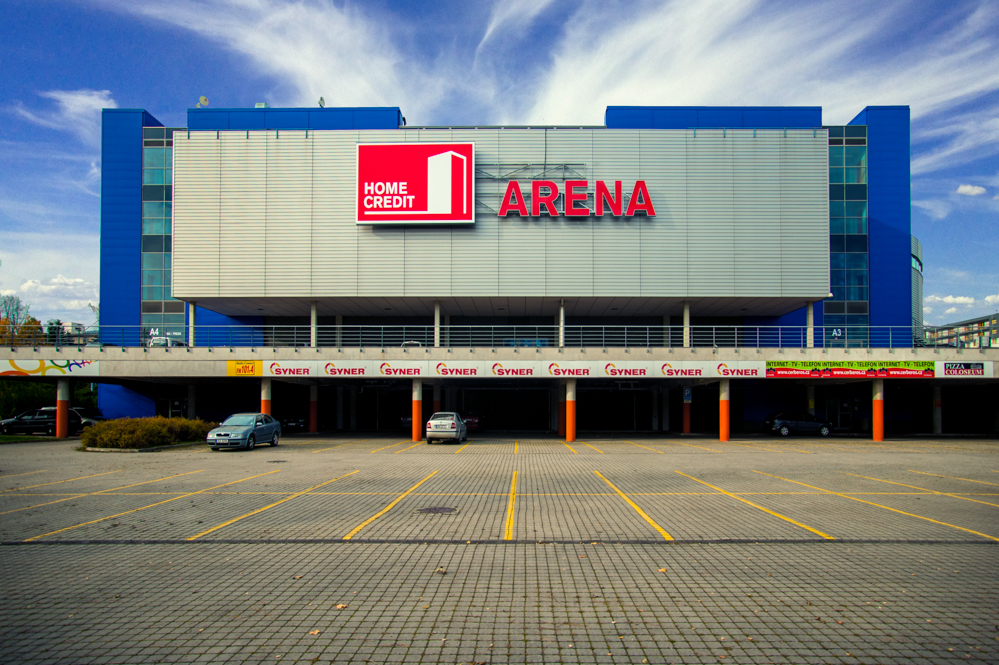
Home Credit Arena winter stadium

The city is home to FC Slovan Liberec, a football club founded in Liberec which plays in the Czech First League, the top tier. Slovan Liberec is one of the most successful clubs in the Czech Republic, having won three league titles. There is also SK VTJ Rapid Liberec. It plays in one of the lowest divisions.

The ice hockey team HC Bílí Tygři Liberec play in the Czech Extraliga, the national top tier. It plays in Home Credit Arena.

Liberec has hosted two European Luge Championships, having done so in 1914 and 1939. In 2009, it hosted the FIS Nordic World Ski Championships. The Ski Jumping World Cup always comes to Liberec in January. The World Karate Championships took place in May 2011.

In 2015, Liberec hosted the 2015 World Mountain Bike Orienteering Championships.

Motorcycle speedway takes place at the Pavlovický Stadion. It was built in 1930. The most important event that was run on it was the semi-final of the Under-21 World Championship in 2019. The team Start Gniezno Liberec race at the stadium.

== Sights ==
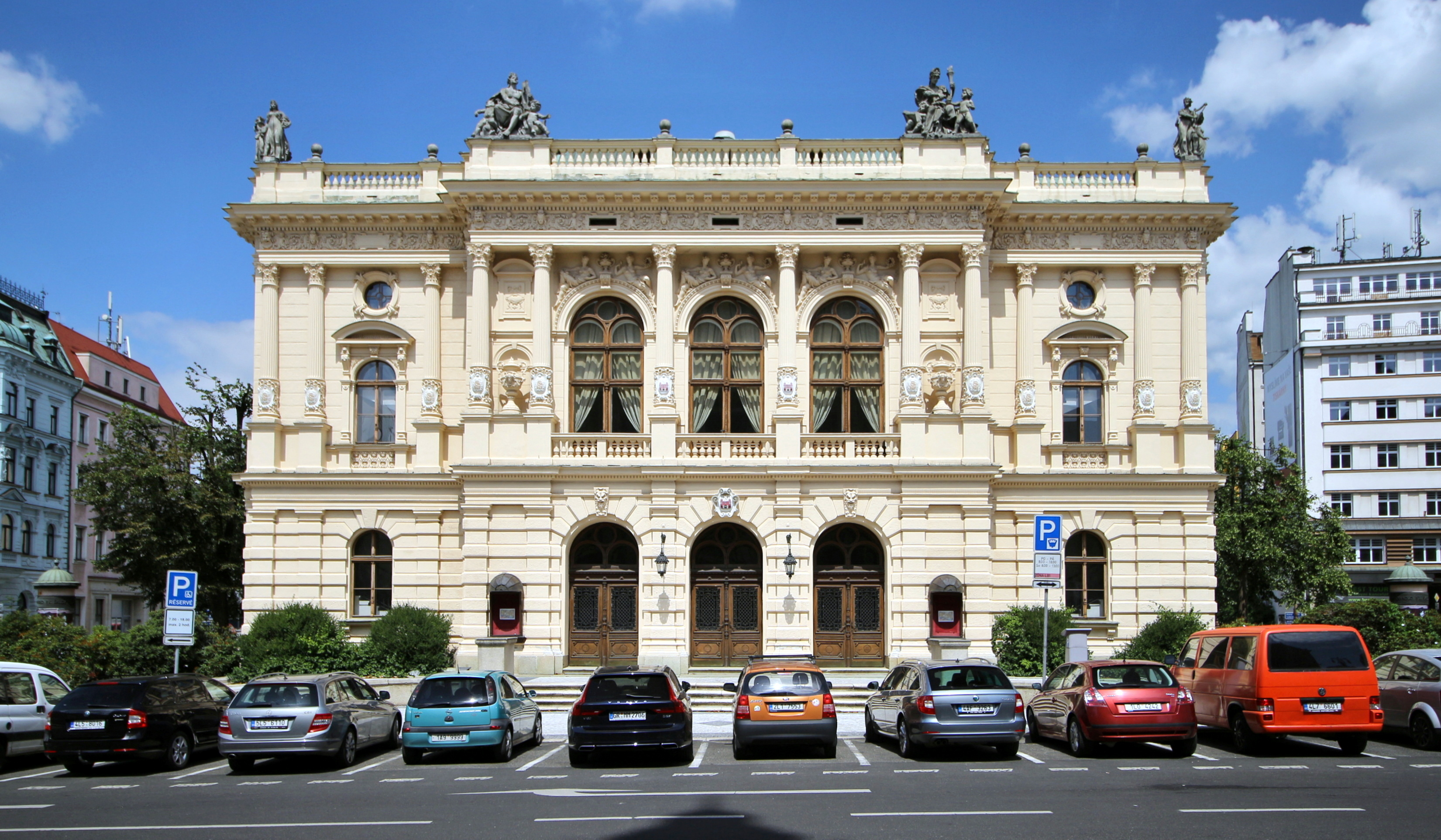
F. X. Šalda Theatre

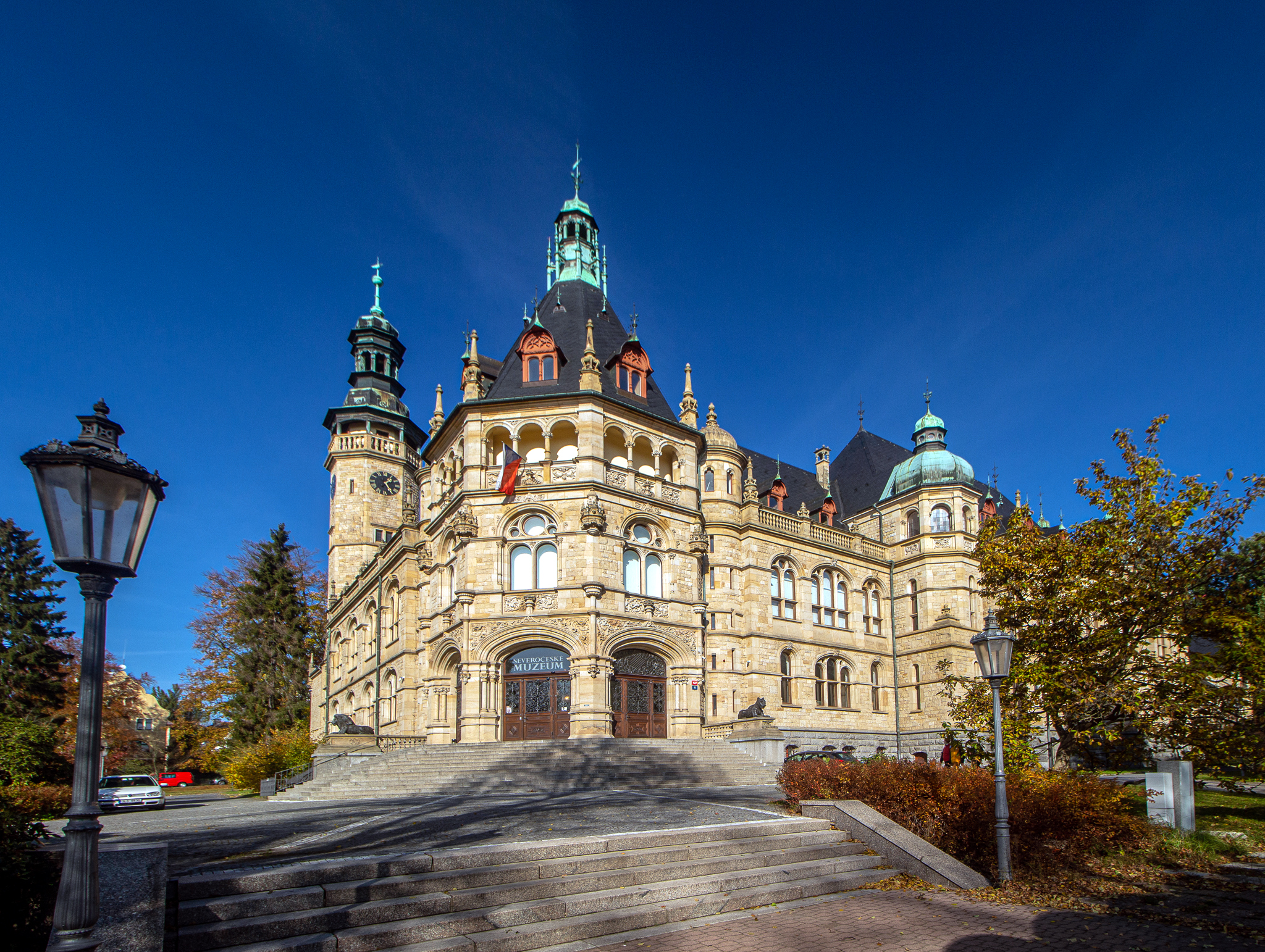
North Bohemian Museum

The main landmark and one of the symbols of the city is the Ještěd Tower on the Ještěd mountain, which is used as a transmitter, observation tower and hotel. It was built in 1966–1973 according to the design by the architect Karel Hubáček. It is the most important monument in the city, protected as a national cultural monument since 2006. The building has won many architectural awards and a poll for the most important Czech building of the 20th century.

Among the most valuable buildings of the city centre is the Liberec City Hall. It was built in the Neo-Renaissance style in 1888–1893, according to the design by Franz Neumann. It has three towers; the highest of them is 61 m (200 ft) high. In the summer season, the interiors and one of the towers are open to the public. Since 2024, it has been protected as a national cultural monument.

The Liberec Castle was built in several stages, the oldest part was built in the Renaissance style in 1582–1583. After World War II, it was in a state of disrepair, after which it was insensitively reconstructed and used by a glass manufacturer. The castle has not been used since 1997 and is gradually deteriorating.

A notable building is the F. X. Šalda Theatre. It was built in the Neo-Renaissance style in 1881–1883. A valuable element is the curtain with the theme Triumph of Love, made by Gustav Klimt, Ernst Klimt and Franz von Matsch.

The North Bohemian Museum was founded in 1873 as the first arts and crafts museum in the Czech lands. The current museum building dates from 1898. It was designed by the architect Friedrich Ohmann and built by Hans Grisebach in the romantic-historicist style. The building has a 41 m (135 ft) high tower, which is a replica of the Liberec City Hall tower.

Liberecká výšina is a significant landmark of the eastern part of the city. It is a restaurant with a 25 m (82 ft) high observation tower, built in the style of a medieval castle. It was built in 1900–1901 and its look is inspired by the watchtower of the Nuremberg Castle.

The most visited tourist destinations in the city are the Liberec Zoo, iQ Landia (a science centre) and Centrum Babylon (an entertainment centre which includes a large water park, amusement park, casino, shopping court and hotel).

=== Zoo and botanical garden ===
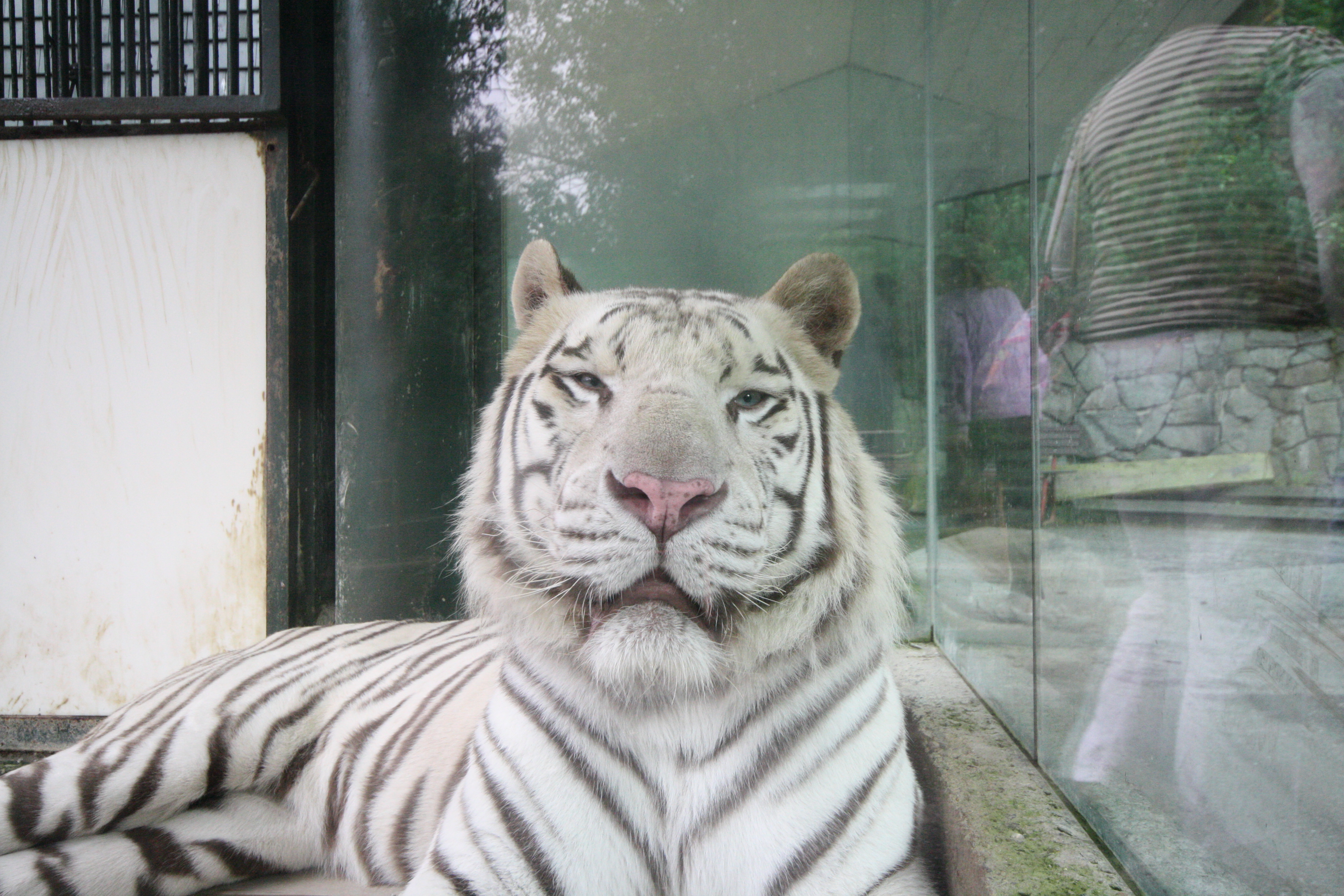
White tiger in Liberec Zoo

The Liberec Zoo was founded in 1904 and is the oldest one in the territory of the former Czechoslovakia. Today it has an area of almost 14 ha (35 acres) and keeps more than 160 species. The symbol of the zoo and the main attraction are the white tigers. However, since they are a breed of the mainland Asian tiger and not a separate species, it is planned to end their breeding after the death of the last individual.

The Botanical Garden Liberec was established in 1876 by the Verein der Naturfreunde ("Society of Friends of Nature") and is the oldest one in the Czech Republic. It was originally located on the site of the North Bohemian Museum, but was moved in 1895 due to the construction of the museum. In 1996–2000, it was completely rebuilt. Today it comprises nine glasshouses for visitors with a total area of 4,002 m^{2} (43,080 sq ft) and more than 8,000 exotic plants.

== Notable people ==
- Christoph Demantius (1567–1643), German composer and poet
- Joachim Johann Nepomuk Spalowsky (1752–1797), Austrian naturalist
- Josef Proksch (1794–1864), composer and teacher of Bedřich Smetana
- Friedrich Karl Ginzel (1850–1926), Austrian astronomer
- Heinrich Herkner (1863–1932), German economist
- Ferdinand Porsche (1875–1951), Austrian-Czech car designer
- Vlasta Burian (1891–1962), actor
- Edmund Nick (1891–1973), German composer
- Jaroslav Řídký (1897–1956), composer
- Konrad Henlein (1898–1945), German Nazi politician
- Arthur Beer (1900–1980), German astronomer
- Harald Kreutzberg (1902–1968), German dancer and choreographer
- Herbert Feigl (1902–1988), Austrian-American philosopher
- Guido Beck (1903–1989), Argentinian physicist
- Augustin Schramm (1907–1948), communist politician and officer
- Roderich Menzel (1907–1987), Czech-German tennis player
- Fritz Preissler (1908–1948), German luger
- Egon Hartmann (1919–2009), German architect
- Otfried Preußler (1923–2013), German writer
- Marketa Goetz-Stankiewicz (1927–2022), Canadian scholar and translator
- Roland Bulirsch (1932–2022), German mathematician
- Markus Lüpertz (born 1941), German artist
- Barbara Bouchet (born 1944), German-American actress and entrepreneur
- Jirina Marton (born 1946), Canadian artist and illustrator
- Oldřich Kaiser (born 1955), actor
- Vladimír Šlechta (born 1960), writer
- Jaroslav Nedvěd (born 1969), ice hockey player
- Petr Nedvěd (born 1971), ice hockey player
- Martin Damm (born 1972), tennis player
- Tomáš Enge (born 1976), racing driver
- Jan Víšek (born 1981), ice hockey player
- Yemi A.D. (born 1981), choreographer and artist
- Lukáš Derner (born 1983), ice hockey player
- Pavla Havlíková (born 1983), cyclist
- Zuzana Hejnová (born 1986), athlete, Olympic medalist
- Martin Cikl (born 1987), ski jumper
- Zuzana Maděrová (born 2003), snowboarder, Olympic winner

== Twin towns – sister cities ==
Liberec is twinned with:

- Amersfoort, Netherlands
- Augsburg, Germany
- Nahariya, Israel
- Zittau, Germany

== Gallery ==
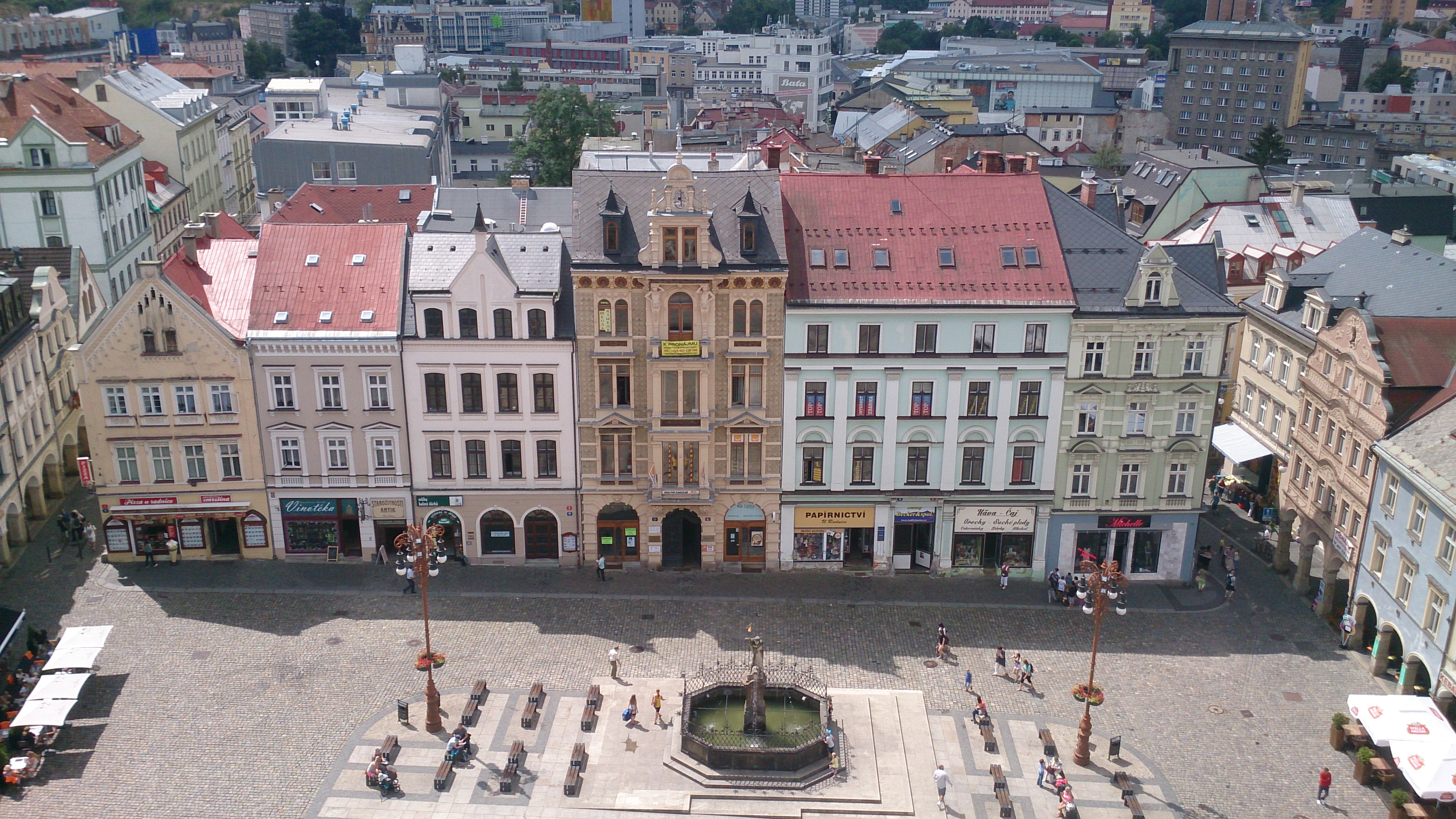
View from the city hall

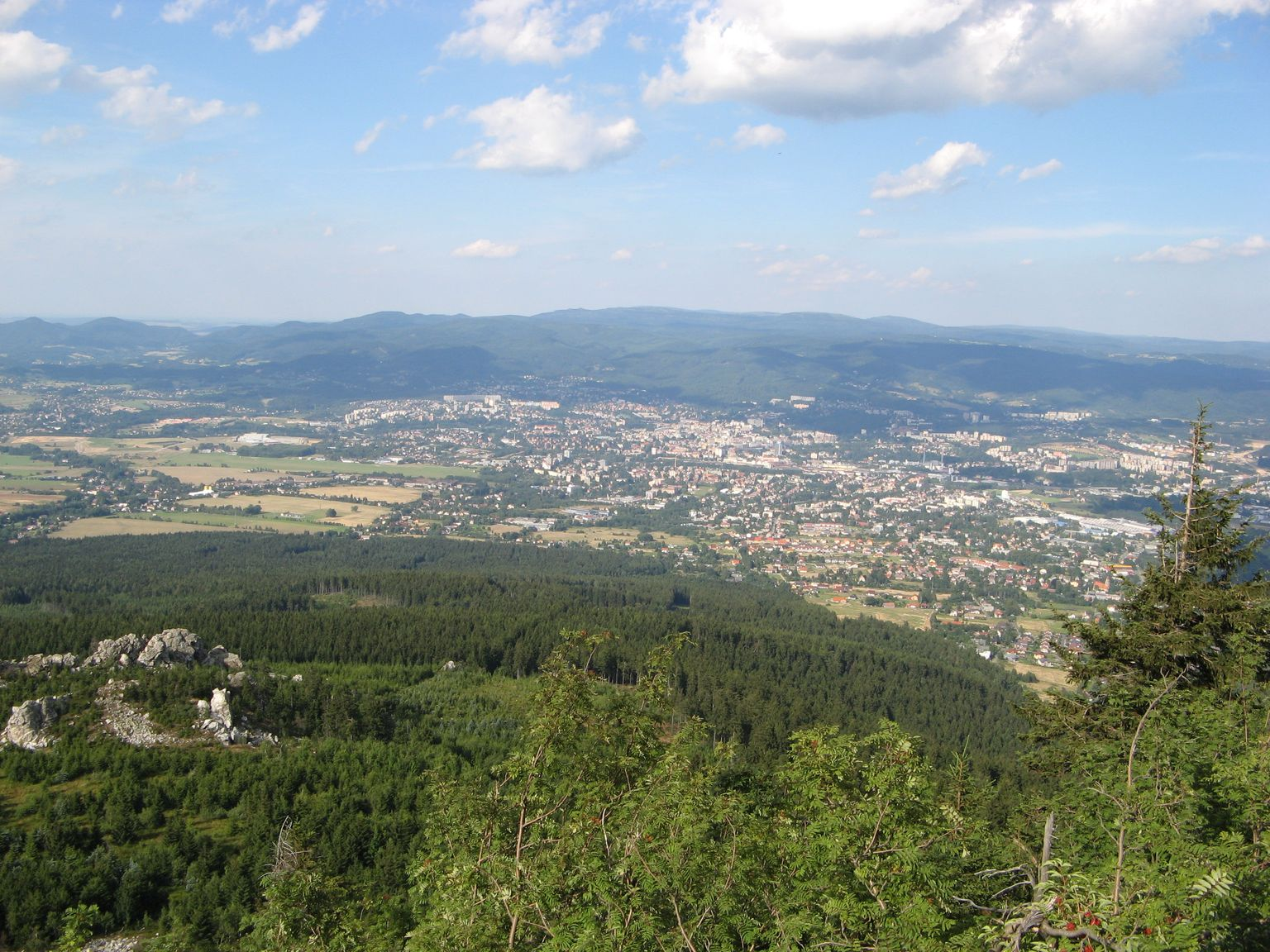
View of Liberec from Ještěd

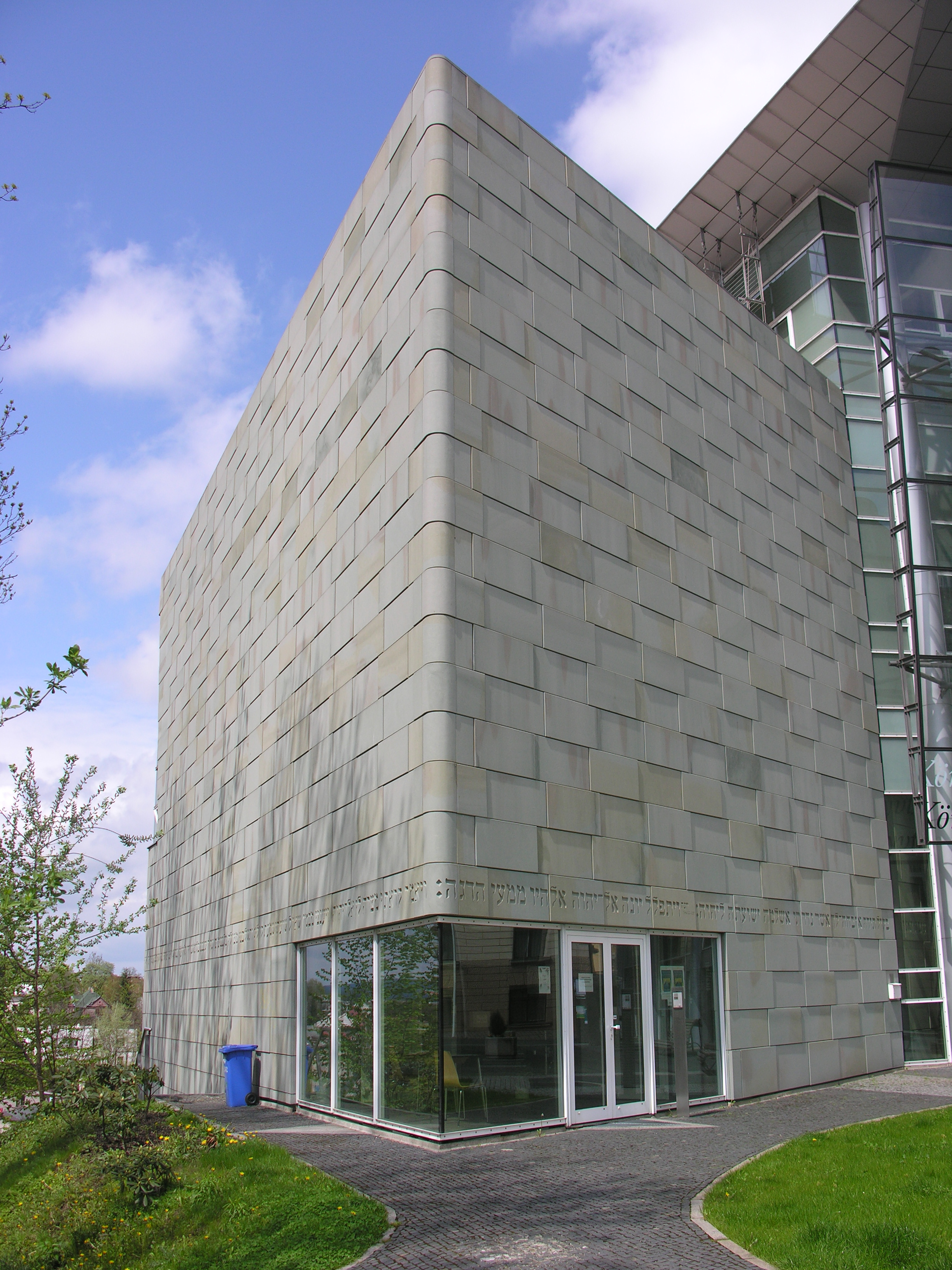
The Liberec New Synagogue
