= Víšek =

Víšek is a Czech surname. Notable people with the surname include:

- Jan Víšek (born 1981), Czech ice hockey player
- Tomáš Víšek (born 1957), Czech pianist
