= Jeřmanice =

- Municipality
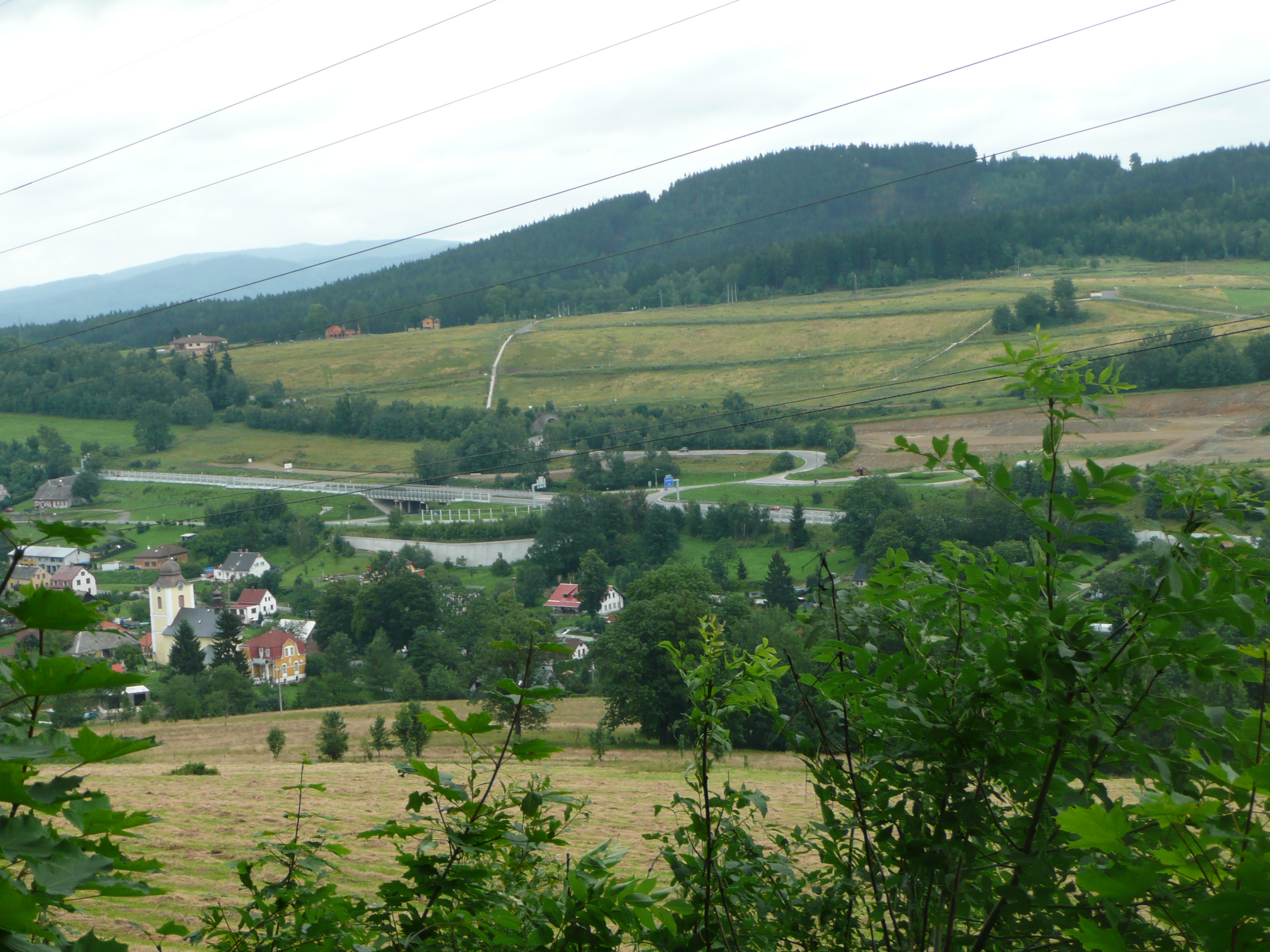
- View from the southwest

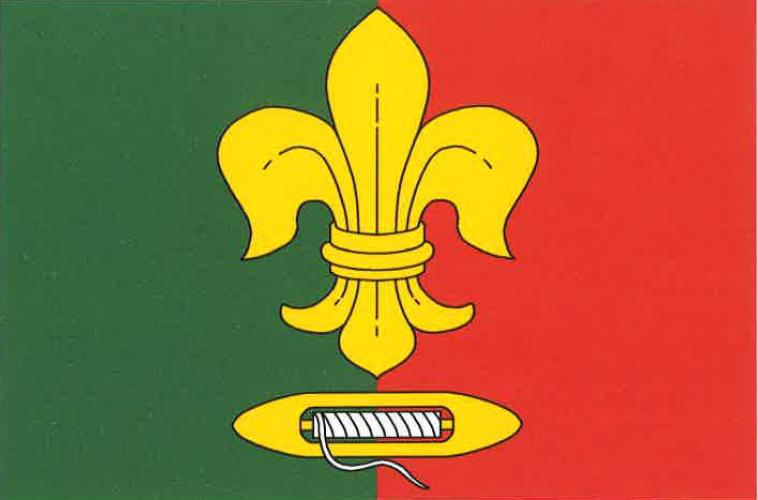
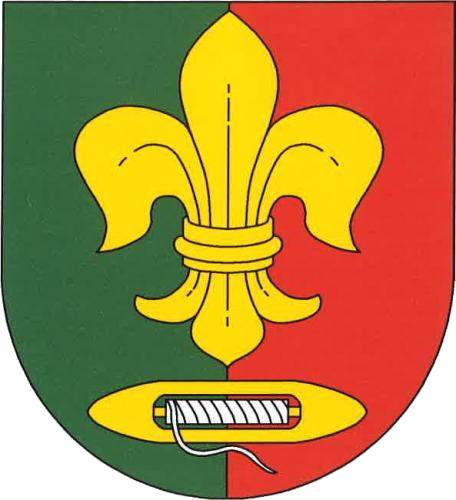
- Flag Coat of arms

- Location in the Czech Republic
- Coordinates: 50°41′59″N 15°5′38″E
- Country: Czech Republic
- Region: Liberec
- District: Liberec
- Founded: 1543

Area
  - Total: 4.38 km^{2} (1.69 sq mi)
- Elevation: 456 m (1,496 ft)

Population (2026-01-01)
  - Total: 686
  - Density: 157/km^{2} (406/sq mi)
- Time zone: UTC+1 (CET)
  - Summer (DST): UTC+2 (CEST)
- Postal code: 463 12
- Website: www.jermanice.cz

Jeřmanice (German: Hermannsthal) is a municipality and village in Liberec District in the Liberec Region of the Czech Republic. It has about 700 inhabitants.

== Etymology ==
The name is derived from the personal name Herman. It was the lokator of the village.

== Geography ==
Jeřmanice is located about 6 kilometres (4 mi) south of Liberec. The municipal territory lies on the border between three nature regions: the northwestern part lies in the Jizera Mountains, the southwestern part lies in the Ještěd–Kozákov Ridge, and the eastern part lies in the westernmost tip of the Giant Mountains Foothills. The highest point is located near the top of the Javorník mountain at 681 m (2,234 ft) above sea level.

== History ==
Jeřmanice was founded in 1543. In 1543–1544, 18 houses were built in the village.

From 1980 to 1985, Jeřmanice was a municipal part of Dlouhý Most. From 1986 to 1992, it was a part of Liberec under the name Liberec XXXVII-Jeřmanice. In 1993, it became a separate municipality again.

== Demographics ==
Historical population

Year	Pop.	±%
1869	1,603	—
1880	1,495	−6.7%
1890	1,303	−12.8%
1900	1,177	−9.7%
1910	1,062	−9.8%

Year	Pop.	±%
1921	865	−18.5%
1930	971	+12.3%
1950	497	−48.8%
1961	445	−10.5%
1970	394	−11.5%

Year	Pop.	±%
1980	358	−9.1%
1991	302	−15.6%
2001	308	+2.0%
2011	452	+46.8%
2021	575	+27.2%

Source: Censuses

== Transport ==
The R35 expressway (part of the European route E442) runs through the municipality.

Jeřmanice is located on the railway line Liberec–Jaroměř.

== Sights ==
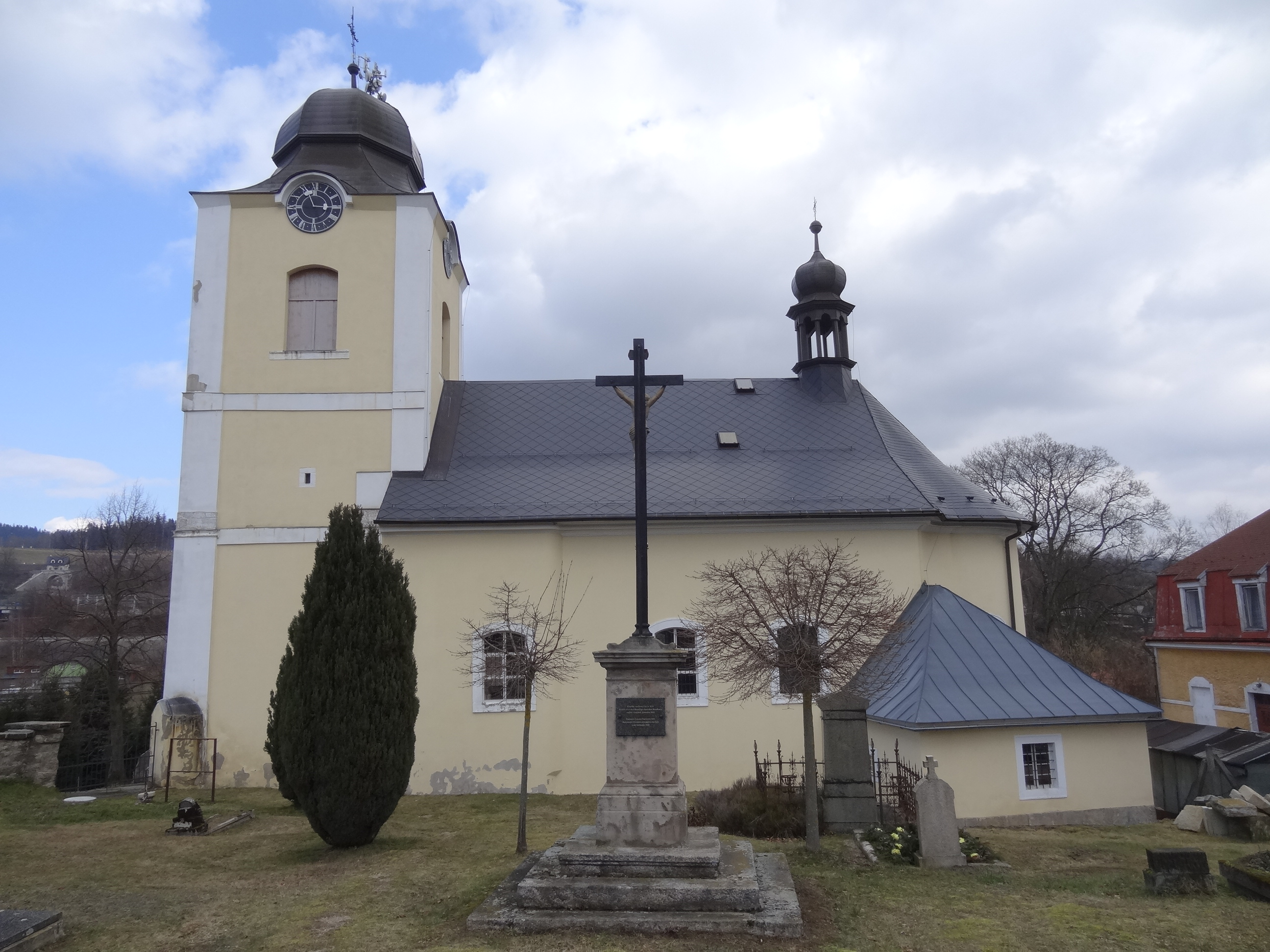
Church of Saint Anne

The main landmark of Jeřmanice is the Church of Saint Anne. It was built in the Baroque style in 1760–1764. In 1816, it was rebuilt to its present form.
