= Heinrich Lefler =

Austrian painter, graphic artist and stage designer

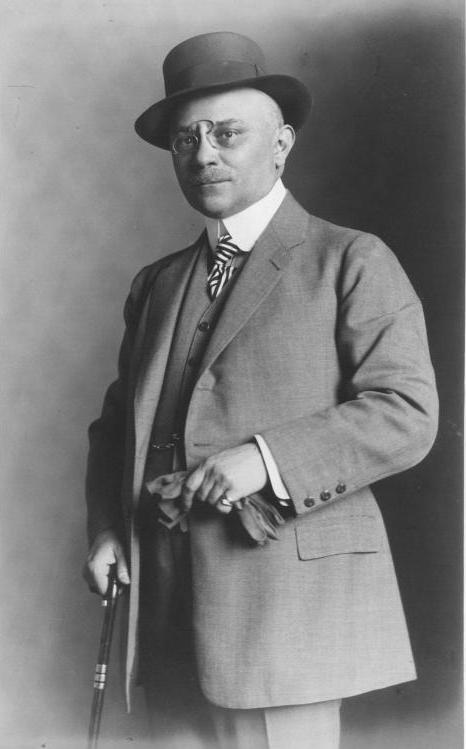
Heinrich Lefler, c.1900

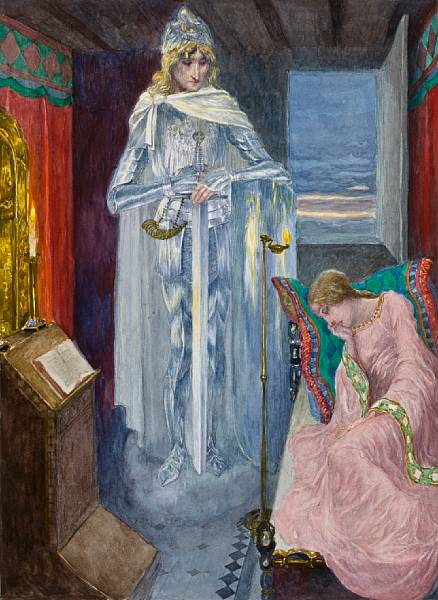
Scene from Act III of Lohengrin

Heinrich Lefler (7 November 1863 – 14 March 1919) was an Austrian painter, graphic artist and stage designer. His father was the painter Franz Lefler.

== Life and work ==
From 1880 to 1884, he studied at the Academy of Fine Arts Vienna under Christian Griepenkerl and, from 1884, at the Academy of Fine Arts Munich under Nikolaus Gysis and Wilhelm von Diez. In 1891, he became a member of the Society of Austrian Artists and, in 1900, was a founding member of the Hagenbund. From 1900 to 1903, he was an assistant to Anton Brioschi, the head designer at the Vienna State Opera, following which he became a professor at the academy until 1910. While at the Vienna Opera, he designed a set for the Metropolitan Opera and shipped the pieces to New York.

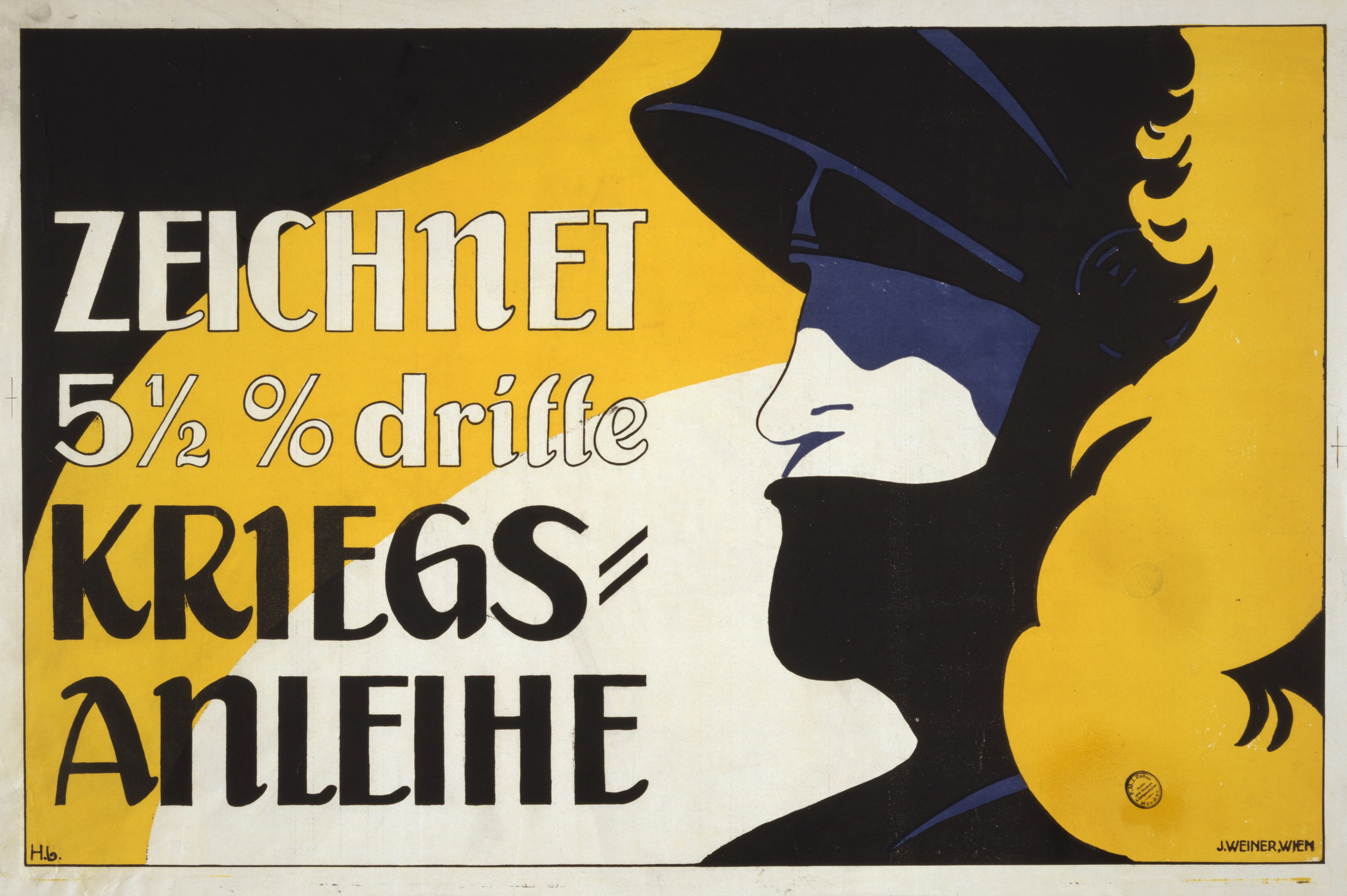
World War I war bond poster of Austria-Hungary, 1917

Outside his formal work, he spent extensive time in Weißenbach an der Triesting with his father and his brother-in-law, scenic designer Joseph Urban, painting murals for villas and hotels, designing invitation cards for summer festivals and, with librettist Camillo Walzel, staging theatrical productions for children.

The team of Lefler and Urban created many public events as well, including the 1905 Schiller Festival parade and a procession along the Ringstraße in 1908, on the occasion of the Emperor's 60th Jubilee. Lefler also designed banknotes, financial warrants and promotional posters for several companies, including Auerlicht and Krupp. Many of Lefler's costumes and stage designs have been preserved in the Max Reinhardt Collection at Harvard.

In 1903, he married opera singer Mina Wiesmüller, who modeled the portrait that appears in his design for the 1000 Kronen banknote.

In 1932, a street in Vienna, Donaustadt was renamed the "Heinrich-Lefler-Gasse" in his honor.
