= Franz Lefler =

Austrian painter (1831–1898)

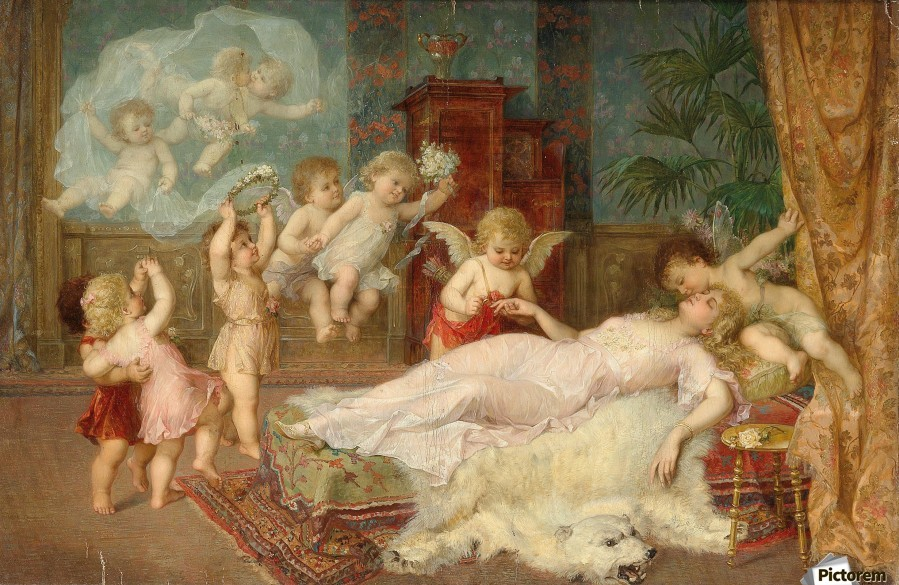
The Dream Wedding

Franz Lefler (1831, Langenbruck (now Dlouhý Most), Bohemia – 19 June 1898, Weissenbach an der Triesting) was an Austrian painter.

== Life ==
After his studies at the Academies of Fine Arts in Vienna and Prague, he settled in Vienna in 1858. He mainly painted allegories, portraits of children, genre and history paintings, ceiling and wall murals, and theater curtains. He spent his summers in Weißenbach an der Triesting with his friend Camillo Walzel, Director of the Theater an der Wien, where he painted murals and frescoes on the walls of the local hotels and villas. Many of his paintings show an attempt to combine the influences of Ancient Egyptian Art and Makartstil. He was especially interested in the subject of children in pictorial representation, and often painted socially critical themes.

His son Heinrich was also a painter, as well as a scenic designer and Professor at the Academy in Vienna.
