= Marketa Goetz-Stankiewicz =

Canadian professor (1927–2022)

Marketa Goetz-Stankiewicz (born Markéta Götzová; 15 February 1927 – 6 November 2022) was a Canadian scholar and translator, best-known for her work on Czech literature. Born to a German Bohemian mother and a Czech-Jewish father, she won the 1988 Ordo Scriptores Bohemici prize, 2000 Medal of Merit, and 2016 George Theiner Prize.

Radio Prague International described her as

"a crucial link for Czechoslovak dissidents with the West, smuggling forbidden books into Czechoslovakia and in turn smuggling dissident literature out of the country, helping to bring it into the Western consciousness."

== Life ==
Markéta Götzová was born in Liberec. From 1935 to 1948, she lived in Místek where she studied at a German School. Her father was Jewish and survived Theresienstadt.

In 1948, her family emigrated to Toronto. She studied German philology and graduated from University of Toronto, and Columbia University. She wrote her doctoral thesis on the 19th century German novelist Wilhelm Raabe. From 1959, she taught German literature at University of British Columbia, and was best known for her scholarship on samizdat and dissident writers such as Václav Havel.

In 1965, she married Polish-born political scientist Władysław Stankiewicz. From 1973 to 1989, she travelled annually to Prague, and met many Czech writers, promoting their work in the west. She retired in 1992 but continued writing and speaking at conferences.

She died at her home in Vancouver on 6 November 2022, aged 96.

== Works ==
- Markéta Goetz-Stankiewicz (ed) The Vanĕk Plays: Four Authors, One Character. Vancouver: University of British Columbia Press, 1987. ISBN 978-0774802673
- Good-Bye Samizdat: Twenty Years of Czechoslovak Underground Writing, Northwestern University Press, 1992. ISBN 978-0810110359
