= Augustin Schramm =

German-Czechoslovak communist and NKVD agent (1907–1948)

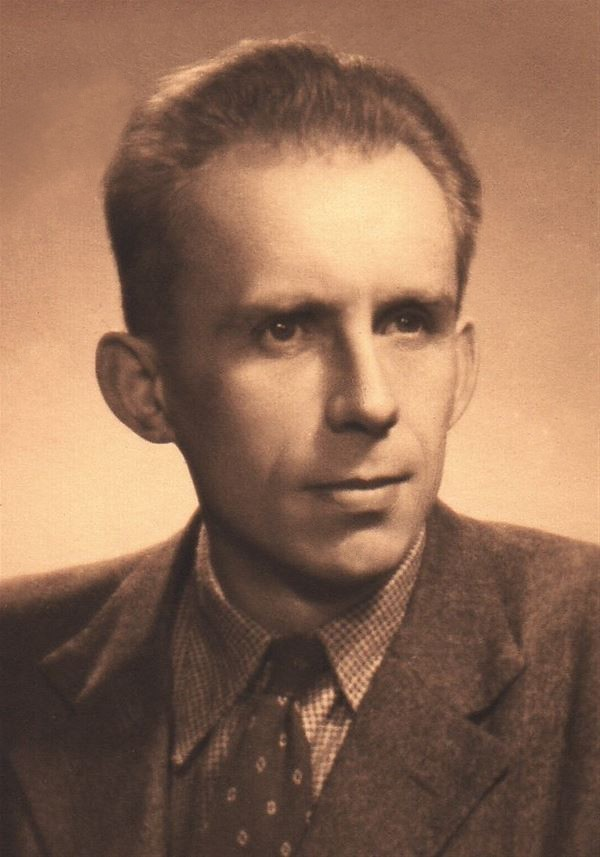
Augustin Schramm

Major Augustin Schramm (2 March 1907 in Liberec – 27 May 1948 in Prague) was an ethnic German Czechoslovak communist professional and NKVD agent. He was a member of the Central Committee of the Communist Party of Czechoslovakia (KSČ) in 1930s. During World War II Schramm was a political commissar (rank of major) at a training school for partisan parachuters in the Soviet Union, and after the war he was Head of the Partisans' Affair Department at KSČ HQ, and at Czechoslovak Ministry of Defence too, and co-ordinator of his own intelligence network.

Schramm was often suspected of playing the key role in the assassination of Jan Masaryk, democratic Foreign Minister, after the Communist takeover of Czechoslovakia on 25 February 1948. However, there is not enough evidence to support this claim. He was shot dead in his own flat two and half months later. The Communist political police and justice prosecuted, sentenced and executed Miloslav Choc, a young anticommunist. However, there are indications that Schramm was a man who knew too much, and his murder was a cover-up ordered by the NKVD and Communist parties' authorities. Late Major A. Schramm was celebrated as a "martyr of Communism" before the Velvet Revolution in 1989.
