= Vladimír Šlechta =

Czech science fiction and fantasy author

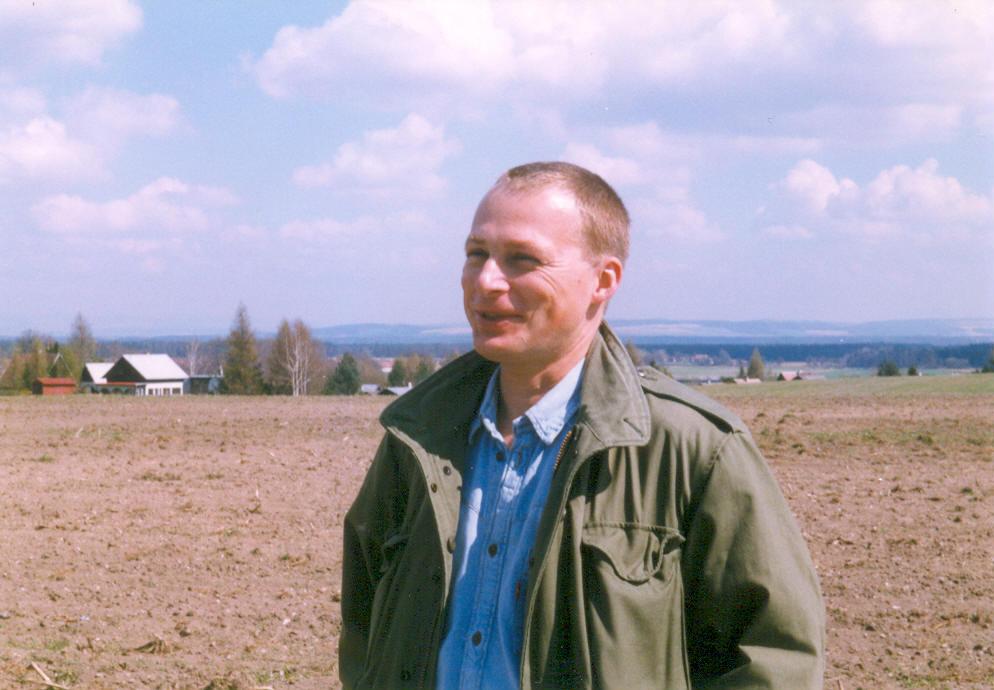
Vladimír Šlechta

Vladimír Šlechta is a Czech science fiction and fantasy author.

== Life ==
Šlechta was born in Liberec in 1960, but most of his life he spent in the South Bohemian Region, in České Budějovice or its surroundings. In 1967, his father joined the Communist Party of Czechoslovakia but one year later he opposed the party line, so his membership was terminated. He was also removed from his teaching post at a university, and he couldn't find another job.

Vladimír Šlechta couldn't study a secondary school in České Budějovice, that's why he studied in Trhové Sviny. He then went to study at the Czech Technical University in Prague's Faculty of Civil Engineering. After that, he was employed in design departments of various water management institutions. He worked three years as clerk for firemen, and a few years as a project and investment manager. Since 1999 he has been self-employed, designing water supply and sanitation.

Since 1984 has been married and he has two grown-up sons.

== Author ==
In 1993 Vladimír Šlechta published his first short story‚Legendary Weapon in the magazine Ikarie. In 1999, his two novels were published: Project Bersekr and Sharp Echoes. By 2007, about 15 thousand copies of his books were sold, making him one of the best-selling Czech authors of fantasy and sci-fi. Twice he received The Academy Prize for Science Fiction and Sci-fi in the Best Published Short Story category. At present, he is the author of nine books, in which he combines adventurous science-fiction and fantasy elements.

== Bibliography ==
The Bloody Borderland The Bloody Borderland is a cycle of fantasy stories which take place in the place called Borderland. In The Bloody Borderland the borders lead along territories of people, elves and hobgoblins. The borders are bloody because there are never-ceasing struggles for these borders (for its shifts, crossing the border, keeping). People fight with people, people fight with hobgoblins, people with elves, hobgoblins with hobgoblins and elves with hobgoblins. During which time individual fractions conclude temporary truce and alliances.

- Sign of a Circle (The Breath of Dragon, 1995), short story, adaptational version: part of the book Orcigard
- Triple Blood (Trojí krev) , short story, part of The Garden of the Sirens
- The Child's Dagger (Dětská dýka) , anthology: Dragon Beaters I (Drakobijci)
- The War Trick (Válečná lest) , anthology: Dragon Beaters II, short story
- Ex-orkista, short story
- The Common Law (Zvykové právo), anthology: Dragon Beaters III
- The Old War (Stará válka) , anthology: Dragon Beaters IV
- The Fly of the Star (Let hvězdy)
- The Winter Commission (Zimní zakázka) , anthology: Dragon Beaters V
- The Children of the Wood (Děti lesa)
- The Weapon of My Dead Friend (Zbraň mého mrtvého přítele) , anthology: Dragon Beaters VII
- A Piece of Luck (Šťastná náhoda) , anthology: The Legends of the Czech Fantasy
- The Easy Matter (Snadná záležitost) , anthology: Dragon Beaters VIII
- Blood of Angel (Krev anděla) , anthology: Imperium Bhemorum

=== Novels ===
- The Bloody Borderland (Krvavé pohraničí)
- The Wild Forest (Šílený les)
- Orcigard
- The Gordon's Earth 0: The Best Day (Gordonova země 0: Nejlepší den)
- The Gordon's Earth I: The Garden of the Sirens (Gordonova země 1: Zahrada siren)
- The Gordon's Earth II: The fences of Bones (Gordonova země 2: Ploty z kostí)

Next cycles – Havran

Havran is a cycle of four short stories which take place in the near future in Bohemia which are laying waste by ethnic war when the newcomers rebelled against the majority society.

- The God's copier (Boží kopírka)
- The Cathedral (Katedrála) , anthology 2001: Czech Odyssey (Česká odysea)
- The Journey through Orilien (Cesta přes Orilien) , anthology: 10 x Angel of the Last Judgment (10 x Anděl posledního soudu)
- Blood of the Angel (Krev anděla), anthology: Imperium Bohemorum

Next cycles – everything on Mars

This cycle of the short stories and fictions takes place in Europe after the second energetic war caused by lack of fossil fuel and the world backed to the Middle Ages after exhaustion of nearly all sources of energy. And Germanic Empire enforces its laws on these ruins of Atlantic civilization. Meanwhile, the colonization of Mars is proceeding and new sources of fossil fuel are discovered. Mankind has a chance to begin on Mars again.

=== The short stories ===
- The One Who goes Second (Ten, který jde první)
- The Legendary Weapon (Legendární zbraň)
- Dying according to Andrew F. (Umírání podle Andrewa F.)
- Artifact (Artefakt)
- Vision (Přízrak), anthology: Salamander (Mlok)
- The Invaders (Nájezdníci)
- The Spirit ship (Ducholoď)
- The Dome (Dóm)
- The Ritual (Rituál) , anthology: Rigor Mortis
- Conquista, anthology: Salamander
- Martian's God (Marťanský Bůh)

=== Fictions ===
- Project Bersekr
- The Sharp Echoes (Ostří ozvěny)
- Kyborg's Name (Kyborgovo jméno)

Everything that doesn't belong to cycles

- The Boys from Running Fire (Chlapci od běžícího ohně)
- The Bert's Klajm (Bertův Klajm)
- The Protected Journey (Chráněná cesta) , anthology: Salamander
- The Garden of the Ghosts (Zahrada duchů), The Breath of Dragon (Dech draka), The Fortress (Pevnost)
- The Story about the Black Death (Příběh o černé smrti), The Breath of Dragon
- Something about the Ghosts (Něco o strašidlech), The Weapons of Avalonu (Zbraně Avalonu)
- The operation Saint pike (Operace Svaté kopi)
- Marx's Constant (Marxova konstanta)
