= Liberec Zoo =

Zoo in Liberec, Czech Republic

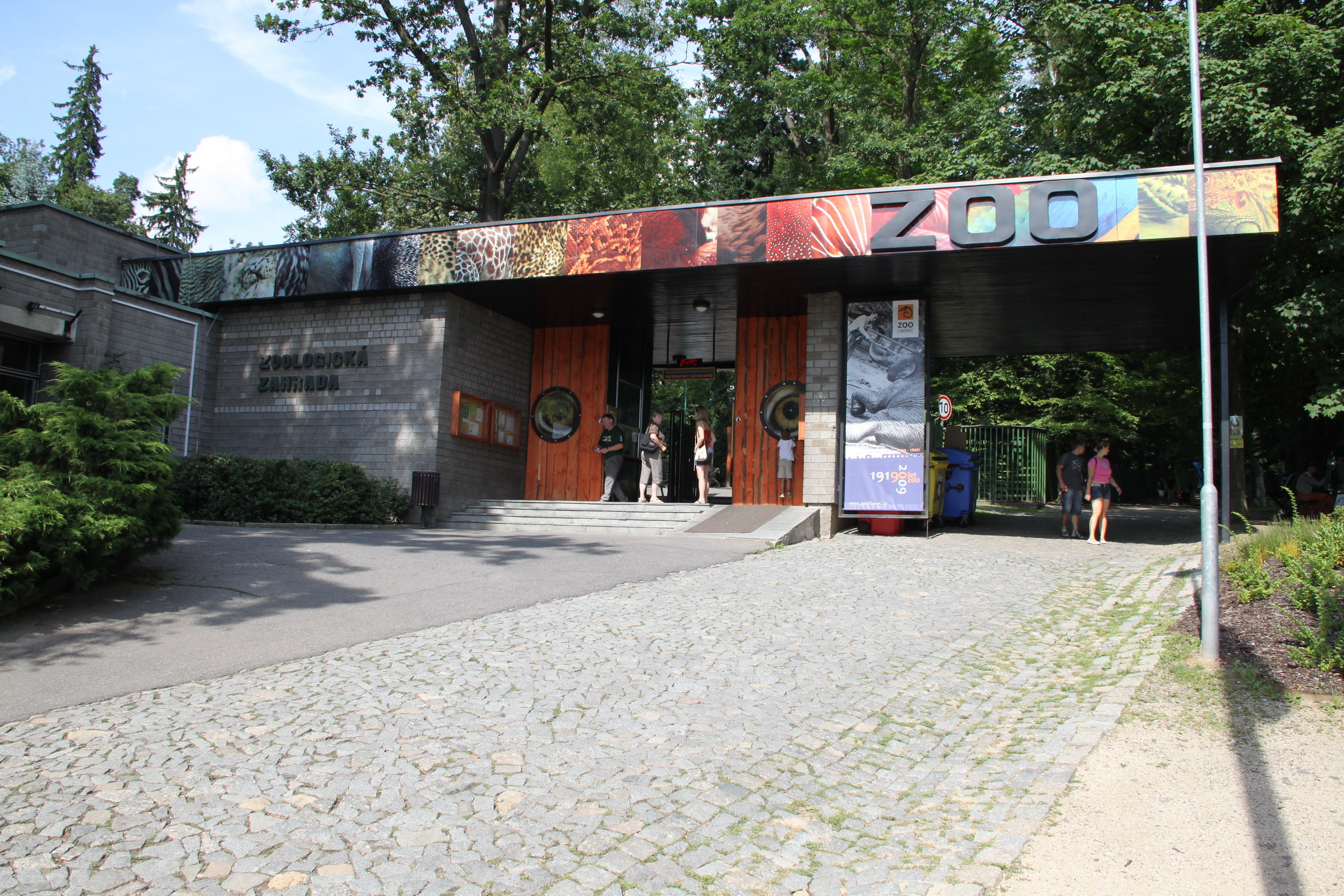
- The old entrance
- Interactive map of Liberec Zoo
- 50°46′36″N 15°04′33″E
- Date opened: 1904
- Location: Masarykova 1347/31, 460 01 Liberec 1
- Land area: 100 hectares
- No. of animals: 1 000
- No. of species: 170
- Memberships: EEP, EAZA
- Website: http://www.zooliberec.cz

Liberec Zoo (Zoologická zahrada Liberec) is a Czech zoo, located in Liberec in Czech Republic.

Liberec Zoo is the oldest zoo in the Czech Republic, founded in 1904 on the grounds of the winter quarters of a circus.

== Gallery ==
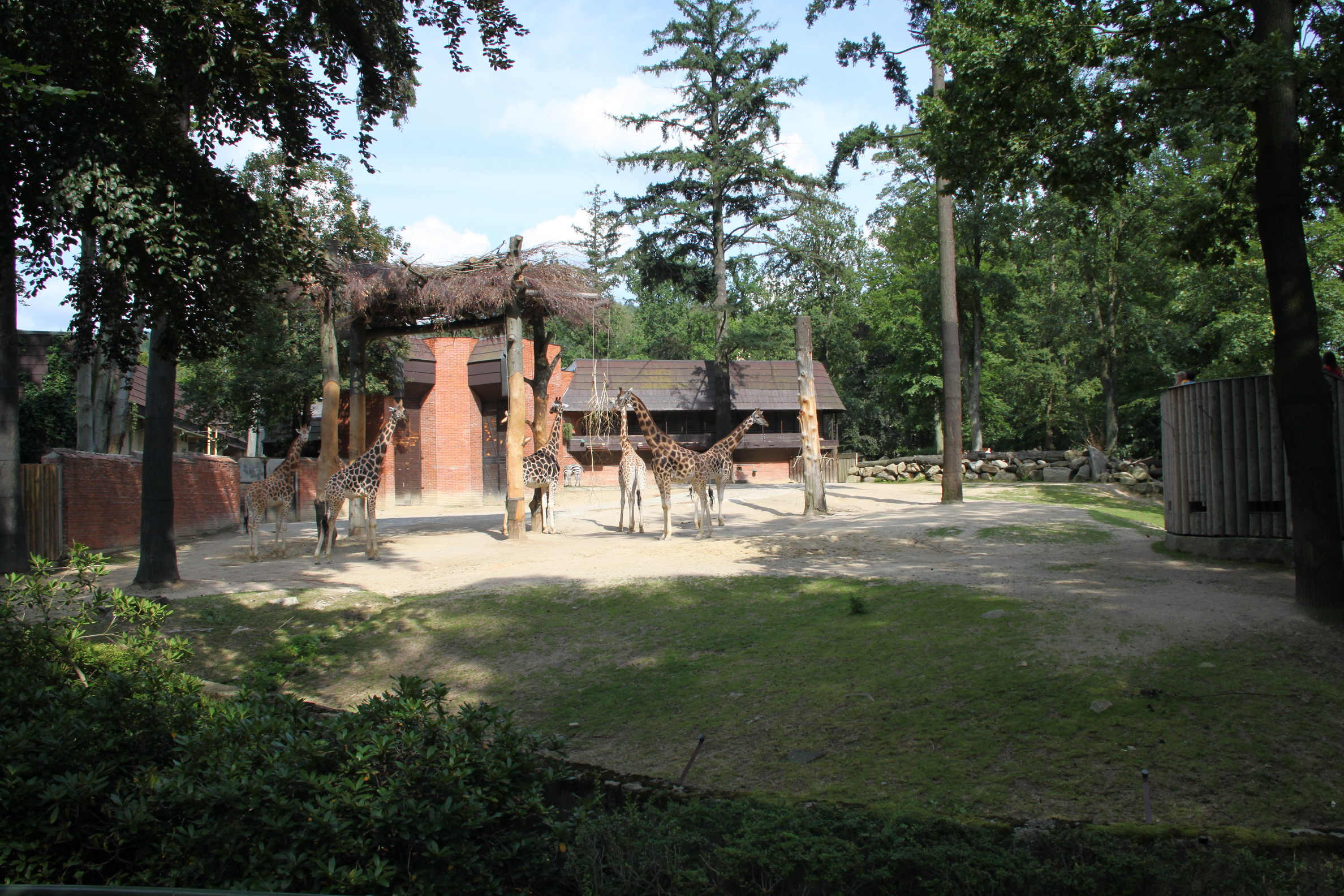
Giraffe Pavilion

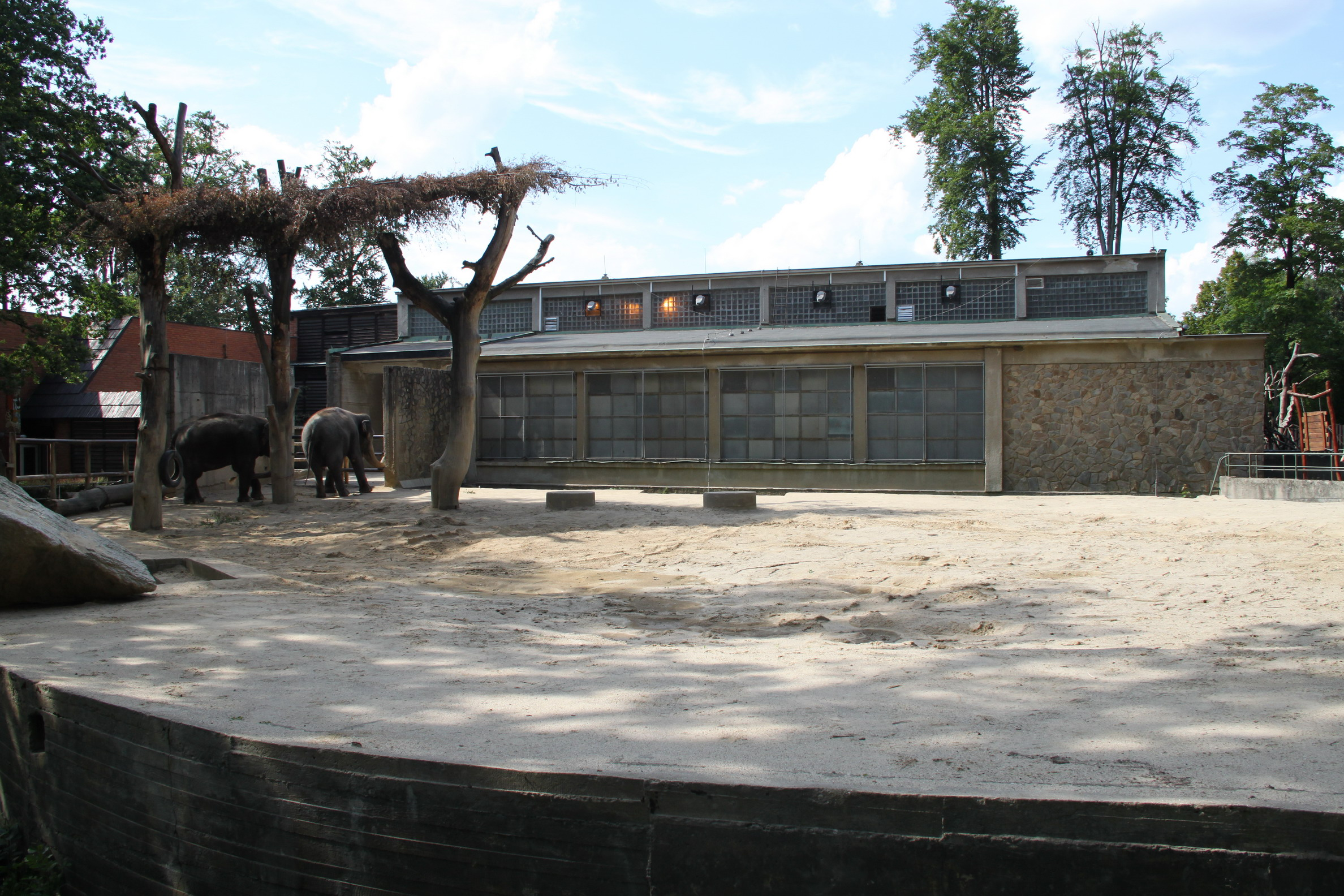
Elephant Pavilion

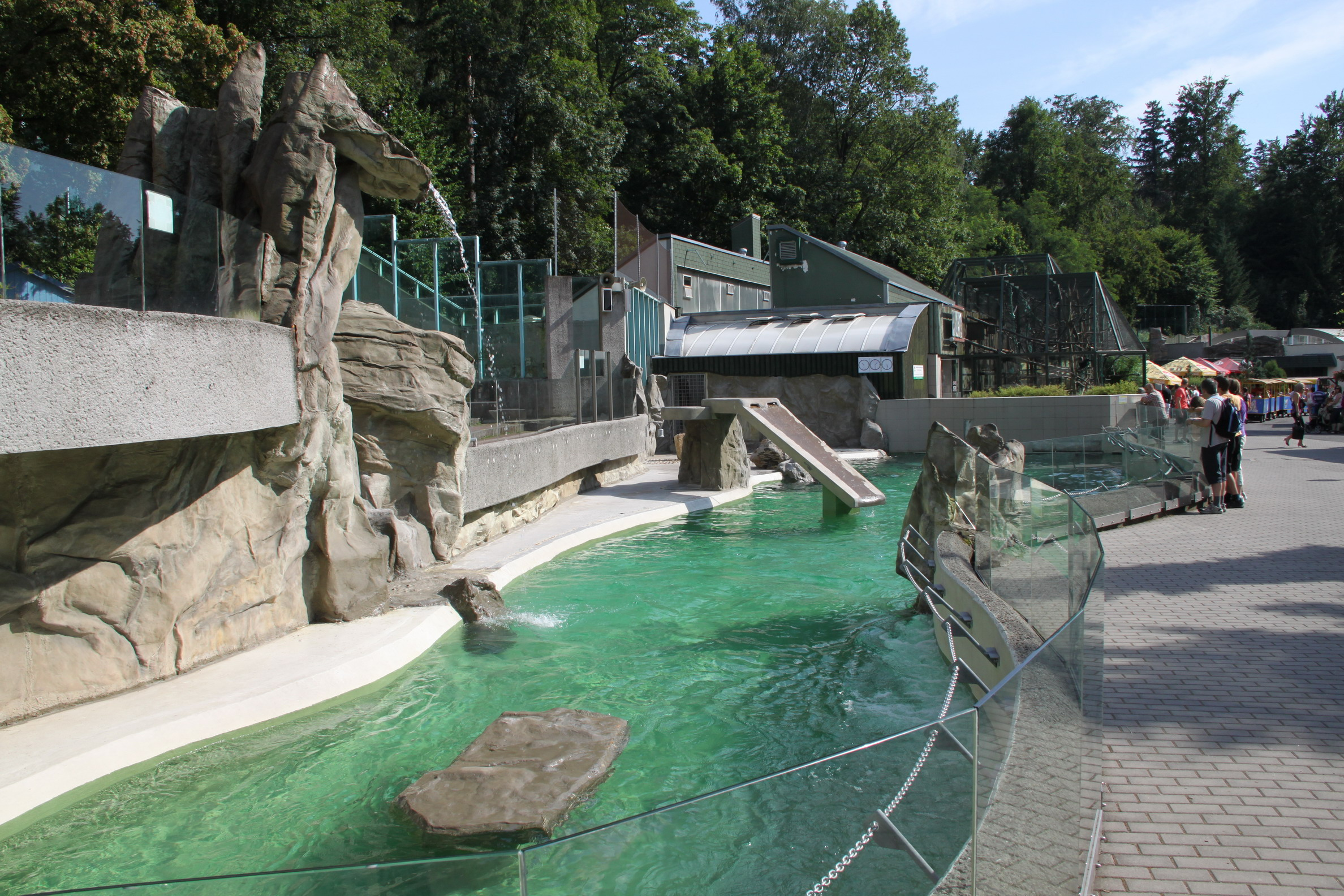
Sea Lion Pool
