= Jan Víšek =

Czech ice hockey player

- Born: June 12, 1981 (age 44) Liberec, Czechoslovakia
- Height: 6 ft 0 in (183 cm)
- Weight: 190 lb (86 kg; 13 st 8 lb)
- Position: Forward
- Shot: Right
- Played for: HC Bílí Tygři Liberec
- NHL draft: Undrafted
- Playing career: 2001–2018

Jan Víšek (born June 12, 1981) is a Czech former professional ice hockey player who played for HC Bílí Tygři Liberec in the Czech Extraliga.

Víšek also played for HC Berounští Medvědi, HC Benátky nad Jizerou and HC Jablonec nad Nisou.
