= Weissenbach an der Triesting =

- Municipality
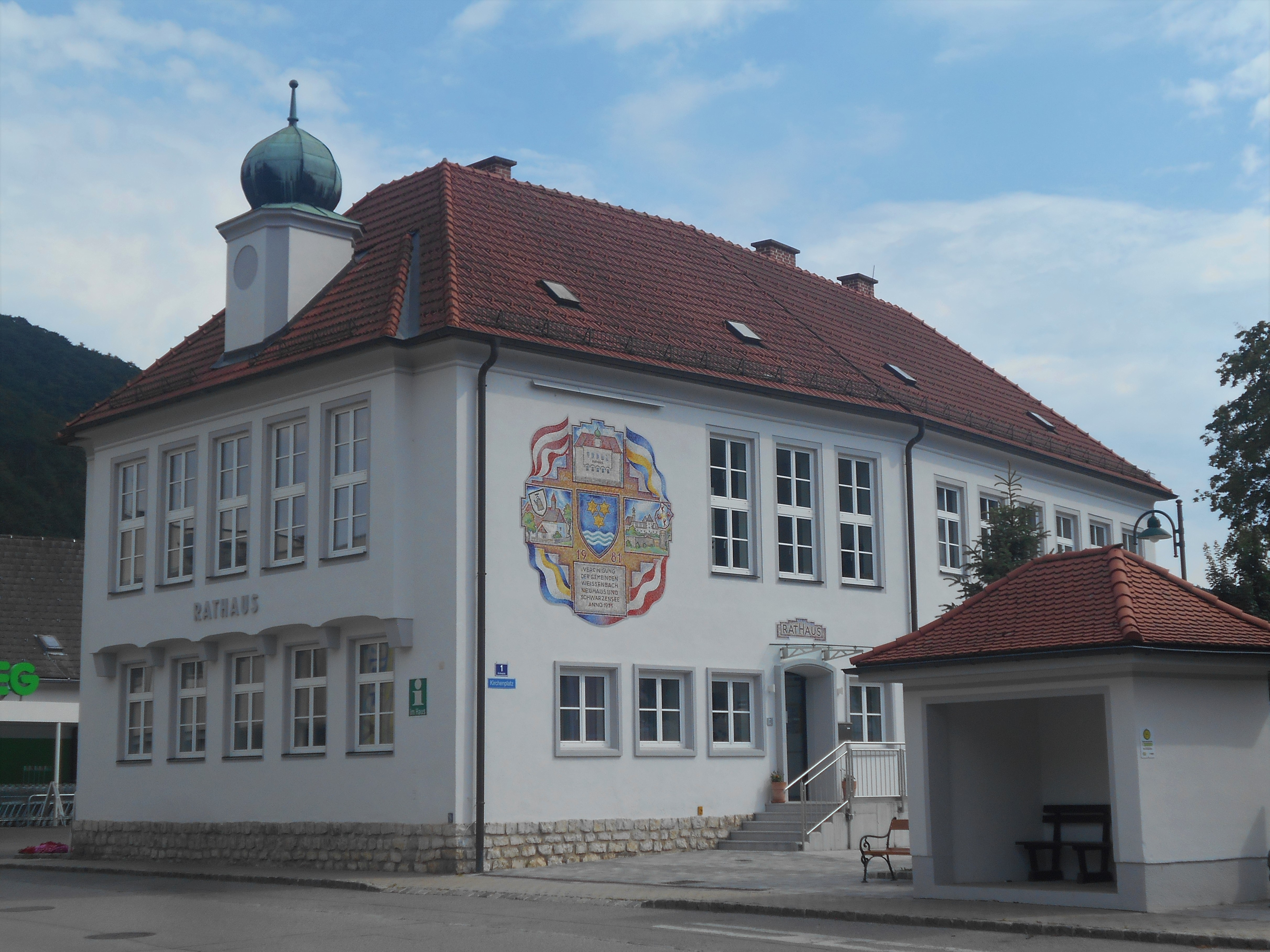
- The town hall

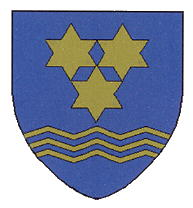
- Coat of arms

- Location within Austria
- Coordinates: 47°58′N 16°2′E
- Country: Austria
- State: Lower Austria
- District: Baden

Government
  - Mayor: Johann Miedl

Area
  - Total: 15.93 km^{2} (6.15 sq mi)
- Elevation: 652 m (2,139 ft)

Population (2018-01-01)
  - Total: 1,727
  - Density: 108.4/km^{2} (280.8/sq mi)
- Time zone: UTC+1 (CET)
  - Summer (DST): UTC+2 (CEST)
- Postal code: 2564, 2565
- Area code: 02674
- Website: www.weissenbach-triesting.at

Weissenbach an der Triesting is a town in the district of Baden in Lower Austria in Austria.

== Population ==
Historical population
Year	Pop.	±%
1971	1,664	—
1981	1,446	−13.1%
1991	1,904	+31.7%
2001	1,650	−13.3%
2011	1,739	+5.4%
