= Dlouhý Most =

- Municipality
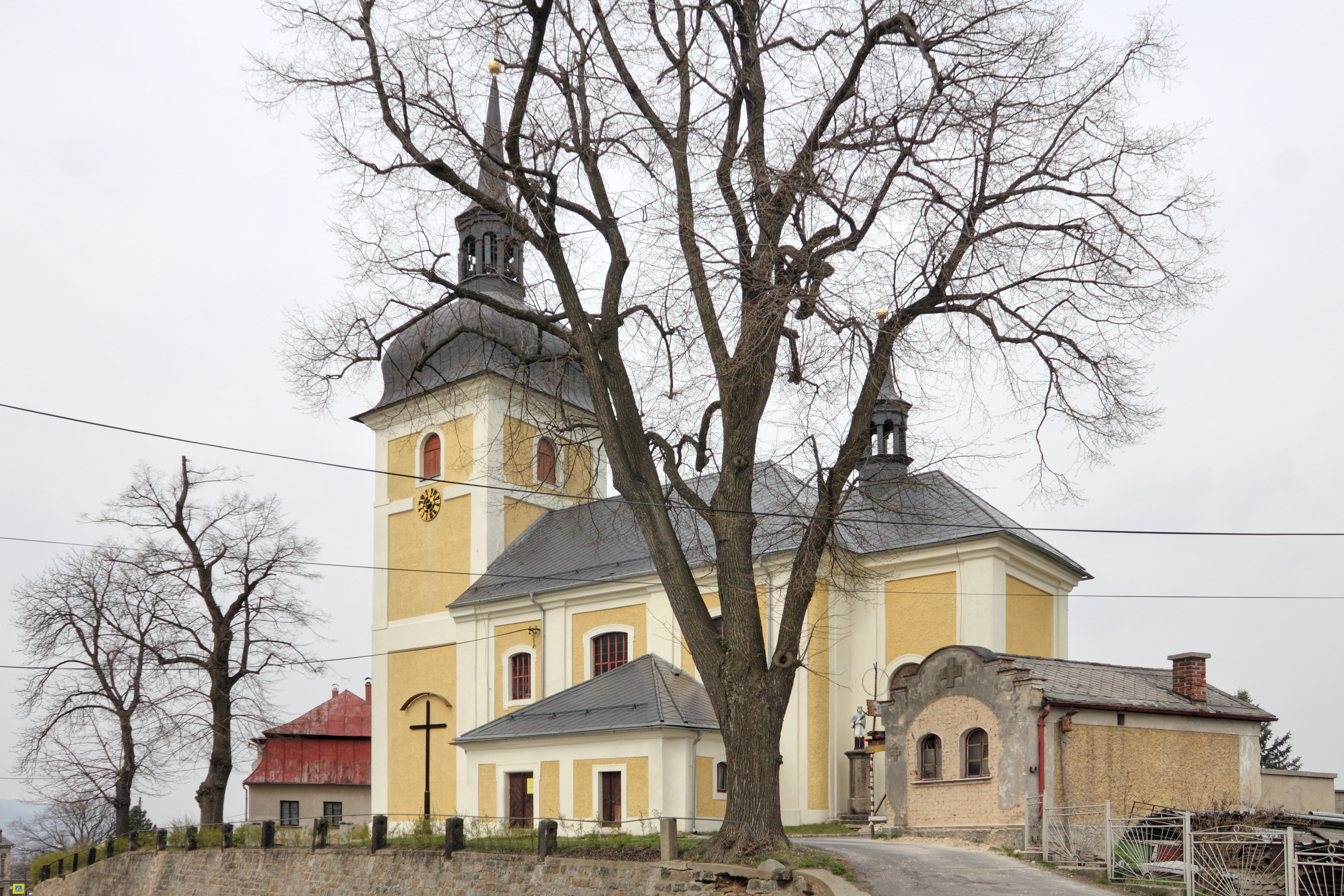
- Church of Saint Lawrence

- Flag Coat of arms

- Location in the Czech Republic
- Coordinates: 50°42′42″N 15°4′34″E
- Country: Czech Republic
- Region: Liberec
- District: Liberec
- First mentioned: 1237

Area
  - Total: 4.44 km^{2} (1.71 sq mi)
- Elevation: 495 m (1,624 ft)

Population (2026-01-01)
  - Total: 990
  - Density: 220/km^{2} (580/sq mi)
- Time zone: UTC+1 (CET)
  - Summer (DST): UTC+2 (CEST)
- Postal code: 463 12
- Website: www.dlouhy-most.cz

Dlouhý Most (German: Langenbruck) is a municipality and village in Liberec District in the Liberec Region of the Czech Republic. It has about 1,000 inhabitants.

== History ==
The first written mention of Dlouhý Most is from 1237.

== Demographics ==
Historical population
Year	Pop.	±%
1869	2,154	—
1880	2,099	−2.6%
1890	1,896	−9.7%
1900	1,631	−14.0%
1910	1,575	−3.4%
1921	1,276	−19.0%
1930	1,361	+6.7%
1950	785	−42.3%
1961	751	−4.3%
1970	692	−7.9%
1980	611	−11.7%
1991	503	−17.7%
2001	561	+11.5%
2011	784	+39.8%
2021	947	+20.8%
Source: Censuses

== Notable people ==
- Franz Lefler (1831–1898), Austrian painter
- Bruno Hübner (1899–1983), Austrian actor
