= Sobětuchy (Tuřice) =

- Village
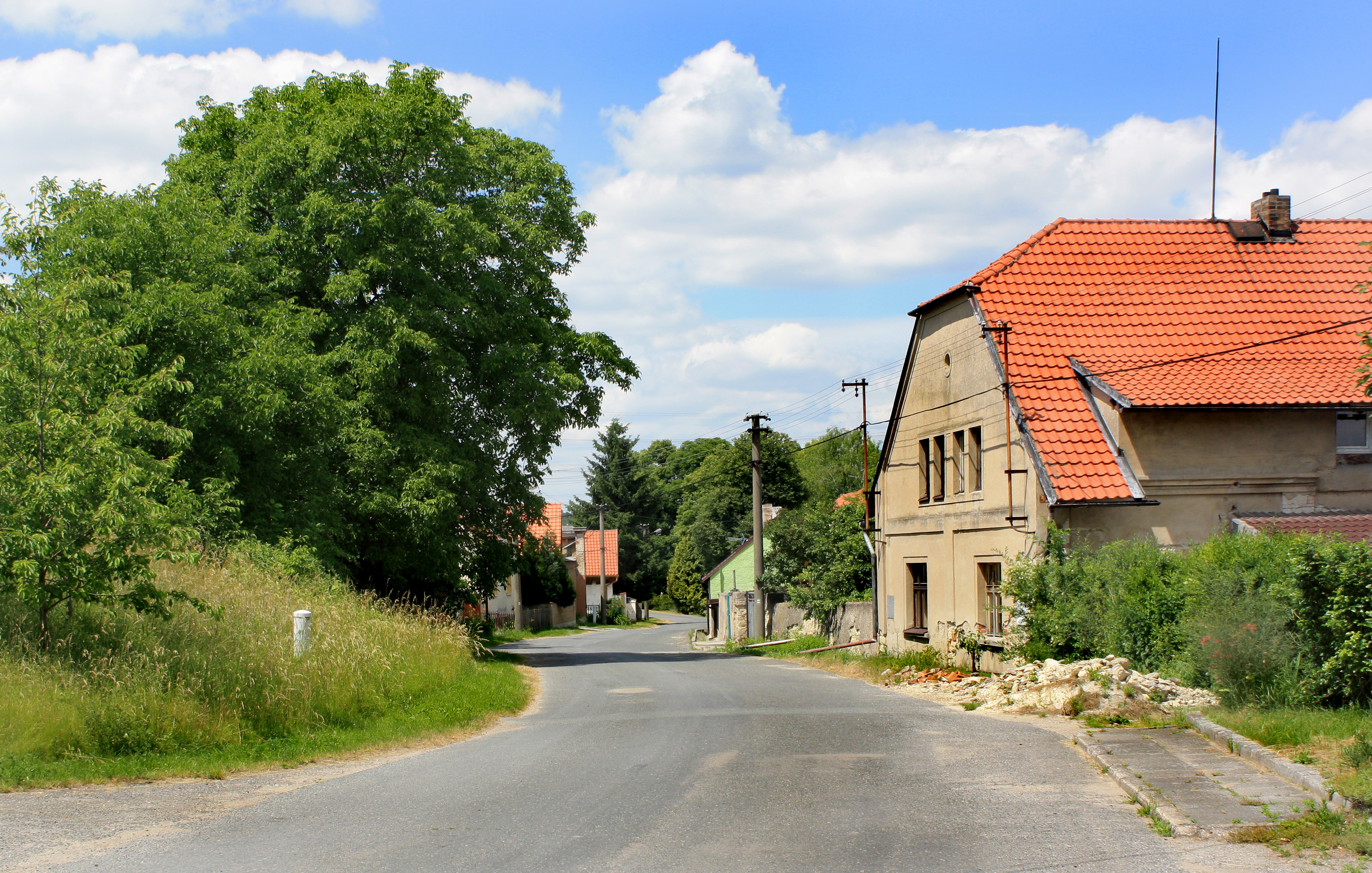
- Southern part of Sobětuchy

- Location in the Czech Republic
- Coordinates: 50°15′19″N 14°45′48″E
- Country: Czech Republic
- Region: Central Bohemian
- District: Mladá Boleslav
- Municipality: Tuřice
- First mentioned: 1488

Area
  - Total: 1.91 km^{2} (0.74 sq mi)
- Elevation: 199 m (653 ft)

Population (2021)
  - Total: 76
  - Density: 40/km^{2} (100/sq mi)
- Time zone: UTC+1 (CET)
  - Summer (DST): UTC+2 (CEST)
- Postal code: 294 74

Sobětuchy is a village and municipal part of Tuřice in Mladá Boleslav District in the Central Bohemian Region of the Czech Republic. It has about 80 inhabitants.

== Geography ==
Sobětuchy lies on the right bank of the Jizera River.

== Demographics ==
Historical population
Year	Pop.	±%
1869	116	—
1880	129	+11.2%
1890	117	−9.3%
1900	106	−9.4%
1910	106	+0.0%
1921	110	+3.8%
1930	114	+3.6%
1950	81	−28.9%
1961	87	+7.4%
1970	76	−12.6%
1980	54	−28.9%
1991	60	+11.1%
2001	62	+3.3%
2011	67	+8.1%
2021	76	+13.4%
Source: Censuses

== Transport ==
The D10 motorway runs just next to the territory of Sobětuchy.
