= Lázně Toušeň =

- Market town
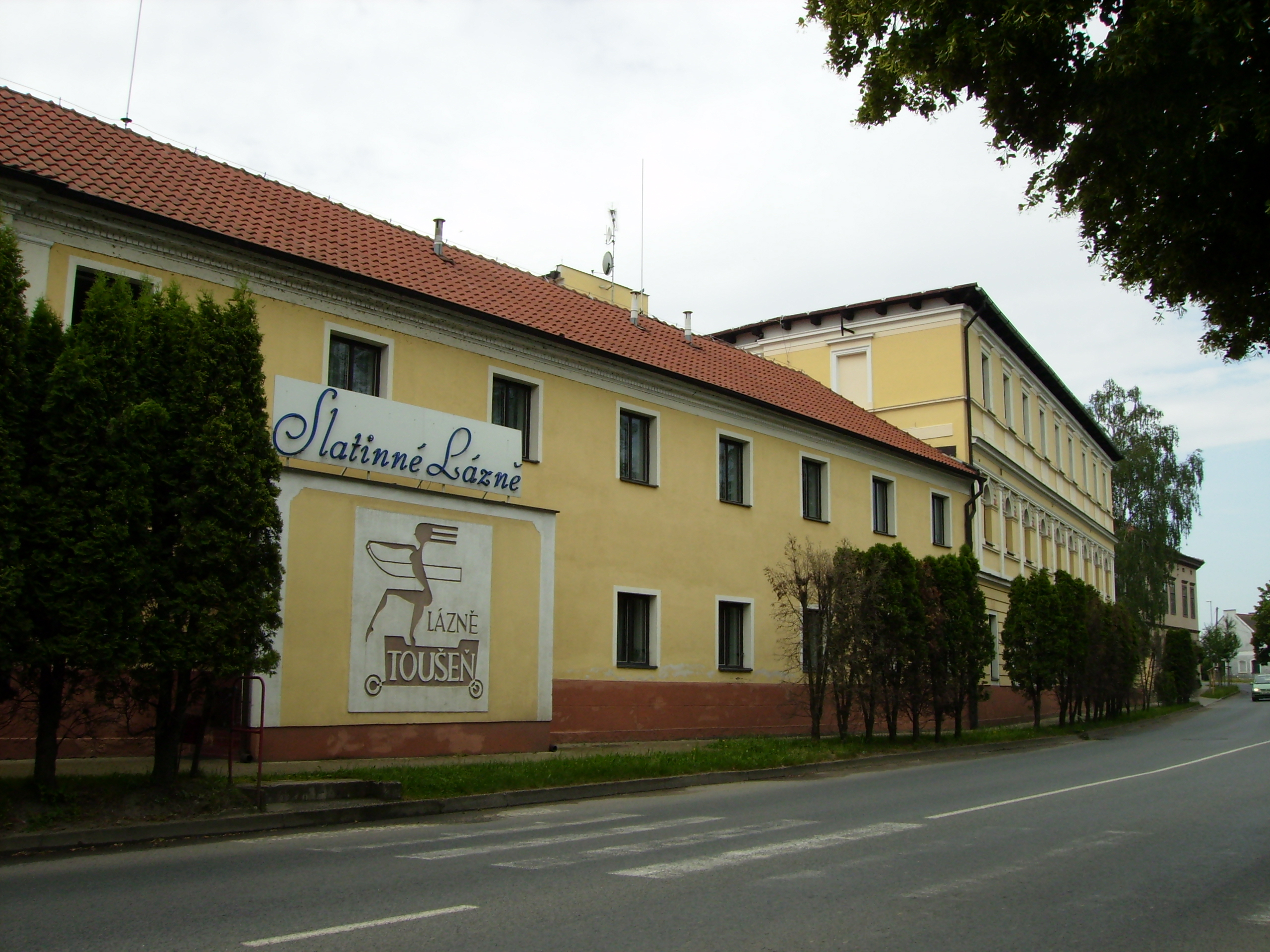
- Spa building

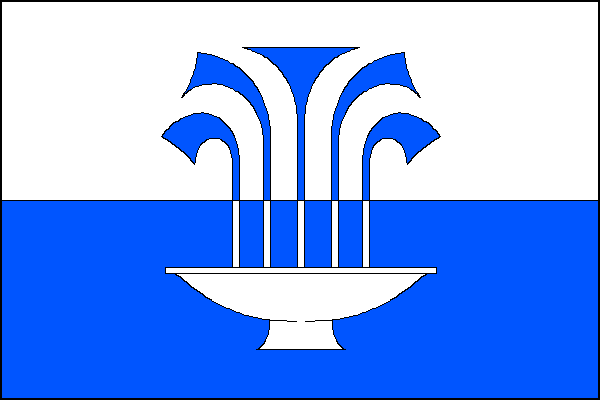
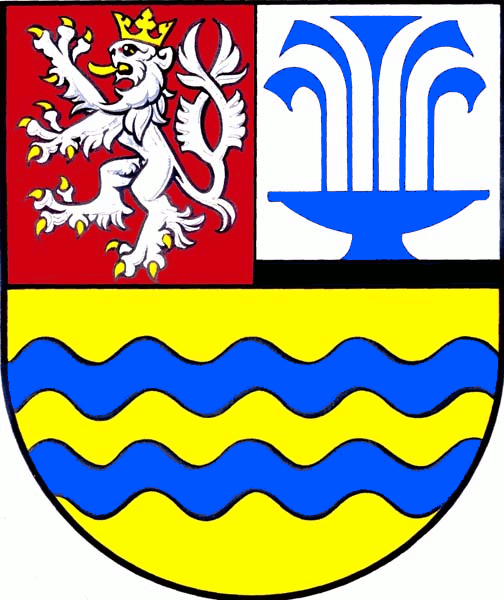
- Flag Coat of arms

- Location in the Czech Republic
- Coordinates: 50°10′10″N 14°42′58″E
- Country: Czech Republic
- Region: Central Bohemian
- District: Prague-East
- First mentioned: 1293

Area
  - Total: 5.55 km^{2} (2.14 sq mi)
- Elevation: 177 m (581 ft)

Population (2026-01-01)
  - Total: 1,500
  - Density: 270/km^{2} (700/sq mi)
- Time zone: UTC+1 (CET)
  - Summer (DST): UTC+2 (CEST)
- Postal code: 250 89
- Website: www.laznetousen.cz

Lázně Toušeň (Czech pronunciation: [ˈlaːzɲɛ ˈtouʃɛɲ]; formerly Toušeň; German: Tauschim) is a spa market town in Prague-East District in the Central Bohemian Region of the Czech Republic. It has about 1,500 inhabitants.

== Etymology ==
The name Toušeň is derived from the personal name Tušen/Toušen, meaning "Tušen's/Toušen's (court)". The modern name Lázně Toušeň means 'spa Toušeň'.

== Geography ==
Lázně Toušeň is located about 14 kilometres (9 mi) northeast of Prague. It lies in a flat agricultural landscape in the Central Elbe Table within the Polabí lowland. The market town is situated on the left bank of the Elbe River, opposite the confluence of the Elbe and Jizera rivers. In the western part of the municipal territory are two artificial lakes created by flooding sandstone quarries: Mezi mosty and Malvíny.

== History ==
The first written mention of Toušeň is from 1293. In the 17th century, it was owned by the Waldstein family. In 1777, part of the market town's land was separated and the new village of Káraný was founded on it. The iron spring has been known since time immemorial and in 1868, a small spa was founded. After World War II, the spa focused on the treatment of top athletes.

== Demographics ==
Historical population

| Year | Pop. | ±% |
|---|---|---|
| 1869 | 788 | — |
| 1880 | 872 | +10.7% |
| 1890 | 889 | +1.9% |
| 1900 | 868 | −2.4% |
| 1910 | 1,032 | +18.9% |

| Year | Pop. | ±% |
|---|---|---|
| 1921 | 1,181 | +14.4% |
| 1930 | 1,323 | +12.0% |
| 1950 | 1,343 | +1.5% |
| 1961 | 1,325 | −1.3% |
| 1970 | 1,226 | −7.5% |

| Year | Pop. | ±% |
|---|---|---|
| 1980 | 1,094 | −10.8% |
| 1991 | 978 | −10.6% |
| 2001 | 1,004 | +2.7% |
| 2011 | 1,339 | +33.4% |
| 2021 | 1,460 | +9.0% |

Source: Censuses

== Economy ==
Lázně Toušeň is known for its mud baths. The original spa was expanded with mud baths in 1899. the spa focuses on the treatment of musculoskeletal, skin, nervous system and gynecological diseases. Peloid is used for the mud baths.

== Transport ==
Lázně Toušeň is located on the railway line Neratovice–Čelákovice.

== Sights ==
The main landmark of Lázně Toušeň is the Church of Saint Florian. It was built in the neo-Gothic style in 1888–1889.
