= Sojovice =

- Municipality
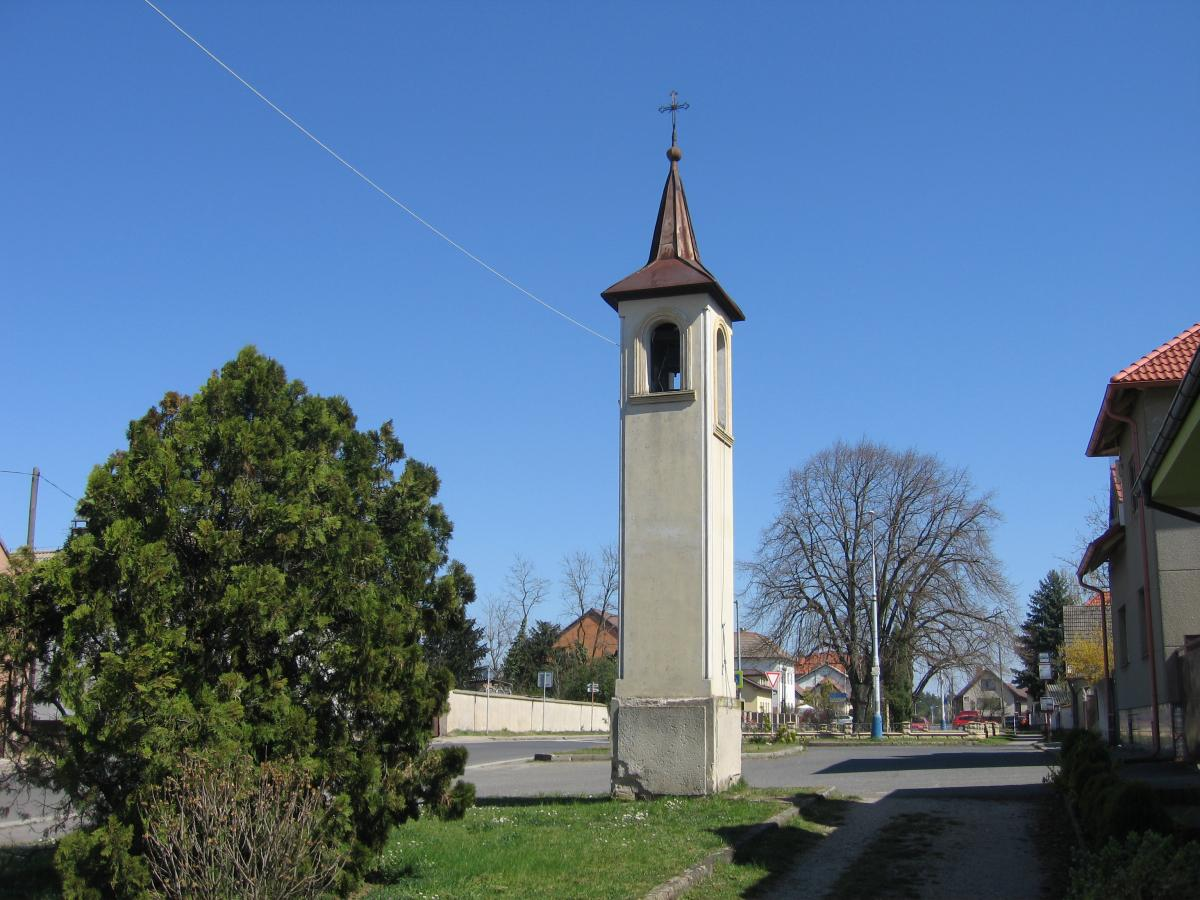
- Belfry in the centre of Sojovice

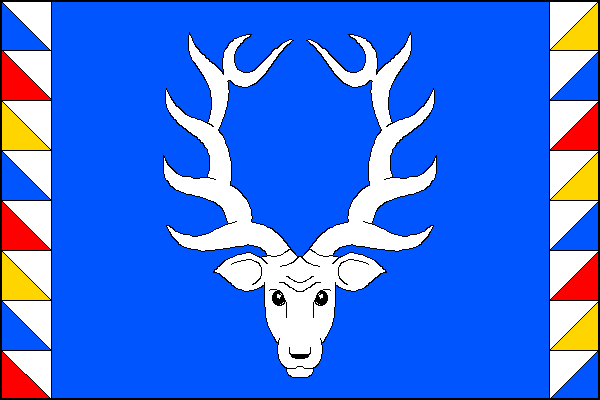
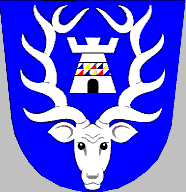
- Flag Coat of arms

- Location in the Czech Republic
- Coordinates: 50°13′20″N 14°45′43″E
- Country: Czech Republic
- Region: Central Bohemian
- District: Mladá Boleslav
- First mentioned: 1360

Area
  - Total: 7.55 km^{2} (2.92 sq mi)
- Elevation: 180 m (590 ft)

Population (2026-01-01)
  - Total: 606
  - Density: 80.3/km^{2} (208/sq mi)
- Time zone: UTC+1 (CET)
  - Summer (DST): UTC+2 (CEST)
- Postal code: 294 75
- Website: www.sojovice.cz

Sojovice is a municipality and village in Mladá Boleslav District in the Central Bohemian Region of the Czech Republic. It has about 600 inhabitants.

== Etymology ==
The initial name of the village was Sovojovice. It was derived from the personal name Sovoja, meaning "the village of Sovoja's people". The name was then distorted into its current form.

== Geography ==
Sojovice is located about 24 kilometres (15 mi) southwest of Mladá Boleslav and 21 km (13 mi) northeast of Prague. It lies in a flat landscape in the Central Elbe Table. The municipality is situated on the left bank of the Jizera River.

== History ==
The first written mention of Sojovice is from 1360. From 1986 to 1999, it was merged with Skorkov. Since 2000, it has been a separate municipality.

== Demographics ==
Historical population

Year	Pop.	±%
1869	359	—
1880	426	+18.7%
1890	403	−5.4%
1900	399	−1.0%
1910	524	+31.3%

Year	Pop.	±%
1921	532	+1.5%
1930	560	+5.3%
1950	505	−9.8%
1961	495	−2.0%
1970	444	−10.3%

Year	Pop.	±%
1980	384	−13.5%
1991	382	−0.5%
2001	417	+9.2%
2011	537	+28.8%
2021	572	+6.5%

Source: Censuses

== Transport ==
The railway line Ústí nad Labem–Lysá nad Labem runs through the southern part of the municipality, but there is no train station.

== Sights ==
There are no protected cultural monuments in the municipality.
