= Benátky nad Jizerou =

- Town
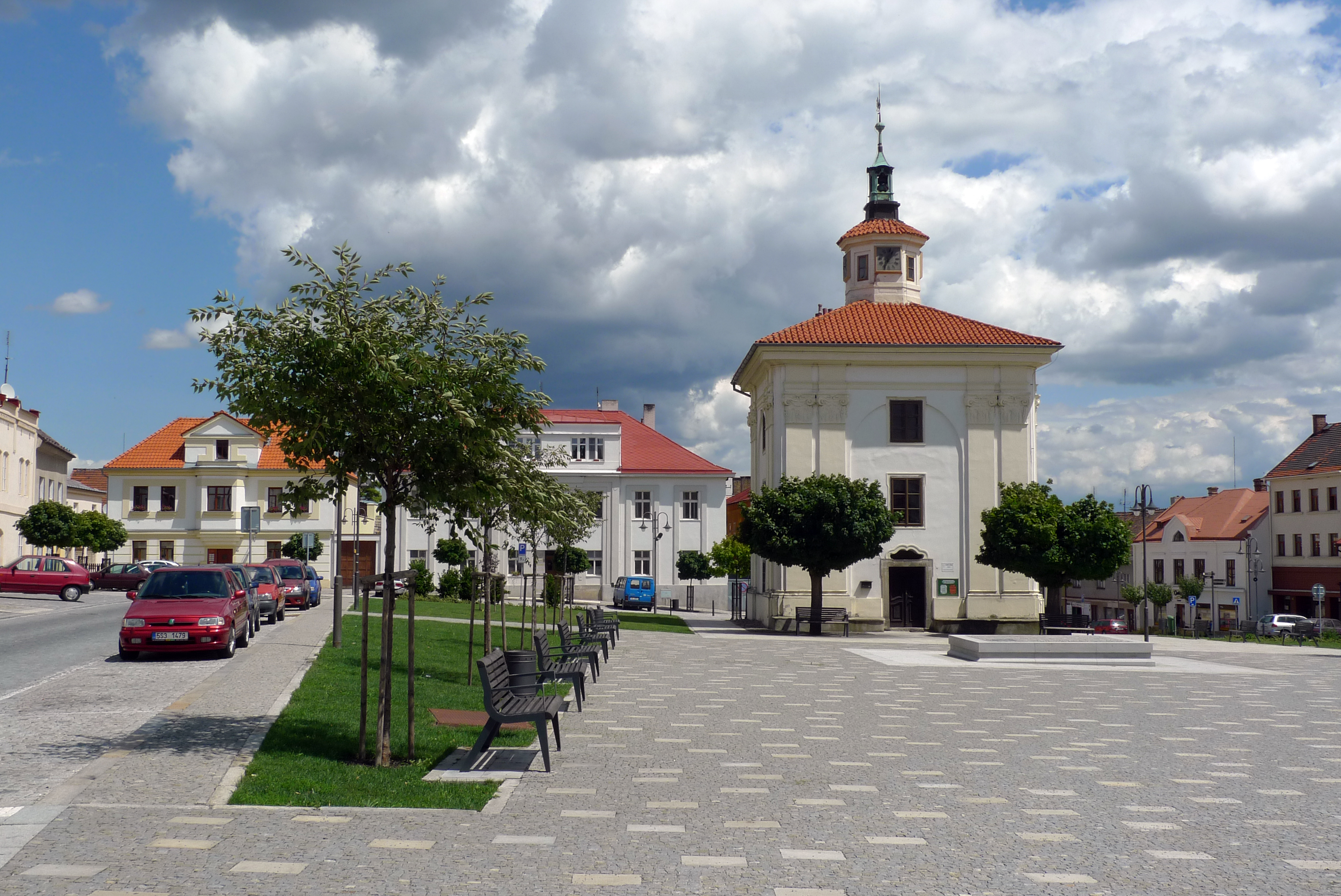
- The square Husovo náměstí

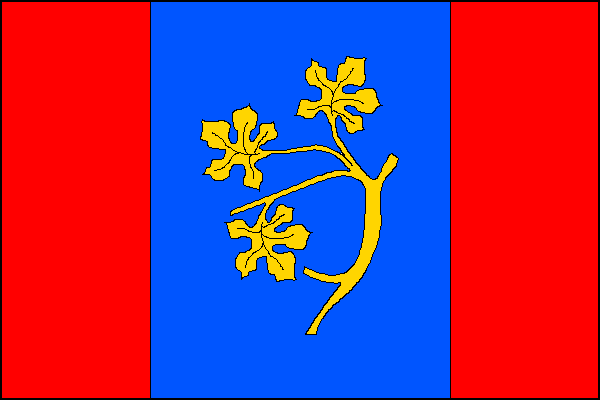
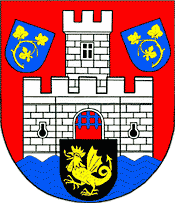
- Flag Coat of arms

- Location in the Czech Republic
- Coordinates: 50°17′22″N 14°49′52″E
- Country: Czech Republic
- Region: Central Bohemian
- District: Mladá Boleslav
- First mentioned: 1052

Government
  - Mayor: Karel Bendl (ODS)

Area
  - Total: 35.51 km^{2} (13.71 sq mi)
- Elevation: 225 m (738 ft)

Population (2026-01-01)
  - Total: 7,963
  - Density: 224.2/km^{2} (580.8/sq mi)
- Time zone: UTC+1 (CET)
  - Summer (DST): UTC+2 (CEST)
- Postal codes: 294 71, 294 72
- Website: www.benatky.cz

Benátky nad Jizerou (Czech pronunciation: [ˈbɛnaːtkɪ ˈnad jɪzɛrou]; German: Benatek) is a town in Mladá Boleslav District in the Central Bohemian Region of the Czech Republic. It has about 8,000 inhabitants. The town is located on the Jizera River in the Jizera Table.

The historic town centre is well preserved and is protected as an urban monument zone. The town is known for the Benátky nad Jizerou Castle.

== Administrative division ==
Benátky nad Jizerou consists of five municipal parts (in brackets population according to the 2021 census):

- Benátky nad Jizerou I (2,238)
- Benátky nad Jizerou II (3,875)
- Benátky nad Jizerou III (290)
- Dražice (497)
- Kbel (545)

== Etymology ==
Benátky is the Czech exonym for Venice. Several settlements in Bohemia founded near rivers and on wet marshy places were named this way, because their location reminded people of this Italian city.

== Geography ==
Benátky nad Jizerou is located about 15 kilometres (9 mi) south of Mladá Boleslav and 30 km (19 mi) northeast of Prague. It lies in the Jizera Table. The highest point is the hill Benátecký vrch at 251 m (823 ft) above sea level. The Jizera River flows through the town.

== History ==
The first written mention of the village of Obodř (today part of Benátky nad Jizerou III) is from 1052. In 1264, the Dražice Castle was founded. In 1346, Lord Jan of Dražice obtained permission to establish a town on a nearby hill. The town was named Nové Benátky (lit. 'new Venice'). In 1349, the monastery and the Church of the Nativity of the Virgin Mary were built.

== Demographics ==
Historical population

Year	Pop.	±%
1869	3,734	—
1880	4,625	+23.9%
1890	4,453	−3.7%
1900	4,706	+5.7%
1910	5,072	+7.8%

Year	Pop.	±%
1921	5,236	+3.2%
1930	5,301	+1.2%
1950	5,278	−0.4%
1961	5,840	+10.6%
1970	5,931	+1.6%

Year	Pop.	±%
1980	7,104	+19.8%
1991	6,614	−6.9%
2001	6,648	+0.5%
2011	7,357	+10.7%
2021	7,445	+1.2%

Source: Censuses

== Economy ==
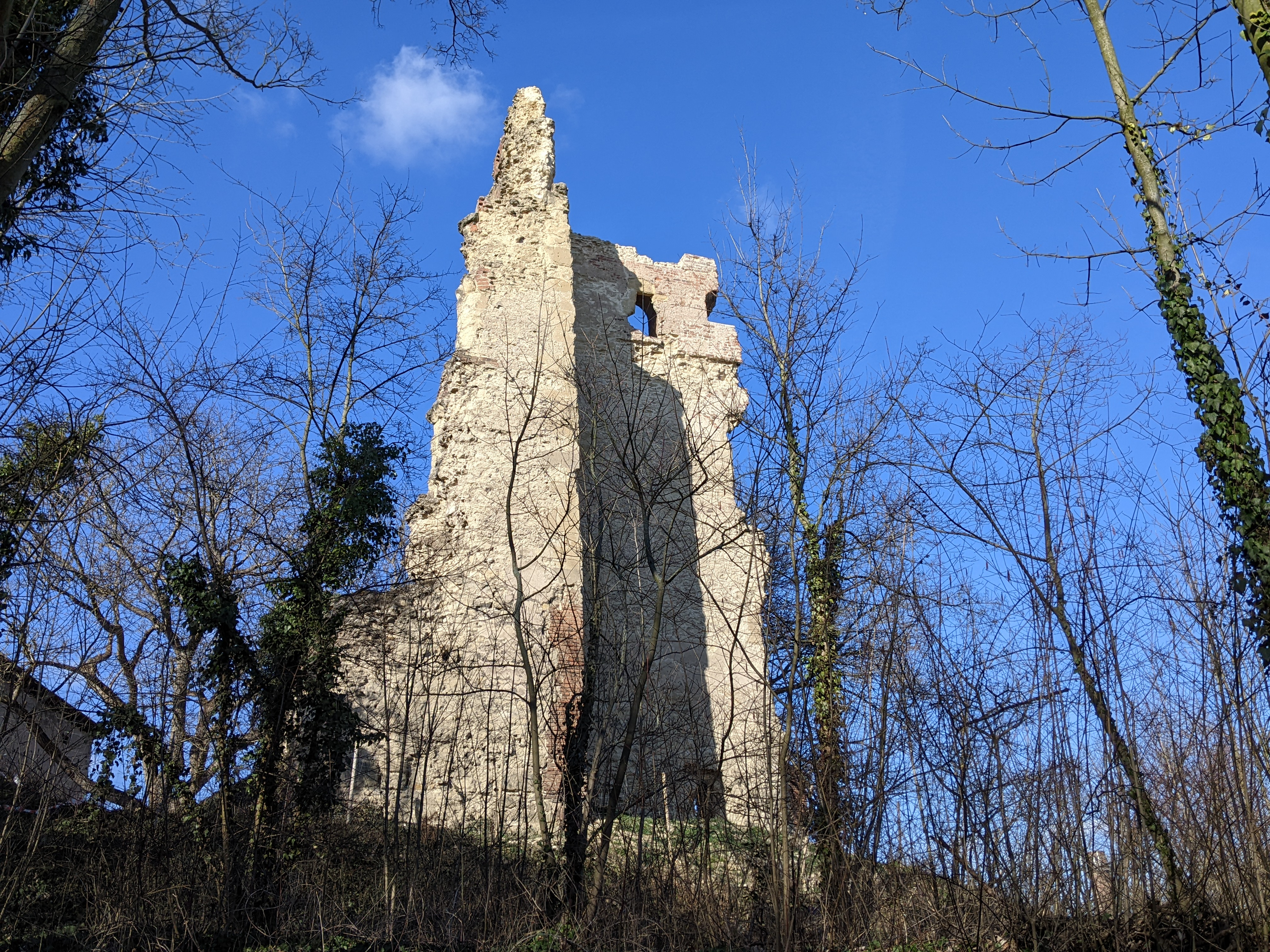
Ruin of the Dražice Castle

The village of Dražice is known for the manufacturer of water heaters DZ Dražice. It is the biggest company of its focus in the country, known throughout Europe. The company was founded in 1900, originally as grain warehouse, craft roller mill and bakery, later also a hydroelectric power plant. The water heaters are produced since 1956.

== Transport ==
The D10 motorway from Prague to Turnov runs through the municipal territory.

== Sights ==
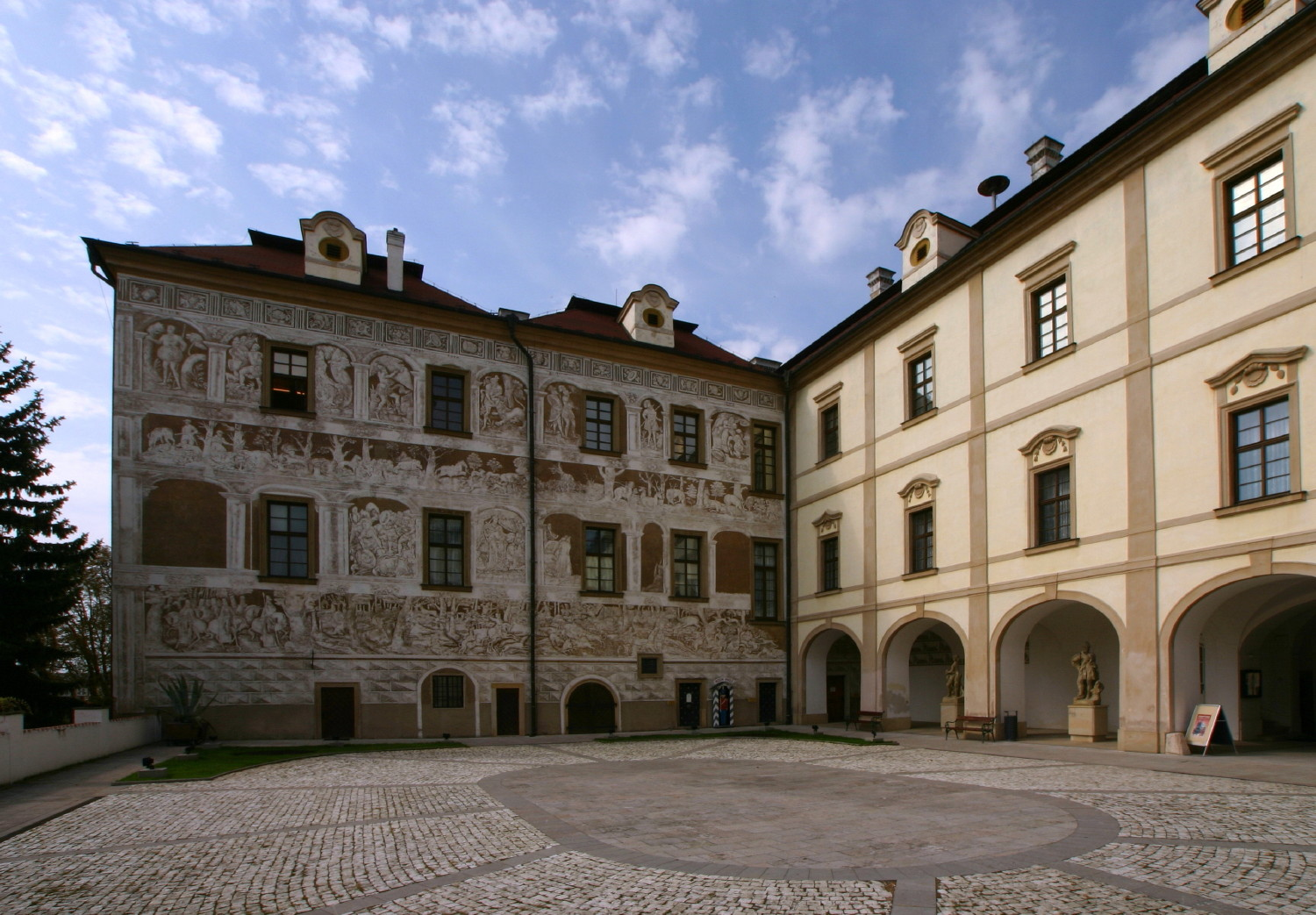
Benátky nad Jizerou Castle

The most important monument is the Benátky nad Jizerou Castle. It was built in the Renaissance style in 1526 and rebuilt in the Baroque style in the 17th century. The castle is surrounded by a park. A part of the castle complex is the Church of the Nativity of the Virgin Mary. The castle is known as the place where the astronomer Tycho Brahe had his observatory and where the composer Bedřich Smetana worked for a while. Today it houses the regional museum.

The main landmark of the town square is the Chapel of the Holy Family. It was built in the late Baroque style in 1737.

== Notable people ==
- Johann von Werth (1591–1652), German general; lived and died here
- Franz Benda (1709–1786), violinist and composer
- Johann Georg Benda (1713–1752), violinist and composer
- Georg Benda (1722–1795), violinist and composer
- Joseph Benda (1724–1804), violinist and composer
- Johann von Klenau (1758–1819), field marshal
- Zdeněk Kalista (1900–1982), historian and poet

== Twin towns – sister cities ==
Benátky nad Jizerou is twinned with:

- Hustopeče, Czech Republic
- Modra, Slovakia
- Reinsdorf, Germany
- Roßdorf, Germany
