= Johann Georg Benda =

Czech violinist and composer

Johann Georg Benda (Czech: Jan Jiří Benda; 30 August 1714 – 4 December 1752) was a Czech violinist and composer. He was active in the Electorate of Saxony.

== Life ==
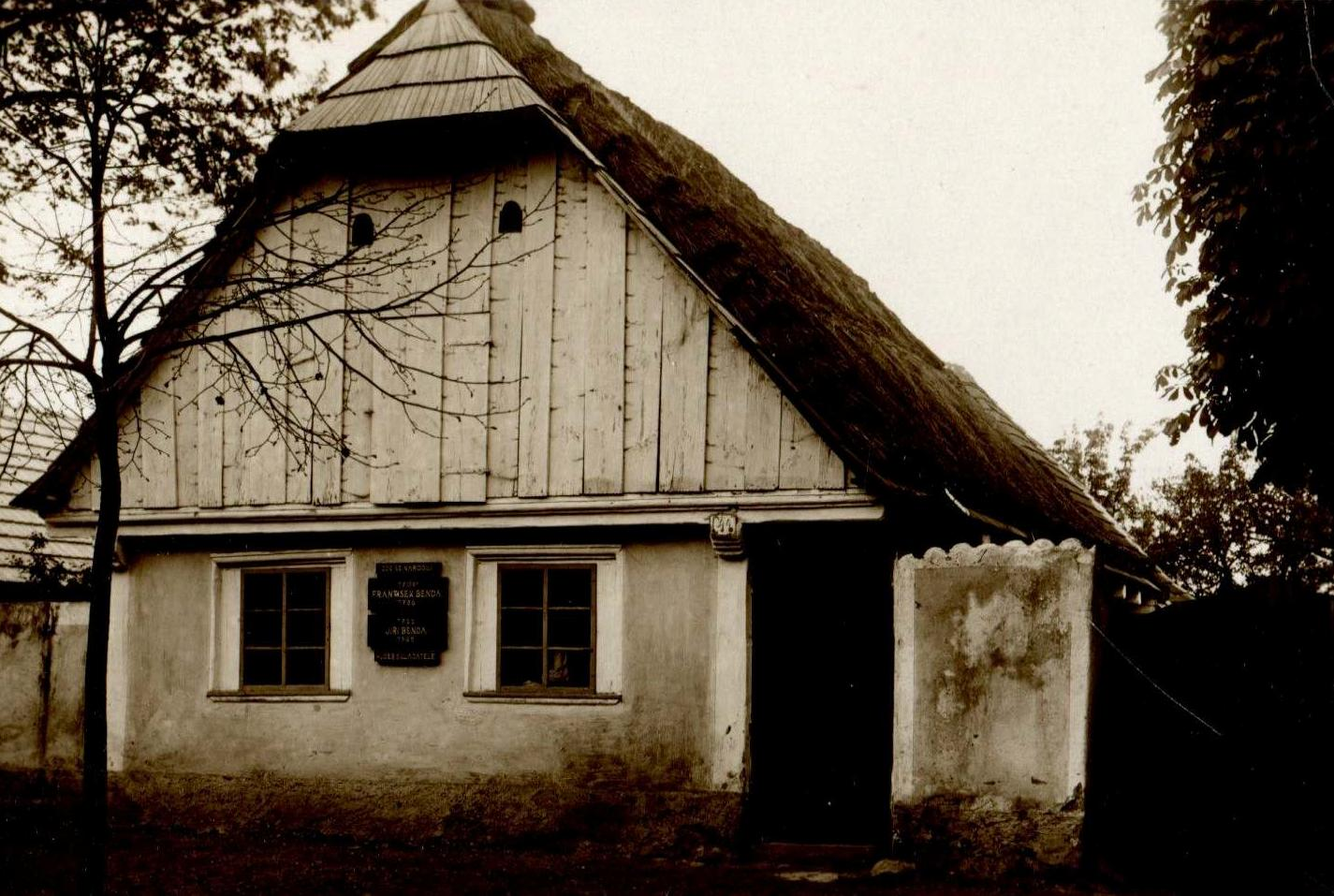
Benda family house in Benátky nad Jizerou, built 1706–1707, demolished 1936

Johann Georg Benda was born on 30 August 1714 in Benátky nad Jizerou, the son of a weaver, Jan Jiří Benda and his wife Dorota Brixi, daughter of the village cantor from Skalsko and member of the large Czech musical family. He was the second oldest of five brothers, four of whom achieved success as violinists and composers, Franz Benda, Georg Benda and Joseph Benda. His younger sister Anna Franziska Benda became an operatic soprano.

In 1733, Johann Georg followed his older brother Franz into the employment of the Hofkapelle at Dresden. Once again following in his brother's footsteps, Johann Georg moved to Rheinsberg in 1734 and, arriving on or after 8 April, was immediately employed as a viola player in the then-crown prince Frederick's private Hofkapelle. During this time, he also finalised his training as a violinist under the tutelage of his older brother, Franz. Upon the accession of Frederick to the Prussian throne in 1740, Johann Georg was transferred to Berlin where he was employed in the newly formed court orchestra, first as a viola player on a salary of 150 Thaler, and later as a violinist on a salary of 300 Thaler. He died in Berlin on 4 December 1752.

== Works ==
- Concerto in F major for violin, strings and continuo, LorB 279
- Concerto in F major for violin, strings and continuo, LorB 277
- Concerto in D minor for violin, strings and continuo (lost)
- Trio Sonata in C major for flute, violin and continuo, LorB 275
- Sonata for violin and continuo in C minor
- 11 Sonatas for flute and continuo, LorB 253-262, 264
- 7 Duets for 2 violins, LorB 265-270, 272
