= Zdeněk Kalista =

Czech poet, historian, literary critic and editor

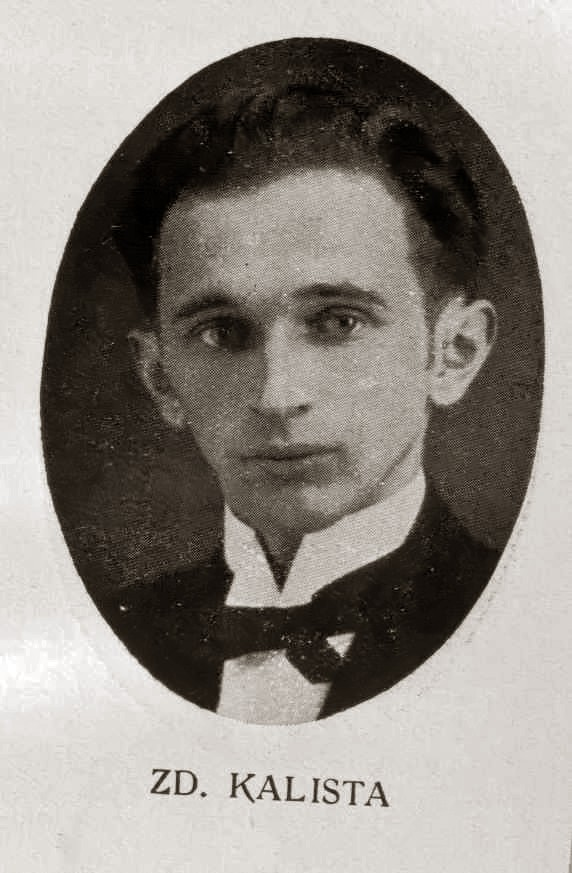
Zdeněk Kalista in 1930

Zdeněk Kalista (22 July 1900 – 17 June 1982) was a Czech historian, poet, literary critic, editor and translator. He also published his early works under the name Z. V. Kalista.

== Biography ==
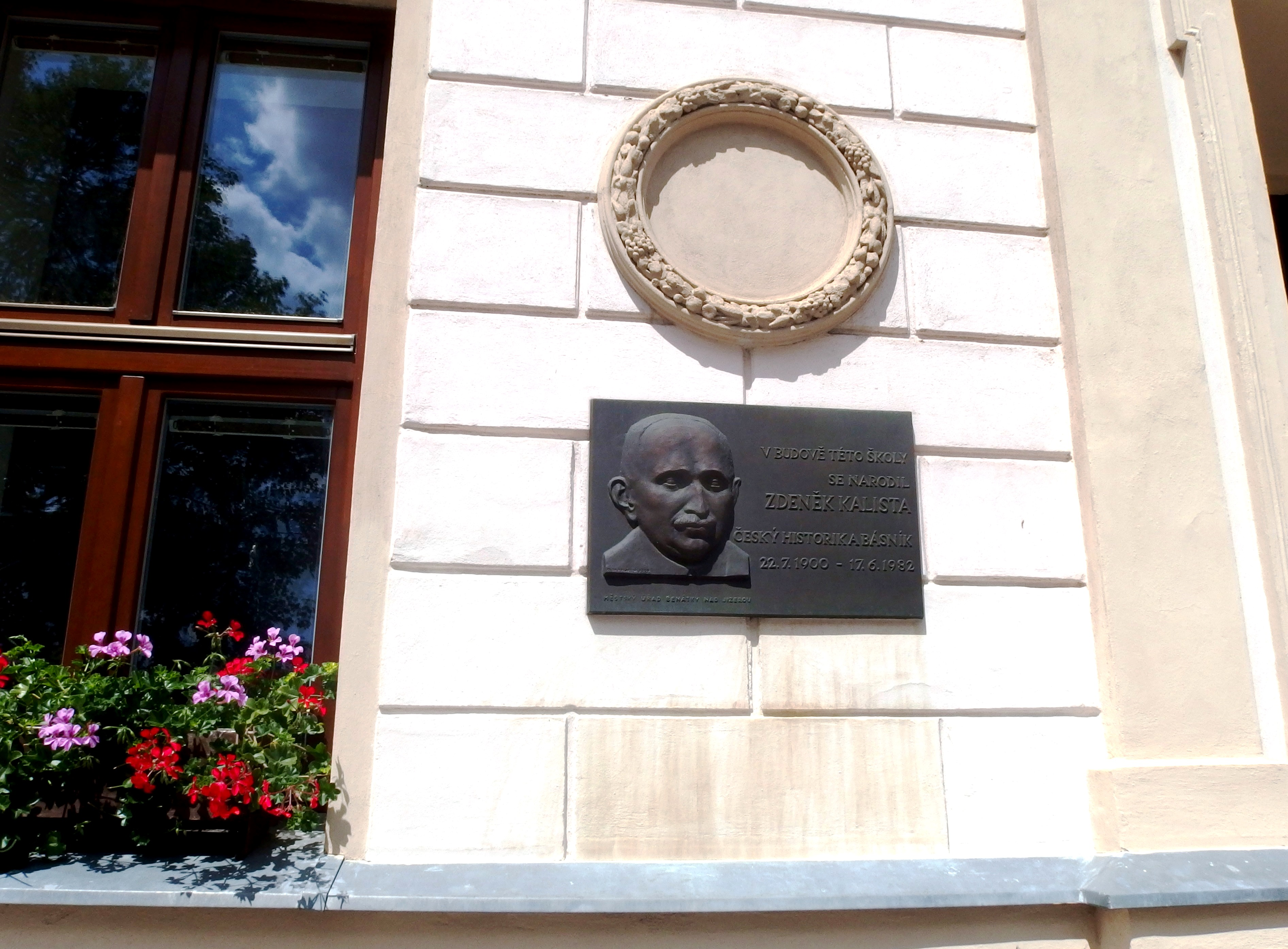
Memorial plaque in Benátky nad Jizerou

Kalista was born on 22 July 1900 in Benátky nad Jizerou. From 1921 to 1923, Zdeněk Kalista, a student of Josef Pekař, was elected deputy chairman of the Literární skupina ('Literary Group'). In 1928, he became a member of the Circle of Czech Writers (Kruh českých spisovatelů). Between 1924 and 1939, as well as from 1945 to 1948, he worked at Charles University in Prague, initially as an assistant at the Historical Seminar, and from 1932 as a lecturer. Following the Communist takeover, he fell victim to purges and was sentenced to 15 years in prison. He was released in 1960 and retired. In 1966, while working as an editor for various publishers and translating books, Zdeněk Kalista was rehabilitated.

Kalista published in a variety of Czech and foreign literary and historical journals. He contributed to Masaryk's Dictionary and his historical works sparked renewed interest in Czech Baroque.

Kalista died on 17 June 1982 in Prague, at the age of 81.

== Works ==
=== Books ===
- Cesty historikova myšlení (1947)
- Blahoslavená Zdislava z Lemberka (1969)
- Čechové, kteří tvořili dějiny světa (1939)
- Korespondence Zuzany Černínové (1941)
- Cesty ve znamení kříže (1947)
- Století andělů a ďáblů (1994)
- Stručné dějiny československé (1992)
- Vzpomínání na Jana Zahradníčka (1988)
- Setkání se snem aneb Finlandia
- Přátelství a osud (1978)
- Po proudu života (1961)
- Josef Pekař (1941)
- Ctihodná Marie Elekta Ježíšova (1975)
- Tváře ve stínu (1969)
- Po proudu života
- Veliká noc (1987)
