= Tuřice =

- Municipality
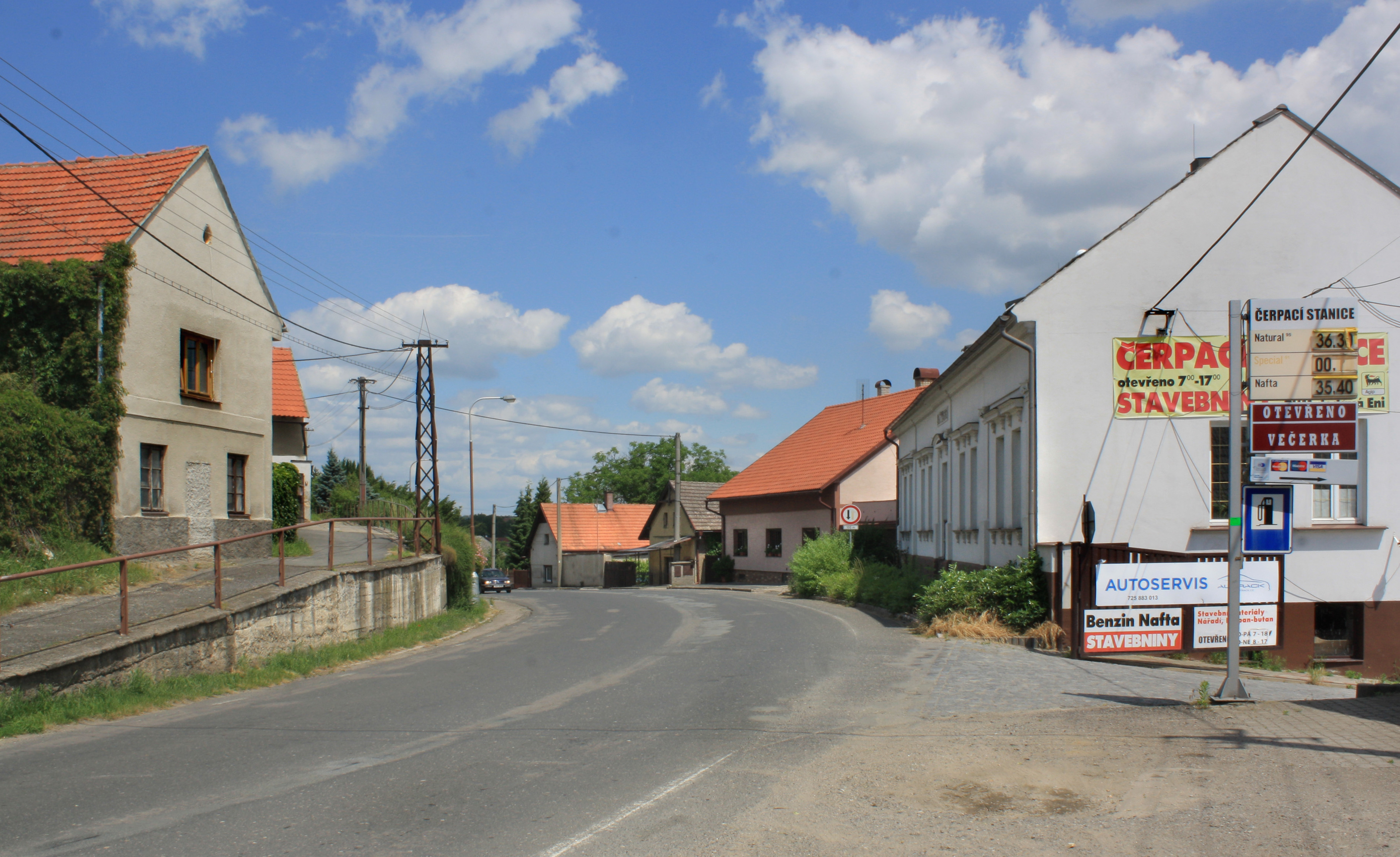
- Main street

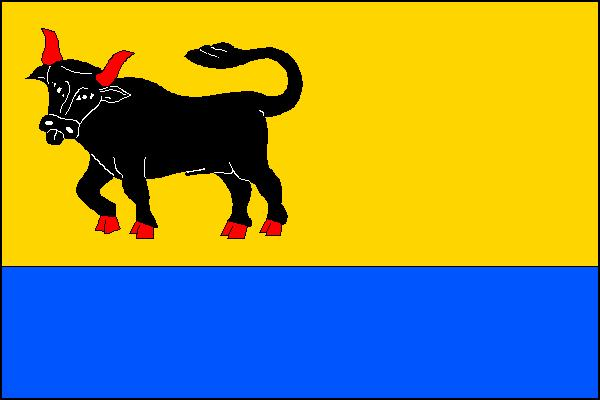
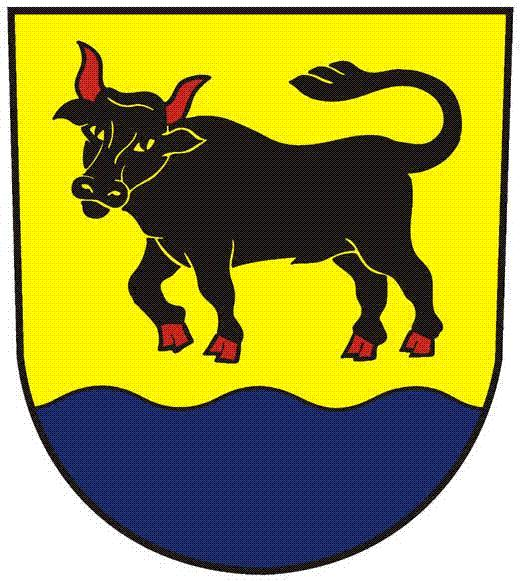
- Flag Coat of arms

- Location in the Czech Republic
- Coordinates: 50°14′56″N 14°46′9″E
- Country: Czech Republic
- Region: Central Bohemian
- District: Mladá Boleslav
- First mentioned: 1194

Area
  - Total: 4.83 km^{2} (1.86 sq mi)
- Elevation: 190 m (620 ft)

Population (2026-01-01)
  - Total: 516
  - Density: 107/km^{2} (277/sq mi)
- Time zone: UTC+1 (CET)
  - Summer (DST): UTC+2 (CEST)
- Postal code: 294 74
- Website: www.obec-turice.cz

Tuřice is a municipality and village in Mladá Boleslav District in the Central Bohemian Region of the Czech Republic. It has about 500 inhabitants.

== Administrative division ==
Tuřice consists of two municipal parts (in brackets population according to the 2021 census):

- Tuřice (376)
- Sobětuchy (76)

== Etymology ==
The name is derived from the Czech adjective tuří (from tur, meaning Bos).

== Geography ==
Tuřice is located about 22 kilometres (14 mi) northeast of Prague. It lies in a flat landscape in the Jizera Table. The municipality is situated on the right bank of the Jizera River, which forms the eastern municipal border.

== History ==
The first written mention of Tuřice is from 1194. Sobětuchy was first mentioned in 1488. From the 14th century until establishment of a sovereign municipality in 1850, the area was part of the Brandýs estate and shared its owners and destiny.

== Demographics ==
Historical population

Year	Pop.	±%
1869	417	—
1880	398	−4.6%
1890	389	−2.3%
1900	357	−8.2%
1910	365	+2.2%

Year	Pop.	±%
1921	378	+3.6%
1930	357	−5.6%
1950	299	−16.2%
1961	311	+4.0%
1970	280	−10.0%

Year	Pop.	±%
1980	236	−15.7%
1991	220	−6.8%
2001	242	+10.0%
2011	288	+19.0%
2021	452	+56.9%

Source: Censuses

== Transport ==
The D10 motorway from Prague to Turnov runs through the municipality.

== Sights ==
There are no protected cultural monuments in the municipality.
