= Skorkov (Mladá Boleslav District) =

Municipality and village in the Czech Republic

- Municipality
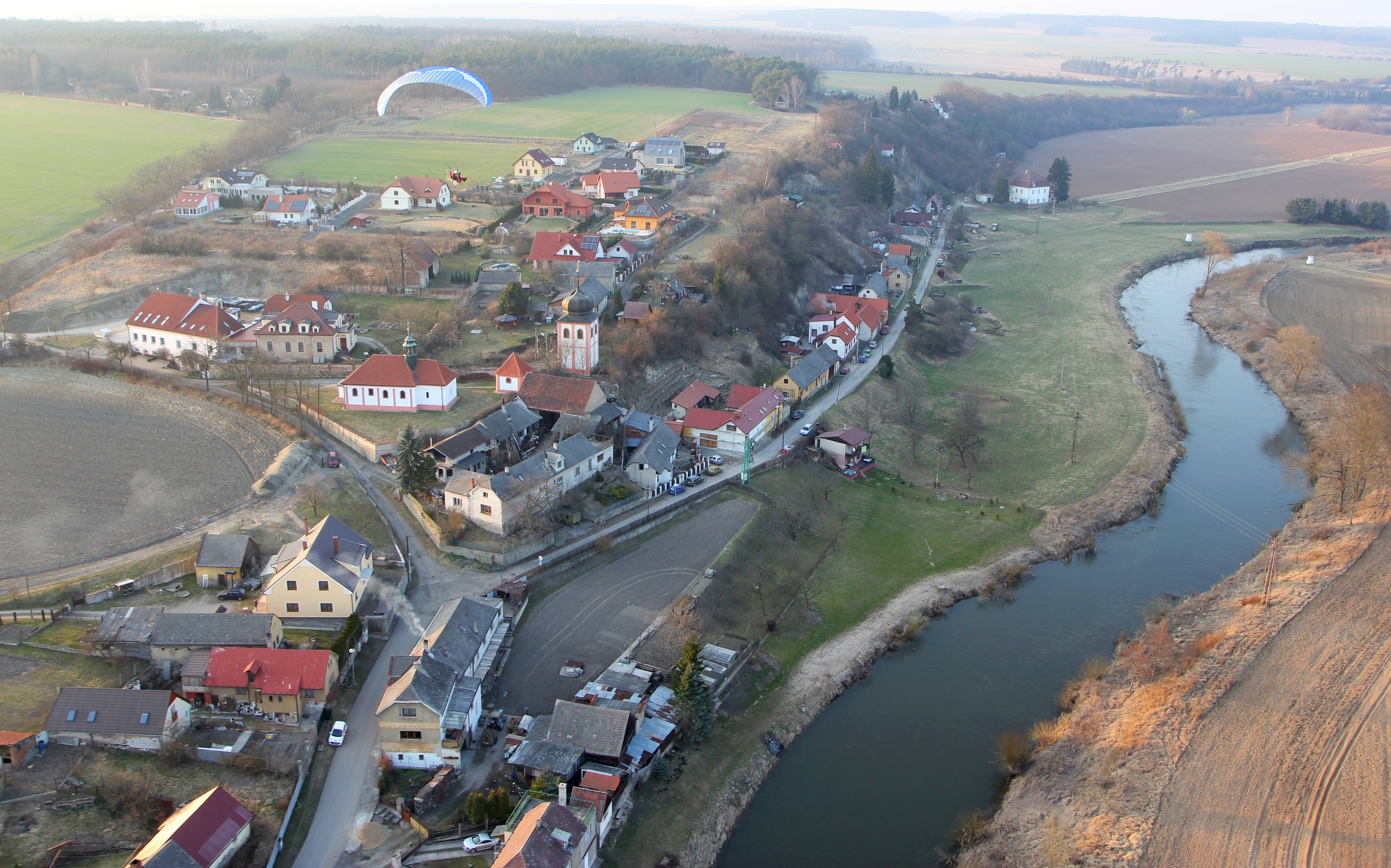
- Aerial view

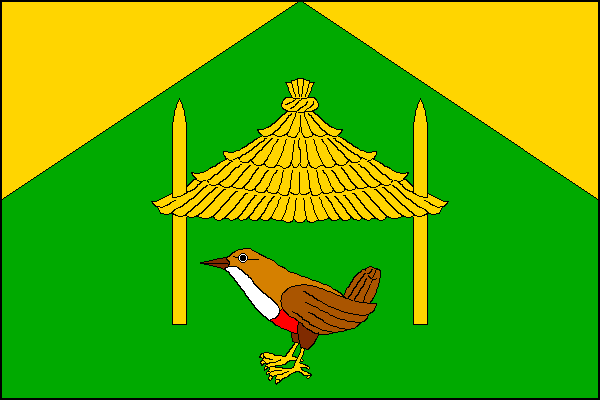
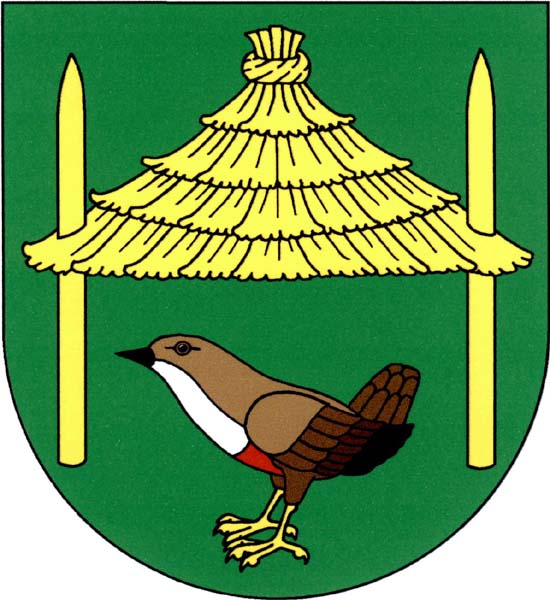
- Flag Coat of arms

- Location in the Czech Republic
- Coordinates: 50°13′54″N 14°44′58″E
- Country: Czech Republic
- Region: Central Bohemian
- District: Mladá Boleslav
- First mentioned: 1332

Area
  - Total: 16.64 km^{2} (6.42 sq mi)
- Elevation: 189 m (620 ft)

Population (2026-01-01)
  - Total: 744
  - Density: 44.7/km^{2} (116/sq mi)
- Time zone: UTC+1 (CET)
  - Summer (DST): UTC+2 (CEST)
- Postal code: 294 74
- Website: www.skorkov.cz

Skorkov is a municipality and village in Mladá Boleslav District in the Central Bohemian Region of the Czech Republic. It has about 700 inhabitants.

== Administrative division ==
Skorkov consists of three municipal parts (in brackets population according to the 2021 census):

- Skorkov (354)
- Otradovice (216)
- Podbrahy (157)

== Etymology ==
The name is derived from the personal name Skorek, meaning "Skorek's (court)".

== Geography ==
Skorkov is located about 23 kilometres (14 mi) southwest of Mladá Boleslav and 20 km (12 mi) northeast of Prague. It lies in a flat landscape, mostly belonging into the Central Elbe Table. The municipality is situated on the right bank of the Jizera River, which flows along the eastern municipal border.

== History ==
The first written mention of Skorkov is from 1332. Otradovice and Podbrahy were first mentioned in 1788.

== Demographics ==
Historical population

Year	Pop.	±%
1869	462	—
1880	501	+8.4%
1890	464	−7.4%
1900	433	−6.7%
1910	441	+1.8%

Year	Pop.	±%
1921	443	+0.5%
1930	435	−1.8%
1950	510	+17.2%
1961	500	−2.0%
1970	472	−5.6%

Year	Pop.	±%
1980	419	−11.2%
1991	331	−21.0%
2001	357	+7.9%
2011	529	+48.2%
2021	727	+37.4%

Source: Censuses

== Transport ==
The D10 motorway from Prague to Turnov runs along the northern municipal border.

== Sights ==
The main landmark and the oldest building of Skorkov is the Church of Saint John the Baptist. It was first documented in 1359. After it was damaged during the Thirty Years' War, it was rebuilt in 1690. The bell tower was added in 1689 and rebuilt into its current form in 1873. Next to the church is a Renaissance ossuary.
