= Káraný =

- Municipality
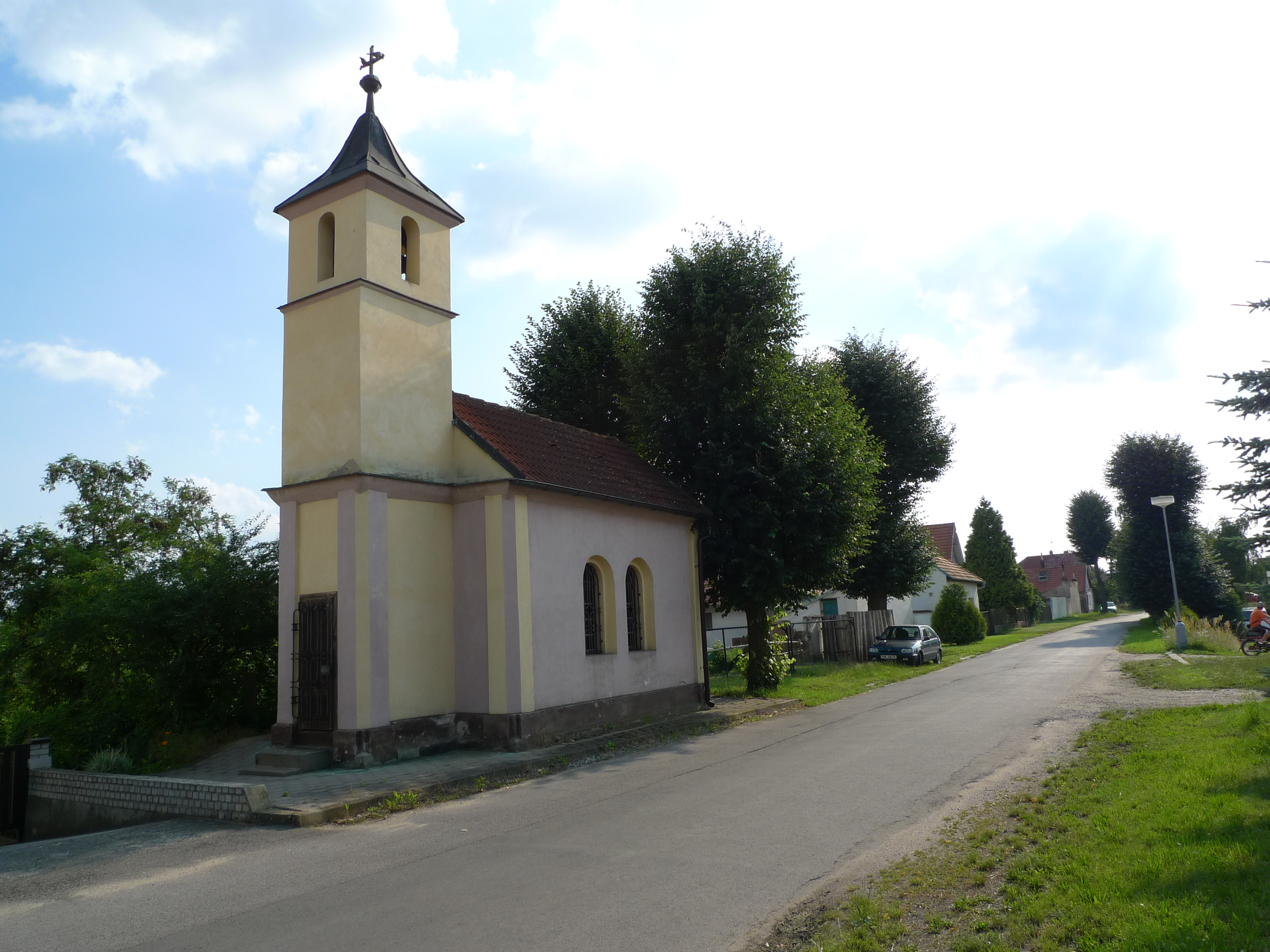
- Chapel of Saint John of Nepomuk

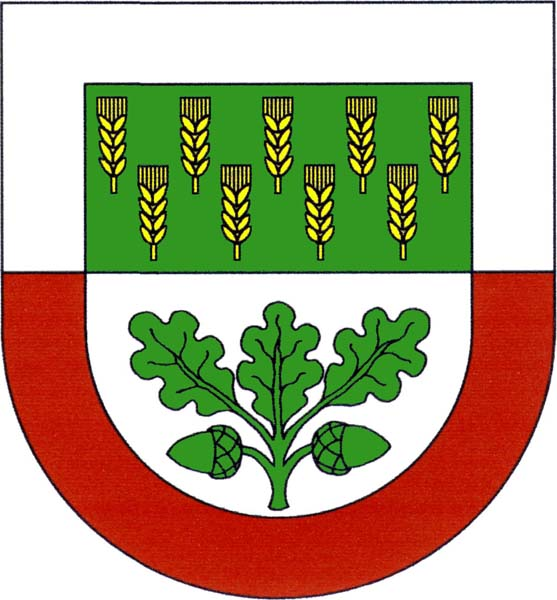
- Flag Coat of arms

- Location in the Czech Republic
- Coordinates: 50°10′29″N 14°44′13″E
- Country: Czech Republic
- Region: Central Bohemian
- District: Prague-East
- Founded: 1777

Area
  - Total: 8.94 km^{2} (3.45 sq mi)
- Elevation: 173 m (568 ft)

Population (2026-01-01)
  - Total: 884
  - Density: 98.9/km^{2} (256/sq mi)
- Time zone: UTC+1 (CET)
  - Summer (DST): UTC+2 (CEST)
- Postal code: 250 75
- Website: www.karany.cz

Káraný is a municipality and village in Prague-East District in the Central Bohemian Region of the Czech Republic. It has about 900 inhabitants.

== Etymology ==
Káraný was originally name of a forest in which game hunting and tree cutting were "severely punished" (in old Czech káráno). The name was then transferred to the settlement.

== Geography ==
Káraný is located about 11 kilometres (7 mi) northeast of Prague. It lies in the Central Elbe Table. The municipality is situated at the confluence of the Elbe and Jizera rivers.

== History ==
Káraný was founded in 1777.

== Demographics ==
Historical population

Year	Pop.	±%
1869	110	—
1880	98	−10.9%
1890	116	+18.4%
1900	116	+0.0%
1910	132	+13.8%

Year	Pop.	±%
1921	211	+59.8%
1930	276	+30.8%
1950	460	+66.7%
1961	541	+17.6%
1970	510	−5.7%

Year	Pop.	±%
1980	513	+0.6%
1991	450	−12.3%
2001	452	+0.4%
2011	674	+49.1%
2021	853	+26.6%

Source: Censuses

== Transport ==
The Prague–Kolín railway line runs through the municipal territory, but there is no train station. The municipality is served by the station in neighbouring Čelákovice.

== Economy ==
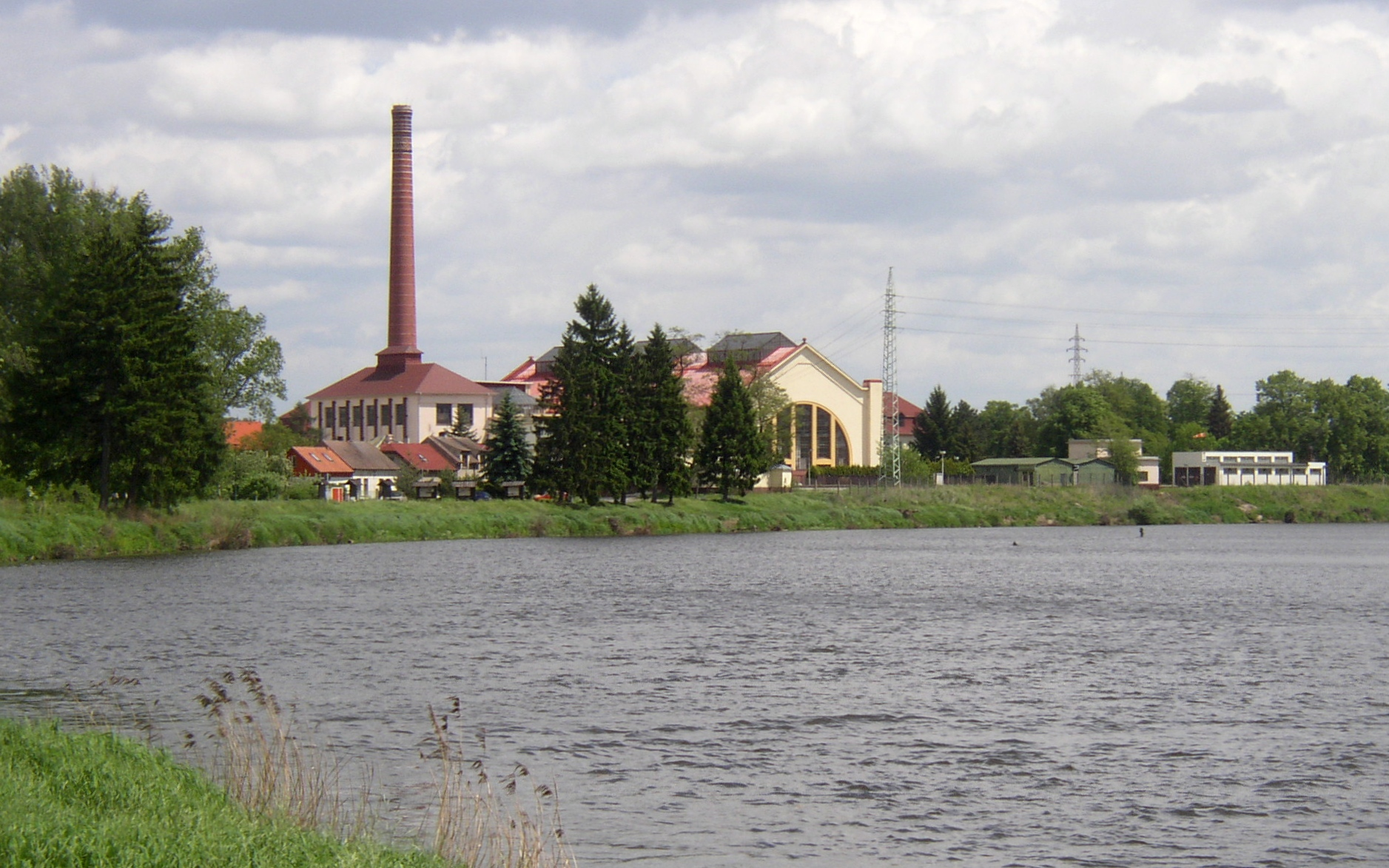
Water treatment facility

Thanks to its location, Káraný is known as a recreation area. A significant majority of the houses in the village are cottages of residents of Prague and other larger towns nearby.

Since 1914, Káraný has supplied Prague with drinking water. Its water treatment facility on right bank of the Elbe is one of three major sources of drinking water for Prague.

In 2010–2012, a small hydroelectric power plant was built.

== Sights ==
The most valuable building is the former inn. It is a pseudo-Baroque house with Art Nouveau elements from the beginning of the 20th century. Today it is in a desolate state and unused.

A landmark is the Chapel of Saint John of Nepomuk in the centre of the village.
