= Nový Vestec =

- Municipality
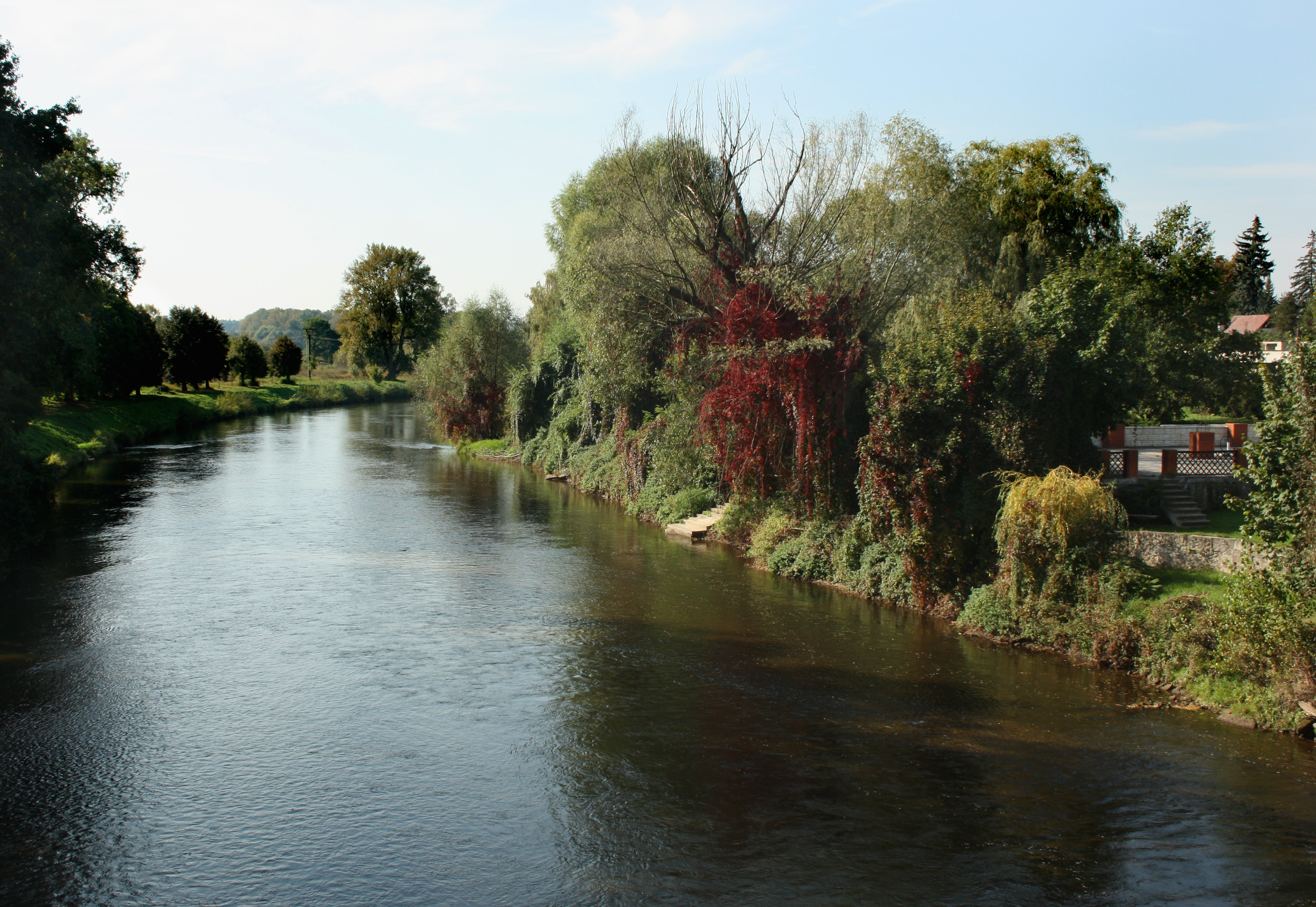
- Jizera River in Nový Vestec

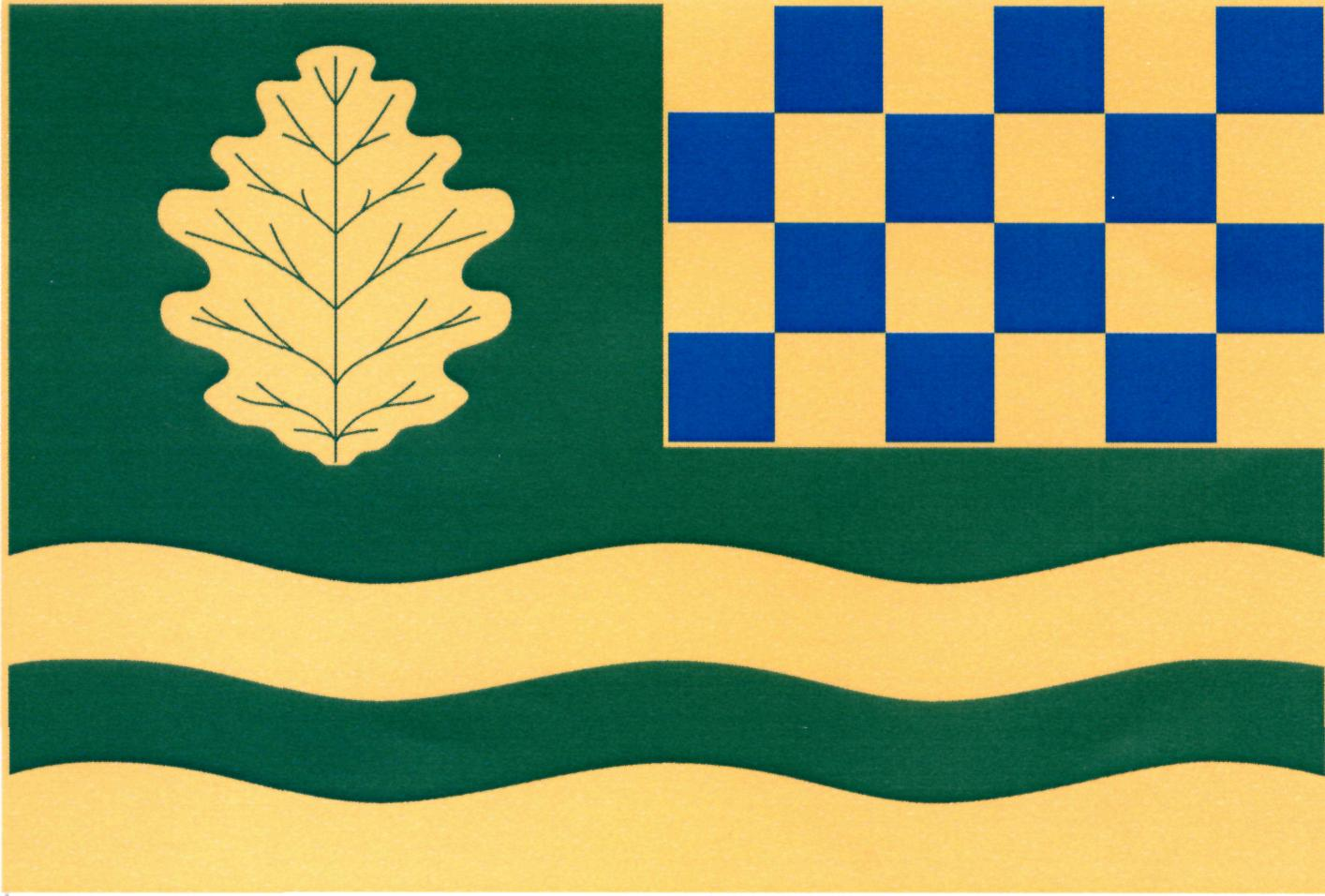
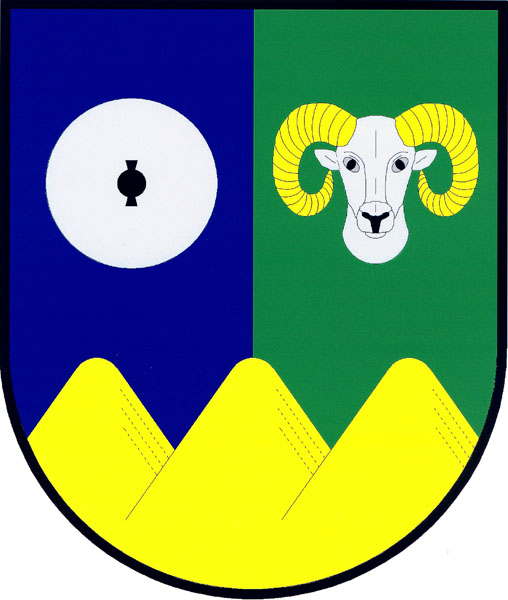
- Flag Coat of arms

- Location in the Czech Republic
- Coordinates: 50°11′2″N 14°43′13″E
- Country: Czech Republic
- Region: Central Bohemian
- District: Prague-East
- First mentioned: 1777

Area
  - Total: 3.14 km^{2} (1.21 sq mi)
- Elevation: 173 m (568 ft)

Population (2026-01-01)
  - Total: 515
  - Density: 164/km^{2} (425/sq mi)
- Time zone: UTC+1 (CET)
  - Summer (DST): UTC+2 (CEST)
- Postal code: 250 75
- Website: www.obecnovyvestec.cz

Nový Vestec is a municipality and village in Prague-East District in the Central Bohemian Region of the Czech Republic. It has about 500 inhabitants.

== Demographics ==
Historical population
Year	Pop.	±%
1869	94	—
1880	121	+28.7%
1890	146	+20.7%
1900	130	−11.0%
1910	117	−10.0%
1921	141	+20.5%
1930	135	−4.3%
1950	379	+180.7%
1961	345	−9.0%
1970	308	−10.7%
1980	268	−13.0%
1991	307	+14.6%
2001	278	−9.4%
2011	409	+47.1%
2021	546	+33.5%
Source: Censuses
