= Jizera (river) =

Jizera Izera
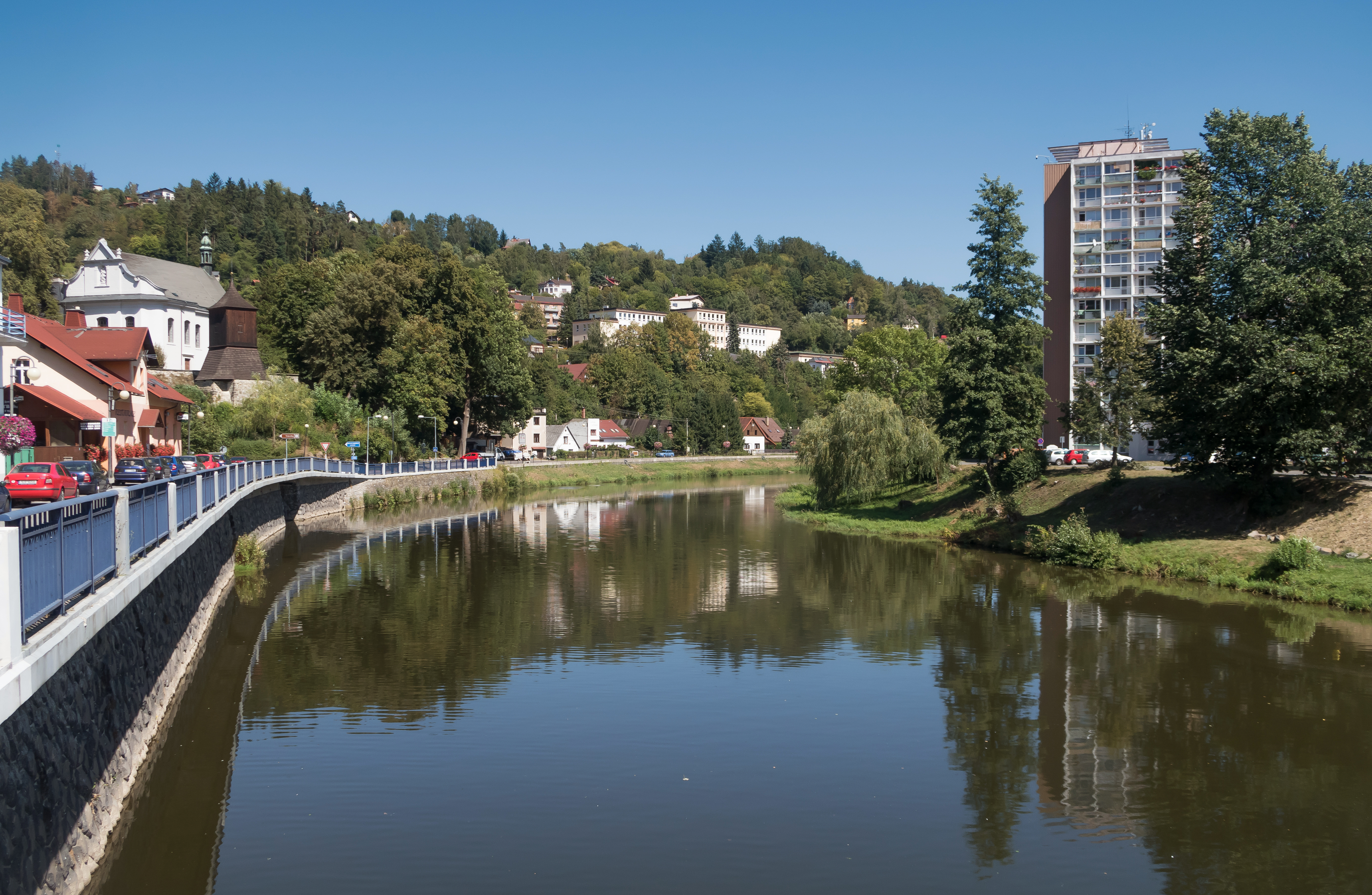
- The Jizera in Železný Brod

Location
- Countries: Czech Republic; Poland
- Regions/ Voivodeships: Liberec; Central Bohemian; Lower Silesian

Physical characteristics
- Source
  - location: Lázně Libverda/Mirsk, Jizera Mountains
  - coordinates: 50°53′5″N 15°17′7″E/ 50°53′10″N 15°18′2″E
  - elevation: 984/1,035 m (3,228/3,396 ft)
- Mouth
  - location: Elbe
  - coordinates: 50°10′21″N 14°42′56″E
  - elevation: 169 m (554 ft)
- Length: 167.0 km (103.8 mi)
- Basin size: 2,193.4 km^{2} (846.9 sq mi)
- Discharge
  - average: 24.3 m^{3}/s (860 cu ft/s)

Basin features
- Progression: Elbe→ North Sea

The Jizera (Czech pronunciation: [ˈjɪzɛra]; Polish: Izera, German: Iser) is a river in the Czech Republic and for a brief stretch in Poland. It is a right tributary of the Elbe and flows through the Liberec and Central Bohemian regions. It is 167.0 km (103.8 mi) long, making it the 10th longest river in the Czech Republic.

== Etymology ==
The first written mention of Jizera (as Gizera) is from the 13th century. The origin of the name is most likely Celtic and is derived from the verbal root -eis, -ois, -is, meaning 'to flow briskly'. It has the same etymology as the Isar in Germany, the Yser/IJzer in Belgium and France, the Isère in France and probably the River Aire in England.

== Characteristic ==
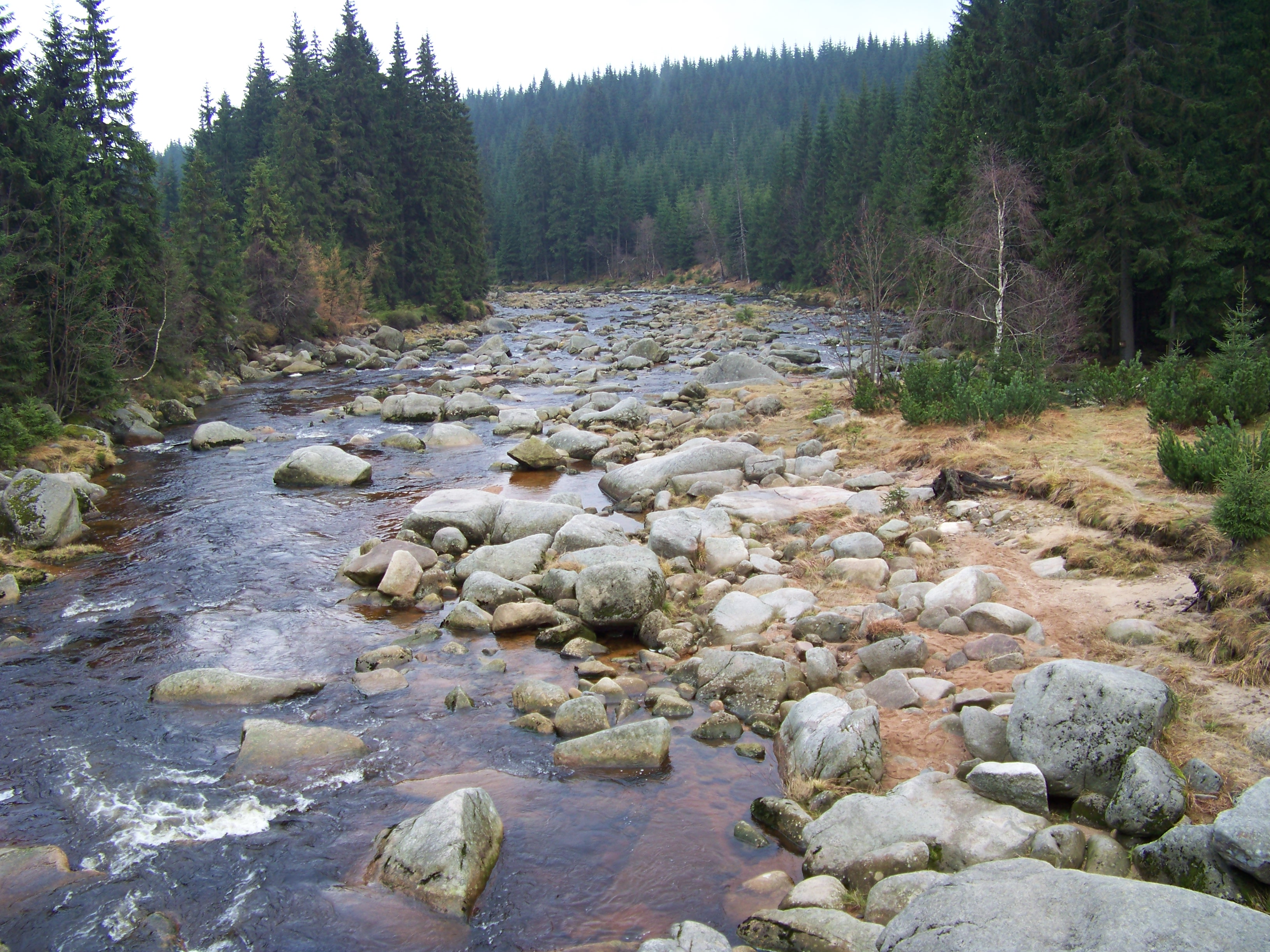
Upper course of the Jizera

The Jizera originates in the Jizera Mountains. Two sources of the river are defined. The first spring (so-called "Czech spring of the Jizera") is located on the slopes of the Smrk mountain in the territory of Lázně Libverda on the Czech side of the border at an elevation of 984 m (3,228 ft), and for centuries it was considered the only source of the Jizera. In the 1990s, the so-called "Polish spring of the Jizera" was determined (on the slopes of Stóg Izerski in the territory of Gmina Mirsk on the Polish side at an elevation of 1,035 m (3,396 ft)), as the source of a headwater that is longer and more substantial than the Czech one, but historically it was a separate stream with a different name.

The Jizera flows to Lázně Toušeň, where it enters the Elbe at an elevation of 169 m (554 ft). Considering the "Czech spring of the Jizera", it is 167.0 km (103.8 mi) long, making it the 10th longest river in the Czech Republic. Considering the "Polish spring of the Jizera", it is 167.5 km (104.1 mi) long, of which 1.4 km (0.9 mi) is in Poland. The Czech–Polish border is formed by 17 km (11 mi) of the river. Its drainage basin has an area of 2,193.4 km^{2} (846.9 sq mi), of which 2,145.2 km^{2} (828.3 sq mi) is in the Czech Republic.

The longest tributaries of the Jizera are:

Tributary	Length (km)	River km	Side
Mohelka	41.6	61.4	right
Kamenice	36.9	101.0	right
Oleška	36.0	106.3	left
Klenice	29.3	36.9	left
Žehrovka	26.3	66.9	left
Zábrdka	24.5	55.2	right
Jizerka	21.5	121.7	left
Libuňka	21.4	78.4	left
Strenický potok	20.3	30.6	right
Bělá	15.0	49.1	right

A notable tributary is also the Mumlava, which has an average discharge near estuary at 1.98 m^{3}/s (70 cu ft/s).

== Course ==
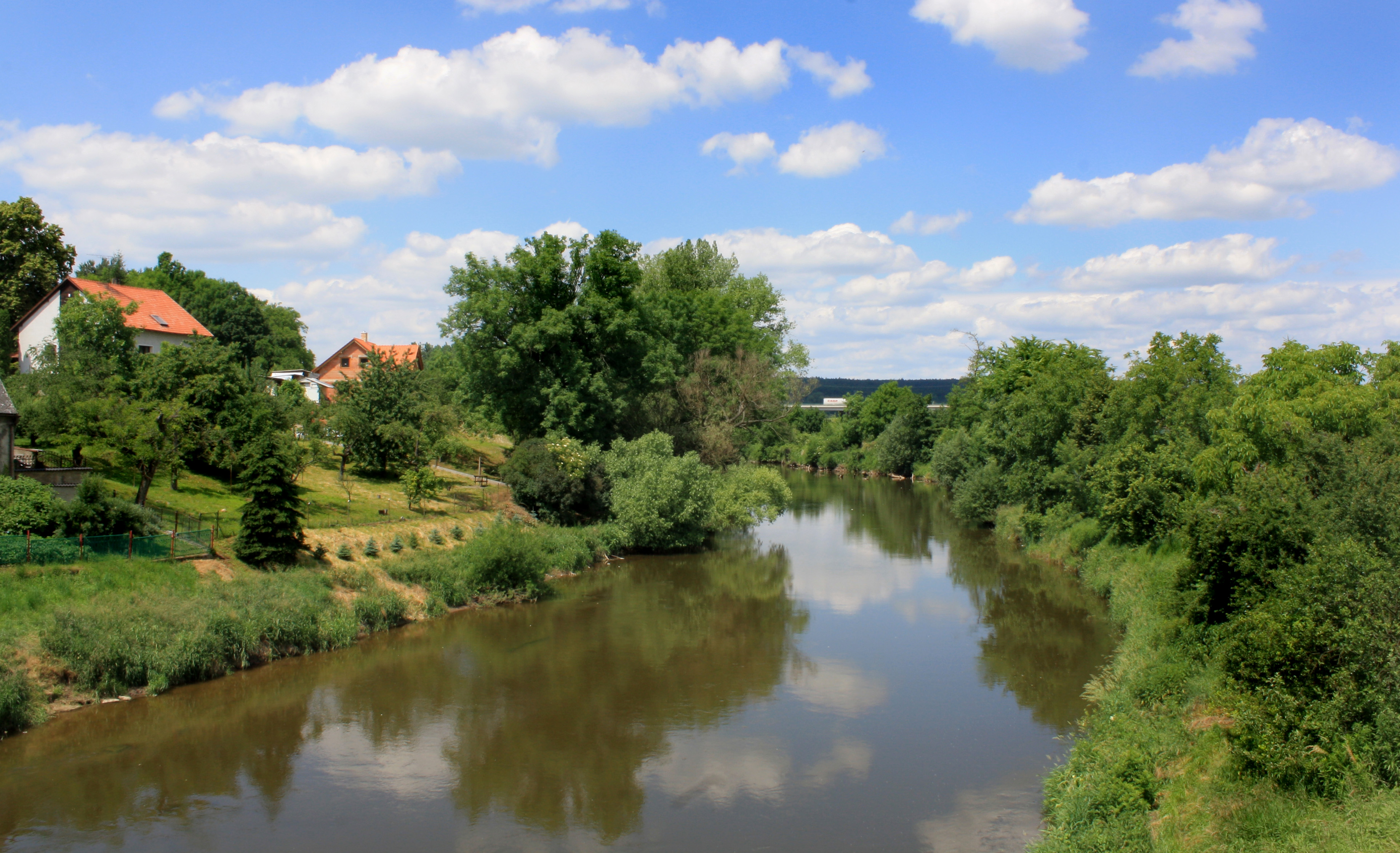
The Jizera in Tuřice

The largest settlement on the river is the city of Mladá Boleslav. The river flows past Kořenov, Rokytnice nad Jizerou, Jablonec nad Jizerou, Semily, Železný Brod, Malá Skála, Turnov, Mnichovo Hradiště, Bakov nad Jizerou, Mladá Boleslav, Benátky nad Jizerou, Předměřice nad Labem, Tuřice, Nový Vestec, Káraný and Lázně Toušeň.

== Bodies of water ==
There are no reservoirs and fishponds built directly on the Jizera. The largest body of water in the basin area is the Josefův Důl Reservoir with an area of 130 ha (320 acres), built on the Kamenice. There are 1,350 bodies of water in the basin area.

== Fauna ==
There are many species of molluscs in the river. Among the most endangered species are Cochlodina dubiosa corcontica, Daudebardia brevipes, Planorbis carinatus, Clausilia cruciata, Euconulus praticola, Pseudotrichia rubiginosa, Ruthenica filograna, Semilimax kotulae, Vertigo alpestris, Vertigo antivertigo and Vitrea subrimata.

The Jizera is one of the cleanest rivers in the country and there is a high density of fish, which is why it is popular for fishing. The upper and middle courses are mainly inhabited by brown trout and grayling.

== Economy ==
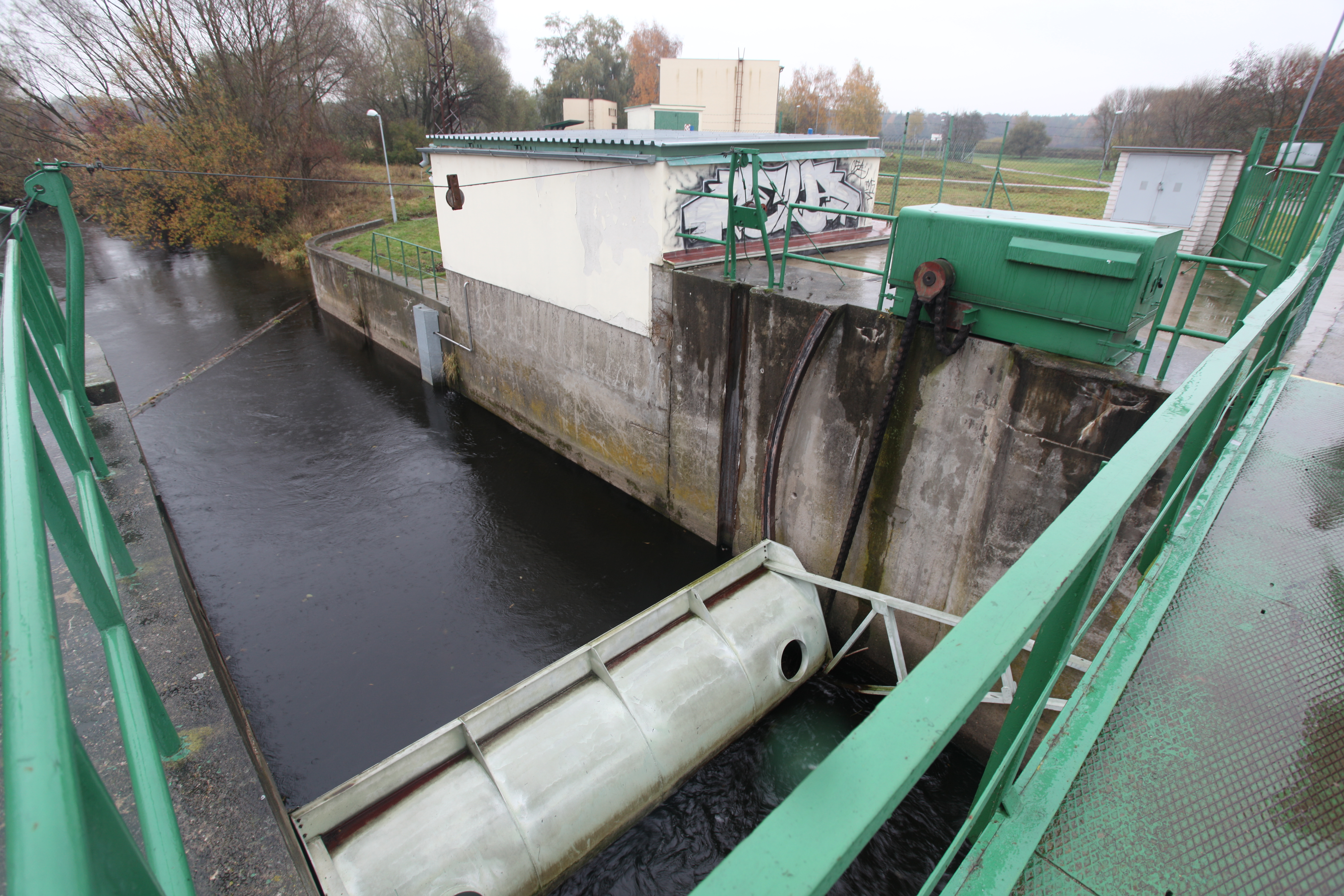
Pumping water site for artificial infiltration in Sojovice

Jizera is a resource of drinking water for the city of Prague and the central part of the Central Bohemian Region. It supplies Prague with drinking water from approximately one third of the total need, the rest of Prague's need is covered by water from the Švihov Reservoir. From Benátky nad Jizerou to its on-flow, the Jizera is surrounded by bank infiltration system, and in the municipality of Sojovice the water is being pumped for artificial infiltration.

== Tourism ==
The Jizera is suitable for river tourism. Due to its mountainous character, the upper course is popular among experienced paddlers, but within the entire river there are sections of all difficulties.
